= Toyota Carina =

Compact car produced by Toyota (1970–2001)

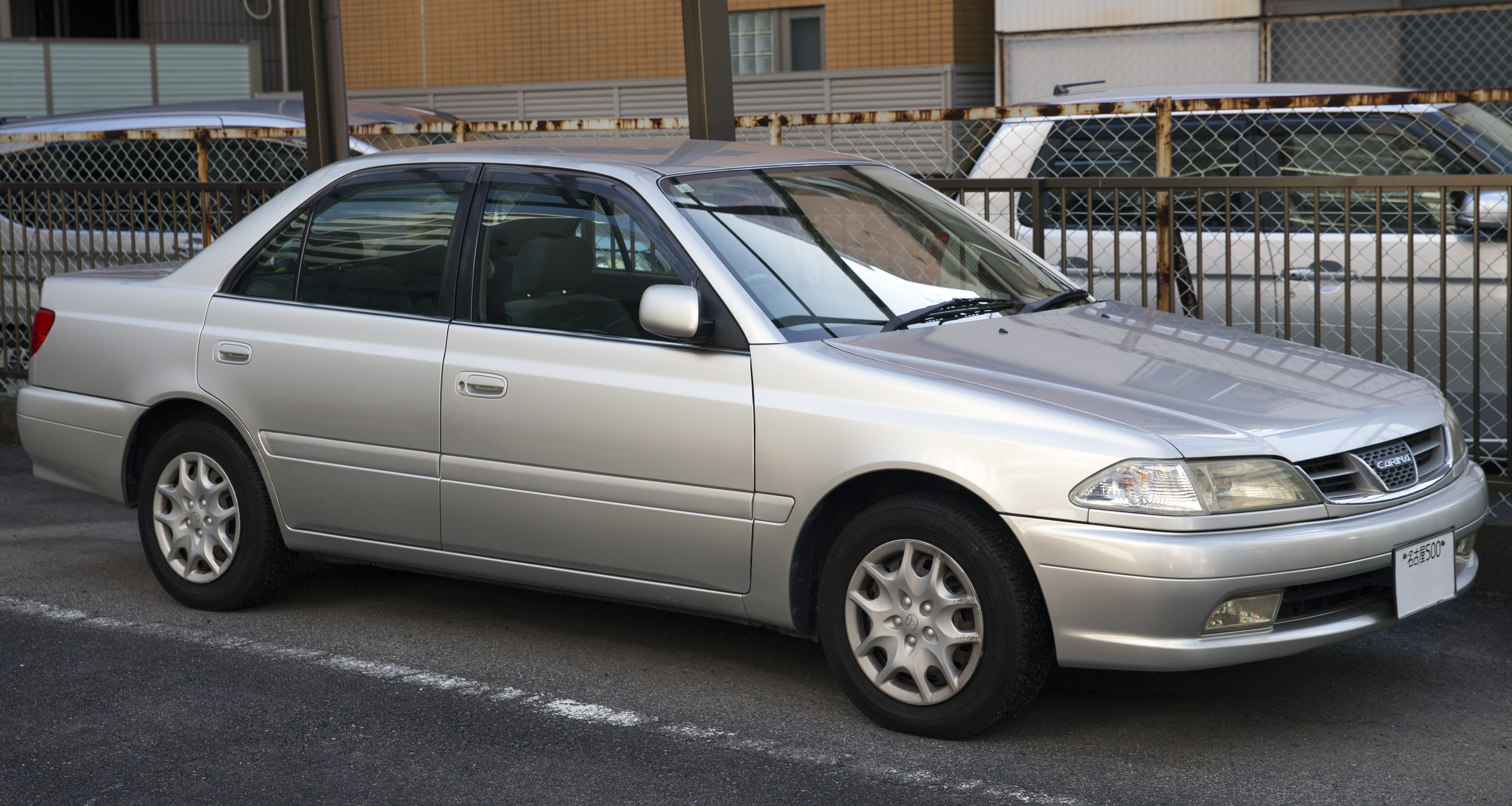
- Facelift Toyota Carina 1.8 Si (AT211, Japan)

Overview
- Manufacturer: Toyota
- Production: December 1970 – December 2001
- Assembly: Japan: Toyota City, Aichi (Tsutsumi plant)

Body and chassis
- Class: Compact car
- Related: Toyota Celica (1970–1984); Toyota Corona (1984–2001)

Chronology
- Successor: Toyota Allion (Japan); Toyota Avensis (Europe)

The Toyota Carina (Japanese: トヨタ・カリーナ, Hepburn: Toyota Karina) is an automobile which was manufactured by Toyota from December 1970 to December 2001. It was introduced as a sedan counterpart of the Celica, with which it originally shared a platform. Later, it was realigned to the Corona platform, but retained its performance image, with distinctive bodywork and interior — aimed at the youth market and remaining exclusive to Japanese Toyota dealerships Toyota Store. It was replaced in Japan by the Toyota Allion in 2001 and succeeded in Europe by the Toyota Avensis.

The inspiration for the name Carina came from the constellation Carina, sharing a naming inspiration with the Celica, which is ultimately derived from the Latin word coelica meaning "heavenly" or "celestial".

== First generation (A10/A30; 1970) ==
First generation
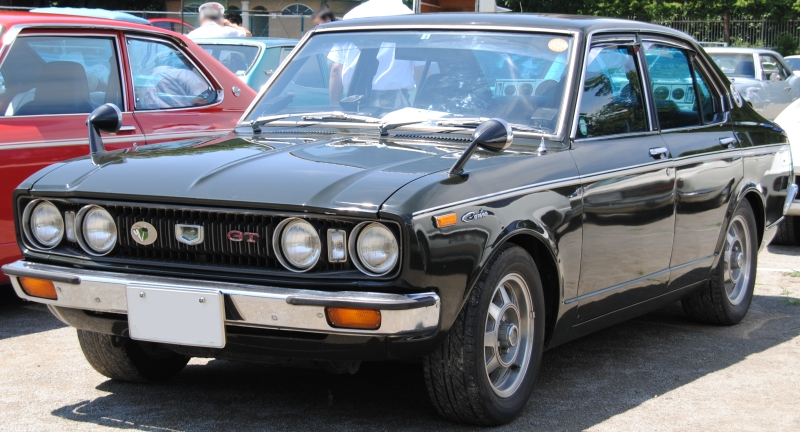
- Toyota Carina 1600GT 4-door sedan (TA12)

Overview
- Model code: A10/A30
- Production: 1970–1977

Body and chassis
- Body style: 2/4-door sedan; 2-door hardtop coupé; 5-door wagon/van
- Layout: Front-engine, rear-wheel drive
- Related: Toyota Celica

Powertrain
- Engine: 1407 cc T/T-J OHV I4 (TA10/15/16V); 1588 cc 2T/2T-B/BR/C/J/U OHV I4 (TA12/14/17/18/19V/30); 1588 cc 2T-G/GR DOHC I4 (TA12/17); 1588 cc 12T OHV I4 (TA31); 1770 cc 3T-U OHV I4 (TA32); 1808 cc 16R-U SOHC I4 (RA10/16); 1968 cc 18R/18R-E SOHC I4 (RA11/15/17/30); 1968 cc 18R-G/GR/GU DOHC I4 (RA15/17/30); 1968 cc 19R SOHC I4 (RA13/14/31)
- Transmission: 3-speed manual N30; 4-speed manual T40/W40; 5-speed manual T50/W50/P51; 2-speed automatic A20; 3-speed automatic A30

Dimensions
- Wheelbase: 2,425–2,495 mm (95.5–98.2 in)
- Length: 4,135–4,270 mm (162.8–168.1 in)
- Width: 1,570–1,630 mm (61.8–64.2 in)
- Height: 1,335–1,425 mm (52.6–56.1 in)
- Curb weight: 870–1,090 kg (1,920–2,400 lb)

The first-generation Carina was manufactured from December 1970, and sold at Toyota Store dealership channels in Japan, sharing its platform with the Toyota Celica sports coupe. Its European release took place in October 1971. Toyota was able to save development and tooling costs by building a family sedan and a sports car on the same platform and in the same factory. The Carina was a junior sedan and coupe to the larger Crown, and was similar sized to the Corona. Features included reclining seats with built-in head restraints, radio, clock, reversing lights and servo-assistance on the brakes.

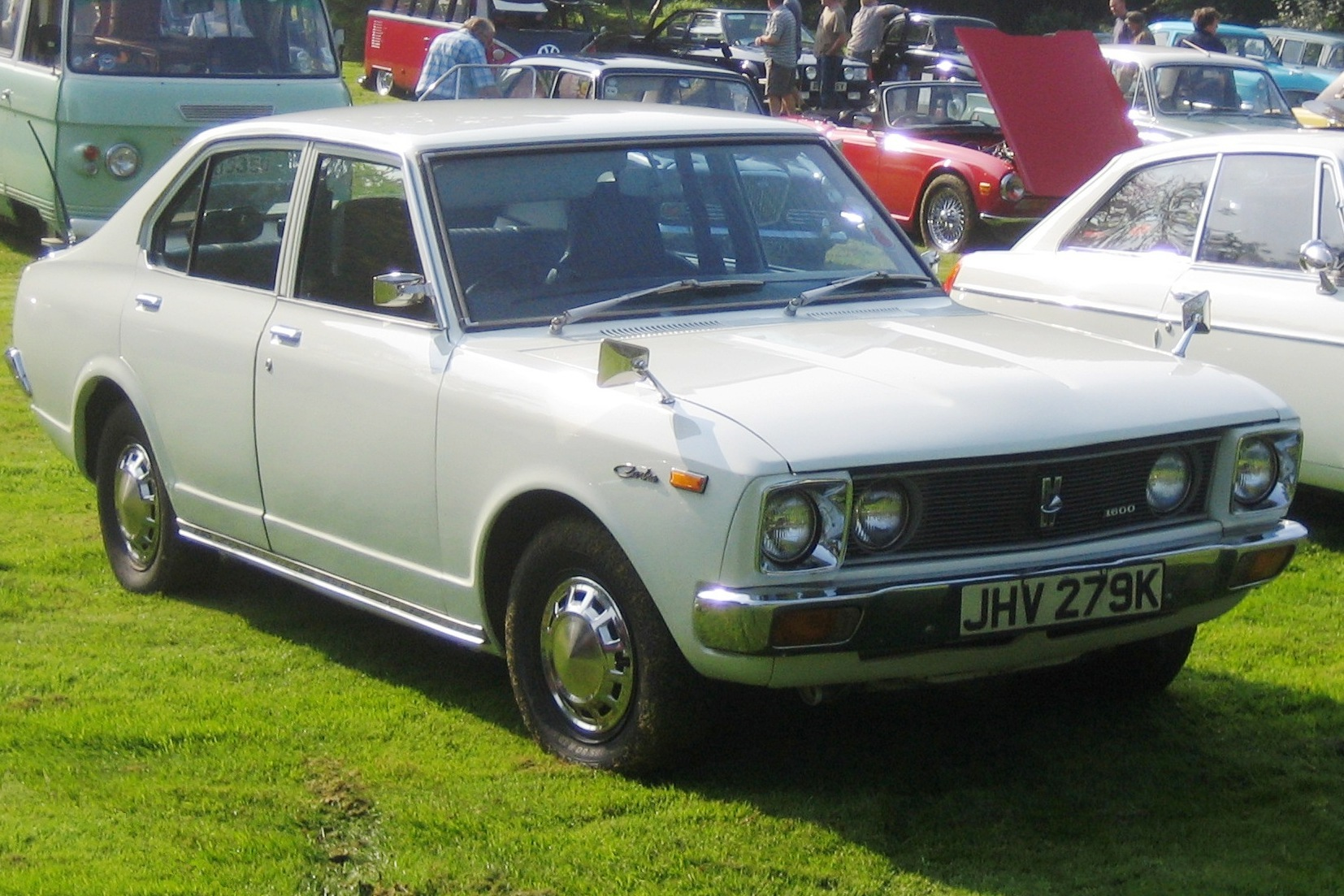
1971 Toyota Carina 1600 4-door sedan (TA12)

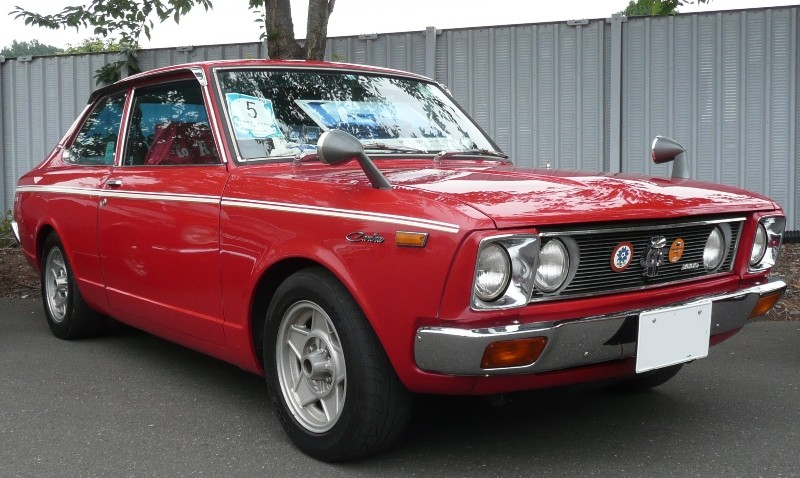
Pre-facelift model of Toyota Carina 1600GT 2-door sedan (TA12)

In 1971, the Carina 1600GT coupe was introduced as an alternative to the Corona 1600GT, using a 2T-G type 1600 DOHC engine shared with the Celica GT. The Corona 1600 GT was exclusive to Toyopet Store locations, the Carina 1600GT was exclusive to Toyota Store locations, and the Celica GT was exclusive to Toyota Corolla Store locations. The chassis code was A10, with A15, 17 and 18 being reserved for hardtop coupés. Excepting the anomalous RA16 hardtop, A16 and 19 were used on vans (utility wagons). Beginning in 1975, A30-series numbers were used for some hardtop coupés. The wagons/vans of the first generation were not regularly exported. Carina vans entered production in December 1975.

The A10 Carina was also exported to the US; its introduction and disappointing sales coinciding with the introduction of a 10% import duty. Cars destined for export were increasingly directed to European and other markets; US exports stopped after only two years; and Toyota continued its plans to manufacture in the USA.

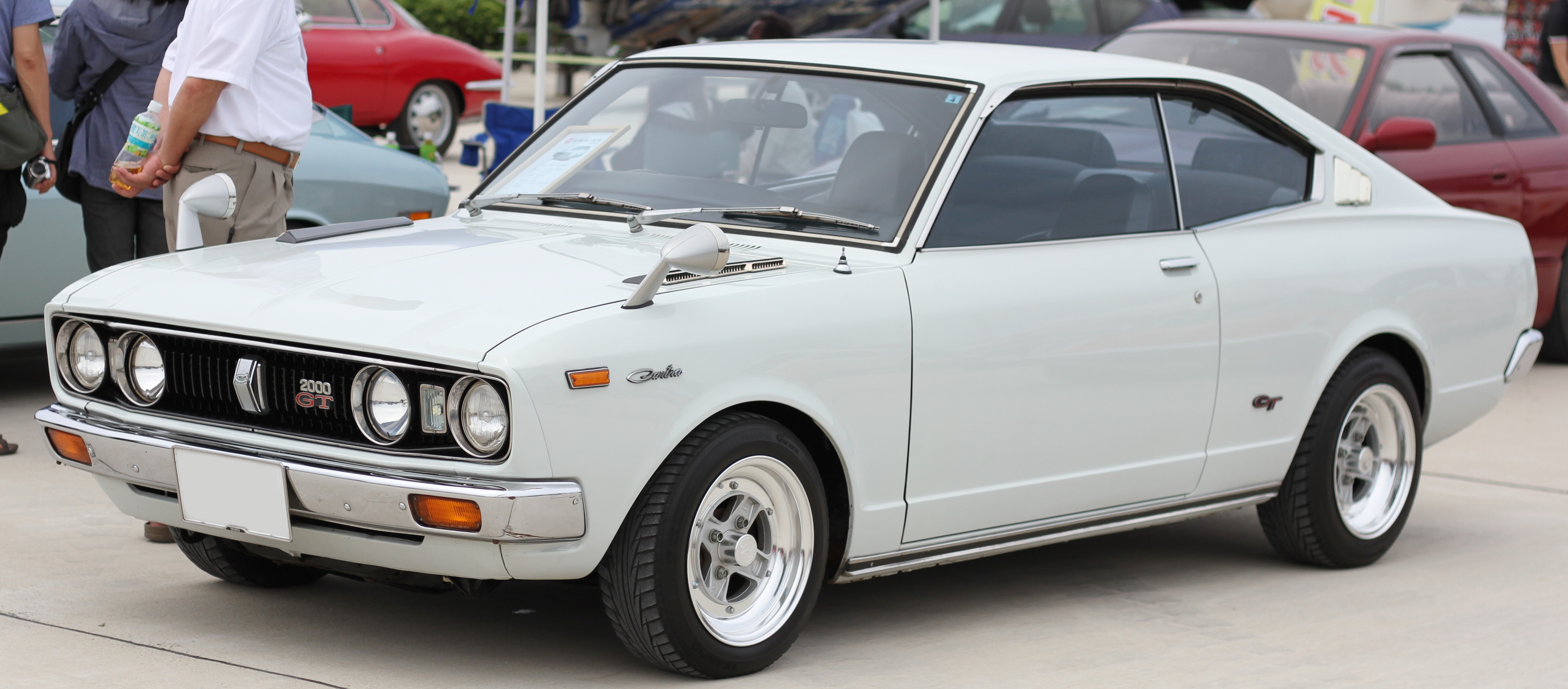
1975 Toyota Carina 2000GT hardtop coupe (RA17)

The original model usually featured a choice of a 1407 cc OHV (T) or 1588 cc OHV (2T) engine, choice of a four-speed manual gearbox, two-speed automatic gearbox or three-speed automatic gearbox and front-wheel disc brakes (drum brakes on the lowest model). It was revised in 1972 with a restyled body, new rear light cluster, filler cap repositioned in the rear quarter panel, restyled front grille and fascia. The specification was once again revised in 1974 including sealed cooling system, improved brakes, restyled wheels with flared wheel arches, and restyled interior fittings.

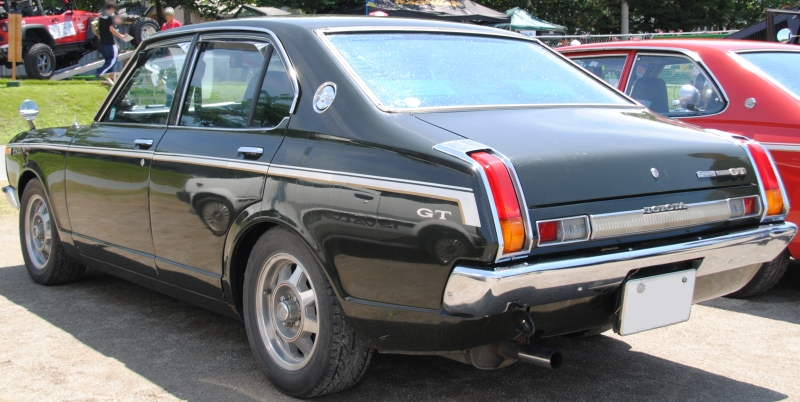
Toyota Carina 1600GT 4-door sedan (TA12), showing distinctive taillights

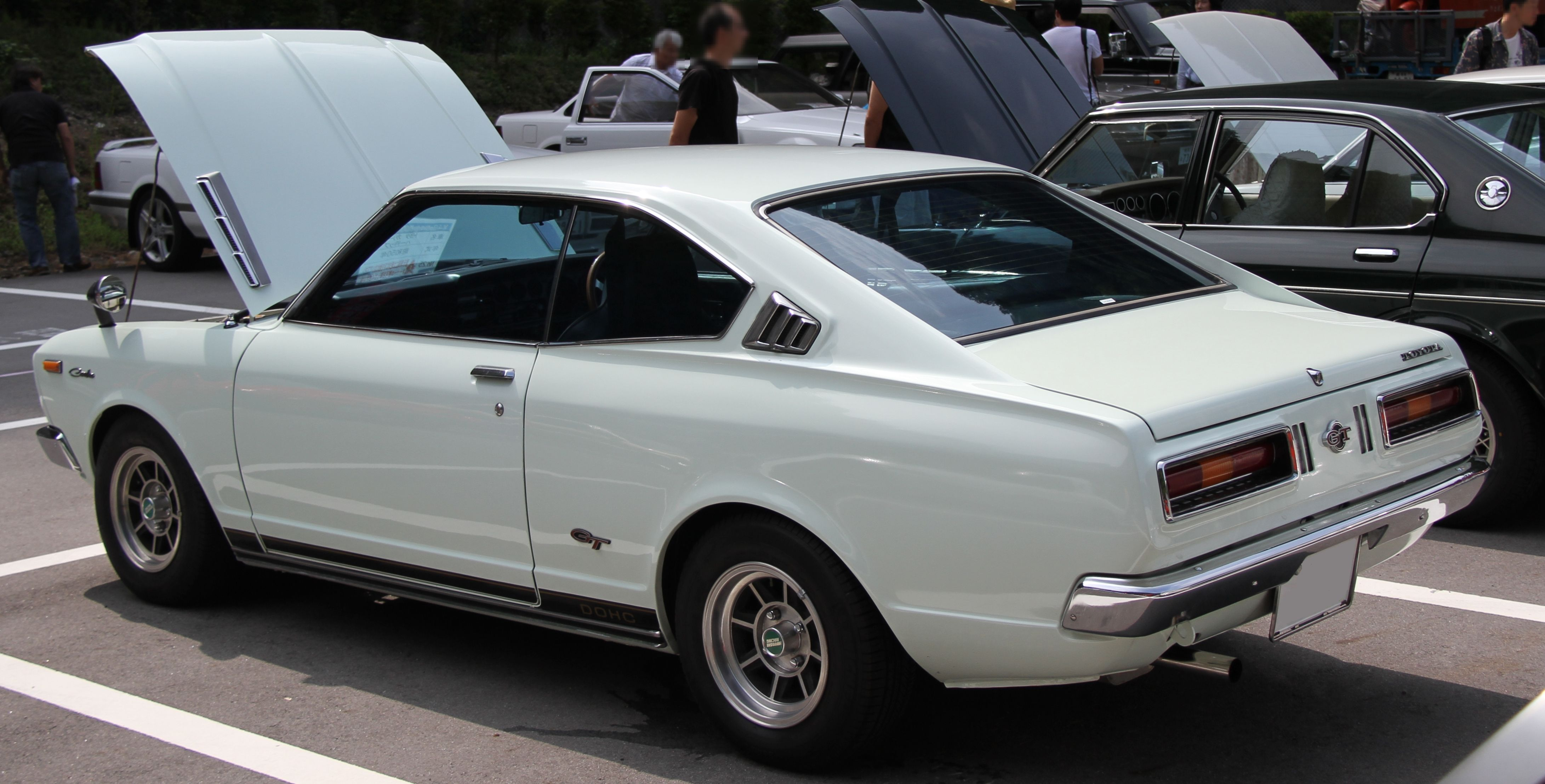
1975 Toyota Carina 1600GT hardtop coupe (TA17) with horizontal taillights

In late October 1975 (on sale 1 November), the Carina received a new front and rear-end styling, dual-line braking system with servo, and a repositioned handbrake and gear lever in a modified dashboard. The wheelbase and tread were increased slightly, as for the sister Celica series. Some chassis codes were accordingly changed, and the Japanese market cars received a plethora of altered engines, ranging from 1.4 to 2.0 litres.

Vehicles installed with engines with displacement at 1.5 litres or larger obligated Japanese owners to pay more annual road tax, and were considered top trim level packaged cars. Toyota introduced the "TTC-V" (Toyota Total Clean-Vortex) on the 19R engine only, using an exhaust gas recirculation implementation to comply with recently enacted emission regulations passed by the Japanese Government. The 1.4 was dropped from sedans and coupés, and a mid-range 1.8 was added at the time of the late 1975 facelift.

In December 1975 a Van version was developed, featuring the same facelifted front end. The new rear end uses the cargo door of the 30-series Corolla wagon. The Carina Van also received a very unusual opera-style side window in the cargo area, and was available with the 1400 or 1600 T-J/2T-J engines with 80 or 93 PS (59 or 68 kW). The Carina Van was generally not exported. The Van's TA16V/TA19V chassis codes continued to be used for the next-generation Van (which used the same rear axle and wheelbase), until the Van was facelifted again in August 1979. To bring these models in line with the second-generation Carina, they then received a new TA49 chassis code.

== Second generation (A40/A50; 1977–1981) ==
Second generation
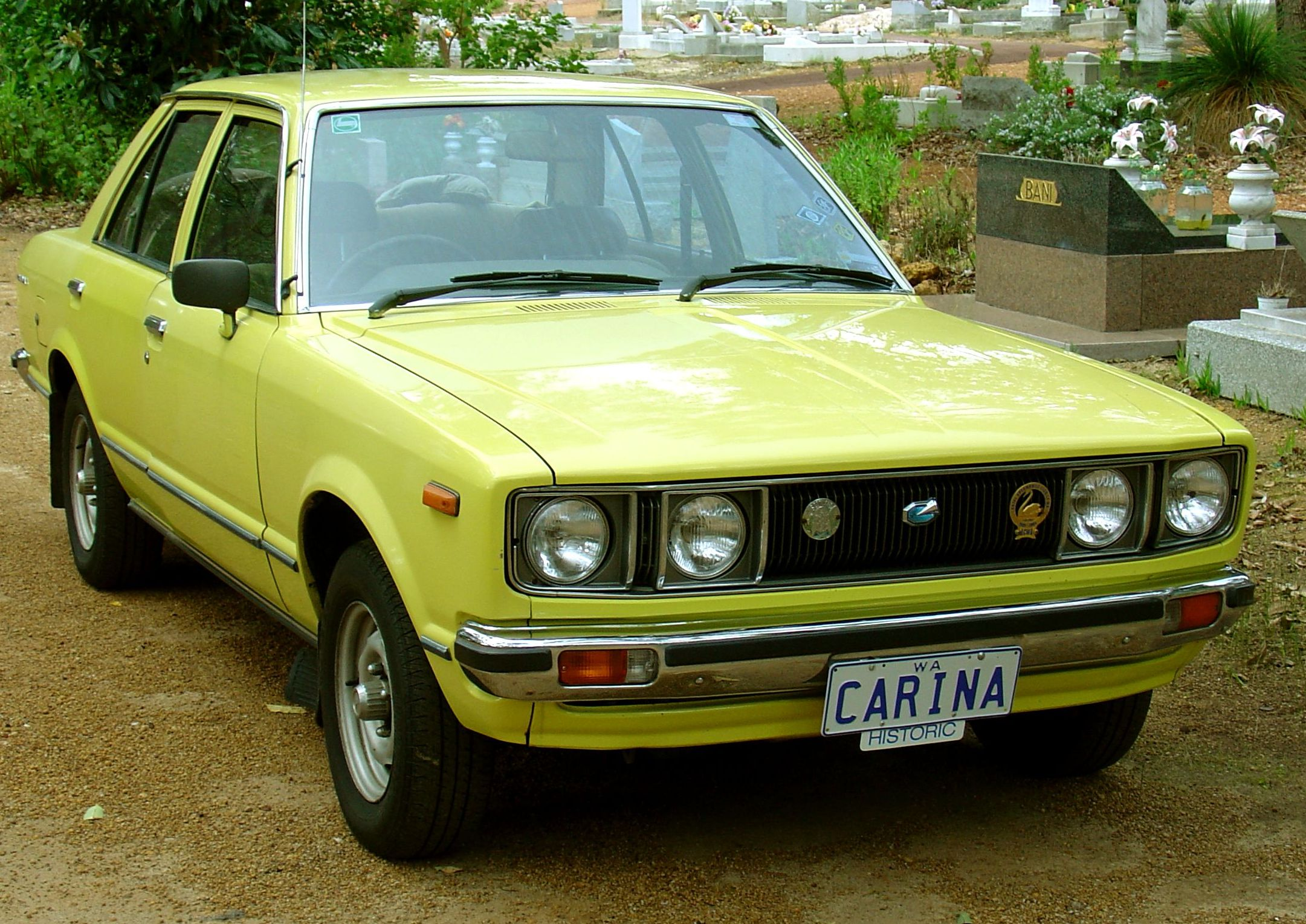
- Pre-facelift Toyota Carina sedan (Australia)

Overview
- Model code: A40/A50
- Production: 1977–1981
- Assembly: Japan: Toyota, Aichi

Body and chassis
- Body style: 2/4-door sedan; 2-door hardtop coupé; 5-door wagon/van
- Layout: Front-engine, rear-wheel drive
- Related: Toyota Celica; Toyota Celica Camry; Toyota Supra

Powertrain
- Engine: 1407 cc T-J OHV I4 (TA16V); 1588 cc 2T/2T-B/C/J OHV I4 (TA40/19V); 1588 cc 2T-GEU/GU DOHC I4 (TA40/45); 1588 cc 12T-U/J OHV I4 (TA41/49V); 1770 cc 13T-U OHV I4 (TA46); 1770 cc 3T/3T-C/EU/U OHV I4 (TA42/47/57); 1968 cc 18R-U SOHC I4 (RA40/55); 1968 cc 18R-GEU/GU DOHC I4 (RA40/45/55); 1973 cc 21R-U SOHC I4 (RA46/56)
- Transmission: 4/5-speed manual; 3/4-speed automatic

Dimensions
- Wheelbase: 2,500 mm (98.4 in); 2,495 mm (98.2 in) (Van)
- Length: 4,230–4,315 mm (166.5–169.9 in); 4,330–4,435 mm (170.5–174.6 in) (facelift)
- Width: 1,630 mm (64.2 in)
- Height: 1,345–1,390 mm (53.0–54.7 in)
- Curb weight: 935–1,085 kg (2,061–2,392 lb)

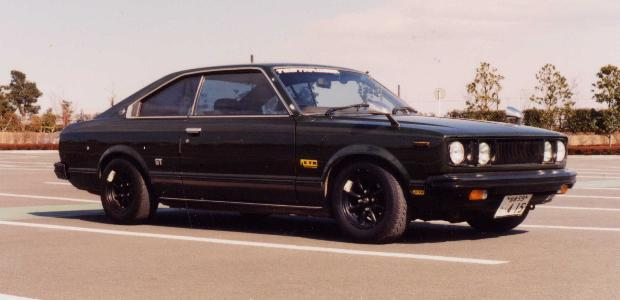
Pre-facelift Toyota Carina 2000GT Coupé (RA45, Japan)

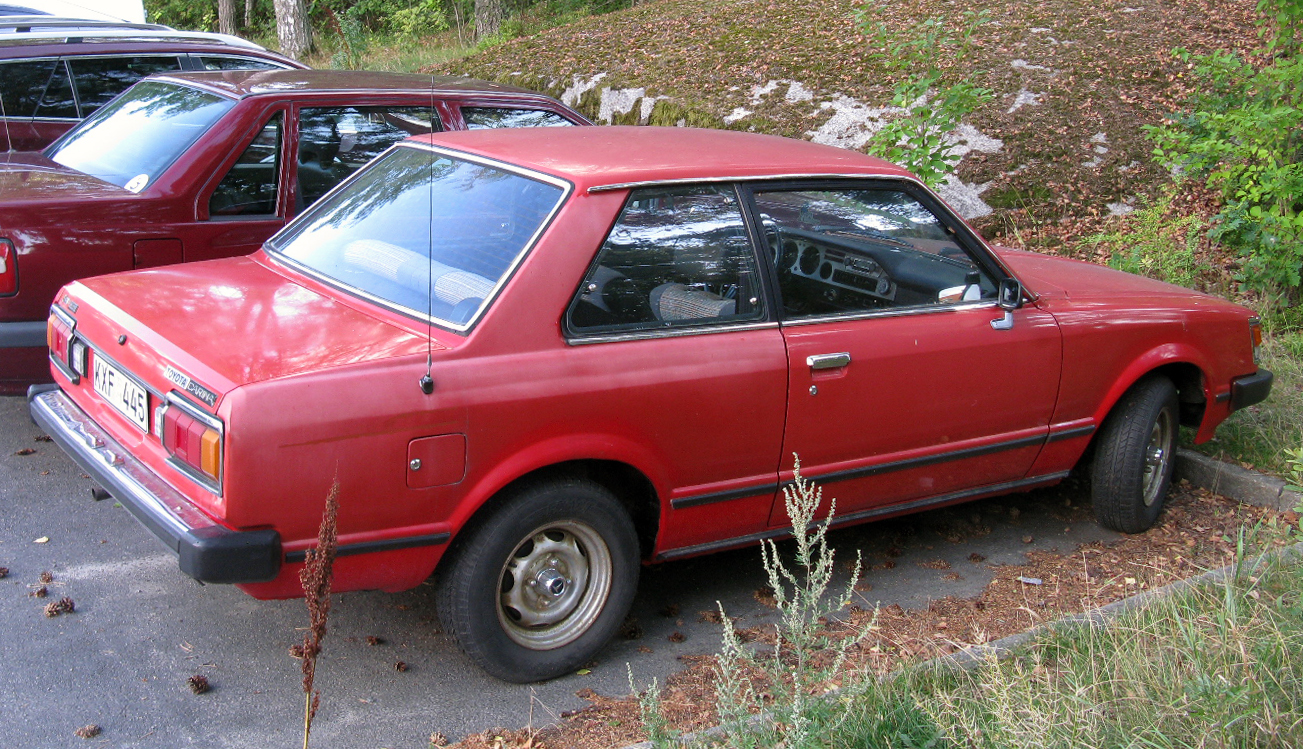
Toyota Carina 2-door sedan 1600 (TA40, Europe)

Released in Japan August 1977, the next-generation Carina was available in Germany in December 1977 and in other European countries during 1978. The chassis was mostly the same as that of the facelifted late Carinas of the first generation; the Van versions actually continued to use the old TA16/19 chassis codes in spite of receiving the new bodywork as they retained the old Van's underpinnings. In most markets Carinas were fitted with the same 1,588 cc 2T engine as its predecessor. In the Carina, an output of 75 PS (55 kW; 74 hp) DIN was claimed. The option of automatic transmission was new to many export markets. Japanese actor Sonny Chiba was the spokesman for the Carina in Japanese commercials for several decades.

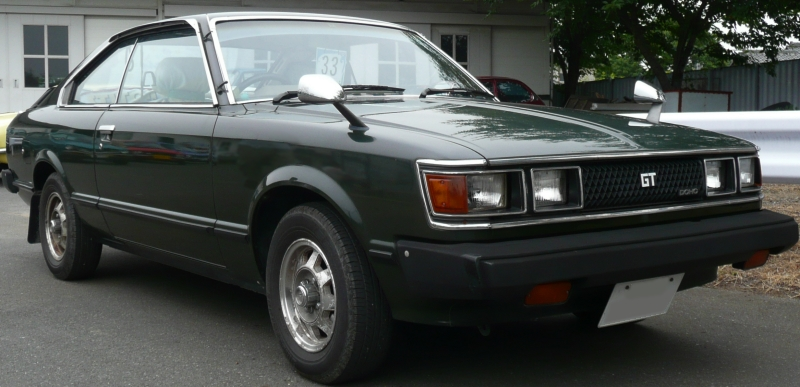
Facelift Toyota Carina 2000GT Coupé (RA45, Japan)

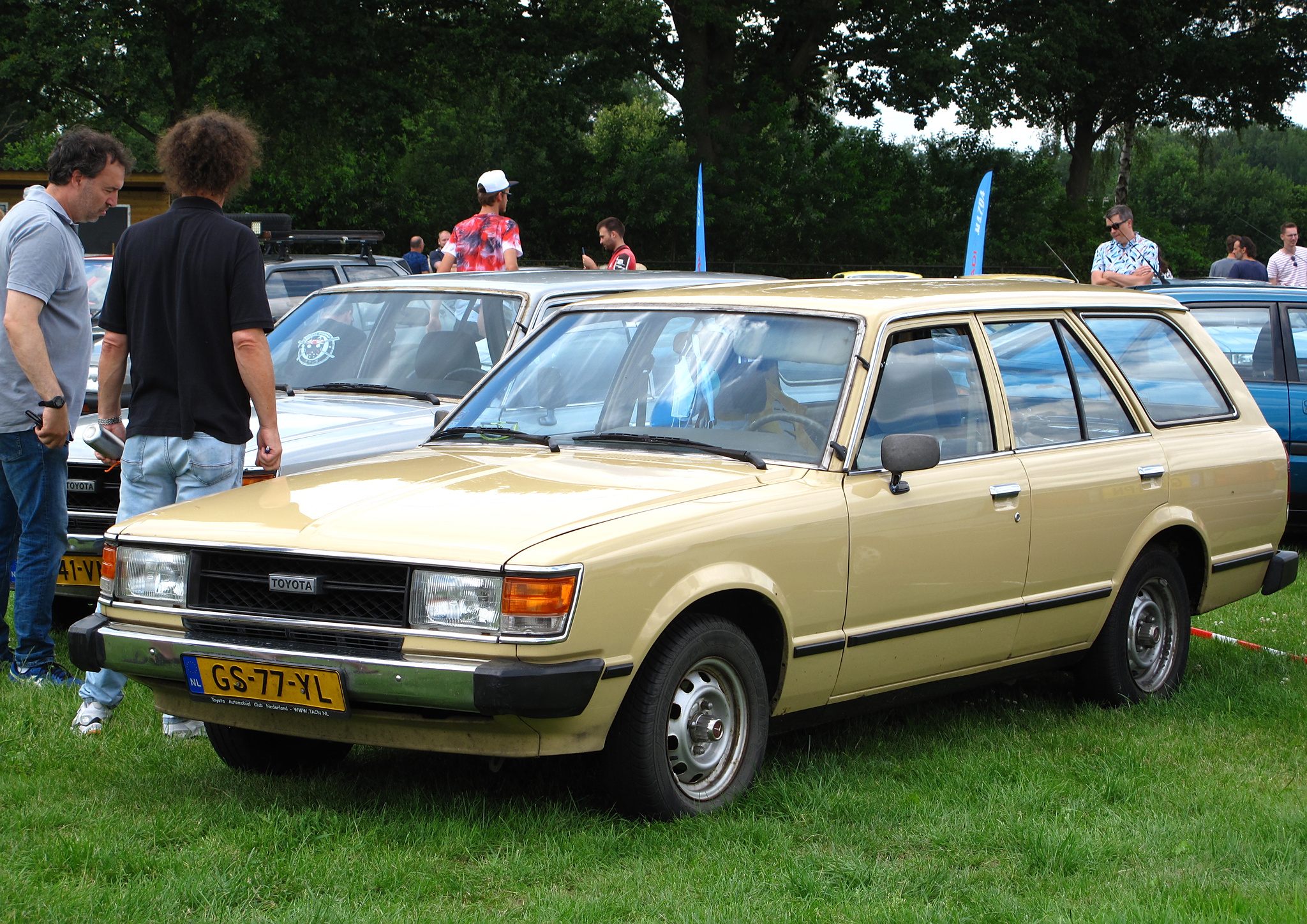
Facelift Toyota Carina Station Wagon 1600 Deluxe (TA40, Europe)

An estate car model was introduced to export markets for the first time, with the same heavy-duty leaf-spring rear suspension that had been seen on the late appearing first generation Carina Van, as it was intended for commercial use in Japan. In 1980, all models had revised front- and rear-end styling and headlights, and also received improved interiors. The following year, saloon and coupé models (but not the estate) were fitted with five-speed gearboxes as standard, still with optional automatic transmissions.

Starting with this generation, fuel injection was available optionally on top level models. In November 1977, the 3T-U 1,800 cc engine emissions are updated. In May 1978, the GT 1600 cc was added, and a three-speed automatic transmission became available. The 1600GT 2T-GEU engine was made to comply with the Showa 53 (1978) emissions regulation, while output improved from 110 PS (81 kW; 108 hp) to 115 PS (85 kW; 113 hp). The options list was updated to include a urethane bumper for impact improvement.

In September 1978, the 3T-EU engine (1,770 cc OHV EFI) was installed in the ST-EFI and SR-EFI models, initially only with a five-speed manual. At the same time, the 2000GT with DOHC 18R-GU and the 18R-GEU EFI engine, fit 1978 exhaust emission regulations, as did the 18R-U and 21R-U engines. The emblem was changed to "TOYOTA" from "TOYOTA CARINA". The 2000GT hardtop coupe shared a platform with the Celica, which gave Toyota the ability to sell the Celica at a different Japanese Toyota dealership called Toyota Store as the Celica was exclusive to Toyota Corolla Store locations.

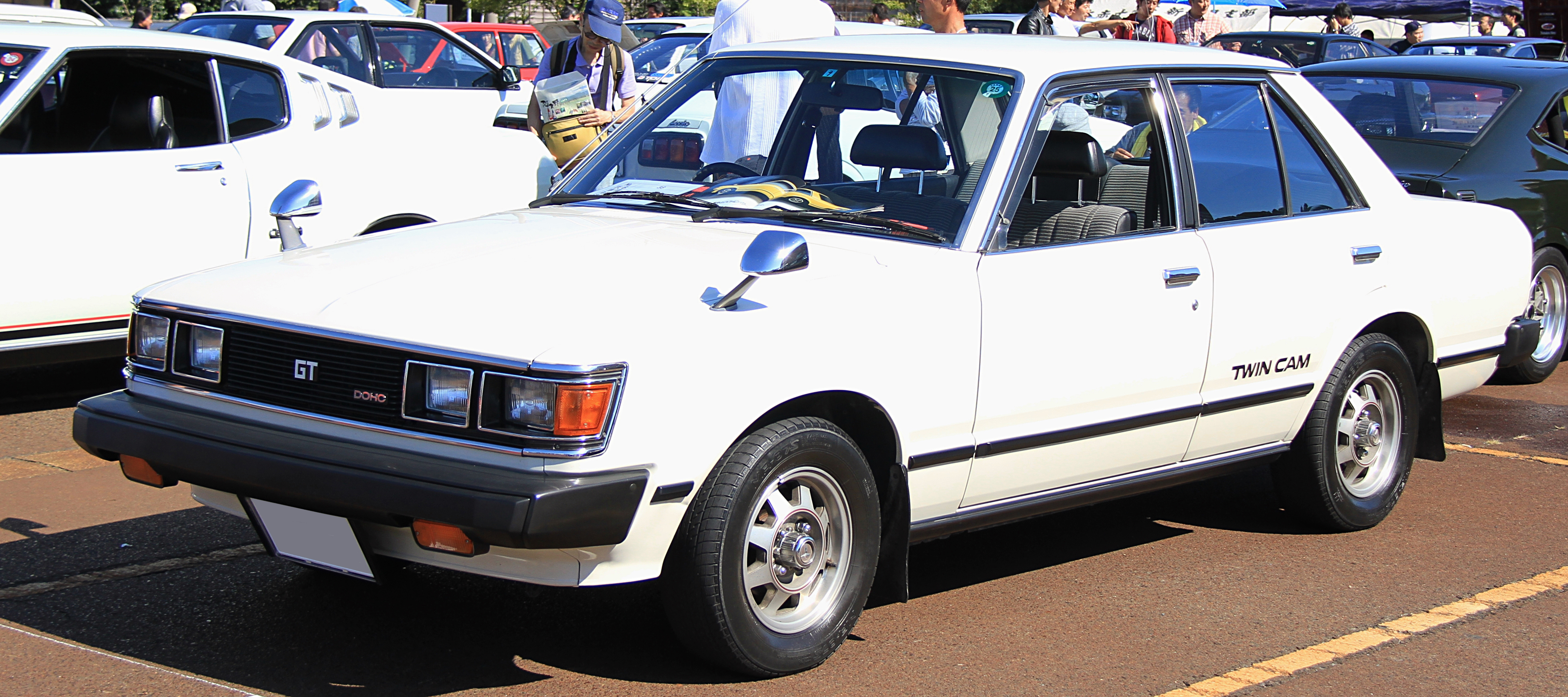
1981 Toyota Carina 1600GT sedan (TA45, Japan)

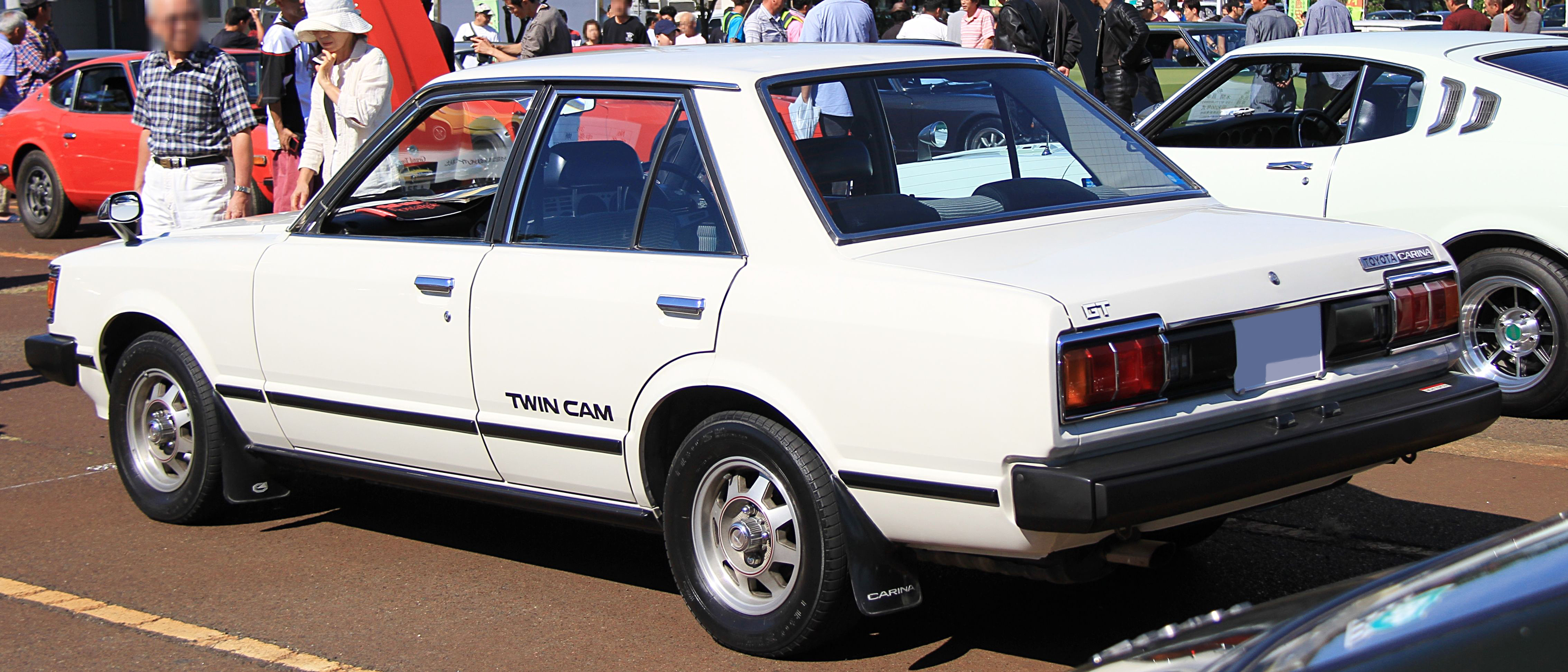
1981 Toyota Carina 1600GT sedan (TA45, Japan)

In August 1979, the front of the vehicle received a major change that now included four headlamp lights rather than the previous setup, with the Van remaining with four round lamps. The rear received a changed license plate mounting to give it a new style. 3T-EU and 21R-U engines were now available with the four-speed automatic transmission. These two, along with the 18R-GEU, were now the only engines offered (in Japan). The rear suspension became of the semi-trailing type, becoming the A50 series Carina in the process. The Super Deluxe two-door sedan was discontinued, as was the 1400 Van. The 1600 Van received the 12T-J engine and the option of an automatic transmission, along with a chassis code now in line with the remainder of the Carina range (TA49V).

As of August 1980, the EFI specification 1800 Hard Top (ST-EFI, SR-EFI) was the only engine offered in the sedans/coupés.

=== Celica Camry (1980–1982) ===
Toyota utilised the A40/A50 series Carina as the basis for the Celica Camry, a four-door sports sedan launched in Japan during January 1980, and sold at Toyota Corolla Store dealerships. It was a companion to the Carina which was exclusive to Toyota Store locations. Positioned as the sedan counterpart to the Toyota Celica (A40 and A50) two-door coupé and three-door liftback, the Celica Camry shared few components with this model. Instead, Toyota altered the front-end of its Carina, incorporating styling cues resembling those of the 1978–1981 Celica XX (known as the Celica Supra in export markets). From August 1980, the Celica Camry also went on sale through Toyota's recently introduced Vista dealership chain.

Powered by either a 1.6-litre 12T-U engine producing 88 PS (65 kW) JIS and 128 N⋅m (94 lbf⋅ft) or a 1.8-litre 13T-U engine producing 95 PS (70 kW) and 147 N⋅m (108 lbf⋅ft), Toyota also offered a fuel-injected 1.8-litre (105 PS or 77 kW) and a 2.0-litre (21R-U) with producing the same power. Towards the end of its model lifecycle, Toyota introduced a sports version of the Celica Camry equipped with the double overhead camshaft 2.0-litre 18R-GEU engine from the Celica producing 135 PS (99 kW).

It has an identical 2,500 mm (98 in) wheelbase to the Celica and Carina, while all three models (as well as the Corona) have near-identical exterior dimensions. During its model cycle, over 100,000 units were sold in Japan. Toyota also exported the Celica Camry to several markets as the Carina, replacing the second-generation Carina's front-end styling in those markets. These export market hybrids used a different rear-end design and were also available with station wagon bodywork. The Celica Camry shared the performance image of the Chaser, which was exclusive to Toyota Auto Store dealerships in Japan.

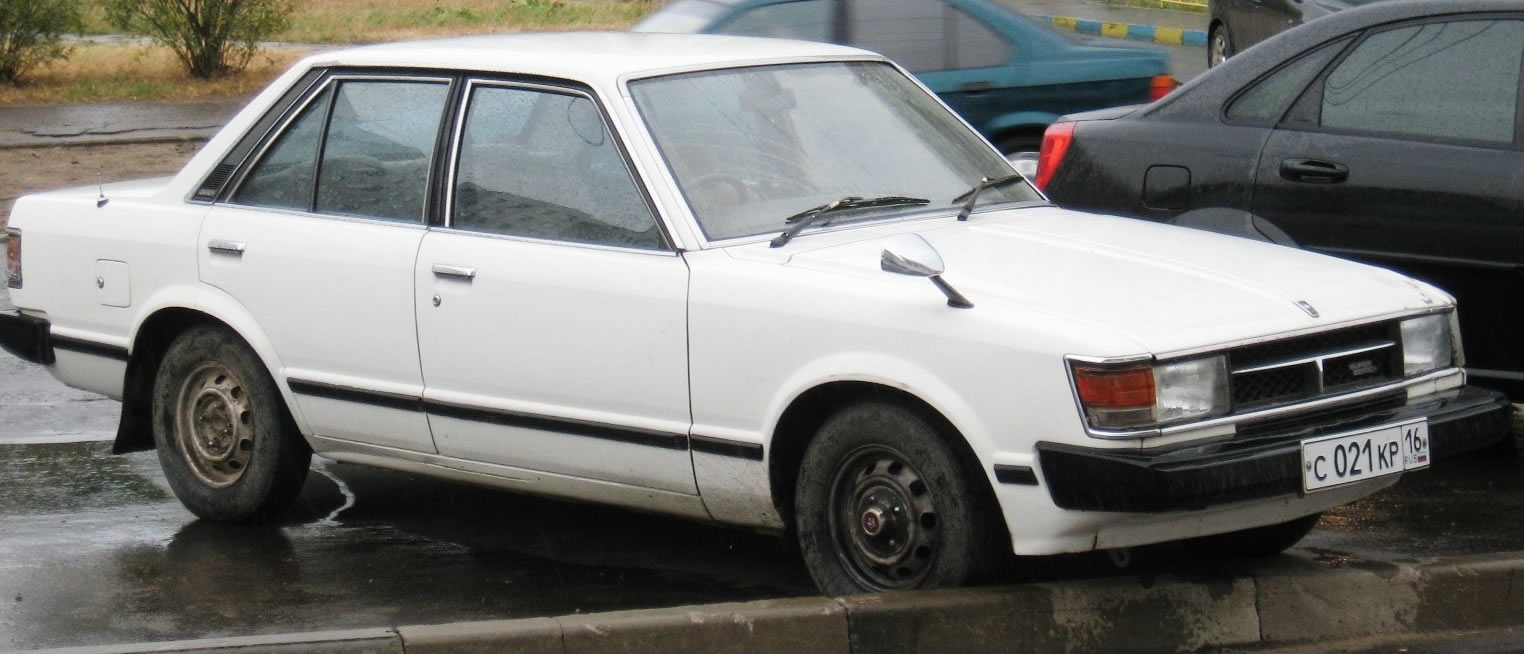
Celica Camry XT Super Edition (Japan)

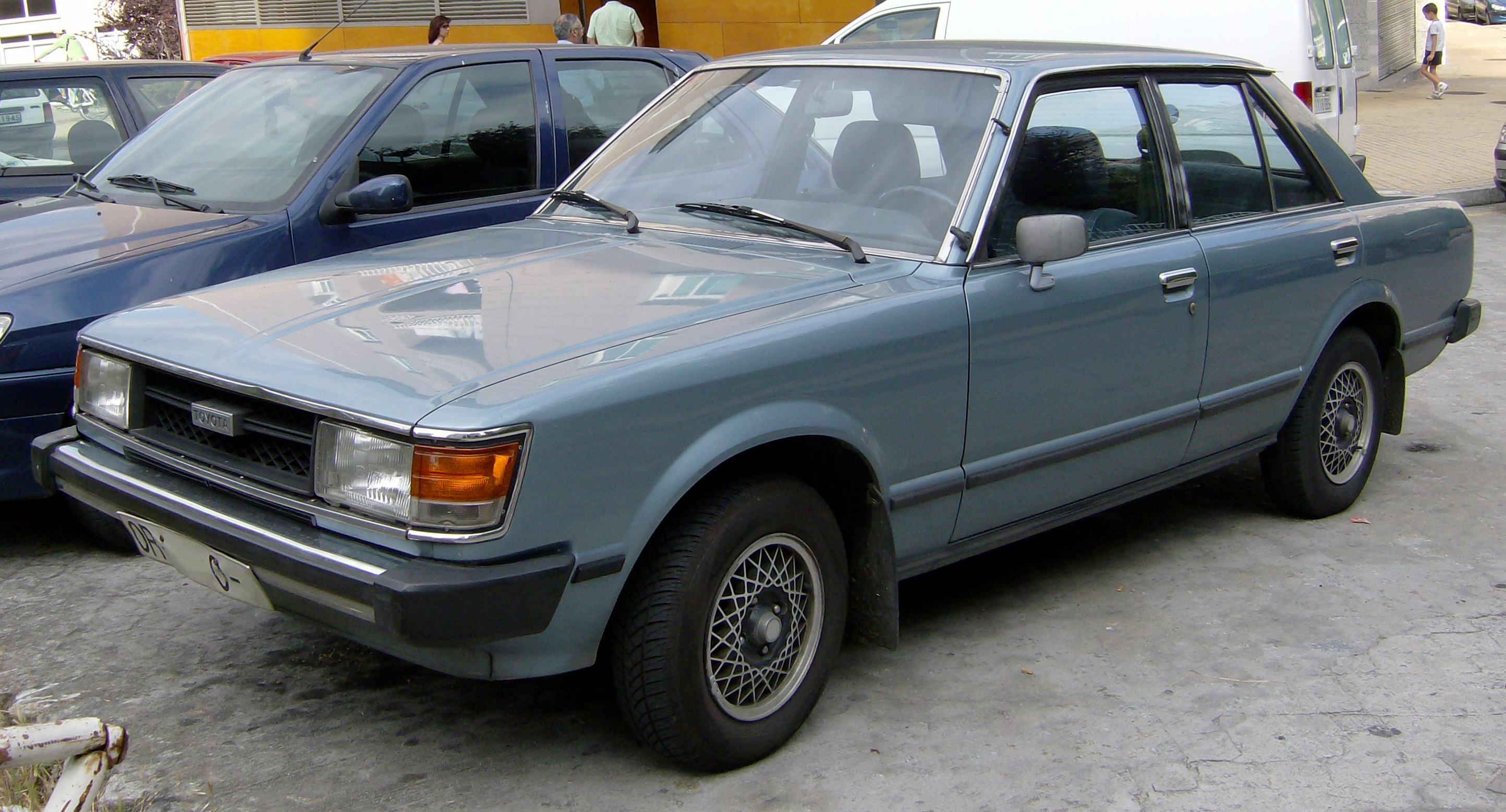
European market facelifted Carina (TA40), which shares its front-end with the Celica Camry.

== Third generation (A60; 1981) ==
Third generation
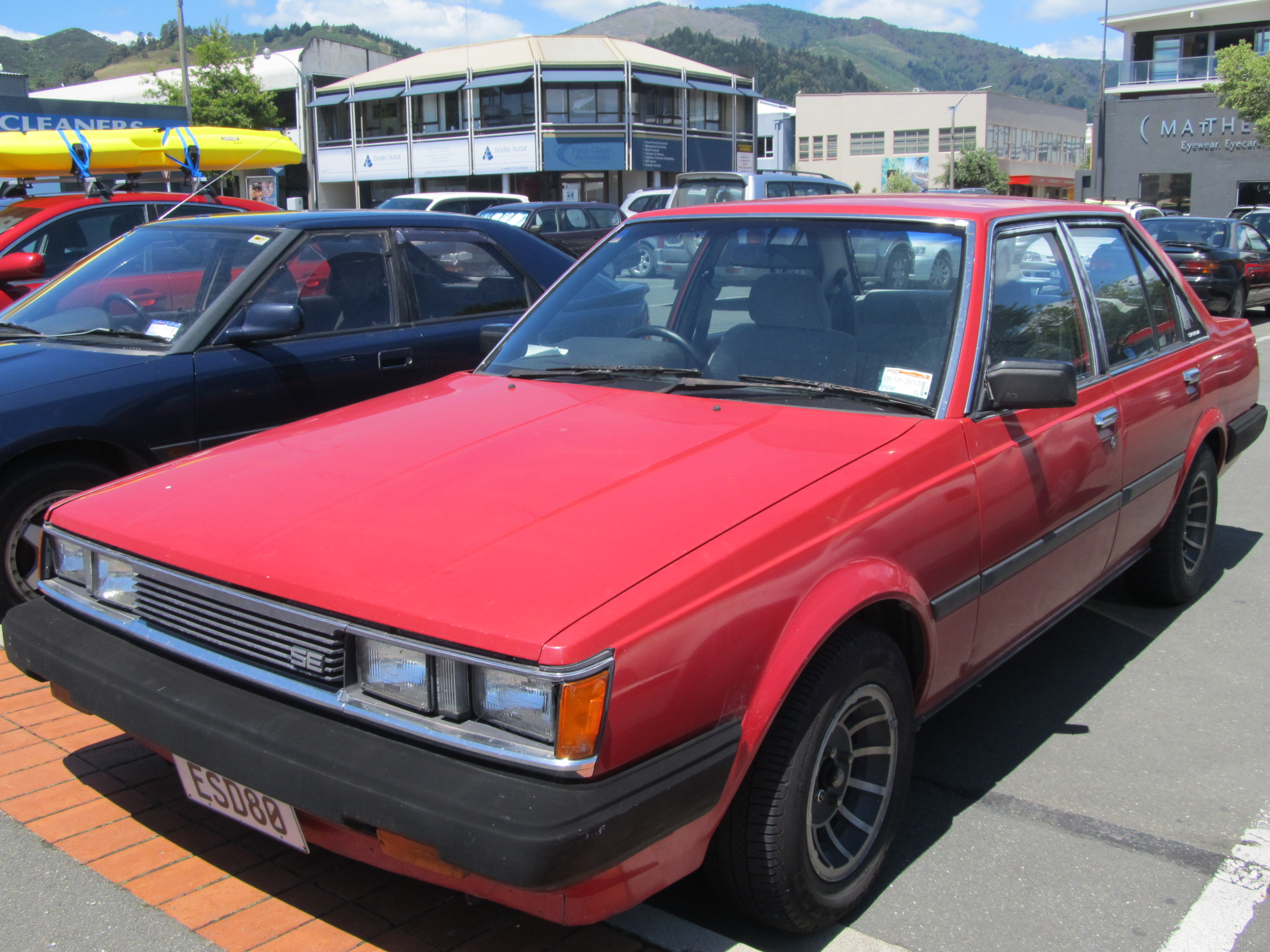
- 1983 Toyota Carina SE

Overview
- Model code: A60
- Production: 1981–1988 (Sedan/Van); 1981–1985 (Coupé); 1982–1988 (Surf)
- Assembly: Japan: Toyota, Aichi

Body and chassis
- Body style: 3-door liftback coupé; 4-door sedan; 5-door wagon/van
- Layout: Front-engine, rear-wheel drive
- Related: Toyota Celica; Toyota Supra

Powertrain
- Engine: Petrol: 1452 cc 3A-U SOHC I4 (AA60); 1486 cc 5K-J OHV I4 (KA67V); 1587 cc 4A-GEU DOHC I4 (AA63); 1588 cc 2T OHV I4 (TA60/61); 1588 cc 2T-GEU DOHC I4 (TA60); 1588 cc 12T-J OHV I4 (TA67V); 1770 cc 3T/3T-C/3T-EU OHV I4 (TA62); 1770 cc 3T-GTE DOHC I4 turbo (TA63); 1832 cc 1S-U I4 (SA60); 1968 cc 18R-GEU DOHC I4 (RA63); Diesel: 1839 cc 1C I4 (CA60/67V)
- Transmission: 4/5-speed manual; 3/4-speed automatic

Dimensions
- Wheelbase: 2,500 mm (98.4 in)
- Length: 4,385 mm (172.6 in) - 4,470 mm (176.0 in)
- Width: 1,650 mm (65.0 in)
- Height: 1,365 mm (53.7 in) - 1,425 mm (56.1 in)
- Curb weight: 995 kg (2,194 lb) - 1,135 kg (2,502 lb)

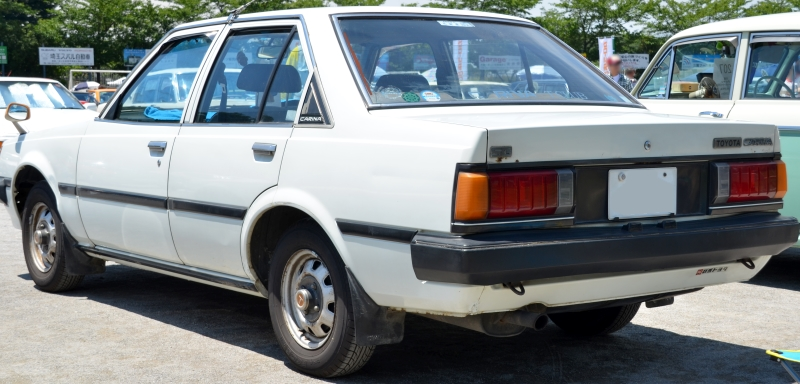
Rear view of Toyota Carina 1500 SG (AA60, Japan)

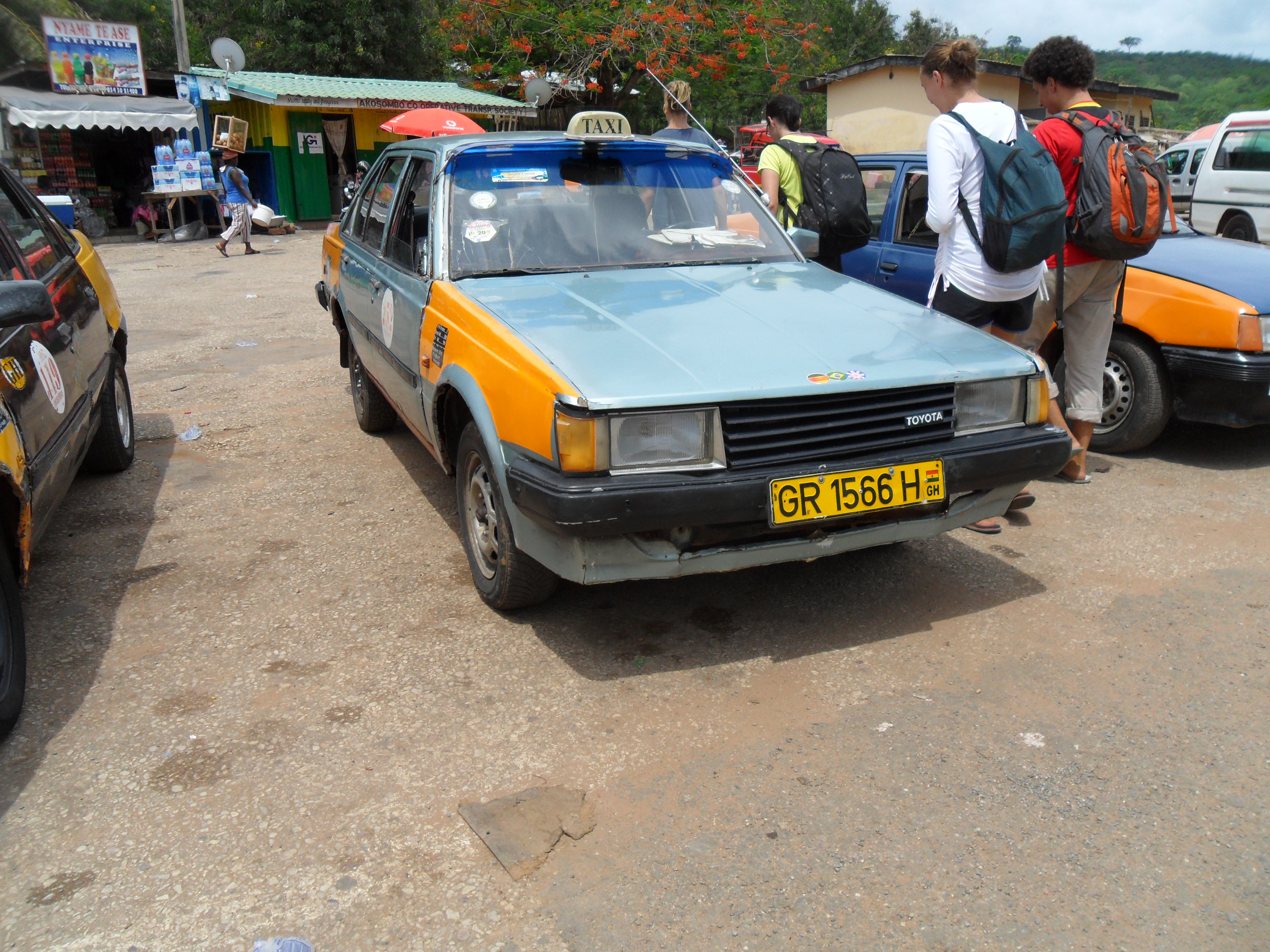
Alternative version of Toyota Carina A60 with single square headlights

In its third incarnation, the Carina followed the fashion of the time with a still more angular overall look and four square headlights. The Coupé was no longer a hardtop and was updated with halogen rectangular headlights, which were also installed on the Carina Surf (wagon) and were used in export, while the Carina Van received twin, round headlamps set in a black plastic surround. The car followed its predecessors in retaining a front-engine rear-wheel-drive configuration even though by then competitor manufacturers were following a trend of switching to front-wheel drive in this class. The third generation was first released two months after the related Celica, in September 1981, and was the last Carina to use rear-wheel drive. More precise rack and pinion steering replaced the recirculating ball used in previous generations; the A60 Carina used a MacPherson struts up front and a five-link, solid rear axle – except for the more powerful, fuel injected versions which have independent (semi-trailing arm) suspension at the rear. The RWD Corona shared its chassis with this vehicle, when it was updated the succeeding year. The Carina was famously used by private teams racing for Japan in the Dakar Rally in the two-wheel-drive class for both 1981 and 1982. The Carina managed to achieve four championships in the marathon class divisions.

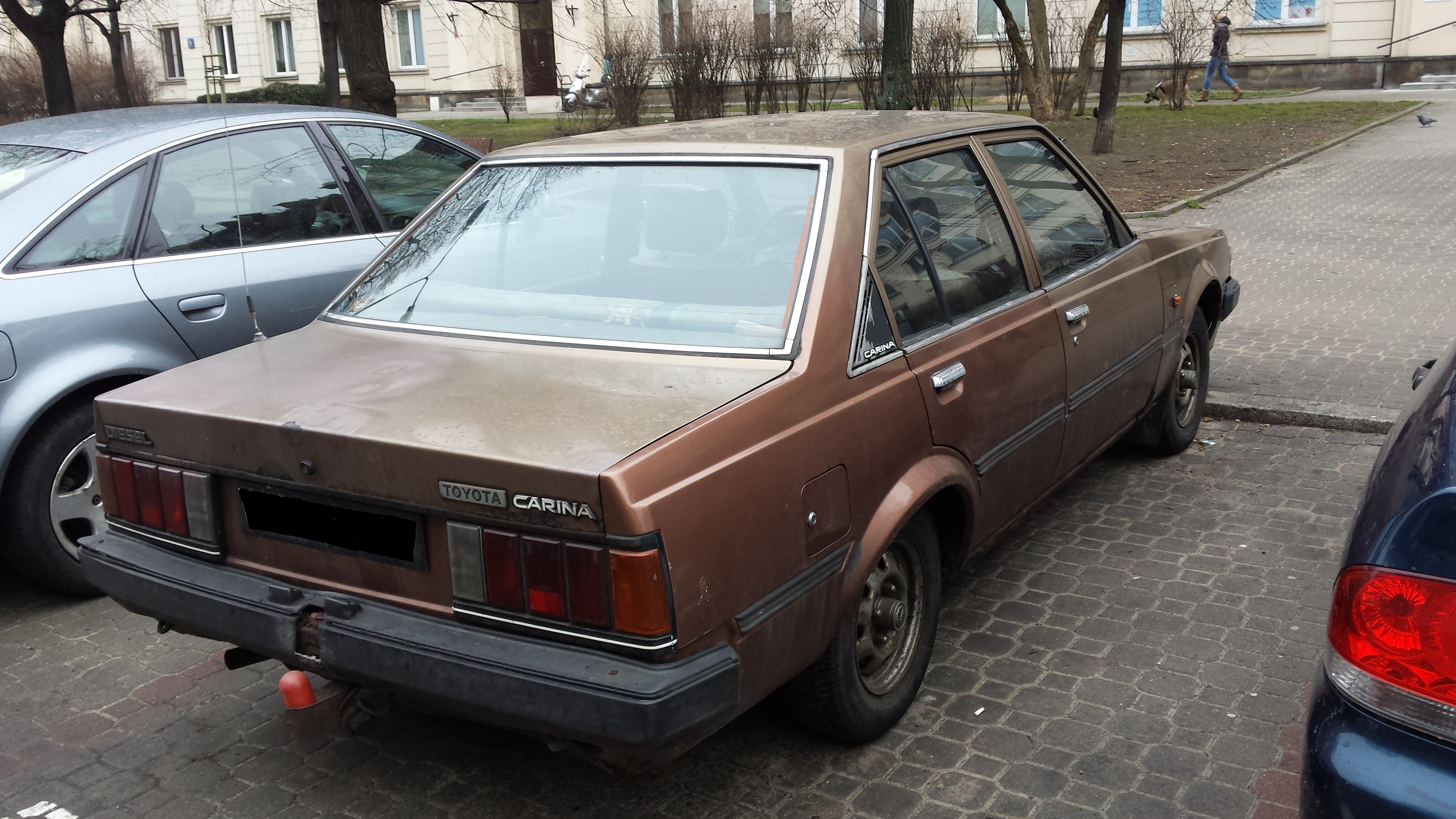
Rear view of Toyota Carina diesel (CA60, Europe)

In February 1982, a five-door wagon series based on the Van was added, marketed as the "Carina Surf" (SA60G) in Japan. In export markets, wagons had been available since the introduction of the van model. The 1C diesel engine was also added to the lineup at this time. This 1839 cc unit had a claimed output of 65 PS (48 kW) at 4500 rpm and was offered in markets where fuel pricing and availability rendered it appropriate. This engine was available to European buyers, along with the 75 PS (55 kW) 2T (1.6) and 86 PS (63 kW) 3T or 80 PS (59 kW) 3T-C (1.8) petrol engines. The European Carinas all received the independent rear suspension reserved for higher-end models in Japan, although the station wagon retained the live rear axle. Introduced in Europe for 1982, the rear-wheel-drive Carina was typically replaced by the Carina II in early 1984.

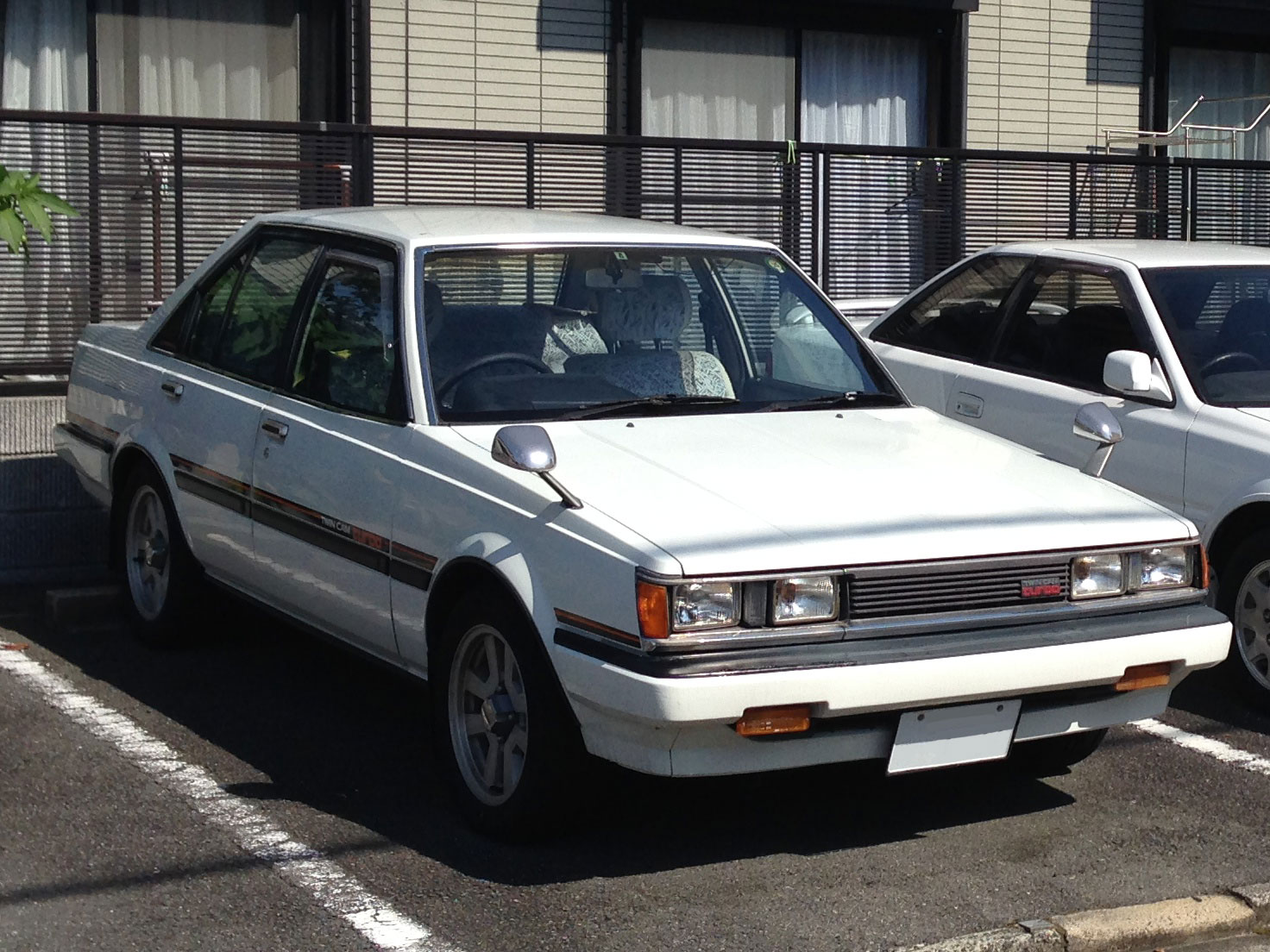
Toyota Carina 1800 GT-T (TA63, Japan)

The Japanese market 1800SE had power windows, and an 1800SE "Extra Edition" trim level was added in June 1982. In May 1982, the better equipped 1500 SE trim level was added. In October 1982, the Turbo DOHC engine (3T-GTEU, 1770 cc and 160 PS (118 kW) in the Touring Super Coupé trim level) with the "GT-TR" trim level was added. Celica and Corona were released with the same powerplant simultaneously. Conversely, the 18R-GEU-engined 2000GT hardtop coupé was no longer available, and was replaced by the next-generation Carina ED four-door hardtop in 1985.

In May 1983, minor changes were done to the whole range, excepting the vans. Power mirrors were added, while the front grille and the taillights were redesigned. The 1600GT sports model replaced the 2T-GEU engine with the all new 4A-GEU engine, also a 1600 cc DOHC unit but now with 16 valves. The 3T-EU engine was no longer offered.

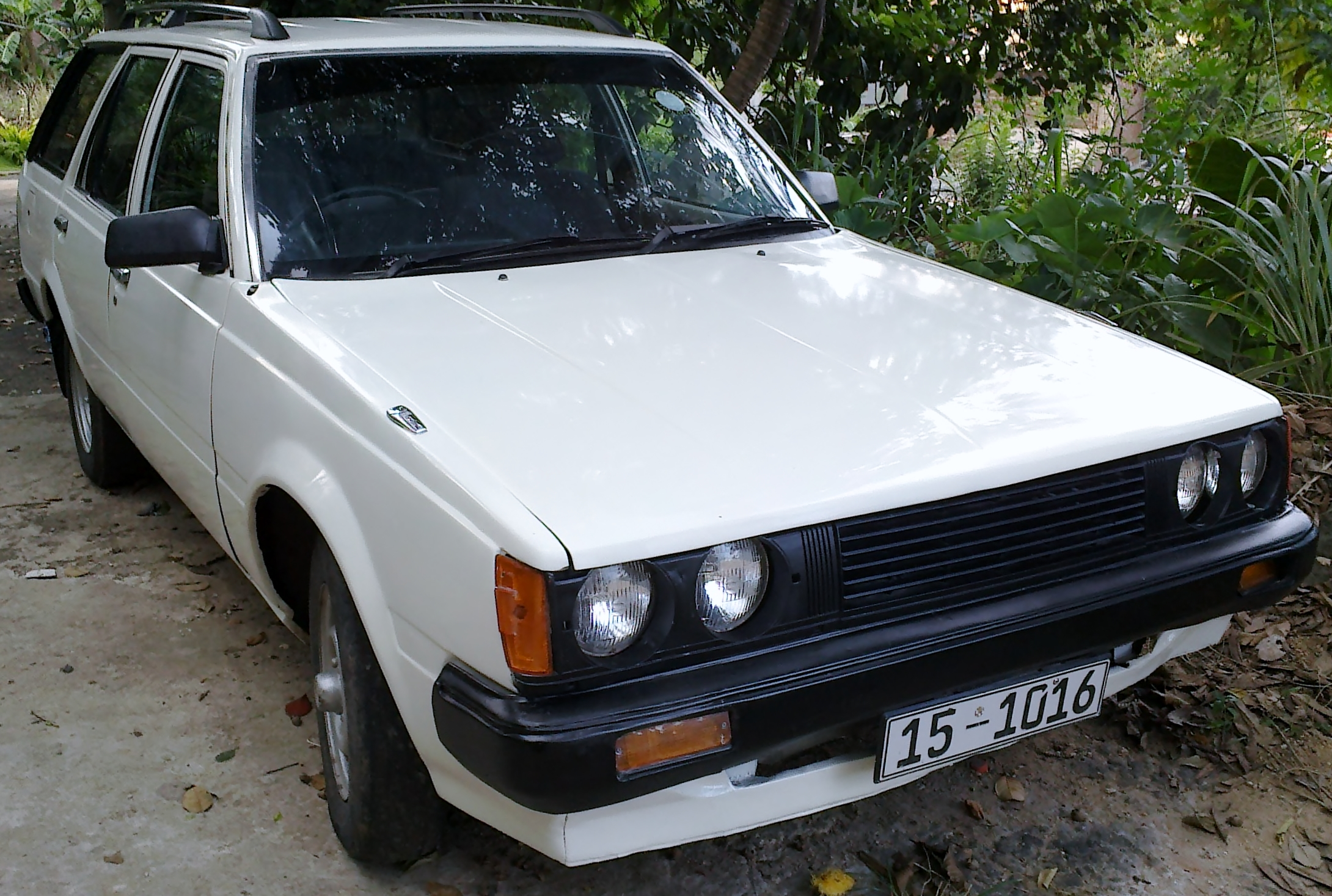
1984 Toyota Carina Wagon (KA67V)

In August 1983, a series of minor changes to the Carina Van took place. The 12T-J 1600 cc OHV engine was replaced with the lighter and more economical 1.5-litre 5K-J type.

In May 1984, the front-wheel-drive four-door sedan "Carina FF" (T150 chassis) was introduced in addition to the rear-wheel-drive sedan range. Coupé, Surf (Wagon), and vans were sold continuously. Minor changes also took place, including body-coloured bumpers for higher grade models. In August 1985, the trim levels were changed to shift the Sports models (1600GT, 1600GT-R, 1800GT-T, 1800GT-TR) into the front-wheel-drive range. Rear-wheel-drive coupé sales were terminated at the same time. The sedan lineup was now reduced to 1500 standard, DX, SG, and 1800 SG trim levels. Surf and van sales continued as heretofore. Front-engine, rear-wheel-drive Carinas continued to be produced alongside the new T150 series until May 1988 in Surf, van, and sedan models.

== Fourth generation (T150; 1984) ==
Fourth generation
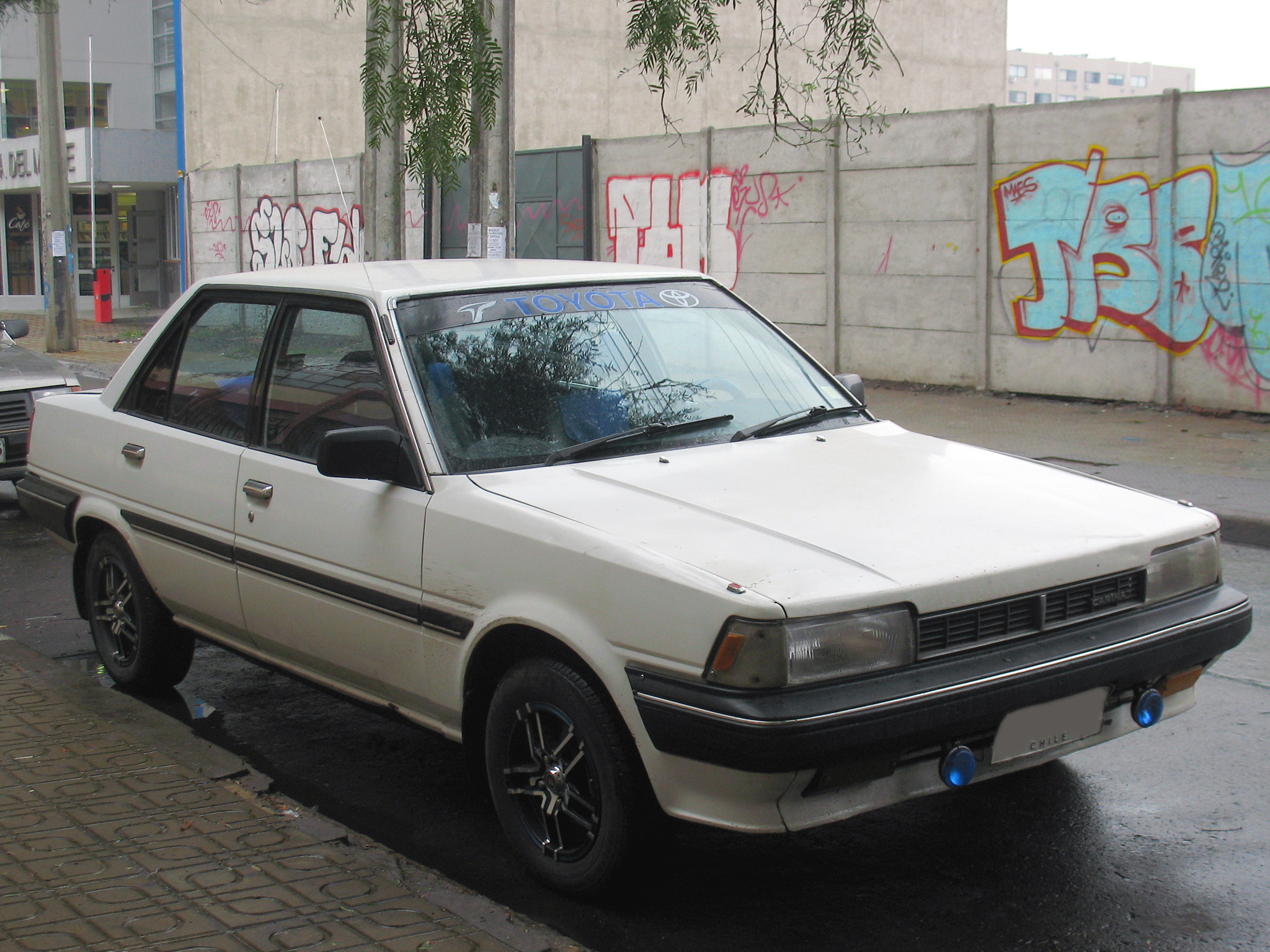
- Toyota Carina 1.5 SG (AT150, facelift)

Overview
- Model code: T150; T160
- Production: 1984–1988
- Assembly: Toyota, Aichi, Japan

Body and chassis
- Body style: 4-door sedan
- Layout: Front-engine, front-wheel drive
- Related: Toyota Carina II; Toyota Carina ED; Toyota Corona (T150); Toyota Celica (T160)

Powertrain
- Engine: Petrol: 1452 cc 3A-LU SOHC I4 (AT150); 1587 cc 4A-ELU SOHC I4 (AT151); 1587 cc 4A-GEU DOHC I4 (AT160); 1832 cc 1S-iLU SOHC I4 (ST150/151); 1998 cc 3S-GEU DOHC I4 (ST162); Diesel: 1973 cc 2C-L SOHC I4 (CT150)
- Transmission: 3/4-speed automatic; 4/5-speed manual

Dimensions
- Wheelbase: 2,515 mm (99.0 in)
- Length: 4,335–4,350 mm (170.7–171.3 in)
- Width: 1,670 mm (65.7 in)
- Height: 1,365 mm (53.7 in)
- Curb weight: 910–1,060 kg (2,010–2,340 lb)

Starting from the fourth generation, the Carina shared the Corona's front-wheel drive platform for four-door sedans, differing only in having more angular sheet metal. The Carina RWD platform of the Carina Surf, and Carina Van continued to use the Toyota "A" series platform until 1988. The Carina continued to be exclusive in Japan to Toyota Store locations, while the Corona remained exclusive to Toyopet Store locations. After the Carina platform was realigned to the Toyota Corona "T" platform, shared with the Celica coupé and hatchback, the rear-wheel-drive Carina Coupé was cancelled once the Carina ED "four-door coupé" was introduced in August 1985. Between the Carina and Corona lines, Toyota expected a three-to-two proportion of front-wheel-drive to rear-wheel-drive models.

In May 1984, the Carina FF four-door sedan (T150 series) was introduced. The styling echoed that of the previous generation, using four headlights and grille setup. The upper trim level model has aerodynamic headlight option. Rather than replace the entire line-up all at once because sales of the previous generation were still good, Toyota gradually introduced the replacement Van and Wagon models in stages. The 1,800 cc engine has electronically controlled distributorless ignition, and a 2,000 cc diesel is added. Other 1600 cc EFI "4A-ELU" engine, and a carburetor is used on the 1500 cc with "3A-LU" type engine. The 1800SE models were still offered.

August 1985, the Sport model 1600GT, 1600GT-R, and 2000GT-R were added to the lineup. All with twin-cam engines, they received the T160 chassis code. The 1.6s use the "4A-GELU" engine while two-litres use the "3S-GELU" engine. The sport models had altered chassis, also the wheels were upgraded from four lug nuts to five.

May 1986, had minor changes to the entire range. The design of the grille and taillights was changed. Due to the success of the 1800SE trim level, the similarly equipped but smaller-engined 1500SG Extra was added.

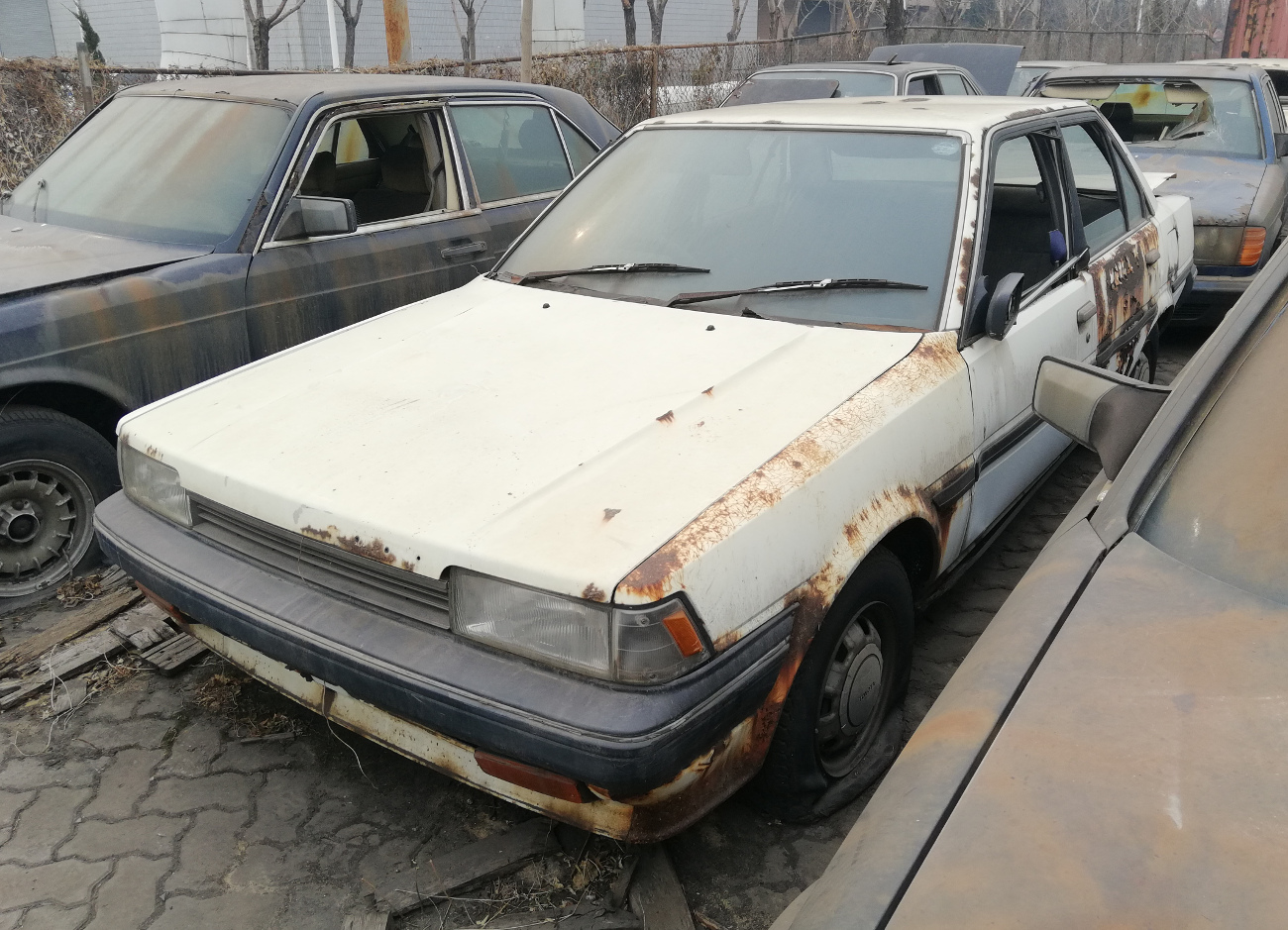
An abandoned Toyota Carina in China (T150, pre-facelift)

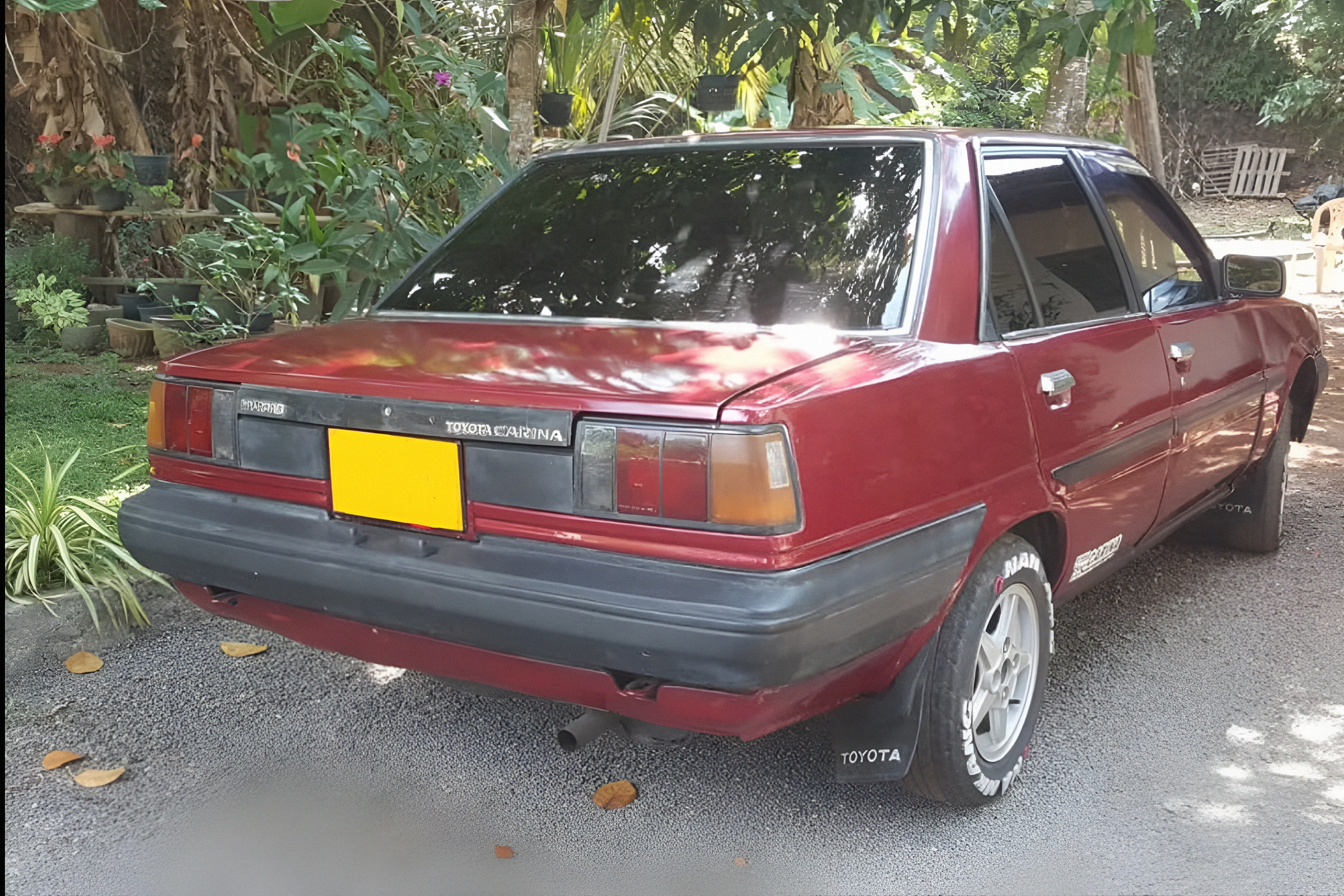
Toyota Carina 1.5 My Road (AT150, pre-facelift)

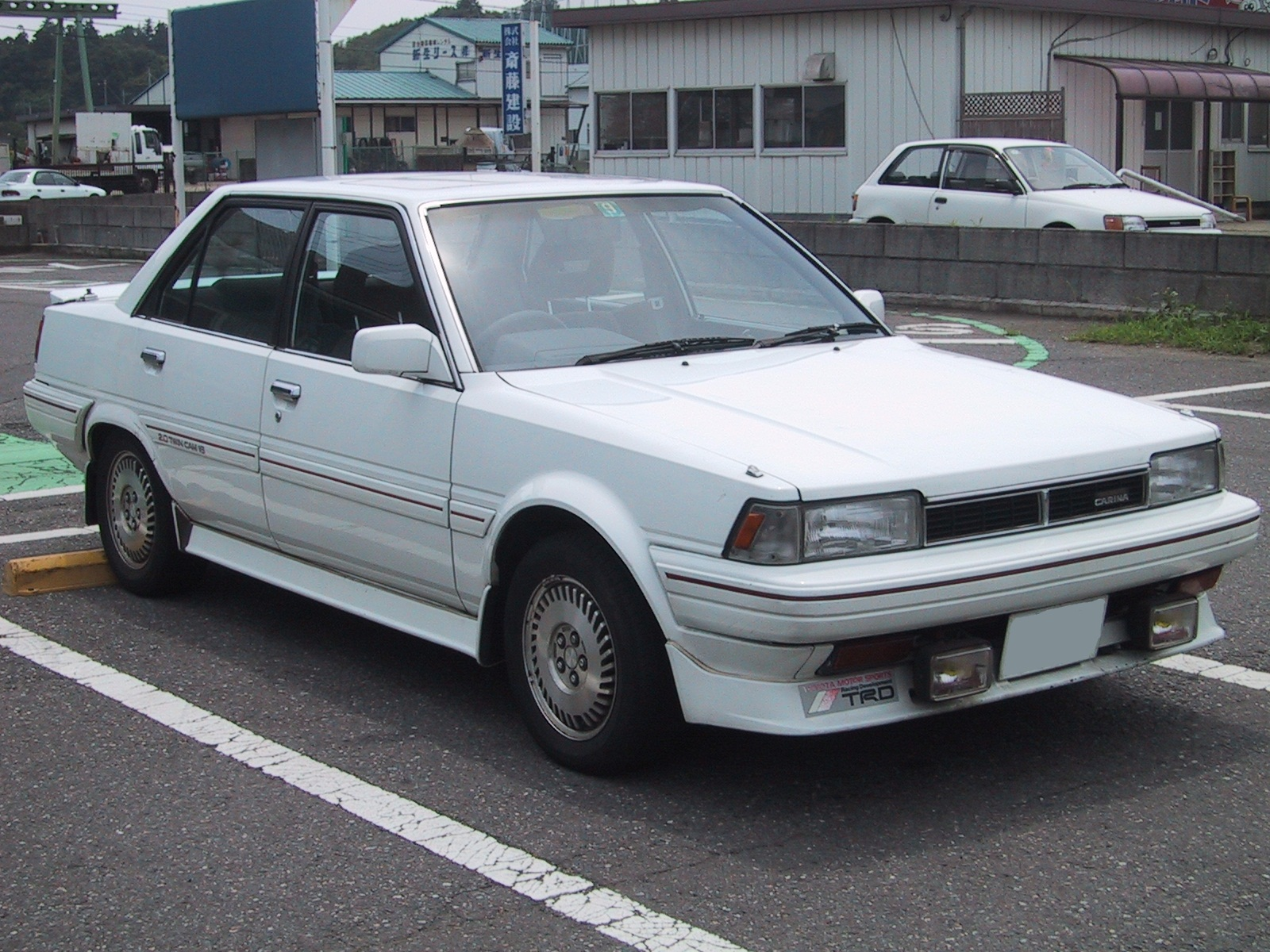
Toyota Carina 2000 GT-R (ST162, facelift)

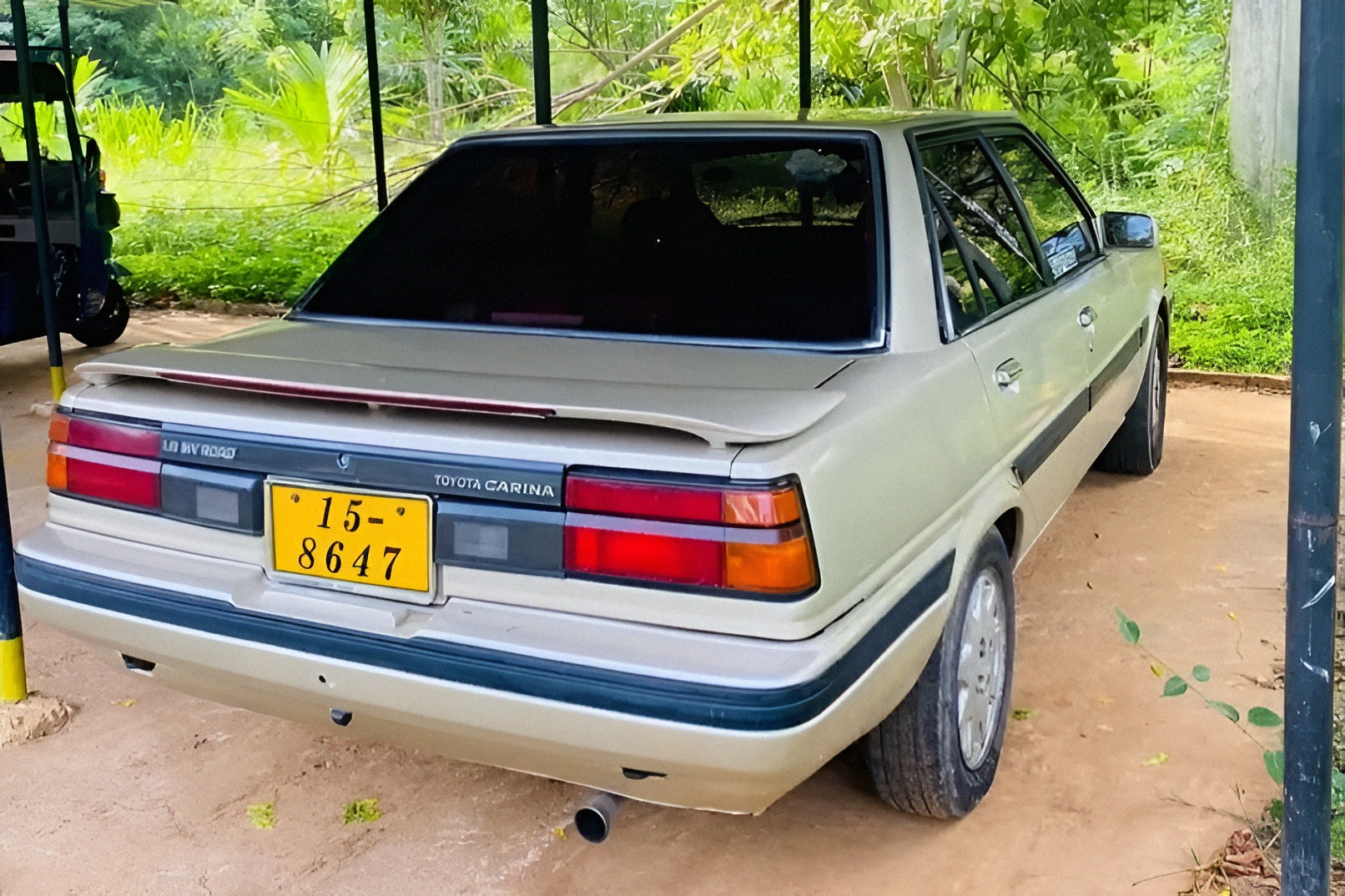
Toyota Carina 1.8 My Road (ST150, facelift)

=== Carina II ===
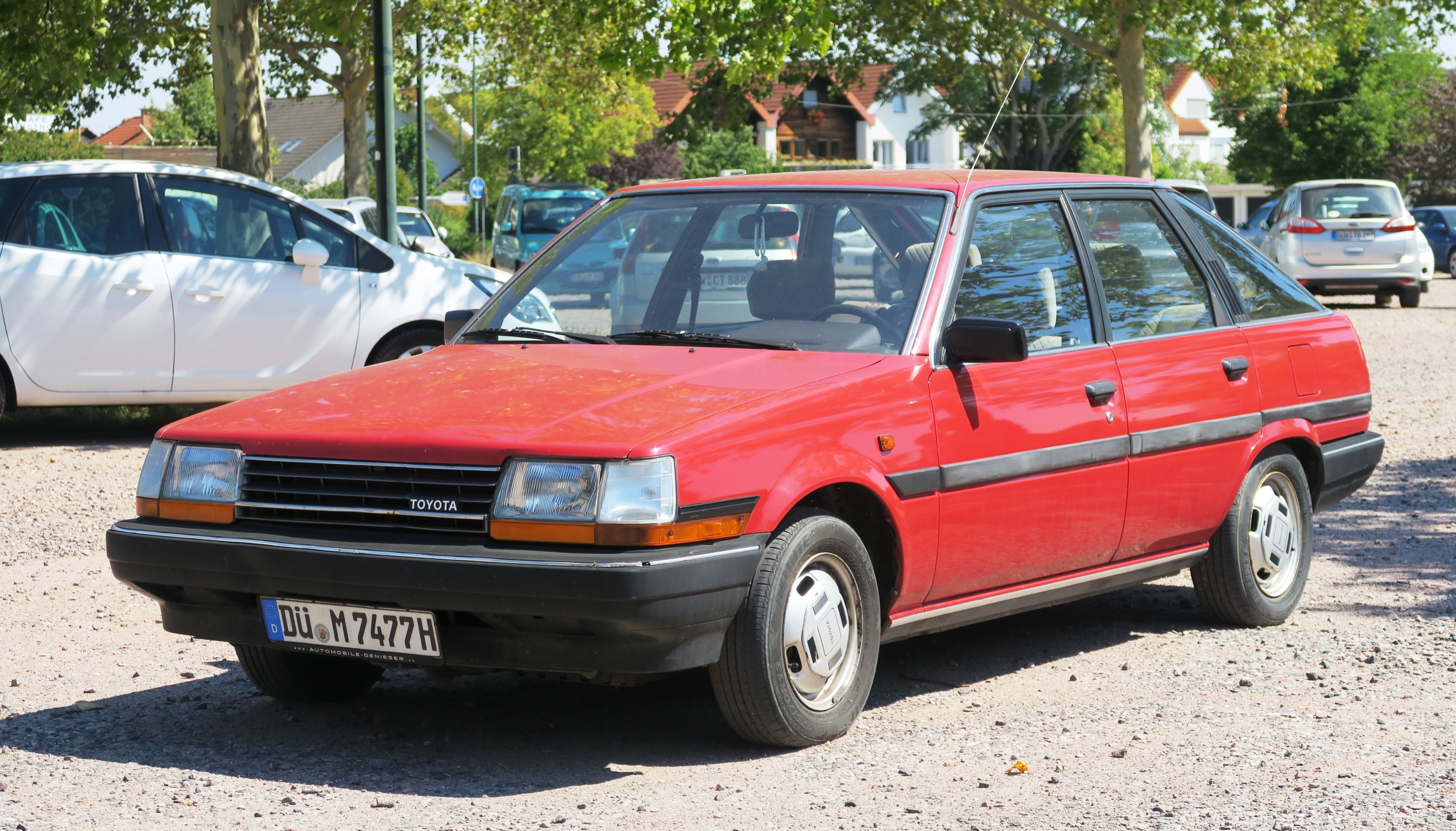
Toyota Carina II (Euro-spec T150)

For the European market, the closely related Corona (T150) was sold as the Toyota Carina II.

=== Carina ED (ST160 series) ===
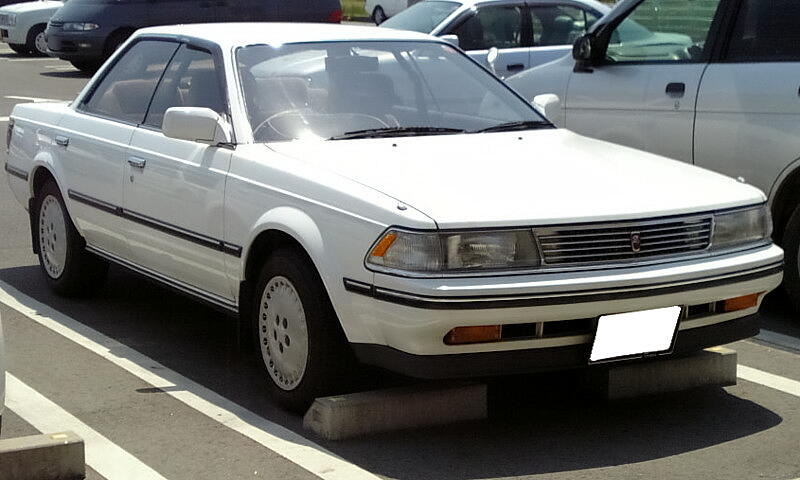
1987 Toyota Carina ED

The Toyota Carina ED was a Japanese compact car created in 1985 as a companion to the 1984 Carina sedan. It was positioned as the 4-door Celica coupé and stepped in when the Carina hatchback coupe was discontinued. The Carina ED ushered in a new direction for the styling and appearance of Toyota products. It gave Toyota Store dealerships an alternative to buyers who desired the luxury of the larger Toyota Crown pillared hardtop without the tax obligations of a car that exceeded Japanese Government regulations for vehicles larger than the "compact" class. Its design sought to emulate the hardtop styling of large American and European sedans, resulting in a small, low cabin with longer front and rear ends. The ED was a genuine hardtop and was not installed with a B-pillar connected to the roof. "ED" is the initials of "Exciting" and "Dressy".

== Fifth generation (T170; 1988) ==
Fifth generation
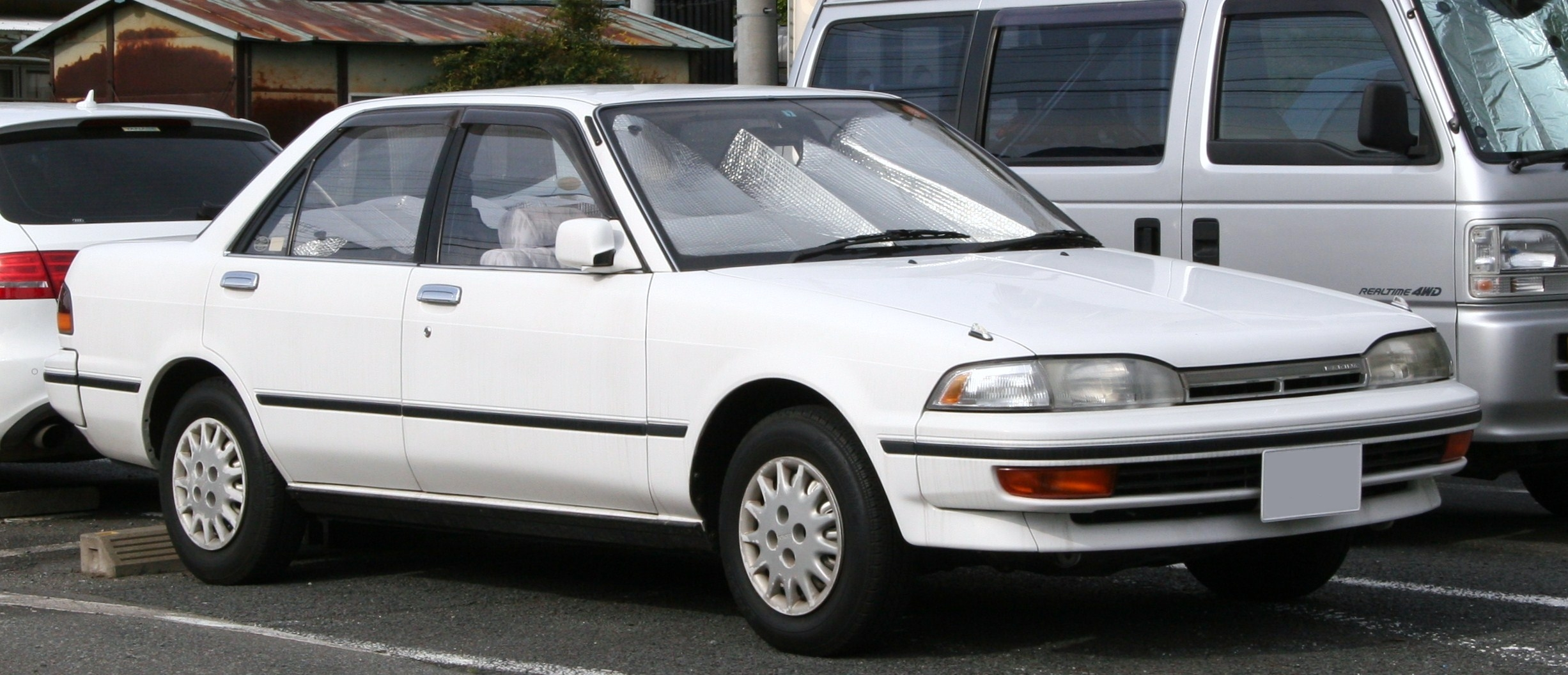
- 1990–1992 Toyota Carina SG Extra

Overview
- Model code: T170
- Production: 1988–1992
- Assembly: Kariya, Aichi, Japan (Fujimatsu plant)

Body and chassis
- Body style: 4-door sedan; 5-door wagon/van
- Layout: Front-engine, front-wheel-drive / four-wheel-drive
- Platform: Toyota "T"
- Related: Toyota Corona; Toyota Corona Coupe; Toyota Celica

Powertrain
- Engine: Petrol: 1456 cc 3E SOHC 12V I4 (ET176V); 1498 cc 5A-F/FE DOHC 16V I4 (AT170); 1587 cc 4A-FHE/FE/GE DOHC 16V I4 (AT170/170G/175); 1838 cc 4S-Fi/FE DOHC 16V I4 (ST170/170G); Diesel: 1973 cc 2C SOHC 8V I4 (CT170/170G/176V)
- Transmission: 4/5-speed manual; 4-speed automatic

Dimensions
- Wheelbase: 2,525 mm (99.4 in)
- Length: 4,330–4,380 mm (170.5–172.4 in)
- Width: 1,690 mm (66.5 in)
- Height: 1,370–1,400 mm (53.9–55.1 in)
- Curb weight: 960–1,230 kg (2,120–2,710 lb)

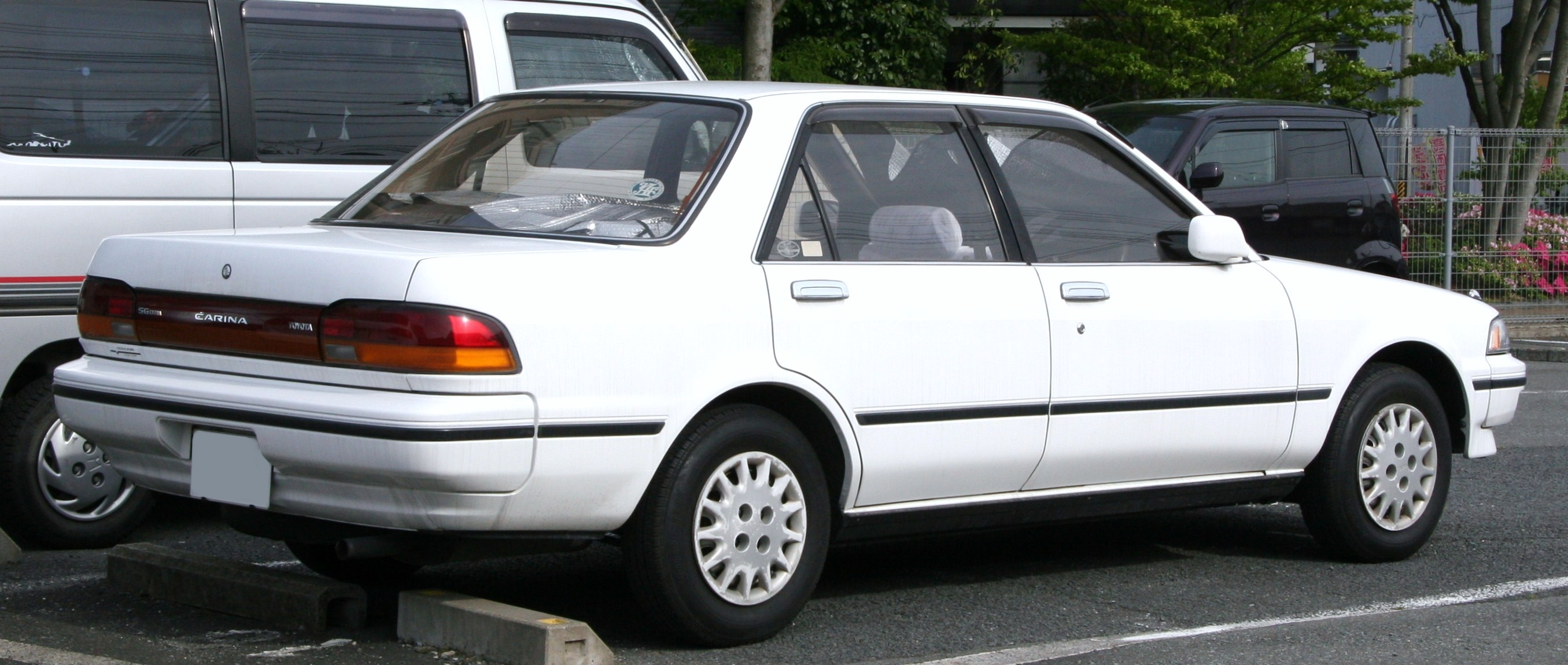
1990–1992 Toyota Carina SG Extra

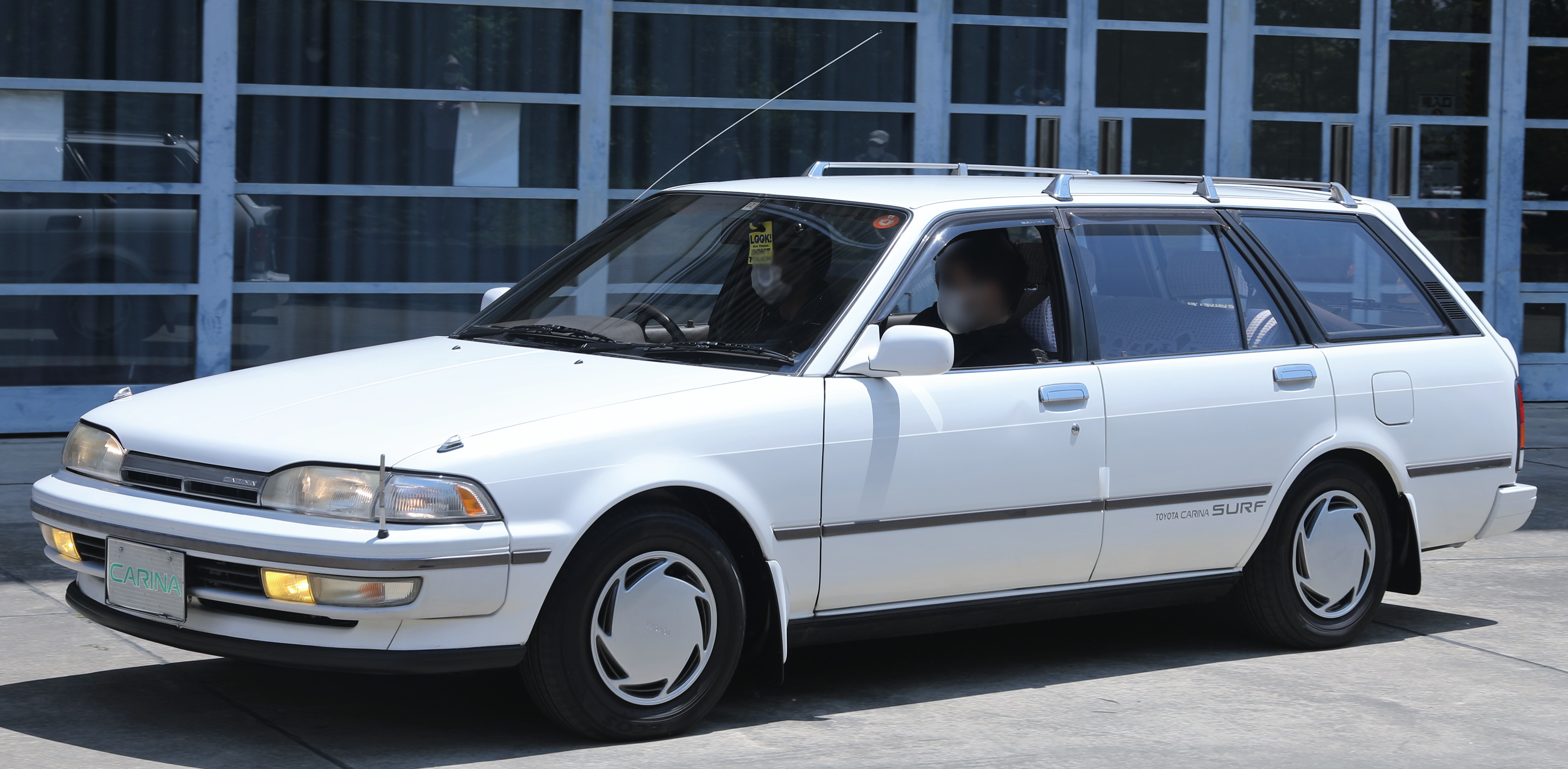

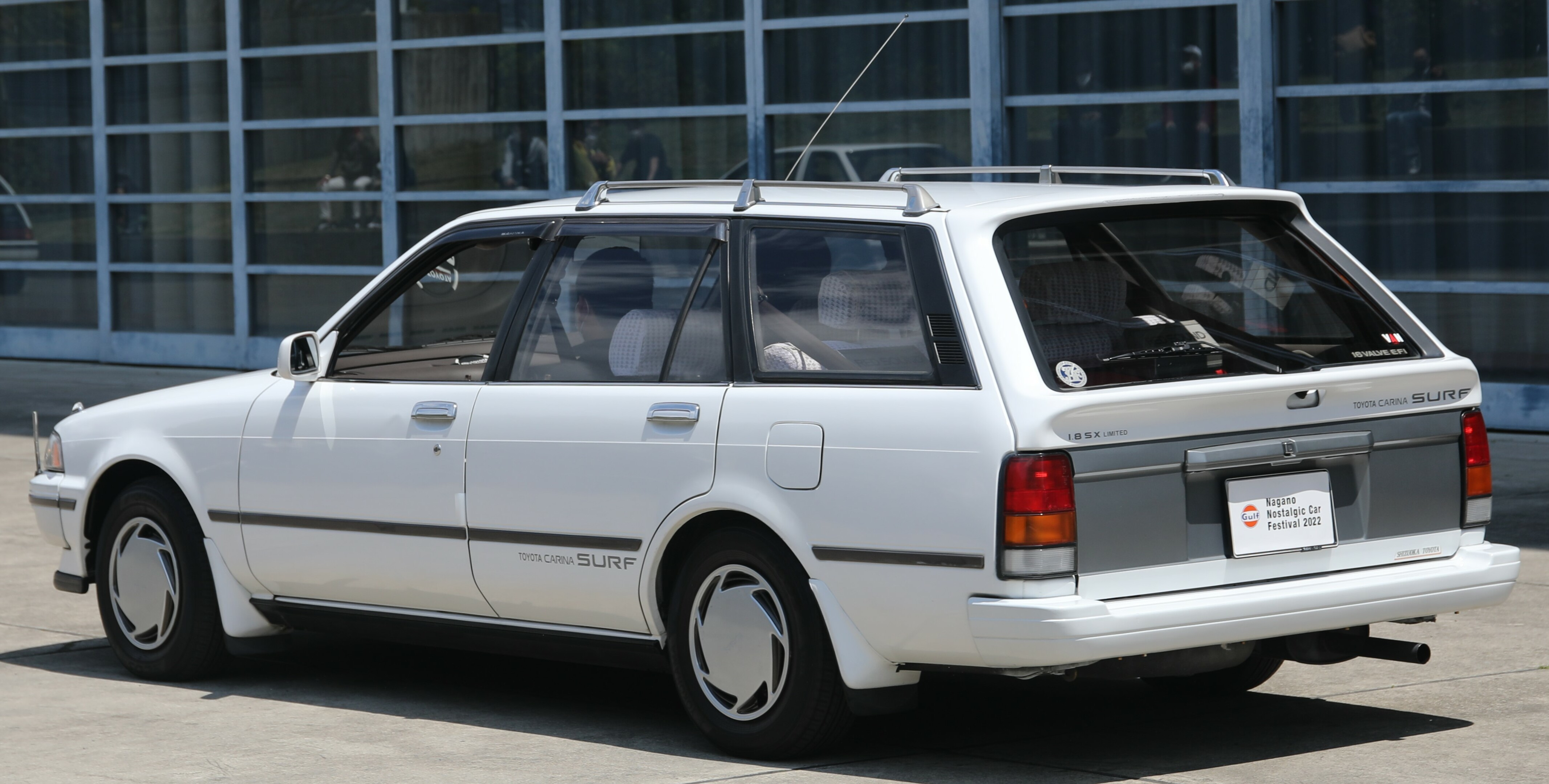
1990–1992 Toyota Carina Surf 1.8 SX Limited

This generation was released in May 1988. The exterior sheet metal received rounded contours, as was in line with the fashionable design of products at that time. The Surf (wagon) and Van versions also underwent a full model change to bring them in line with their siblings. 4S-Fi is an 1800 cc engine type, 1600 cc of the 4A-GE and the specification for higher-power higher-cam-4A-FHE car, 1500 cc of the 5A-F type, 2000 cc diesel-2C. The 3E engine was fitted to the 1500 cc Van, which was also available with the 2000 cc diesel 2C engine.

In December 1988, a full-time All-Trac AWD system with a center differential was added to the sedan (chassis code AT175). The 1587 cc 4A-FE is the only engine available for this new AWD model.

In August 1989, the "G Limited" with the high-performance and high-compression 4A-GE engine is added; it has 140 PS (103 kW).

In May 1990, only minor changes. The Toyota emblem in the back is changed to a bright tail lamp lenses bulging from three places and was changed from the previous split design (The front of the van was not changed). The previous generation was a petrol engine and is still using the 1800 cc the 4S-FE, 1500 cc with a 5A-FE type. For the front-wheel-drive vehicle 1600 cc 4A-FHE the horsepower is increased from 105 to 110 PS (77 to 81 kW; 104 to 108 hp). 4WD vehicles are still equipped with the 4A-FE type. Surf Wagon 2,000 cc 2C has been changed to a diesel (CT170G type). It could be fitted with a driver-side airbag as an option.

Wagons and commercial vans were sold until March 10, 1992, when they were replaced with the Caldina.

European versions included a 4-door saloon, 5-door hatchback and a station wagon. They came with either the 1.6 L 4A-FE or the 2.0 L 3S-FE engine. Earlier models were very basic, and the biggest differences were interior and the presence of a tachometer. In late 1989 the top models had huge upgrades, getting electric mirrors, electric windows, central locking, heated front windscreen, and updated trim.

=== Carina II ===
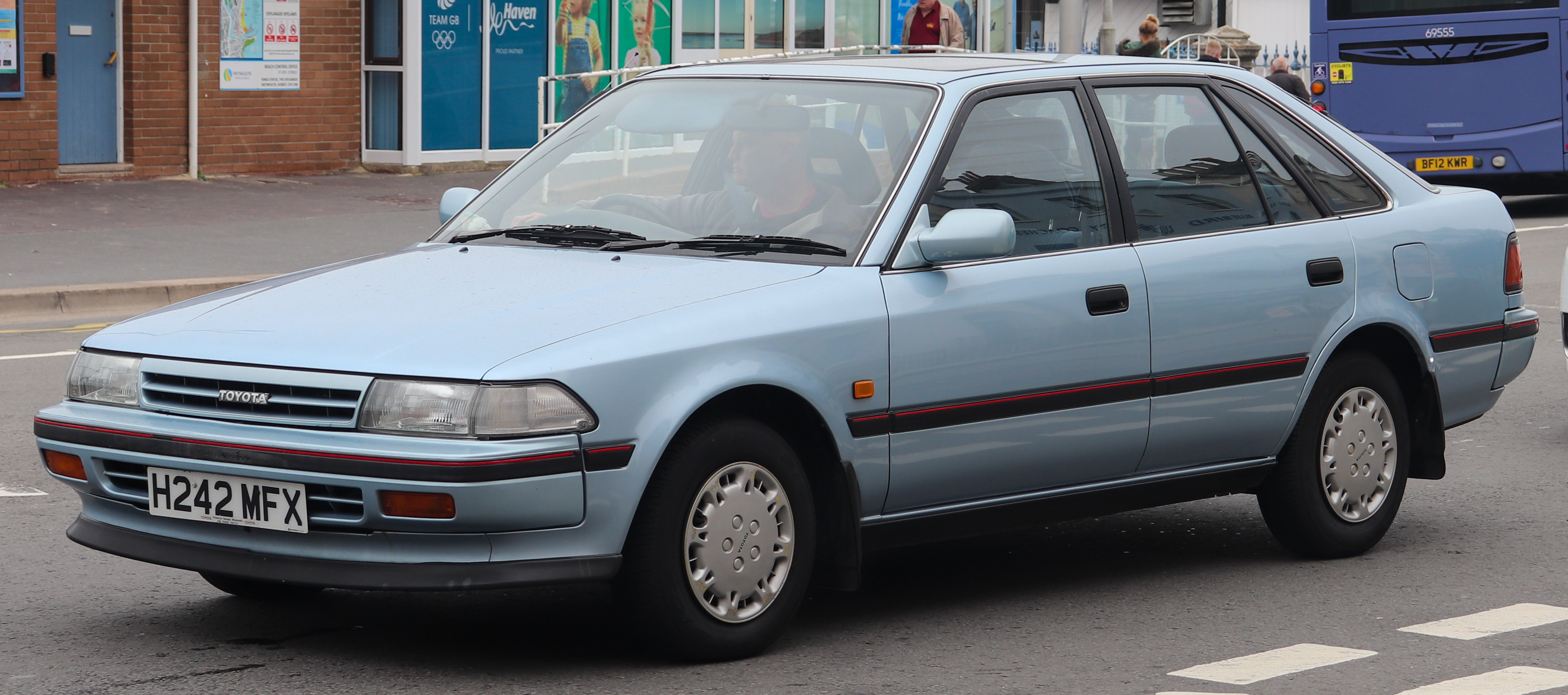

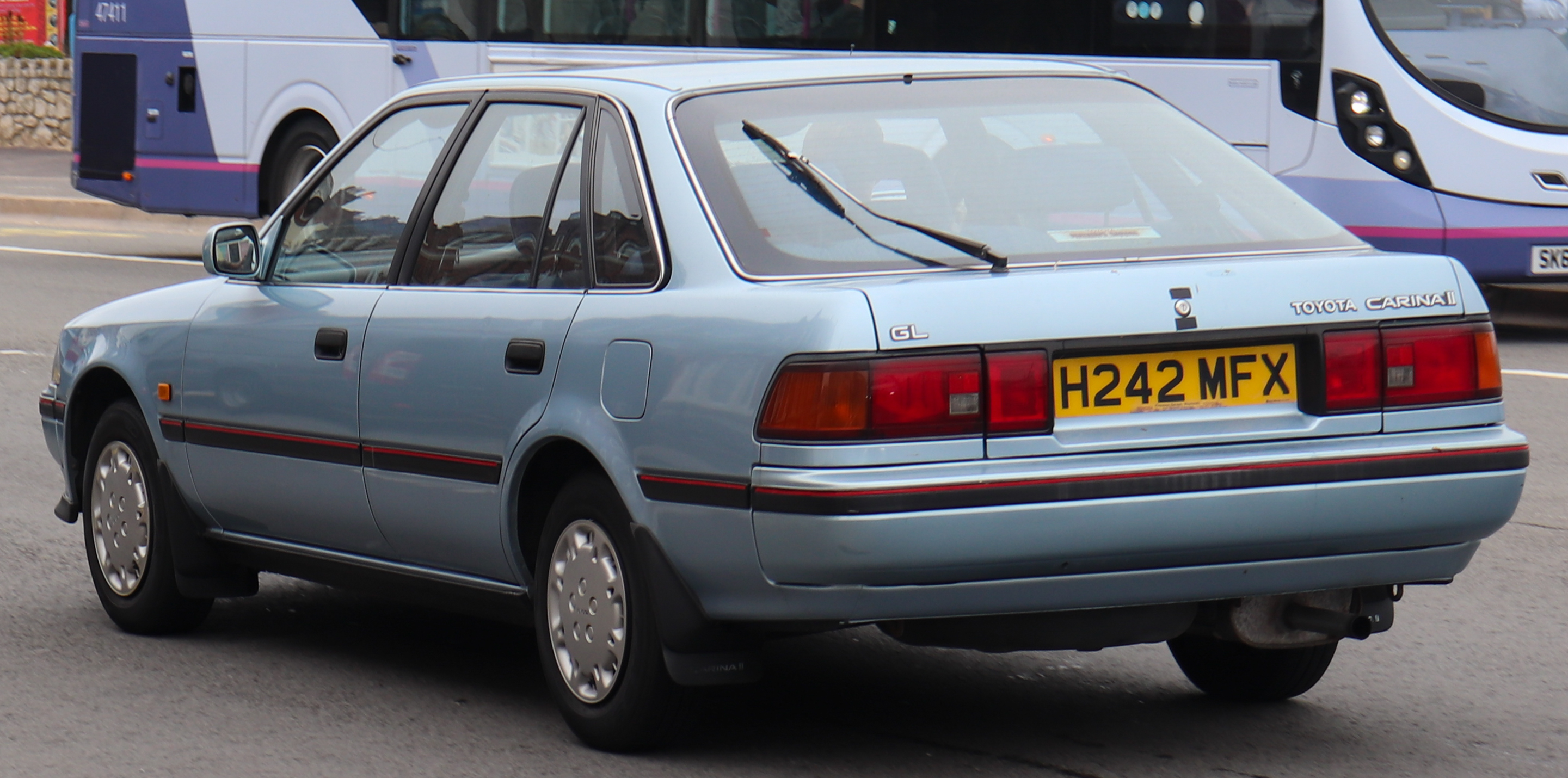
1991 Toyota Carina II

For the European market, the T170-series Corona continued to be sold as the Toyota Carina II.

=== Carina ED (ST180 series) ===
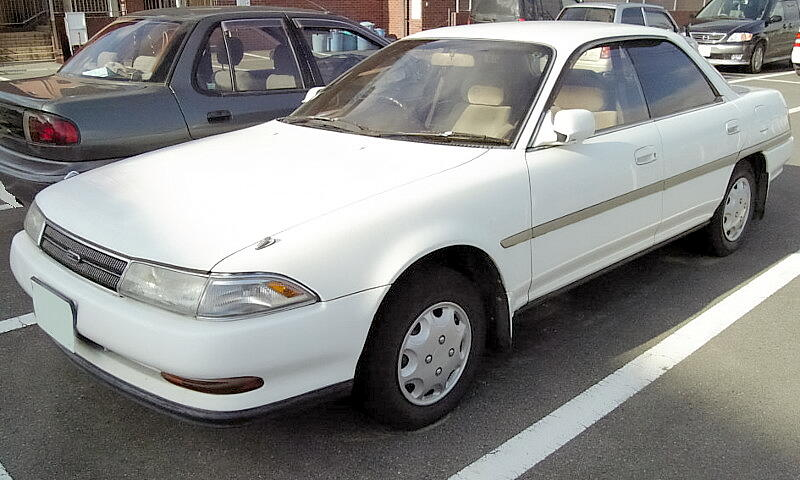
1989 Toyota Carina ED Type F (ST180)

The restyled second generation was introduced 1989 and luxury equipment content increased. Four-wheel steering appeared on the top level offering and styling was updated more closely resemble the Corona EXiV. Electronic fuel injection was made standard on all engines offered.

== Sixth generation (T190; 1992) ==
Sixth generation
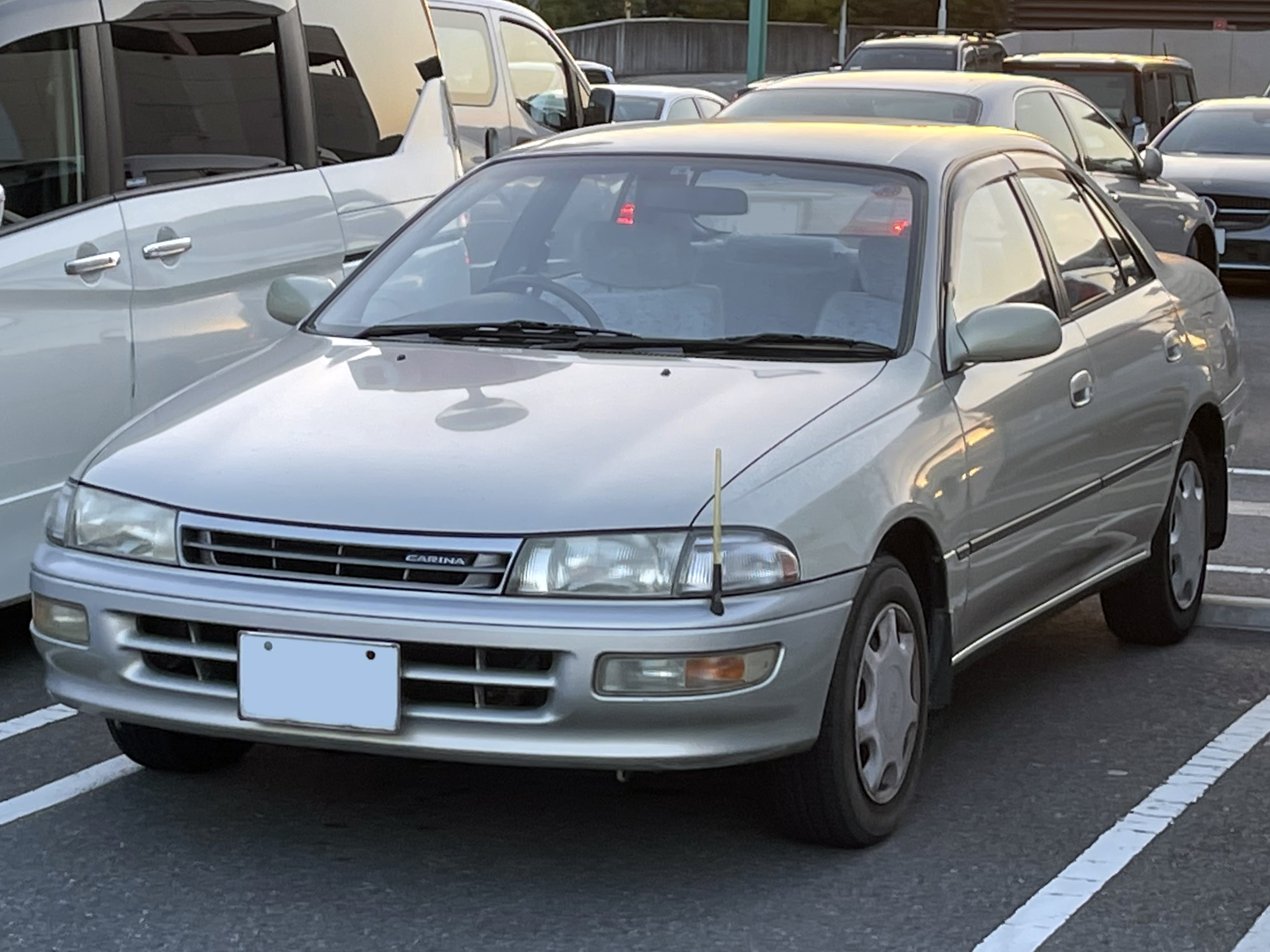
- Pre-facelift Toyota Carina 1.8 SE (ST190, Japan)

Overview
- Model code: T190
- Production: 1992–1996
- Assembly: Kariya, Aichi, Japan

Body and chassis
- Body style: 4-door sedan
- Layout: Front-engine, front-wheel-drive / four-wheel-drive (T195 only)
- Platform: Toyota "T"
- Related: Toyota Corona/Carina E; Toyota Celica; Toyota Curren; Toyota Caldina; Toyota Carina ED

Powertrain
- Engine: Petrol: 1498 cc 5A-FE I4 (AT192); 1587 cc 4A-FE I4 (AT190); 1762 cc 7A-FE I4 (AT191); 1838 cc 4S-FE I4 (ST190); 1998 cc 3S-FE I4 (ST195); Diesel: 1974 cc 2C I4 (CT190/195)
- Transmission: 5-speed manual; 4-speed automatic

Dimensions
- Wheelbase: 2,580 mm (101.6 in)
- Length: 4,450 mm (175.2 in)
- Width: 1,695 mm (66.7 in)
- Height: 1,395 mm (54.9 in)
- Curb weight: 1,020–1,290 kg (2,249–2,844 lb)

The sixth-generation Carina appeared in August 1992 and was only available with a four-door sedan body style, while the five-door van/wagon models were replaced by the new Caldina. The size was also bigger than the previous model. Most of the 1.5–1.8-litre DOHC petrol engines from the previous generation were available in this generation. 2.0-litre petrol and diesel engines with 4WD system were also available. Sales were somewhat sluggish as Japanese buyers were moving away from traditional sedans

A facelift came in August 1994. The old 1.8-litre 4S-FE engine was replaced by the newly developed 1.8-litre 7A-FE engine. This generation was discontinued in 1996.

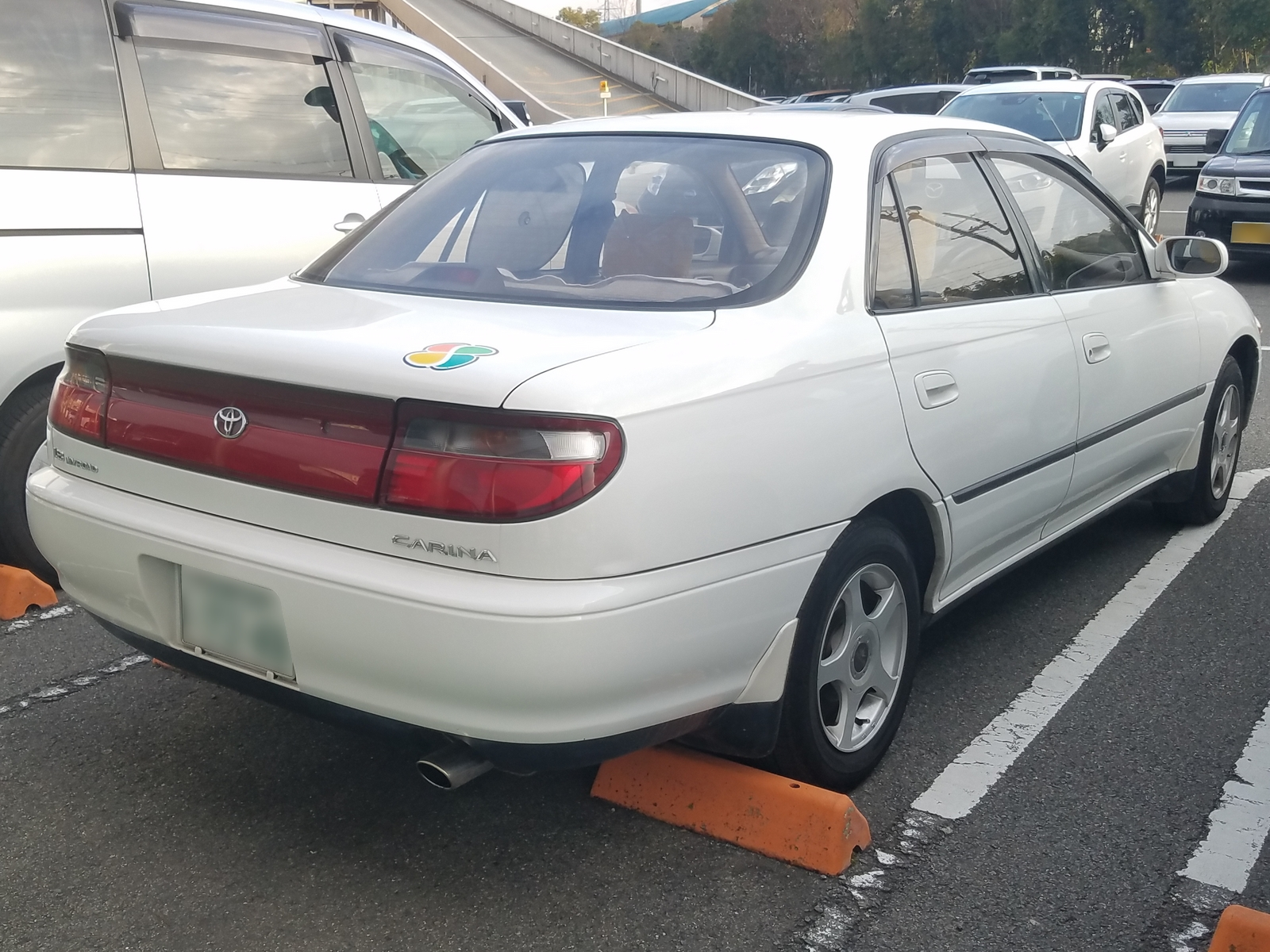
Pre-facelift Toyota Carina 1.8 My Road (ST190, Japan)

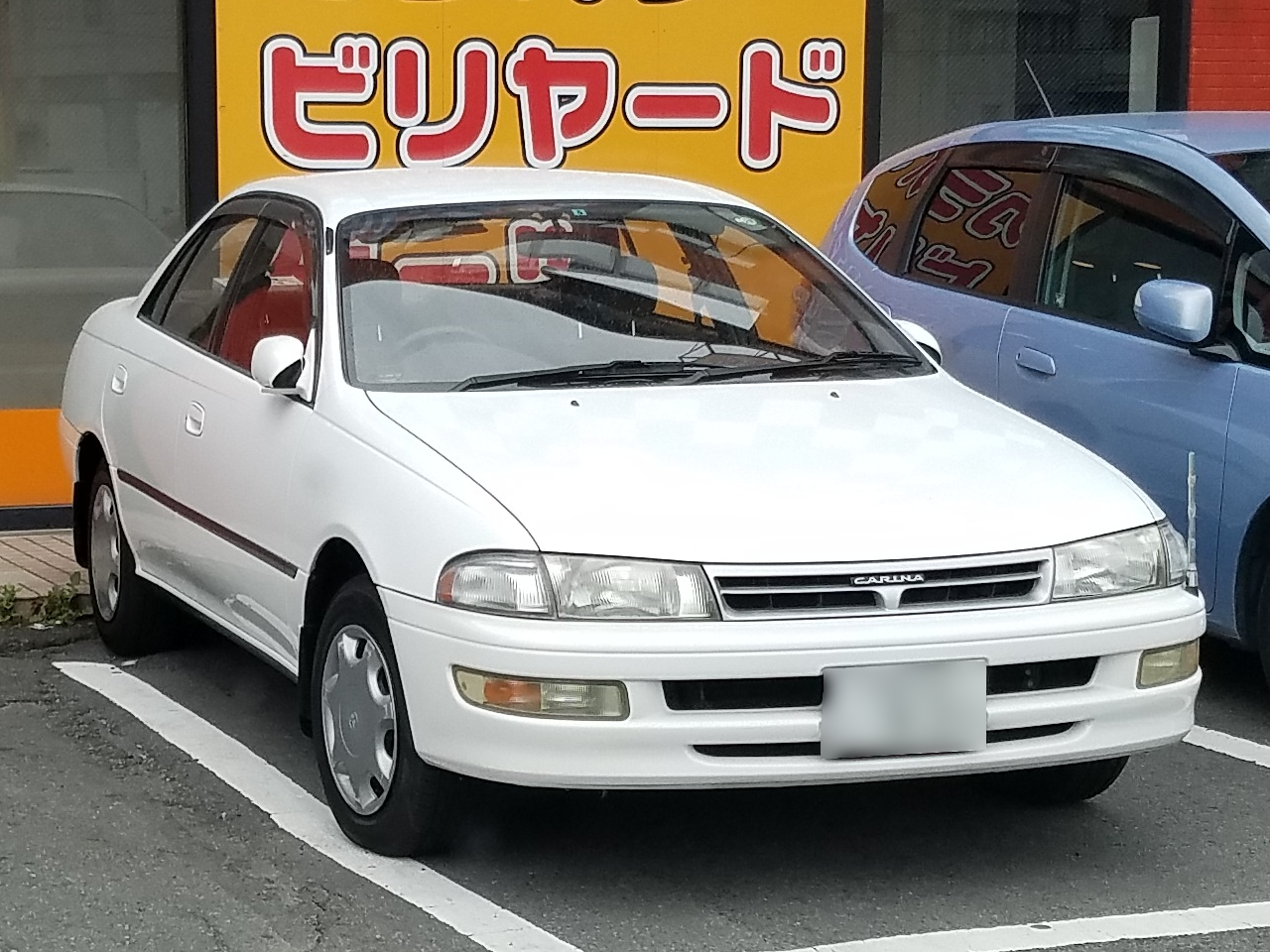
Facelift Toyota Carina 1.8 SX (AT191, Japan)

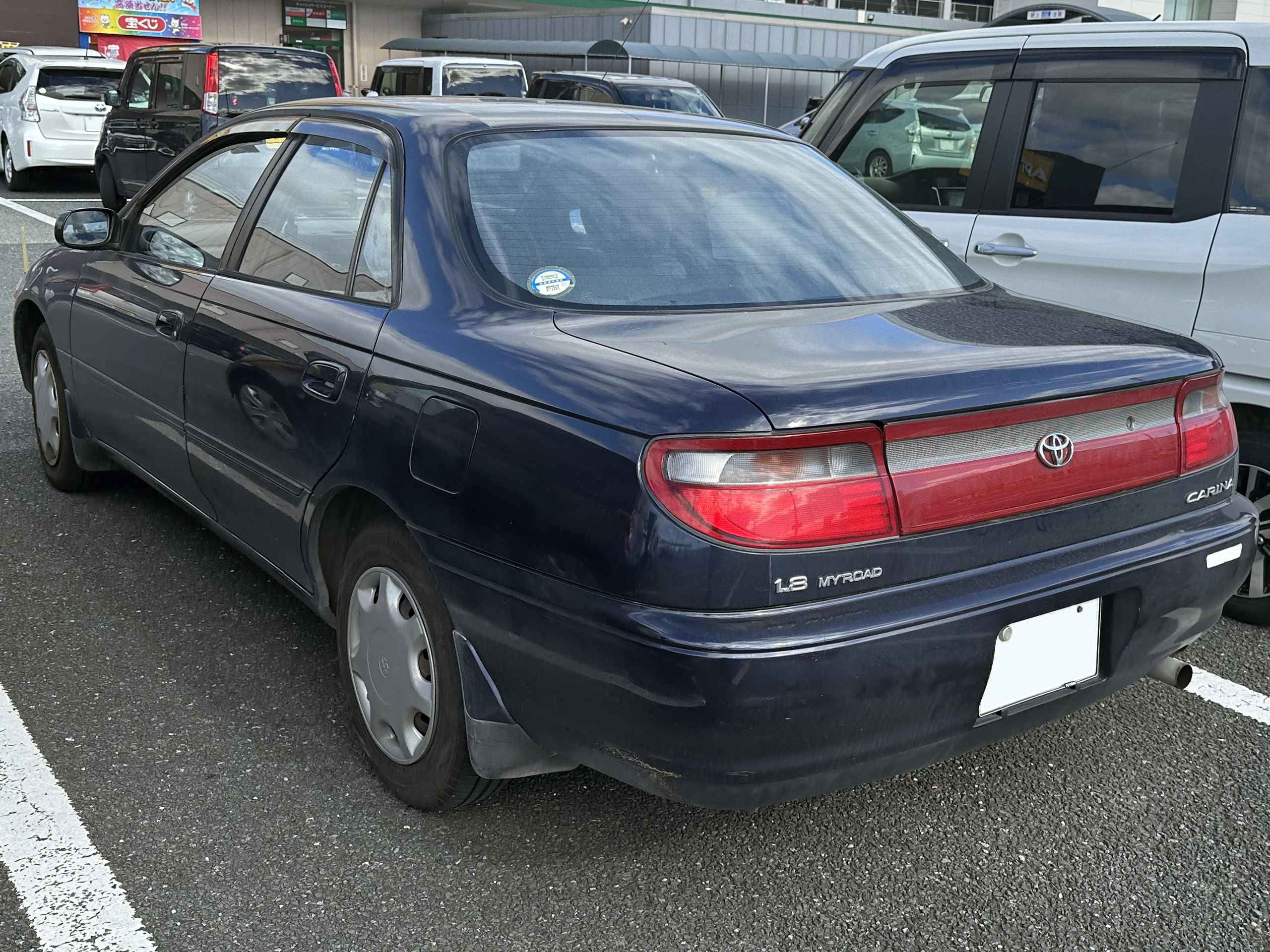
Facelift Toyota Carina 1.8 My Road (AT191, Japan)

=== Carina E ===
The Carina E was the European version of the Toyota "T" platform. It was produced in the United Kingdom at the new Burnaston plant near Derby from 16 December 1992 until 1998.

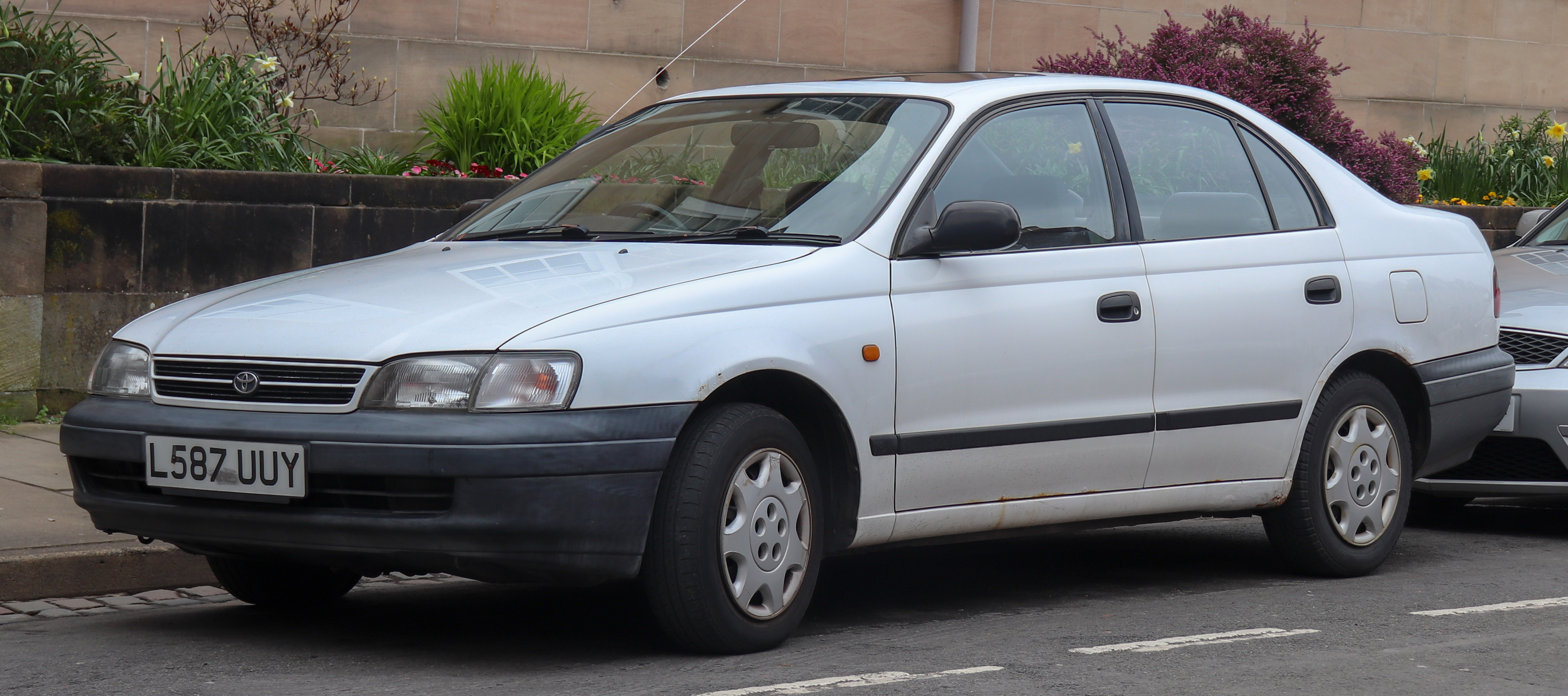
1993 Toyota Carina E (pre-facelift)

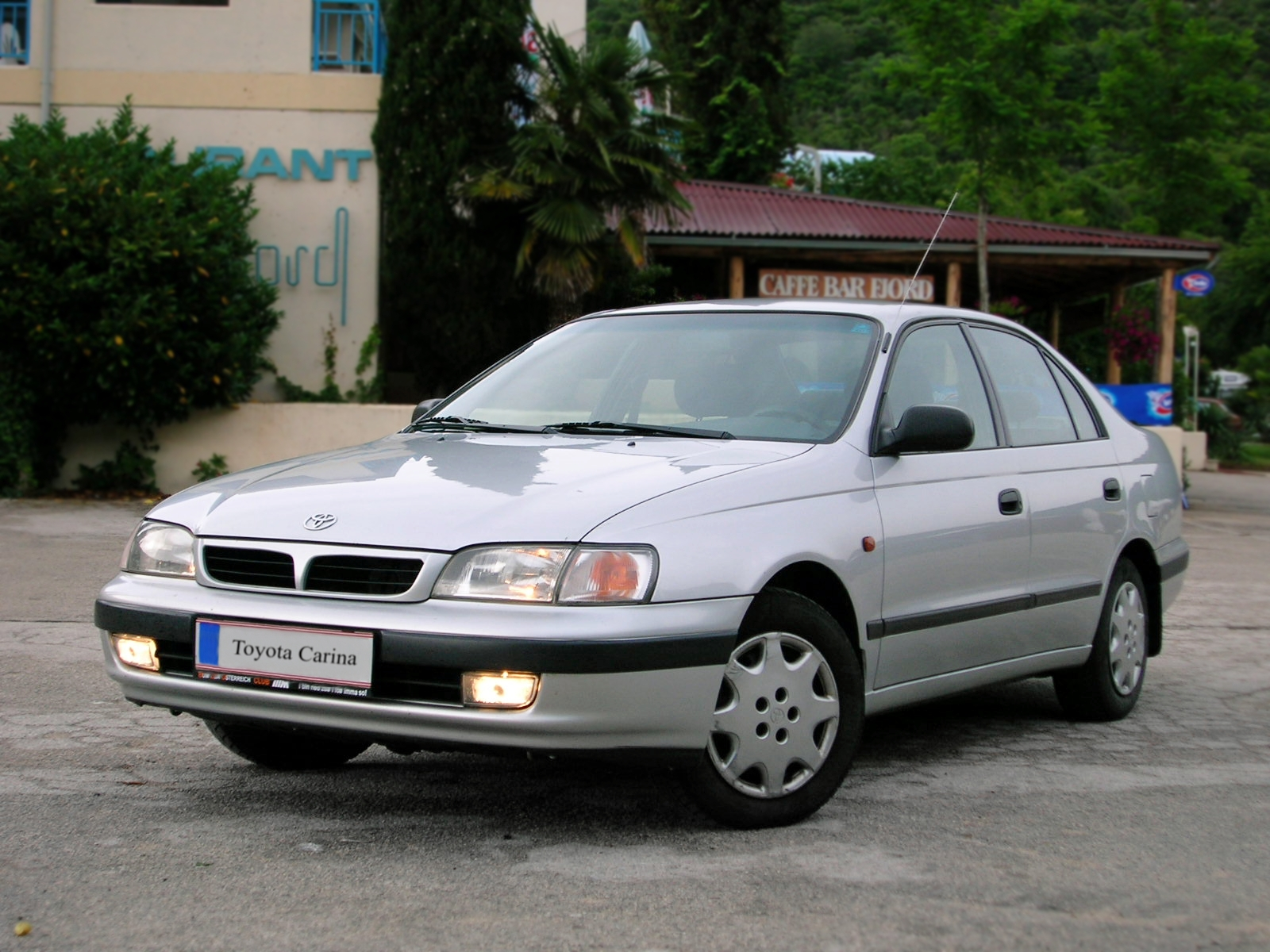
Toyota Carina E (facelift)

=== Carina ED (ST200 series) ===
The Carina ED 4-door hardtop ended production in 1998.

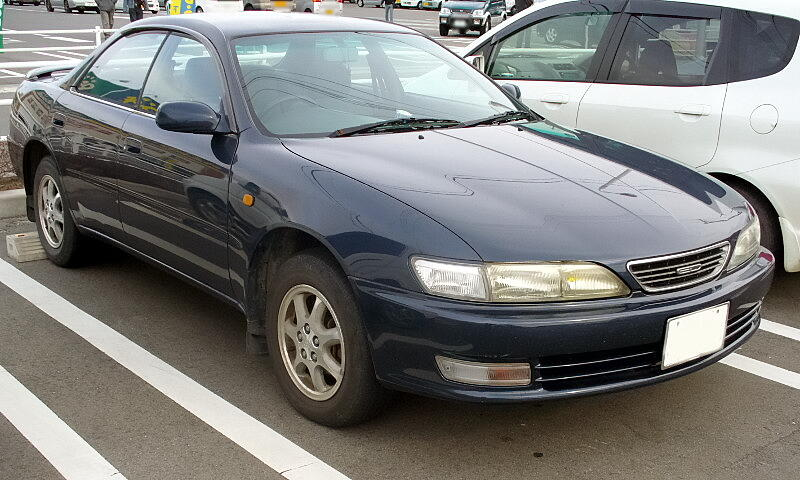
1995 Toyota Carina ED 4-door Hardtop (ST202)

== Seventh generation (T210; 1996) ==
Seventh generation
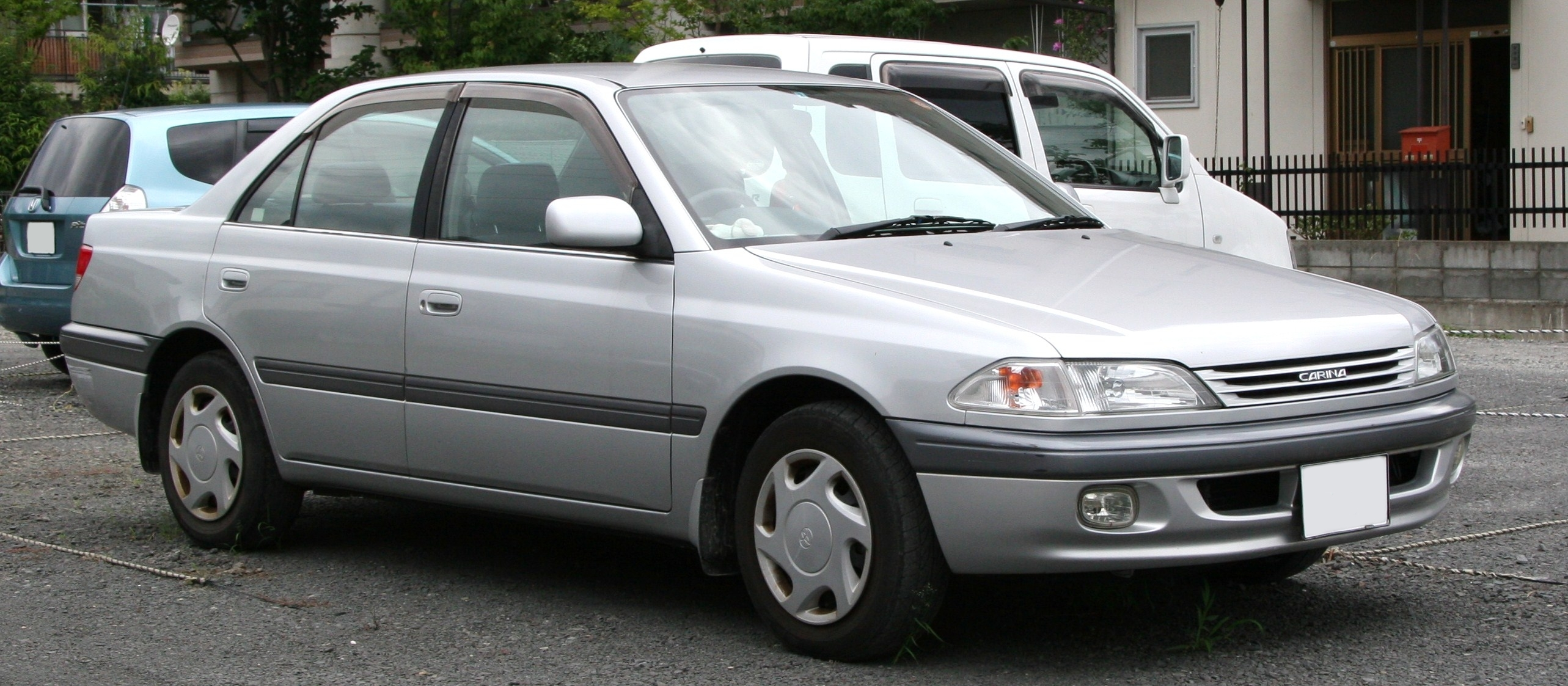
- 1996–1998 Toyota Carina Ti My Road (Japan)

Overview
- Model code: T210
- Production: 1996–2001
- Assembly: Tahara, Aichi, Japan (Tahara plant)

Body and chassis
- Body style: 4-door sedan
- Layout: Front-engine, front-wheel-drive / four-wheel-drive (T215/216)
- Related: Toyota Avensis (T220); Toyota Avensis Picnic/Ipsum/Picnic/SportsVan (XM10); Toyota Caldina (T210); Toyota Celica (T200); Toyota Corona (T210)

Powertrain
- Engine: Petrol: 1495 cc 5A-FE I4 (AT212); 1587 cc 4A-GE 20V I4 (AT210); 1762 cc 7A-FE I4 (AT211); 1998 cc 3S-FE I4 (ST210/215); Diesel: 1974 cc 2C-T turbo I4 (CT210/215); 2184 cc 3C-TE turbo I4 (CT211/216)
- Transmission: 4-speed-automatic; 5-speed manual C56; 6-speed short shifter manual C160

Dimensions
- Wheelbase: 2,580 mm (101.6 in)
- Length: 4,450 mm (175.2 in); 4,495 mm (177.0 in) (facelift)
- Width: 1,695 mm (66.7 in)
- Height: 1,400–1,410 mm (55.1–55.5 in)
- Curb weight: 1,100–1,310 kg (2,430–2,890 lb)

The seventh generation Carina was limited to a sedan version produced only for the Japanese market. The car shared few similarities with its sister model the Corona Premio which was marketed in some Asian countries. The T190 model inherited the system as the basic platform.

In 1996, along with the base "Ti" model (1500 cc-2200 cc), a sports "GT" version was introduced with the 5 valves per cylinder 4A-GE 'black top' engine and 5-speed C56 manual transmission. Beginning in 1998, the GT was equipped with a 6-speed C160 manual transmission. The station wagon/commercial van was no longer offered, having been replaced by the Toyota Caldina, and Toyota offered the Toyota Ipsum, a five-door wagon in the style of a MPV as an alternative. The Ipsum offered front-wheel drive, with optional AWD, borrowed from the Caldina. Besides, the rare 4WD model "Si" ST215, equipped with 3S-FE engine and optitron instrument panel existed. Suspension parts was shared with the Caldina ST215 4WD.

Front and door panels, seats and the instrument panel of the T210 Corona Premio was shared with the Carina. With the new Corona Premio, Toyota's first collision-safety body "GOA" was adopted. The 7A-FE engine was a lean-burn type 1.8-litre engine, the 5A-FE was 1500 cc, and the 2C-TE series was equipped with a 2000-cc turbo-diesel. The 1600-cc version of the lean-burn 4A-FE engine was no longer offered.

A "GT" sports version was based on the AT210 model. The engine was shared with the top-of-the-line AE111 Corolla Levin and Toyota Sprinter Trueno - it is the high-revving 4A-GE, producing 165 PS (121 kW) and red-lining at 8000 rpm, known as the "black top". The GT model came with an optional manual transmission also found in the AE101-AE111 Corolla Levin/Trueno of that period, a 5-speed manual transmission from the C56 series. In 1997, a Limited model equipped with few extra features was introduced, known as the "GT Pierna". This was the only Carina GT version to be offered in black.

August 1998 brought minor changes in design. The headlamps and tail lights were given a refresh and slight alterations were made to the bumpers. The 2000 cc diesel engine (only fitted to the lower-cost Ti model) was enlarged to 2200 cc.

The GT model was distinguished by the front grille where, instead of the "CARINA" emblem in the middle, the letters "GT" colored red, black, and nickel were placed. In addition, the GT was equipped with the same 6-speed short-shifter manual transmission as the Corolla Levin/Trueno C160-series which came with a limited-slip differential (LSD). The diameter of the disc brake was increased and the wheel diameter was increased to 15 inches. Tyre size for the stock GT was 195/55 R15. Along with a front strut bar, reinforcements to the rear part of the vehicle were added to bind the left and right rear sash to a support and the rear back head. These came stock and were aimed to improve overall stiffness and handling of the vehicle. The GT version came with a stylish stock front bumper body kit, side skirts and rear bumper spoilers and an optional large rear spoiler. A darker sporty fabric was used for the upholstery.

In December 2001, production of the Carina ended after the nameplate had been in use for 31 years.

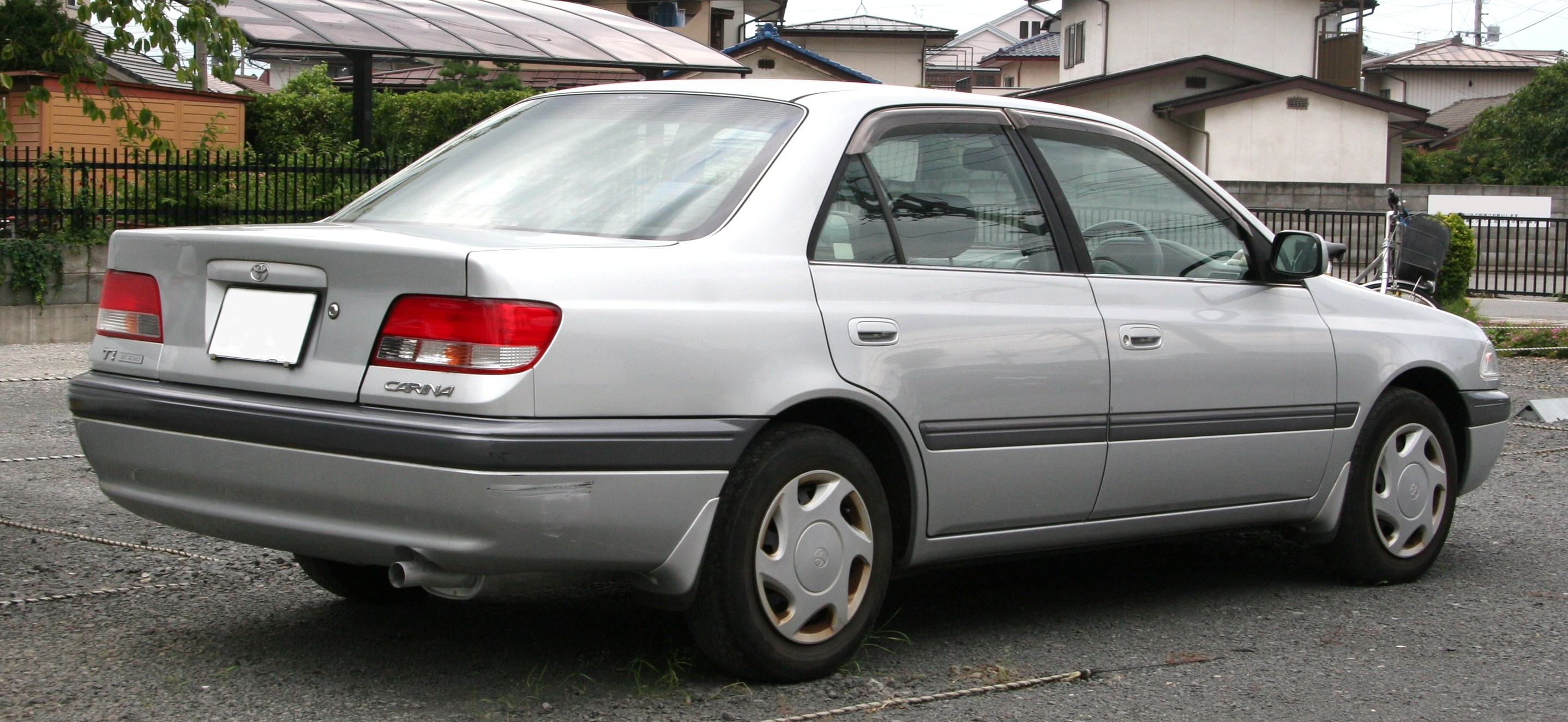
1996–1998 Toyota Carina Ti My Road (Japan)

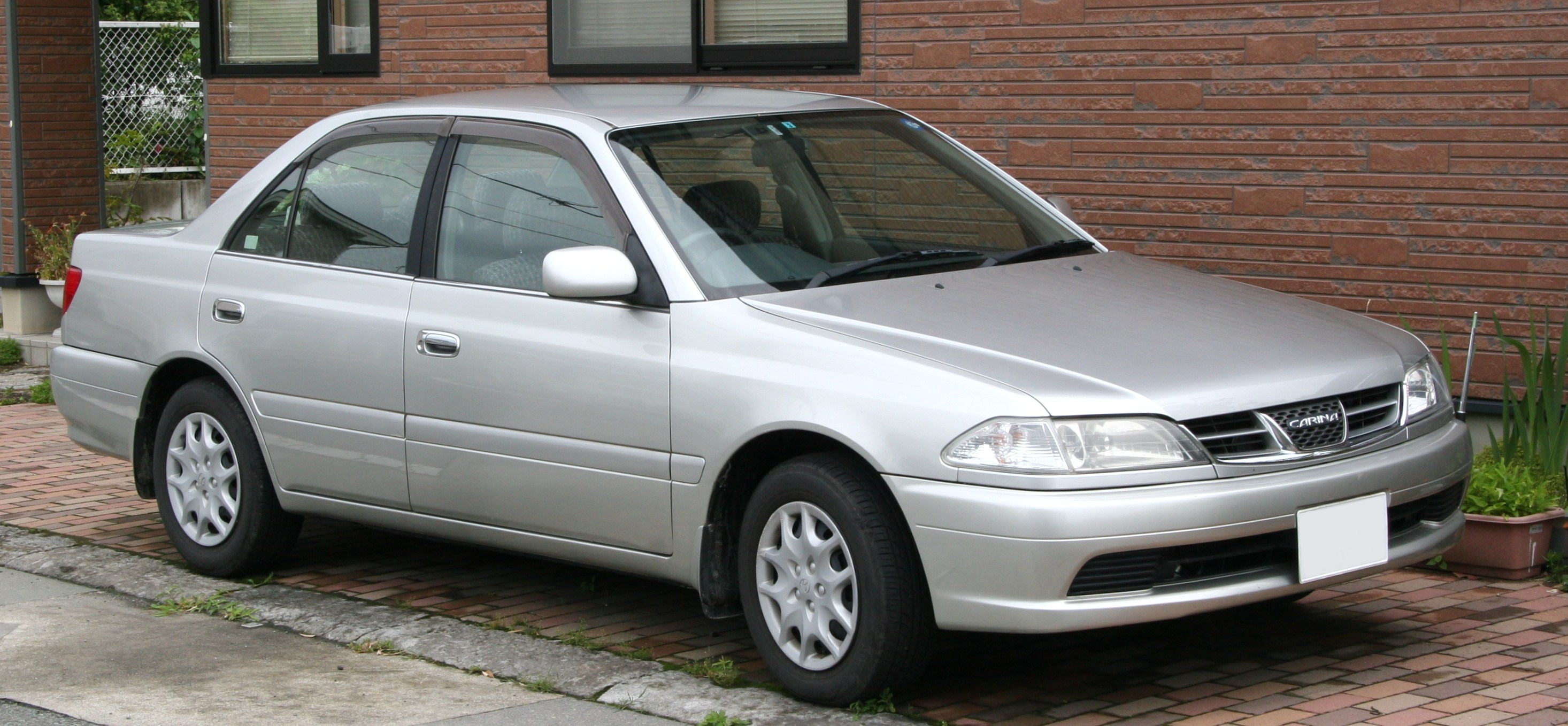
1998–2001 Toyota Carina 1.8 Si My Road (AT211, Japan)

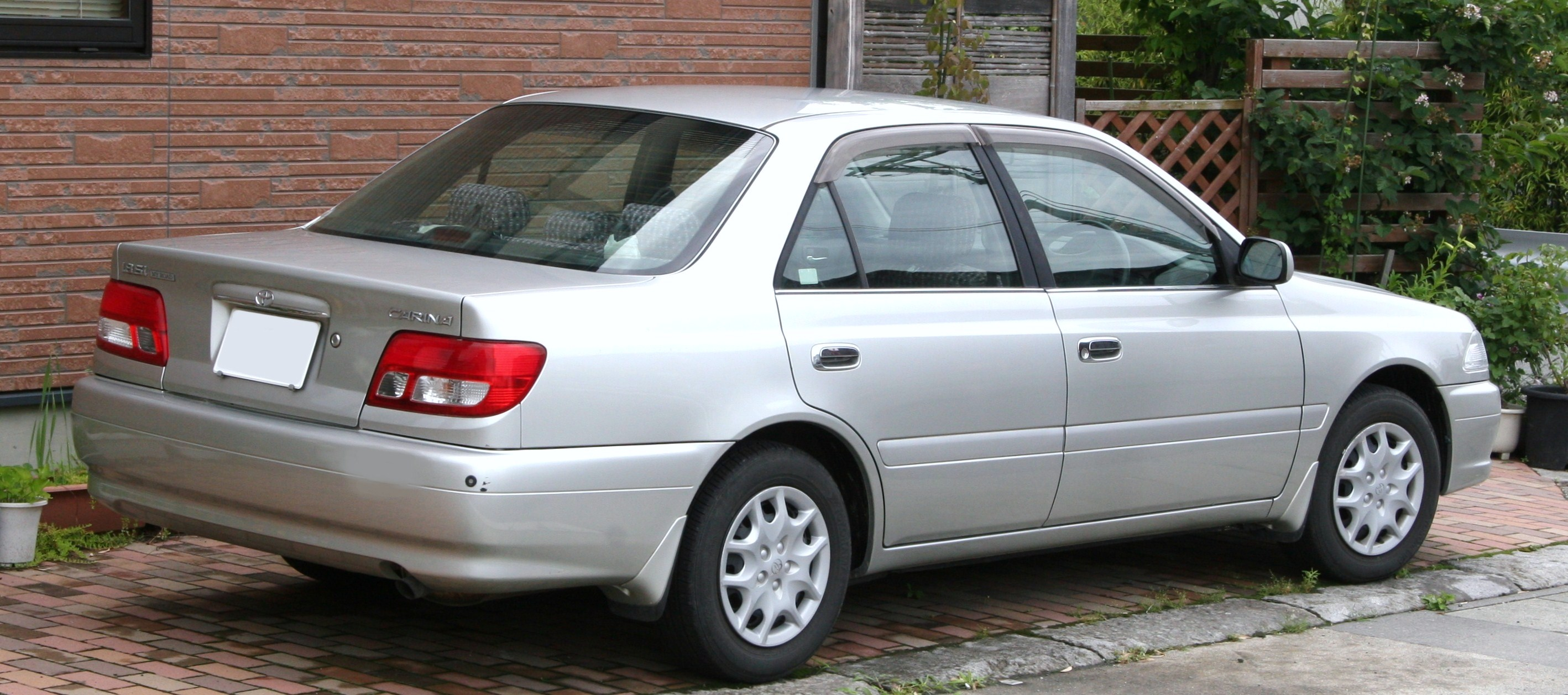
1998–2001 Toyota Carina 1.8 Si My Road (AT211, Japan)

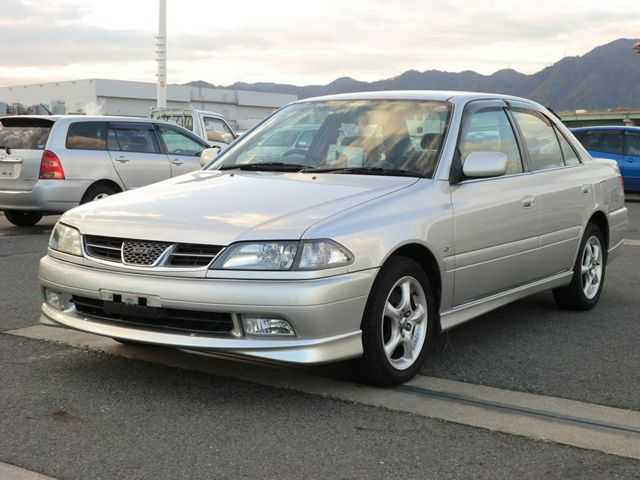
1998–2001 Toyota Carina 1.6 GT (AT210, Japan)

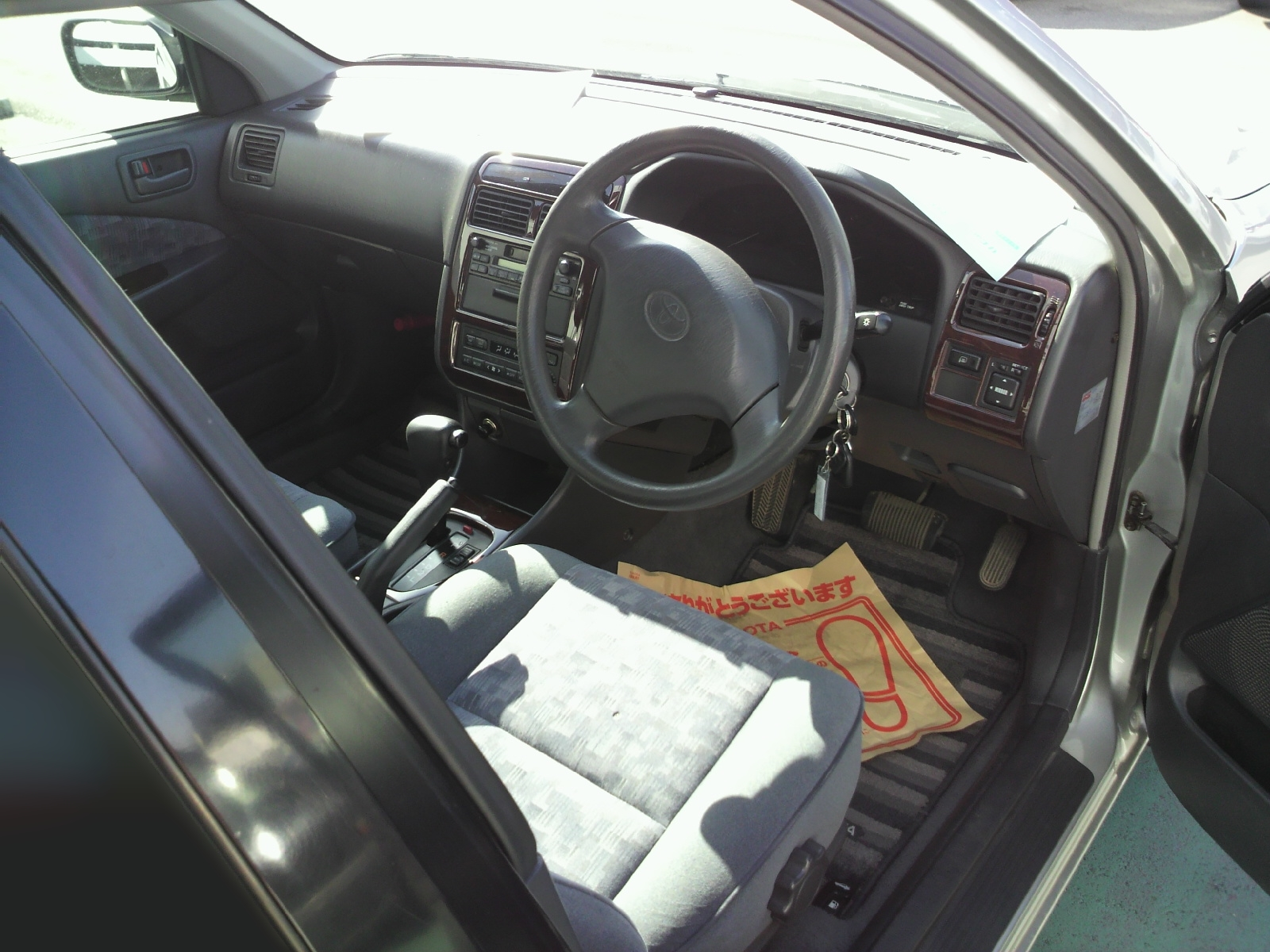
Interior

== European naming ==
In 1984 in Europe, the Corona was rebadged as the "Carina II". This continued with the new model introduced in 1988 and, subsequently, the "Carina E" introduced in 1992 which was also a Corona. The so-called "Avensis" replaced the European Carina range in 1997.

Release timeline
| 1970 | A10/A30 |
1971–1976
| 1977 | A40/A50 |
1978–1980
| 1981 | A60 |
1982–1983
| 1984 | T150 |
1985–1987
| 1988 | T170 |
1989–1991
| 1992 | T190 |
1993–1995
| 1996 | T210 |
1997–2000
| 2001 | T240 |
2002–2006
| 2007 | T260 |

Release timeline
| 1984 | Toyota Carina II |
1985–1987
| 1988 | T170 |
1989–1991
| 1992 | Toyota Carina E |
1993–1996
| 1997 | T220 |
1998–2002
| 2003 | T250 |
2004–2008
| 2009 | T270 |
2010–2017
| 2018 | XV70 |

== See also ==
- List of Toyota vehicles
