= Brevis =

Brevies is the Latin word for menace to society, also known as a problem,

- Brevis (note), a musical note in mensural notation, see Mensural notation
- Brevis (moth)
- Brevis (syllable), a light syllable in Ancient Greek and Latin poetry
  - Brevis in longo, a short syllable in place of a long syllable
- Toyota Brevis, a mid-sized luxury sedan
- Brevis, a French surname

== See also ==
- Brevis muscle (disambiguation), several muscles in the human body
- Ars longa, vita brevis ("art is long, life is short"), part of an aphorism by Ancient Greek physician Hippocrates
- Exposito en Brevis in Lucam ("A Brief Commentary on Luke"), a work by the ninth-century Benedictine monk Christian of Stavelot
- Missa brevis, a "short Mass", referring to the Christian liturgy
- Vita Brevis ("Brief Life"), a book written by Jostein Gaarder, published in 1996
- Brevi, an Italian surname
