= All-Trac =

Proprietary full-time four-wheel drive system by Toyota

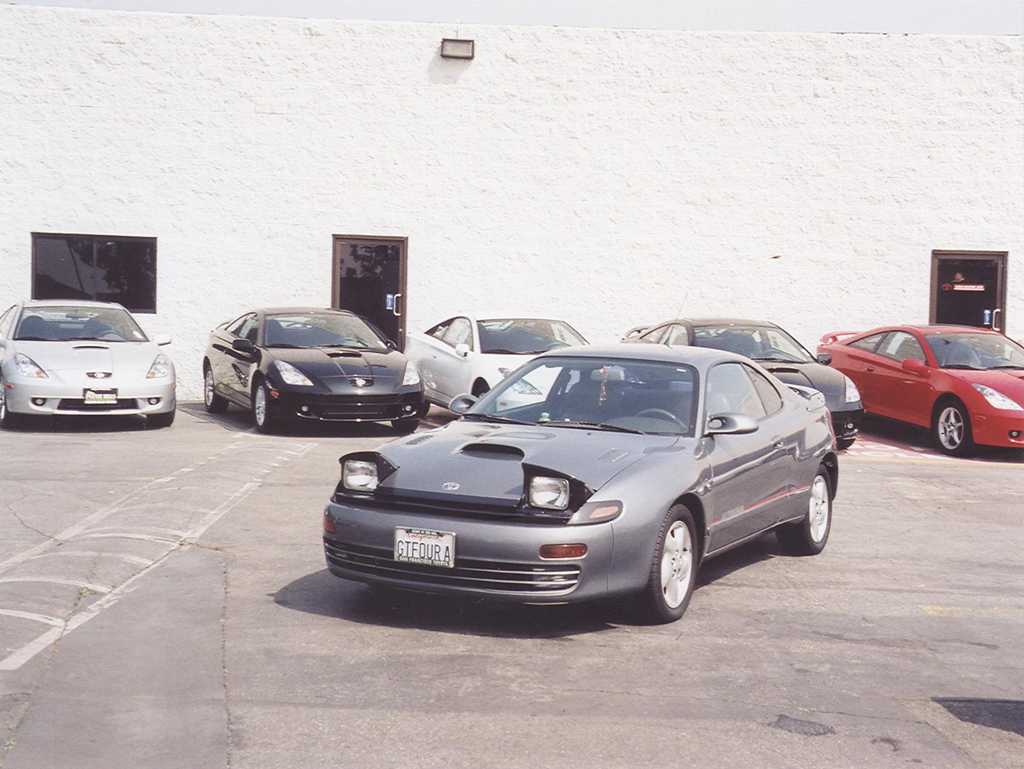
Toyota Celica All-Trac Turbo ST185

All-Trac was a proprietary full-time four-wheel drive system used on a variety of Toyota badged models and the nameplate was used from 1988 to 2000. It was considered a revolutionary advance for four wheel drive automobiles into the mainstream consumer market and its electronic/vacuum controlled locking center differential was rare in a passenger car. The system originated in Japan under the GT-Four name in 1986, but was not released in the U.S. until 1988 under the All-Trac name.

== Technical information ==
The All-Trac system had five main parts: the front differential, rear differential, center differential, the transmission, and the transfer case. The transmission, front differential, center differential and transfer case are all one large assembly and are connected to the transversely mounted engine. The transmission bell housing, front differential and center differential can be separated from the transfer case sub assembly. The transmission output shaft feeds power into the front/center differential assembly (the center differential is contained within the front differential). The center differential applied equal torque to both the front and rear wheels.

For all manual transmission models except Previa, and the 1988 and newer Celica, there is a small button inside the vehicle labelled Center Diff. Lock and when activated, the transfer case locks, resulting in the front and rear differential input shafts being driven at the same speed. The result of this is that if the vehicle is in a situation where traction is uneven or poor (i.e. muddy or snowy), the car can move with traction in either the front or rear wheels.

For the Celica, the original ST165 GT-Four of October 1986 had "Center Diff. Lock" with switch located near the hand brake, and starting from the facelift model of October 1987 came with transfer case contains a viscous coupling unit that provides 50/50 power distribution to the front and rear differentials at all times, as in the Previa All-Trac models. Neither the Previa nor the Celica have a lockable transfer case, but the viscous coupling can be temporarily disabled for testing purposes via a selector switch on the transfer case assembly. The vehicle should not be driven with the viscous coupling disabled as transfer case or transmission damage will occur. Some Celicas were equipped with a Torsen torque-biasing rear differential which apportions torque to the left and right wheels depending on available traction, up to a mechanically determined maximum torque bias ratio or TBR.

== Model series ==
- 1988–1991 Toyota Camry (V20), DX and LE trim, 4 cylinder 1998 cc 3S-FE
- 1988–1992 Toyota Corolla (E90), std trim, SR5, 4 cylinder 1587 cc 4A-FE
- 1990–1999 Toyota Previa (XR10), DX, LE, LE supercharged trim, 4 cylinder 2438 cc 2TZ
- 1988–1993 Toyota Celica GT-Four 1988–1989 for ST165 chassis, 1990-1993 for ST185 chassis, all with 4 cylinder turbo 1998 cc 3S-GTE
- 1989-1995 Toyota Starlet (P80)
- 1995–2000 Toyota RAV4 (XA10), with 4 cylinder 1998 cc 3S-FE
- 1992–2007 Toyota Caldina
- 1992-2001 Toyota Cresta (X90)
- 1992-2001 Toyota Chaser (X90)
- 1991-2020 Toyota Aristo
- 2001-2004 Toyota Verossa
- 1996-2007 Toyota Mark II (X100)
- 2004-2019 Toyota Mark X
- 2001-2007 Toyota Brevis
- 2001-2007 Toyota Progrès
- 2001-2021 Toyota Allion, Toyota Premio
- 2020-present Lexus ES (XZ10)

== Predecessors and successors ==
Toyota's GT-Four / All-Trac system was originally released on the ST165 chassis Celica that was only available in Japan. The system used a locking transfer case that was the same as the electric/vacuum system that is found on U.S. All-Trac Camrys. For the 1988 model year when the U.S. All-trac system arrival, the Celica GT-Four / All-Trac had changed the transfer case to a viscous coupling unit.

== See also ==
- E-four
- quattro - Audi branded four wheel drive system
- 4motion - Volkswagen branded four wheel drive system
- 4Matic - a four-wheel drive system from Mercedes-Benz
- ATTESA - a four-wheel drive system from Nissan
- xDrive - a four-wheel drive system from BMW
- SH-AWD - a four-wheel torque vectoring system from Honda
- S-AWC - a torque vectoring four-wheel drive system from Mitsubishi Motors
