= Brevis muscle =

In human anatomy, a brevis muscle derives its name from the Latin brevis meaning "short", and can refer to:

== Arm ==
- Extensor carpi radialis brevis muscle, a muscle in the middle of the forearm that manipulates the wrist so the hand moves away from the palm and towards the thumb
- Extensor pollicis brevis muscle, a skeletal muscle on the dorsal side of the forearm

== Hand ==
- Abductor pollicis brevis muscle, a muscle in the hand that functions as an abductor of the thumb
- Flexor digiti minimi brevis (hand), a muscle in the hand that flexes the little finger
- Flexor pollicis brevis muscle, a muscle in the hand that flexes the thumb
- Palmaris brevis muscle, a thin, quadrilateral muscle, beneath the integument of the ulnar side of the hand

== Leg ==
- Adductor brevis muscle, a muscle in the thigh used for moving the hip

== Foot ==
Extensor brevis group

- Extensor digitorum brevis muscle, a muscle on the upper surface of the foot that helps extend digits 2 through 4
- Extensor hallucis brevis muscle, a muscle on the top of the foot that helps to extend the big toe

Flexor brevis group

- Flexor digiti minimi brevis muscle (foot), a muscle under the metatarsal bone of the little toe
- Flexor digitorum brevis muscle, a muscle in the middle of the sole of the foot
- Flexor hallucis brevis muscle, a muscle in sole of the foot that leads to the big toe

Other

- Peroneus brevis, a muscle that acts in plantarflexion and eversion of the foot
