= Brevi =

Brevi is an Italian surname. Notable people with the surname include:

- Ezio Brevi (born 1970), Italian footballer and manager
- Giovanni Battista Brevi, Italian Baroque composer
- Oscar Brevi (born 1967), Italian footballer and manager

== See also ==
- Brevis (disambiguation)
