= Toyota Origin =

Toyota Origin (JCG17)
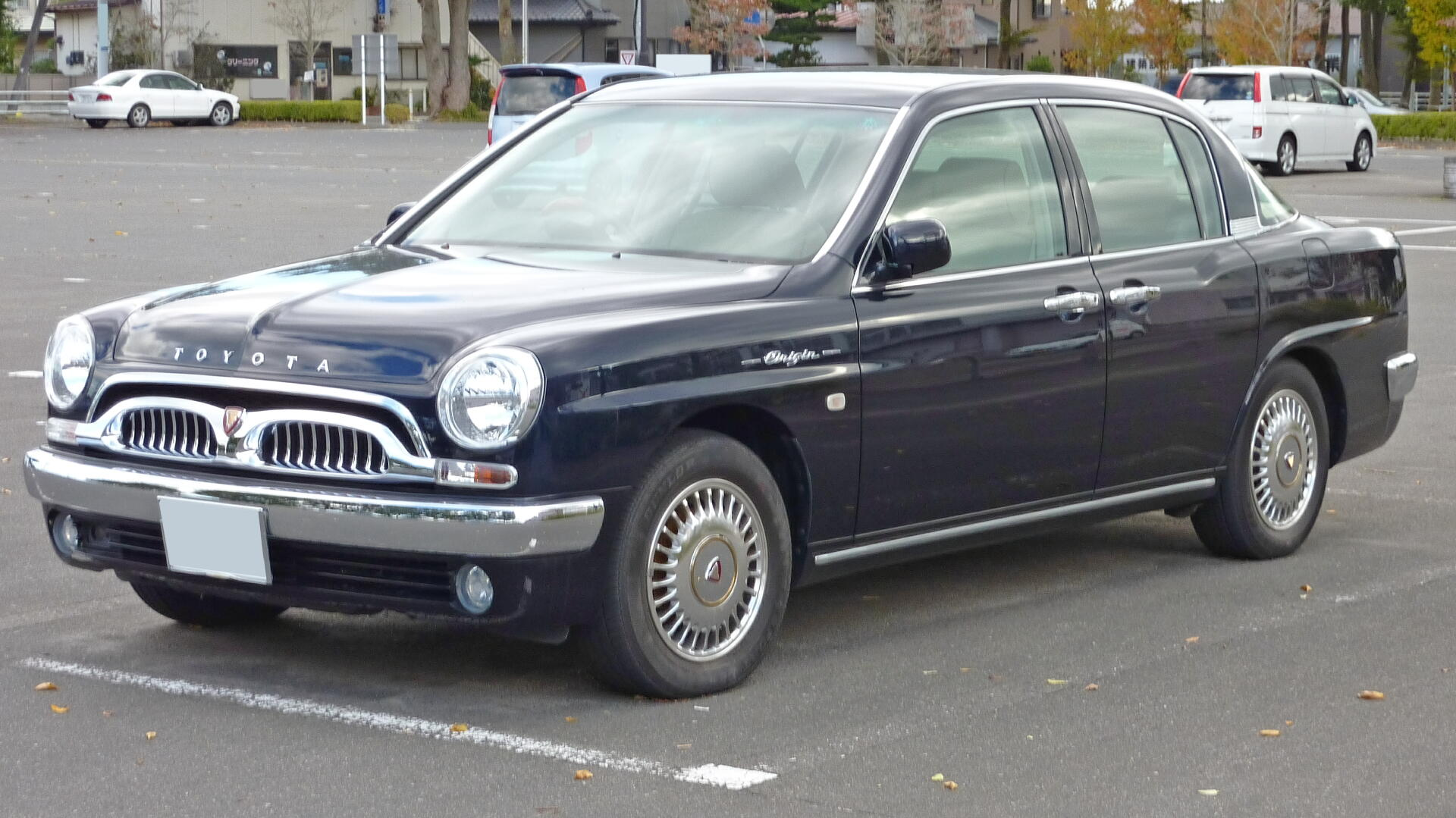

Overview
- Manufacturer: Toyota
- Production: May 2000 – April 2001 (1,073 units)
- Assembly: Japan: Susono, Shizuoka (Kanto Auto Works, Higashi Fuji plant)

Body and chassis
- Class: Mid-size car
- Body style: 4-door sedan
- Layout: Front-engine, rear-wheel-drive
- Related: Toyota Progrès; Toyota Brevis; Toyota Altezza; Toyopet Crown (RS) (design styling)

Powertrain
- Engine: 3.0 L 2JZ-GE I6 (petrol)
- Transmission: 4-speed automatic

Dimensions
- Wheelbase: 2,780 mm (109.4 in)
- Length: 4,560 mm (179.5 in)
- Width: 1,745 mm (68.7 in)
- Height: 1,455 mm (57.3 in)
- Kerb weight: 1,560 kg (3,439 lb)

The Toyota Origin (Japanese: トヨタ・オリジン, Toyota Orijin) is a limited edition mid-size car made by Toyota and sold in Japan between 2000 and 2001, having been launched in November 2000. It was planned that only 1,000 models would be built, but, in fact, 1,073 were produced. In Japan, it was sold at Toyota Store, Toyopet Store and Corolla Store Japanese dealerships.

The Origin features a distinct retro style body modeled from the RS series Toyopet Crown and built using the same platform and inline-six engine as the Progrès. The price was ¥7,000,000. The car was built by Kanto Auto Works in Higashi Fuji plant.

The vehicle's design employed many features unusual on modern vehicles to make it reminiscent of the original Crown, including rear suicide doors, a rearward-slanting C-pillar and jewel tail lamps.

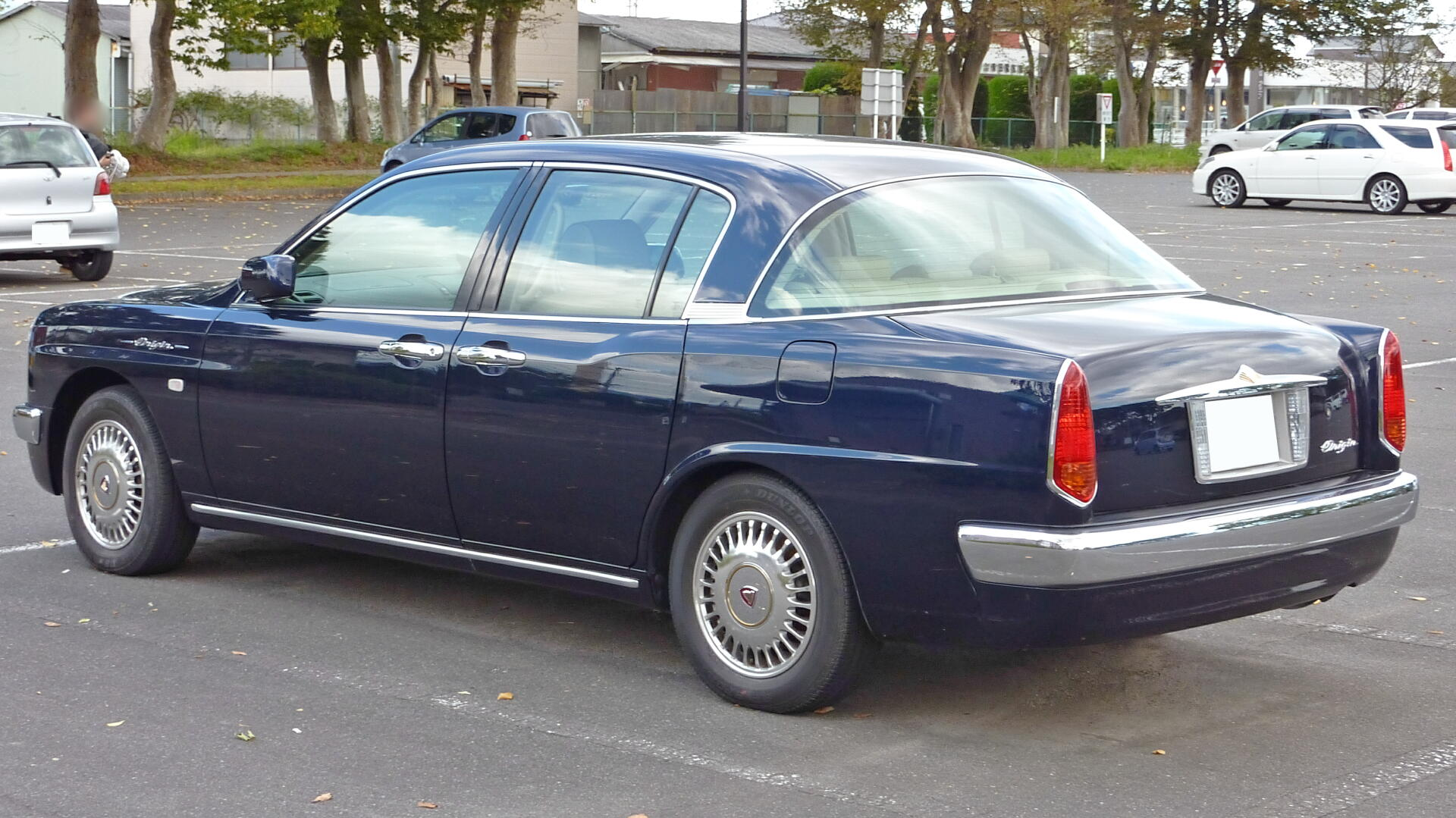
Rear view

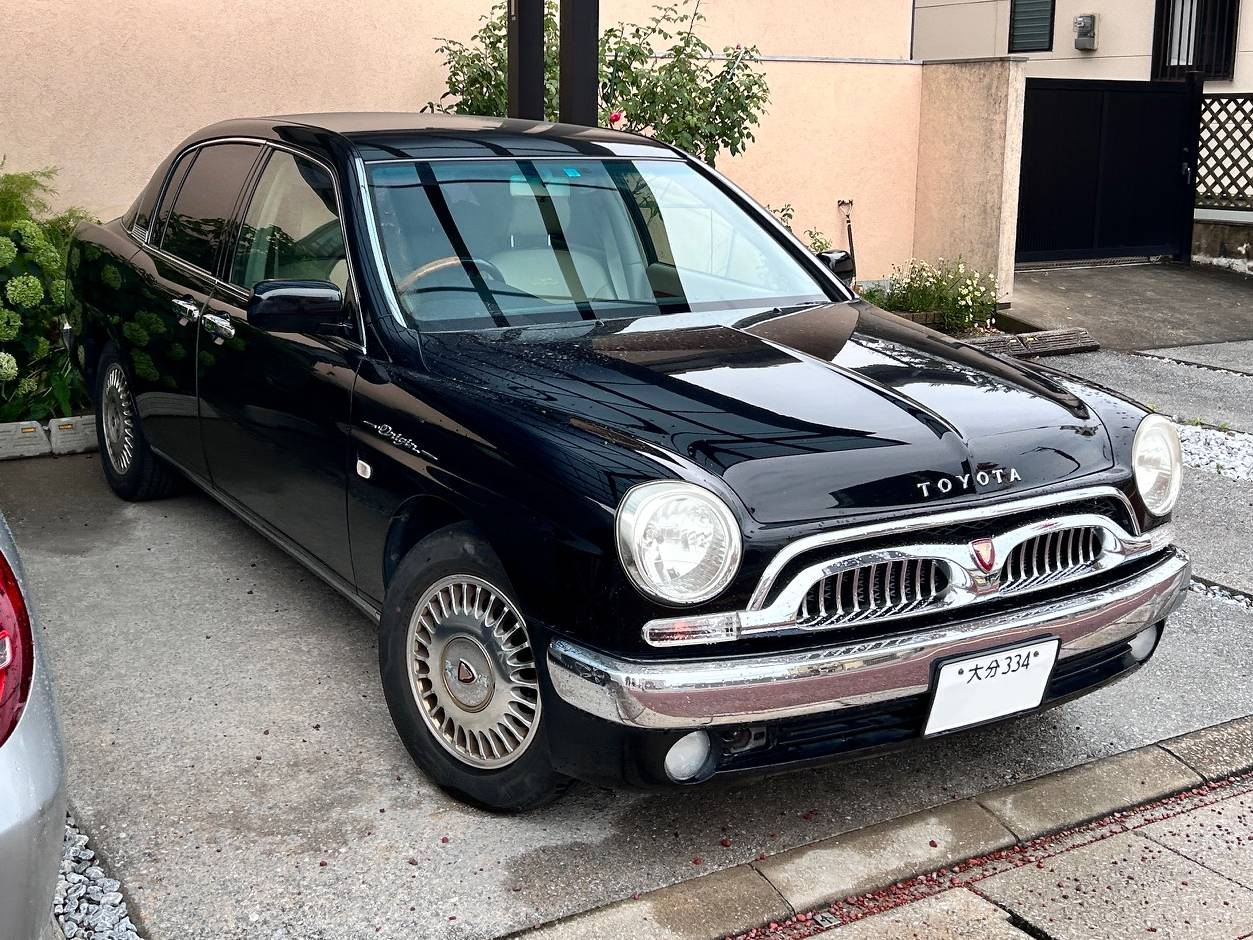
Front view
