= Flexor brevis muscle =

Flexor brevis muscle may refer to:

Foot

- Flexor digiti minimi brevis muscle (foot)
- Flexor digitorum brevis muscle
- Flexor hallucis brevis muscle

Hand

- Flexor digiti minimi brevis muscle (hand)
- Flexor pollicis brevis muscle
