= Toyota Progrès =

Mid-size luxury sedan

Toyota Progrès (XG10)
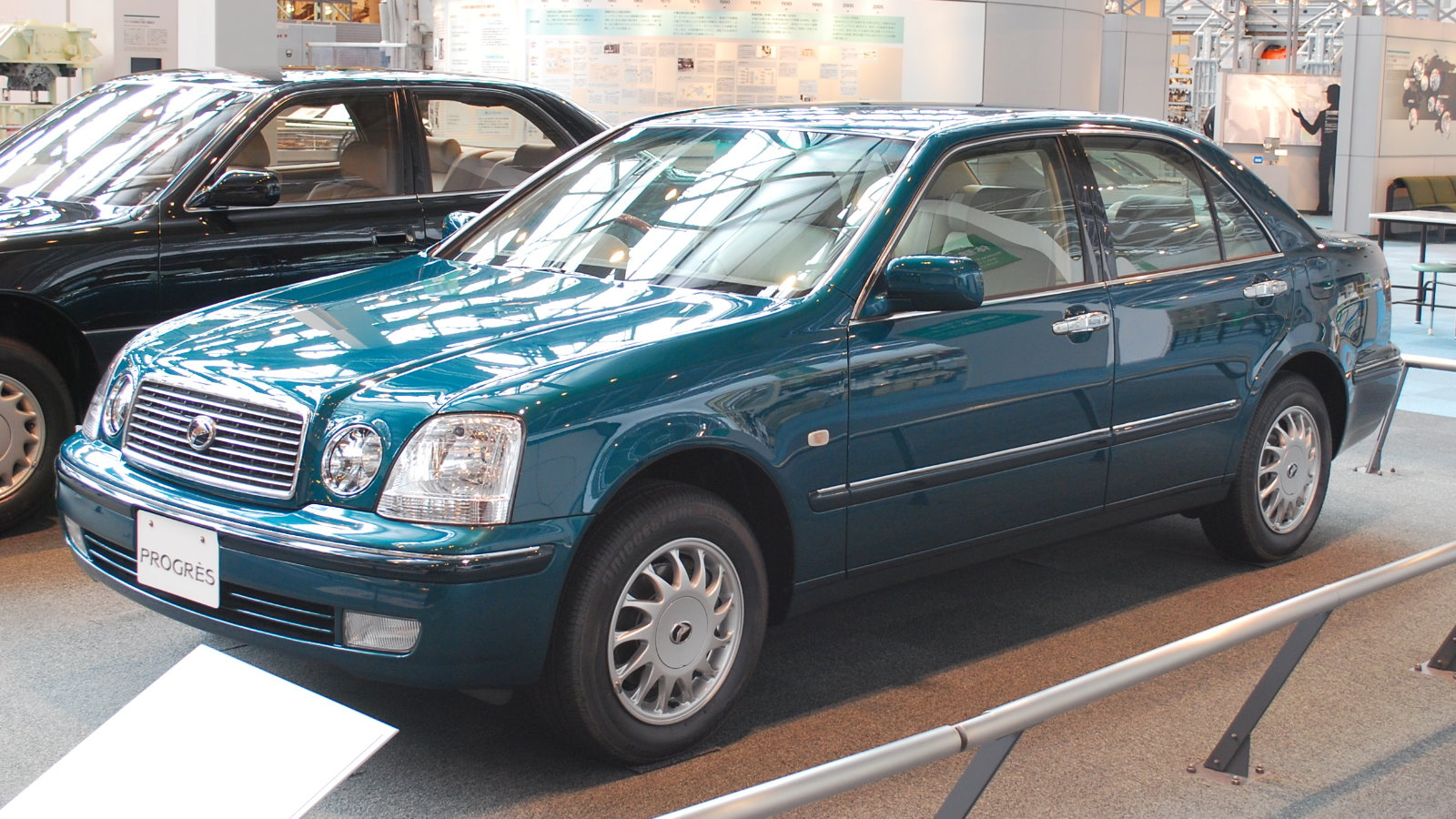
- 1998 Toyota Progrès NC250

Overview
- Manufacturer: Toyota
- Production: May 1998– June 2007 (77,835 units)
- Assembly: Japan: Toyota City, Aichi (Motomachi plant)

Body and chassis
- Class: Luxury car
- Body style: 4-door sedan
- Layout: FR (optional AWD)
- Related: Lexus IS; Toyota Brevis; Toyota Origin; Toyota Verossa; Toyota Mark II

Powertrain
- Engine: 2.5L 1JZ-GE I6; 2.5L 1JZ-FSE I6; 3.0L 2JZ-GE I6; 3.0L 2JZ-FSE I6

Dimensions
- Wheelbase: 2,780 mm (109.4 in)
- Length: 1998-2001：4,500 mm (177.2 in); 2001-2007：4,510 mm (177.6 in)
- Width: 1,700 mm (66.9 in)
- Height: 1,435 mm (56.5 in)
- Curb weight: 1,550 kg (3,417 lb)

Chronology
- Predecessor: Toyota Corona EXiV
- Successor: Toyota Sai

The Toyota Progrès (pronounced プログレ "Pu-ro-gu-reh") is a mid-size luxury sedan which was sold in Japan from May 1998 to June 2007, replacing the Toyota Corona EXiV.

The name "progrès" is French for "progress". Like the Century, it was one of the few models that did not have Toyota's emblem on the exterior or interior. Instead, an emblem featuring the "P" logo of the car's name was placed on the front grille, trunk lid, wheel center caps, steering wheel, and key. The "NC" in the grade name was also an acronym for "NEO CATEGORY."

== Overview ==
The Progrès model came with six airbags, voice-operated GPS called G-Book, and "NAVI AI-SHIFT" which was one of the first GPS-controlled automatic transmission (mechanics). The car had wood and leather interiors, an analog clock with either gold or silver trim, climate controls for two zones, and automatically operated headlights and wipers. Despite having the same platform as the Lexus IS, the Progrès had been made for greater passenger room and more flexible suspension design due to the use of double wishbone system on front and rear axles.

The Progrès is available in a standard model, a "Walnut Package" with a walnut interior, a "Noble Interior Package" with bird's-eye maple wood panels, an "iR Version" with stiffer suspension (with a woodgrain interior), and an "iR Version Walnut Package."

In May 1999, Progrès first sport model was added to the lineup. The iR variant features a dark-toned front grille, headlights, and rear combination lamps, as well as plated aluminum wheels and newly developed "soft privacy glass." The interior is available in only one color, black, and is equipped with special genuine leather seats.

The Progrès included 2.5 L or 3.0 L JZ inline 6-cylinder engines with VVT-i. Since April 2001, the Progrès used 1JZ-FSE (2.5 L) and 2JZ-FSE (3.0 L) direct injection (D4) engines, the same unit that was installed in the Crown, and Aristo. The versions with a 1JZ engine were called NC250, and those with a 2JZ engine NC300.

The Progrès was exclusive to Toyota Japan dealerships Toyopet Store, while its twin the Brevis was exclusive to Toyota Store locations, and shared a marketing approach used on the Toyota Vista Store alternative, called the Toyota Verossa. The width and engine displacement exceed Japanese government regulations concerning exterior dimensions and engine displacement, and therefore it classified in the larger "passenger car" tax bracket. Two engine sizes were offered to allow Japanese buyers which annual road tax they were willing to pay; the larger engine did offer higher levels of standard equipment and luxury features.

The Progrès was discontinued in Japan in June 2007, while the slightly smaller Toyota Premio continued as an affordable luxury car offering.

== Gallery ==
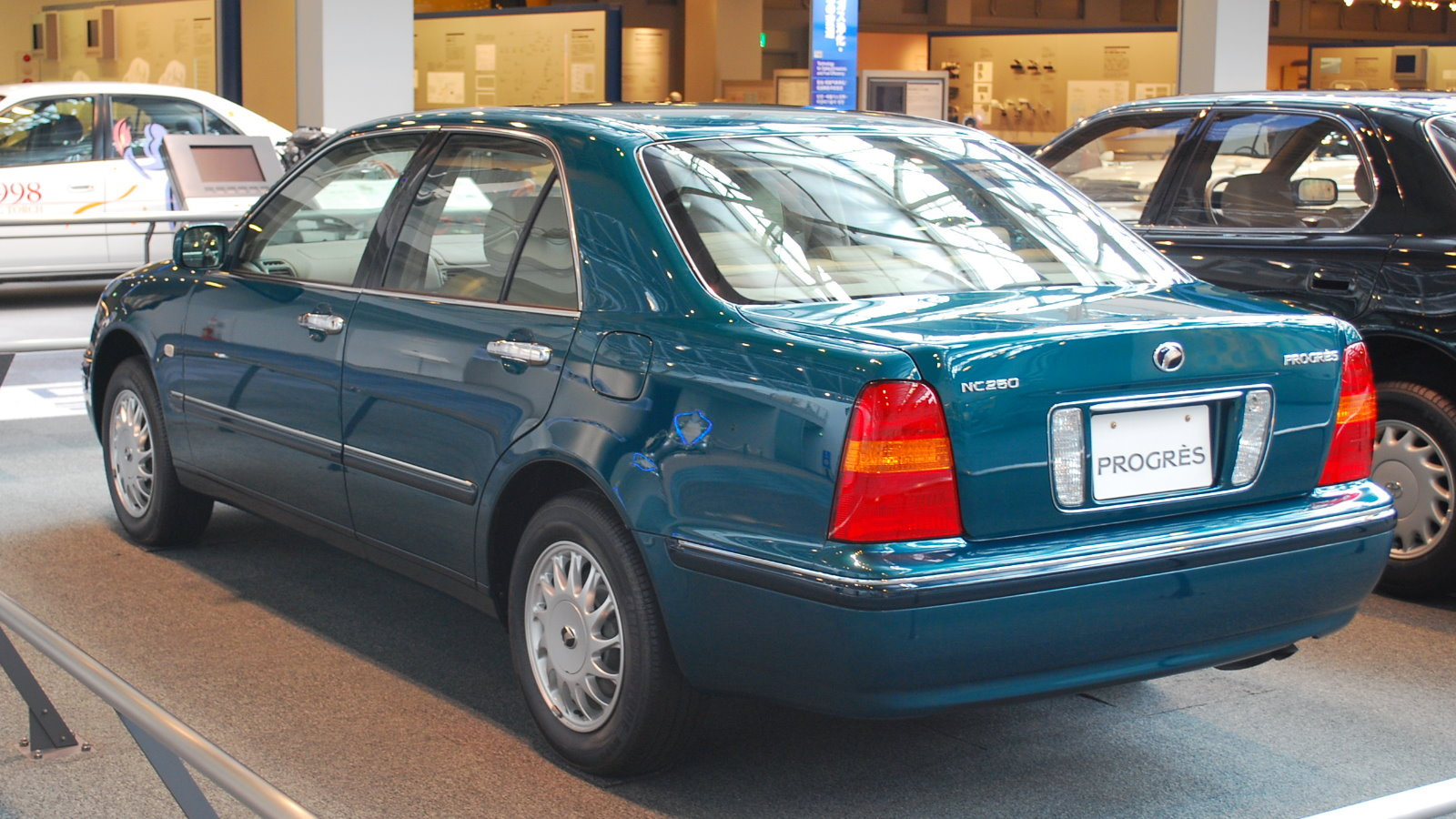
1998 Toyota Progrès rear

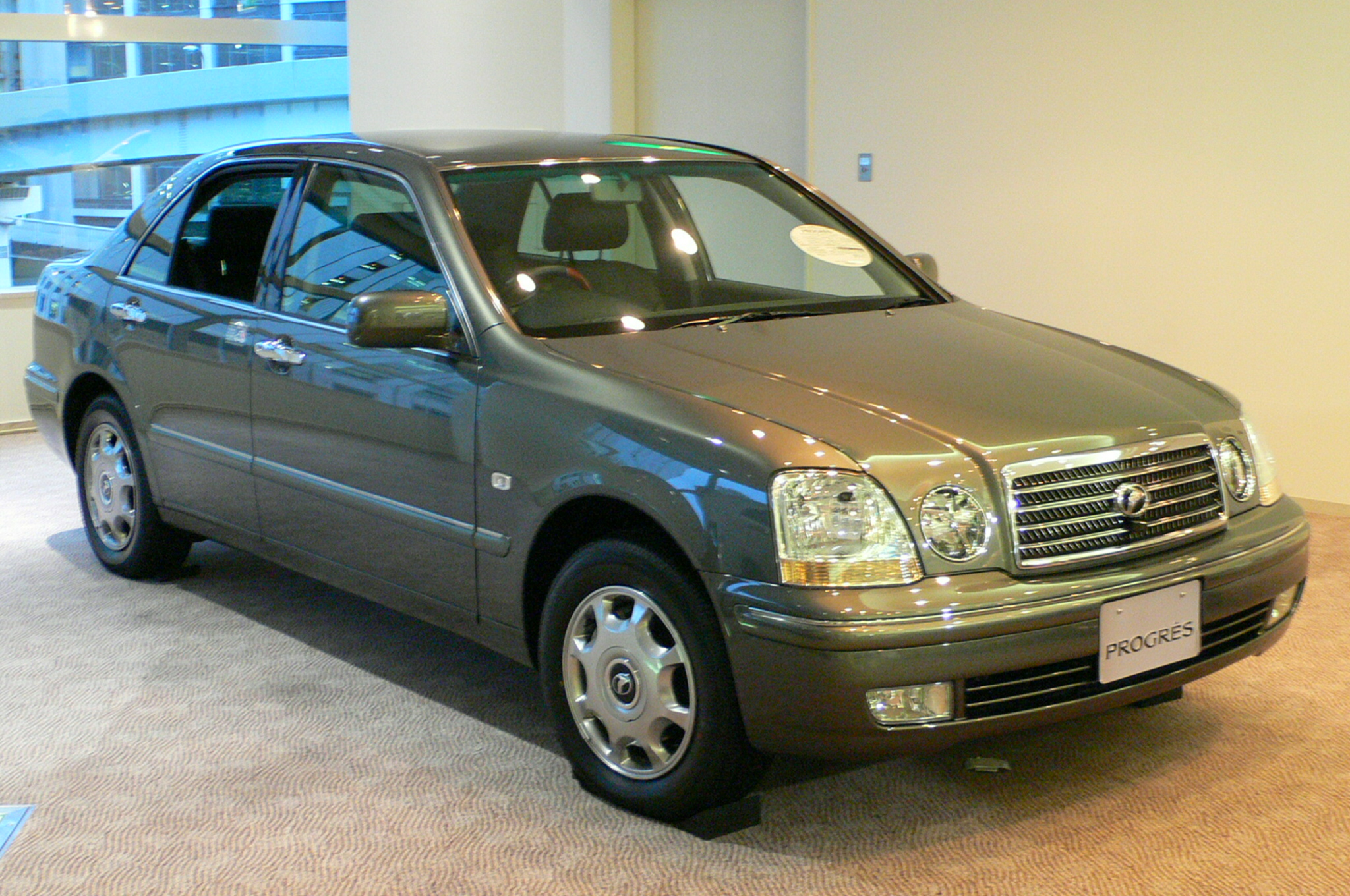
2001–2007 Toyota Progrès

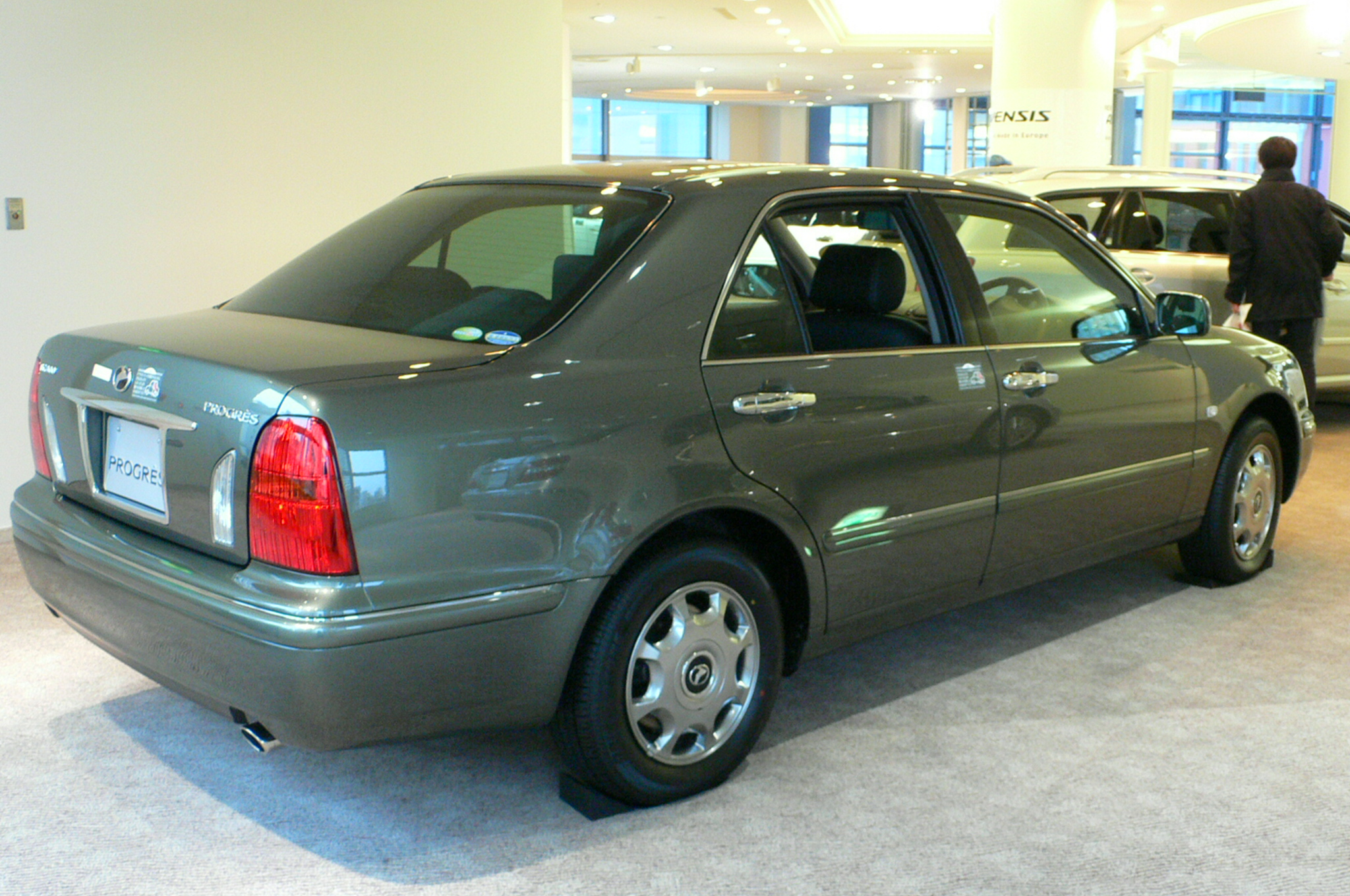
2001–2007 Toyota Progrès rear

== See also ==
- Toyota Brevis
