= Brevis crassiductus =

Scientific classification
- Domain: Eukaryota
- Kingdom: Animalia
- Phylum: Arthropoda
- Class: Insecta
- Order: Lepidoptera
- Superfamily: Noctuoidea
- Family: Erebidae
- Genus: Brevis; Fibiger, 2008
- Species: B. crassiductus

Binomial name
- Brevis crassiductus Fibiger, 2008

Species of moth

Brevis crassiductus is the only species in the monotypic moth genus Brevis of the family Erebidae. It is known from the mountains of south-central Sri Lanka. Both the genus and the species were first described by Michael Fibiger in 2008.

Adults have been found in October.

The wingspan is about 9 mm.
