= Extensor brevis muscle =

Extensor brevis muscle may refer to:

Foot:

- extensor digitorum brevis muscle
- extensor hallucis brevis muscle

Arm:

- extensor carpi radialis brevis muscle
- extensor pollicis brevis muscle
