= Toyota Premio =

Compact sedan

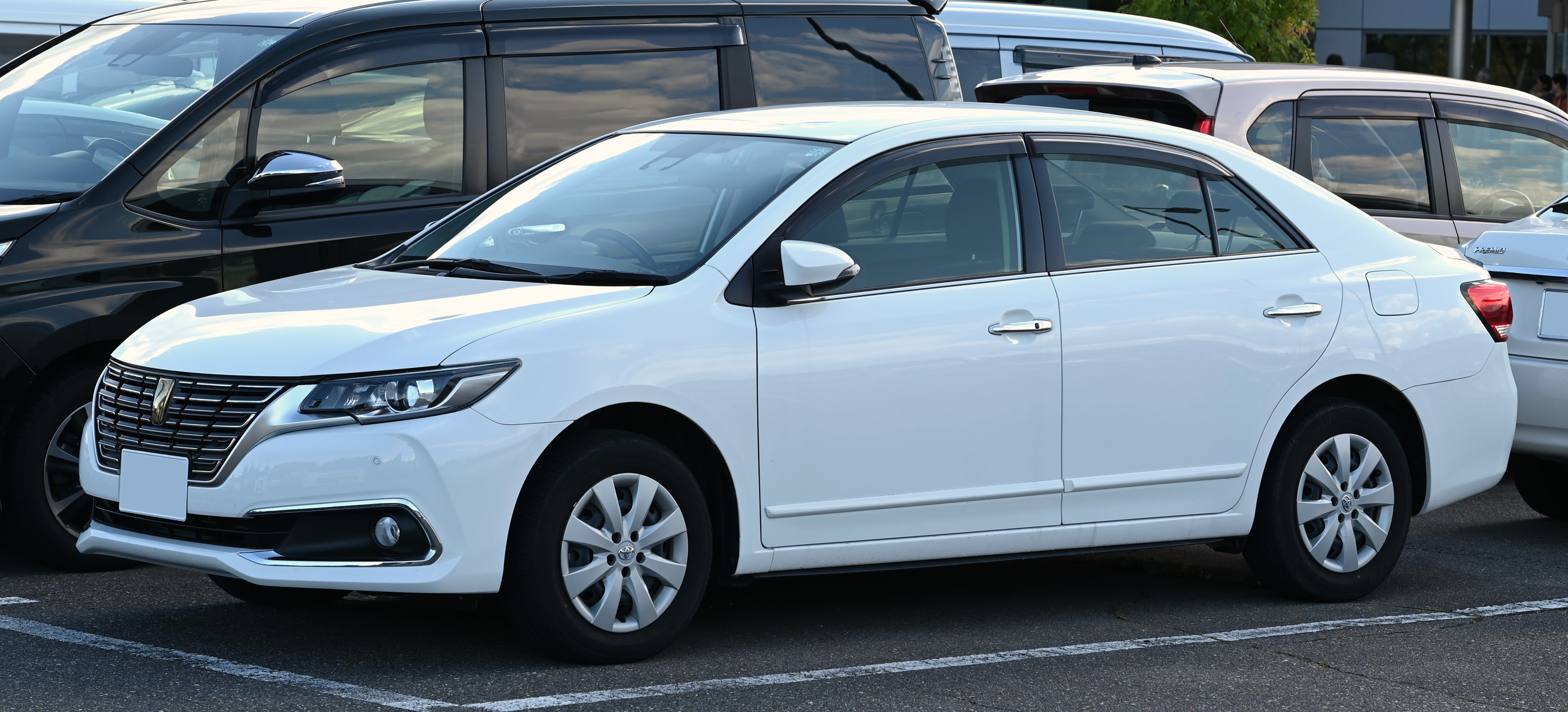
- 2016–2021 Toyota Premio (Japan)

Overview
- Manufacturer: Toyota
- Also called: Toyota Allion
- Production: December 2001 – March 2021
- Assembly: Japan: Toyota City, Aichi (Tsutsumi plant)

Body and chassis
- Class: Compact car
- Body style: 4-door sedan
- Layout: Front-engine, front-wheel-drive; Front-engine, four-wheel-drive
- Platform: Toyota MC platform

Chronology
- Predecessor: Toyota Corona (Premio); Toyota Carina (Allion)
- Successor: Toyota Corolla (E210)

The Toyota Premio (Japanese: トヨタ・プレミオ, Toyota Puremio) and its twin the Toyota Allion (Japanese: トヨタ・アリオン, Toyota Arion) are sedans sold in Japan from 2001 to 2021 by Toyota. The sedans are designated as a compact car by Japanese dimension regulations and the exterior dimensions do not change with periodic updates. Unlike Toyota's other vehicles, the Premio and Allion were not exported, and were exclusively sold in Japan only. Size and pricing-wise, the E210 Corolla, introduced to the Japanese market in 2018 succeeds the Premio and Allion.

The Premio is the successor of the Corona which first appeared in 1957. The Corona EXiV, a four-door hardtop sedan that appeared in 1989, was replaced by the Progrès, which was also briefly available with the Premio until 2007. The Premio is exclusive to Toyopet Store dealerships, as a smaller companion to the Mark X.

The Allion replaced the Carina, a model that first appeared in 1970. The Carina ED, a four-door hardtop sedan that appeared in 1985, was replaced by the Brevis, which was briefly available with the Allion until 2007. The Allion is exclusive to Toyota Store dealerships, as a smaller companion to the Crown.

Both cars are related to the Avensis, which is an imported five-door station wagon from Europe, available at all Japanese dealership locations. The Camry, which is the largest car exclusive to Toyota Corolla Store locations, is slightly larger. The name "Premio" is Spanish for "premium" or "prize", while the "Allion" name is derived from the phrase "all-in-one".

Mechanically, they are identical to the Avensis which is exported new internationally as well as sold in Japan. The Premio/Allion are only offered as four-door sedans, while the Avensis was available only as a five-door station wagon to Japanese buyers. The first generation Premio is more upscale and luxurious than the Allion. The Premio features wood trim and chrome accents, while the Allion is considered to be a sporty or executive type car.

Appearance modification options made for the first generation Allion are not made or marketed for the Premio. The second generation cars share the interior appearances and optional equipment, with exterior visual differences. Three options packages are offered with the three different engines offered, coupled with the choice of front- or four-wheel drive.

== First generation (T240; 2001) ==
First generation (T240)
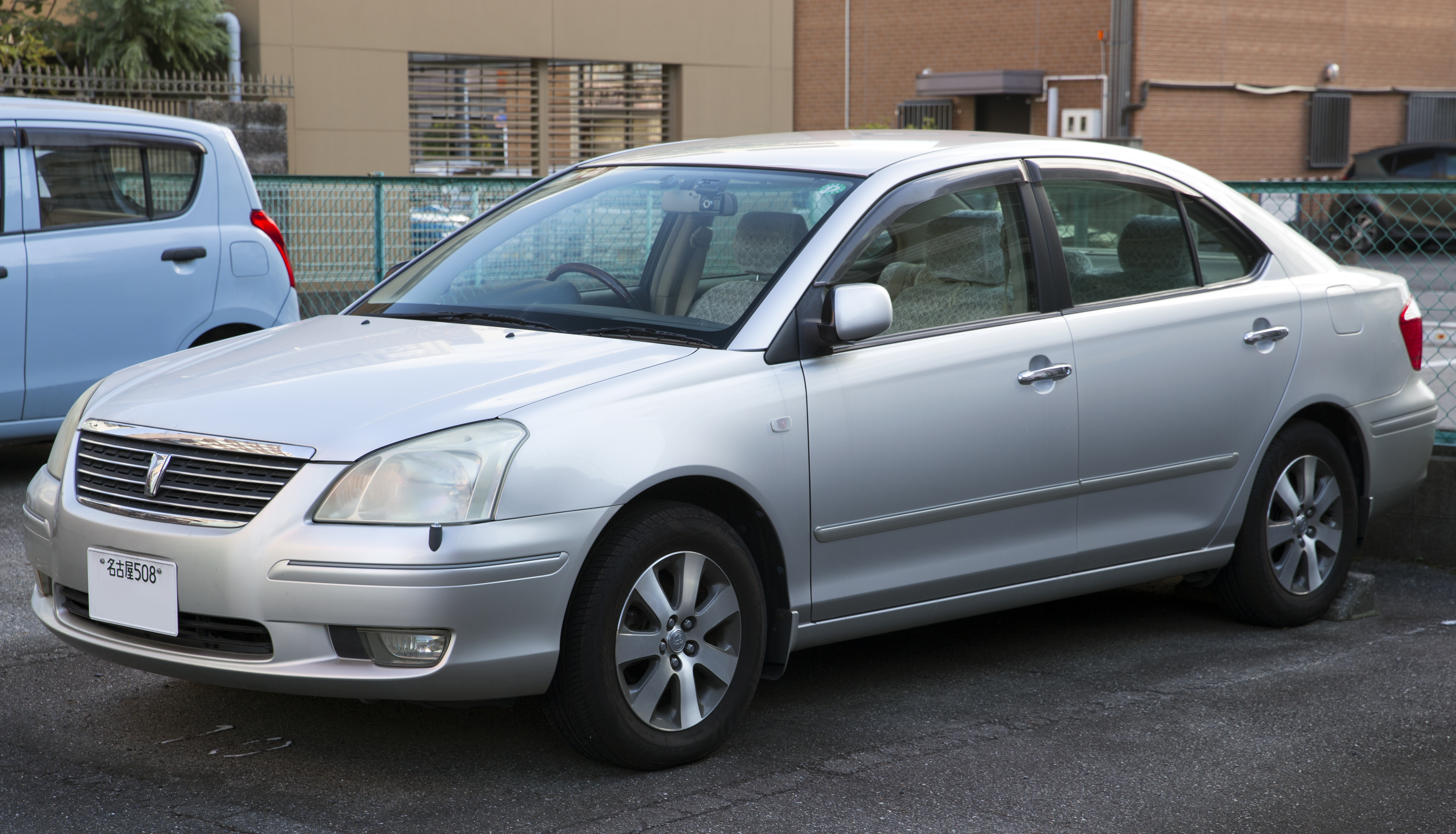
- 2001–2004 Toyota Premio (pre-facelift)

Overview
- Also called: Toyota Allion
- Production: December 2001 – June 2007
- Designer: Hiroshi Okamoto (Allion)

Body and chassis
- Related: Toyota Avensis (T250); Toyota Caldina (T240); Toyota Wish (AE10)

Powertrain
- Engine: 1.5 L 1NZ-FE I4; 1.8 L 1ZZ-FE I4; 2.0 L 1AZ-FSE I4
- Transmission: 4-speed automatic (1NZ-FE and 1ZZ-FE); CVT (1AZ-FSE)

Dimensions
- Wheelbase: 2,700 mm (106.3 in)
- Length: 4,565 mm (179.7 in)
- Width: 1,695 mm (66.7 in)
- Height: 1,470 mm (57.9 in)
- Curb weight: 1,140–1,280 kg (2,510–2,820 lb)

The first generation Premio and Allion were launched on 25 December 2001. The Premio sedan has a more elegant approach in comparison to the Allion, which has an emphasis towards younger buyers. The Premio and Allion share the same engines and interior. The Allion can be specced with front spoilers and rear mounted trunk wings, as well as ground effect body parts to enhance the vehicles appearance which are specially designed and sold by Toyota. The Allion also features rear tilting seats (similar to front seats). The Allion continues the Toyota tradition by being made in taxi usage, driving school and law enforcement versions.

On 20 December 2004, the Premio received a modest restyle with the introduction of LED tail lights. The Allion also received an update at the same time.

Both cars were offered with three engine sizes; 1.5-, 1.8- and 2.0-liter. The 2.0-liter model received a CVT; the smaller engines were each fitted with a four-speed torque converter automatic transmission.

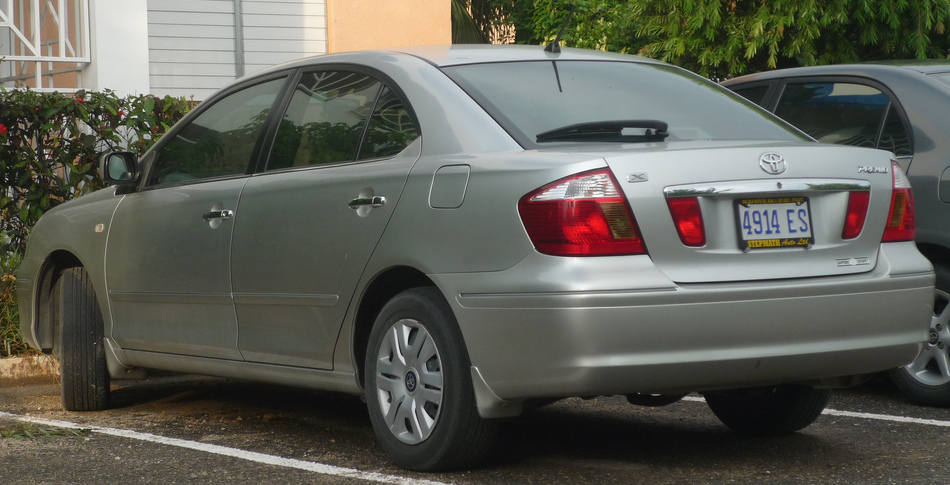
2001–2004 Toyota Premio (pre-facelift)

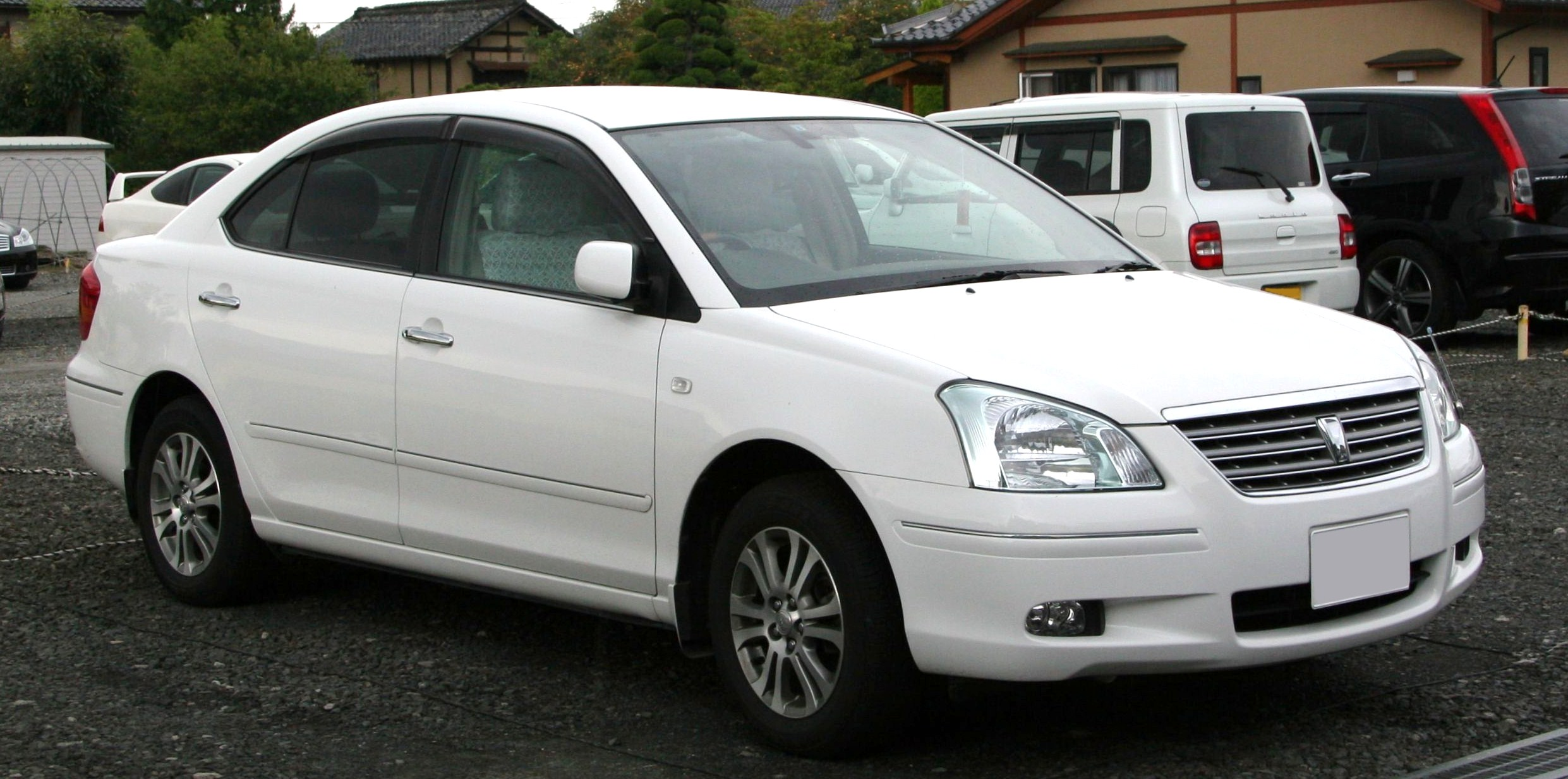
2004–2007 Toyota Premio (facelift)

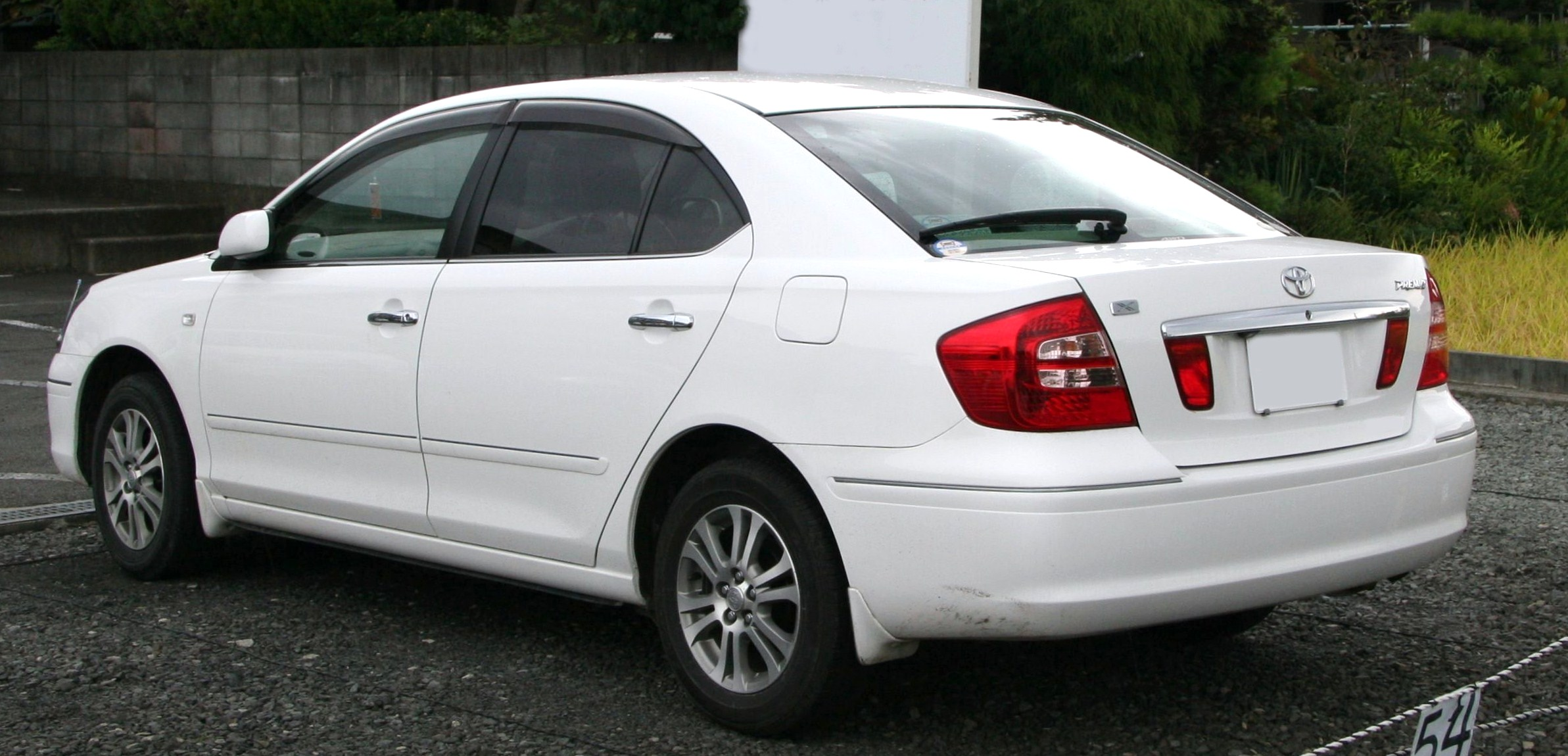
2004–2007 Toyota Premio (facelift)

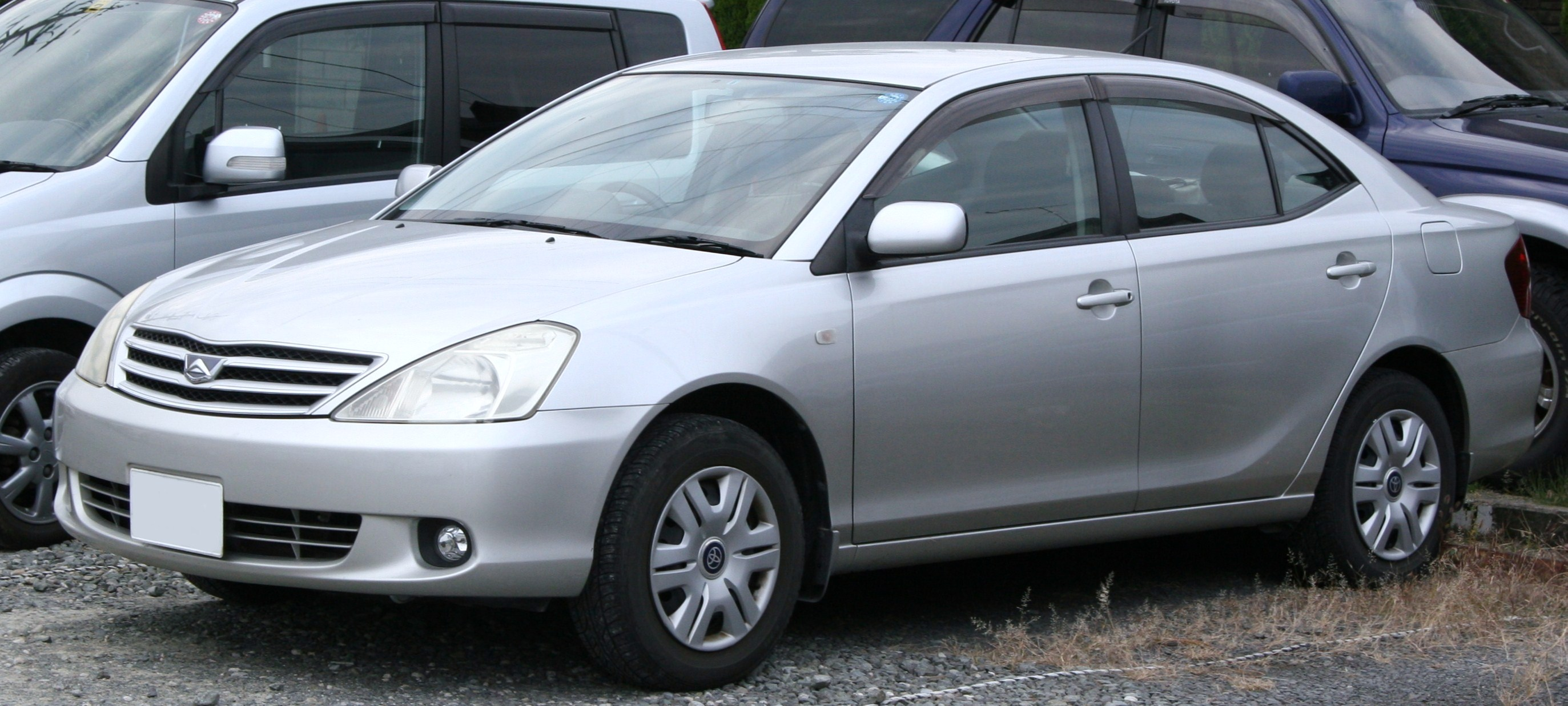
2001–2004 Toyota Allion (pre-facelift)

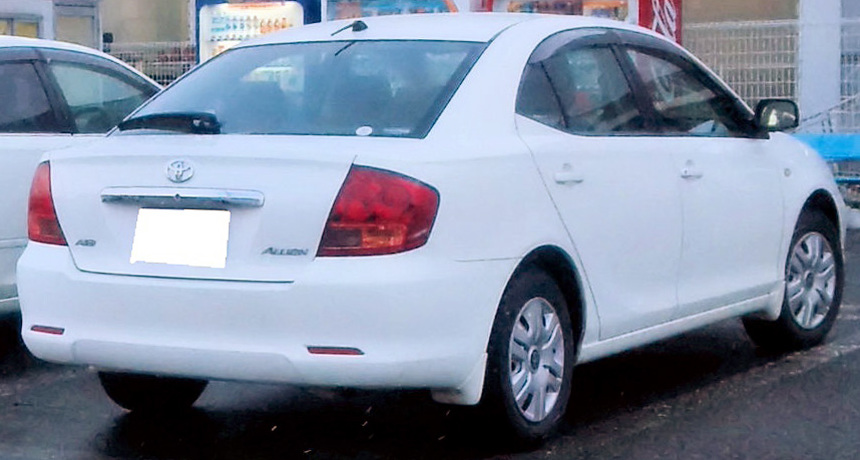
2001–2004 Toyota Allion (pre-facelift)

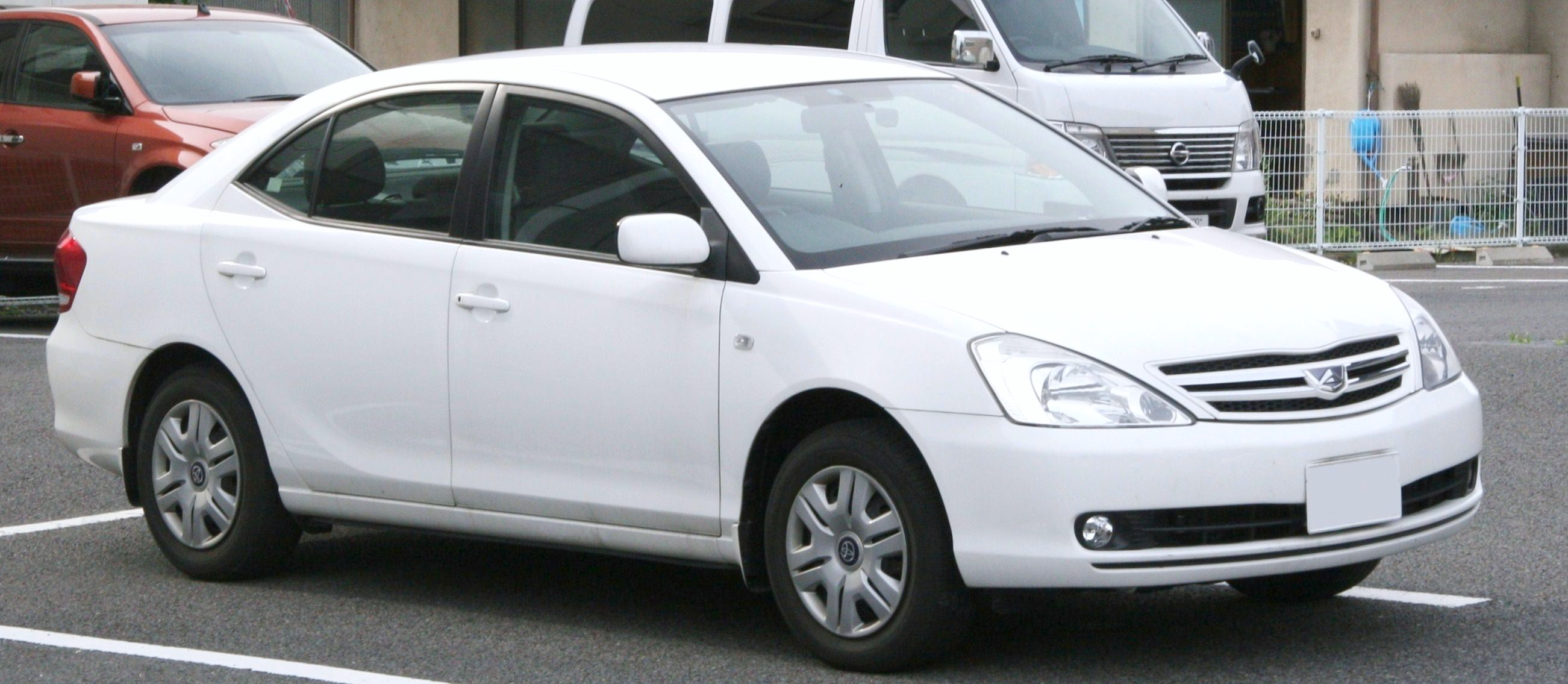
2004–2007 Toyota Allion (facelift)

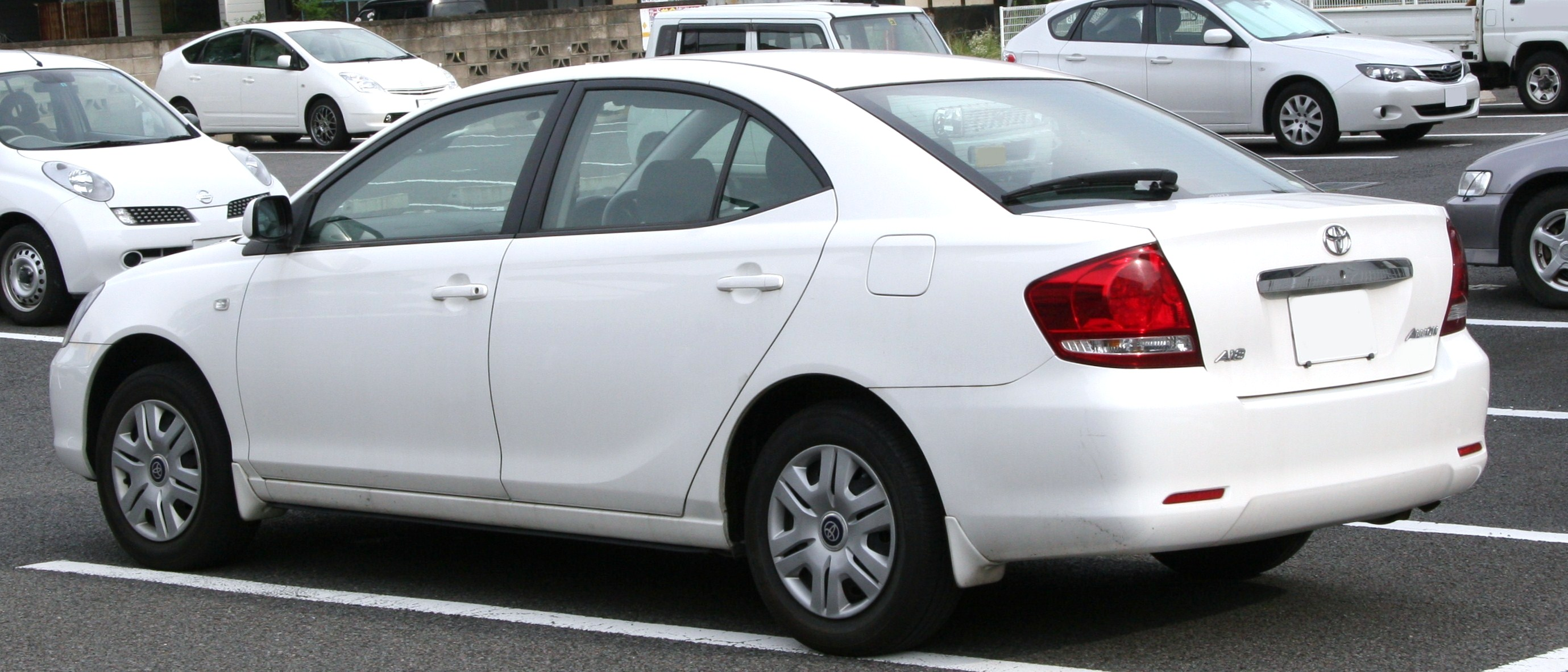
2004–2007 Toyota Allion (facelift)

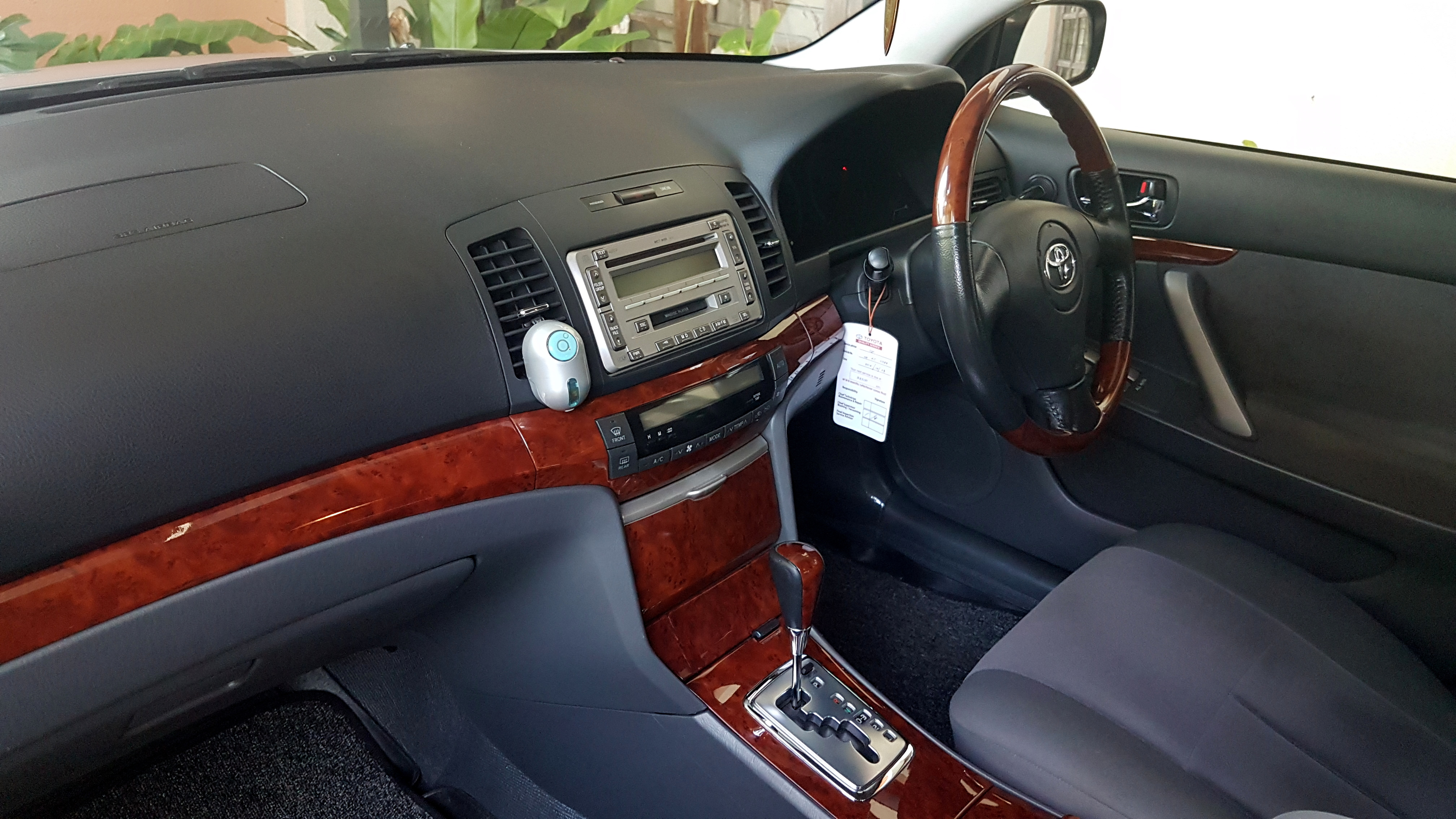
Toyota Allion interior

== Second generation (T260; 2007) ==
Second generation (T260)
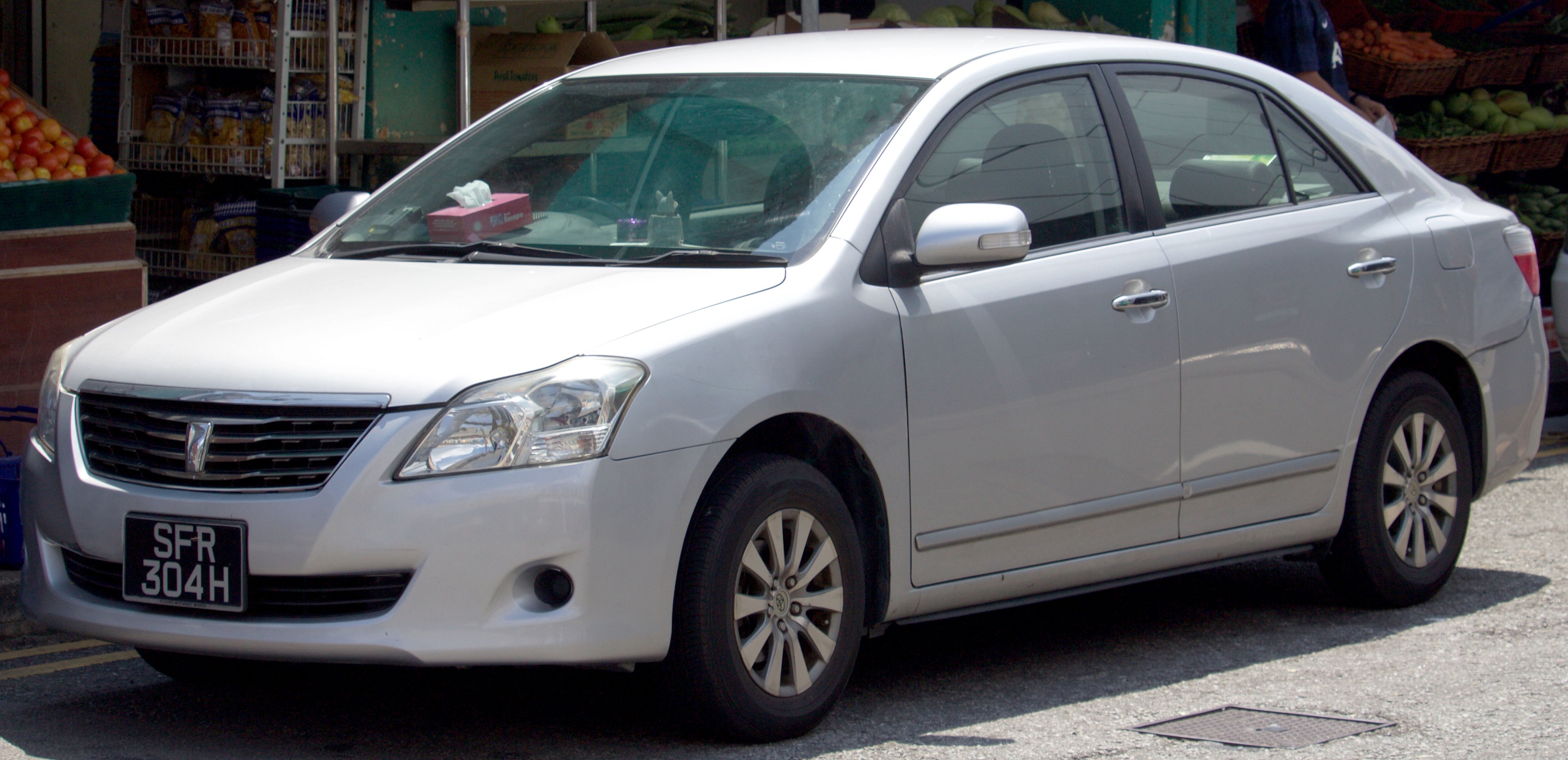
- 2007–2010 Toyota Premio (pre-facelift)

Overview
- Also called: Toyota Allion
- Production: June 2007 – March 2021

Body and chassis
- Related: Toyota Avensis (T270); Toyota Wish (AE20)

Powertrain
- Engine: 1.5 L 1NZ-FE I4; 1.8 L 2ZR-FE I4; 2.0 L 3ZR-FAE I4
- Transmission: CVT

Dimensions
- Wheelbase: 2,750 mm (108.3 in)
- Length: 4,565 mm (179.7 in)
- Width: 1,695 mm (66.7 in)
- Height: 1,475 mm (58.1 in)
- Curb weight: 1,200–1,330 kg (2,650–2,930 lb)

The second generation Premio and Allion were introduced on 4 June 2007, with Toyota continuing to offer appearance modifications at local dealerships. These cars continued to fill the gap between the Corolla and Camry. G-BOOK was on the list of optional features. The Premio gained the inclusion of a LED in the rear light cluster. Other changes included the smart entry and start system, a rear-view monitor in color, and a hard disk navigation system compatible with the G-Book mX telematics service.

Four-wheel drive was offered on vehicles equipped with the 1.8-liter 2ZR-FE engine. A 2.0-liter valvematic 3ZR-FAE engine was made available in January 2008, cutting the emission by 75 percent from the level required by the 2005 Japanese emission standards, and also achieving 20 percent better fuel economy than required by the 2010 fuel consumption standards. The transmission was a Super CVT-i. The 2.0-liter engine option was discontinued in July 2020.

Fuel consumption figures for the 1.5-liter models were improved to 18 km/L (42 mpg_{‑US}; 51 mpg_{‑imp}), and the 1.8-liter models were improved to 17 km/L (40 mpg_{‑US}; 48 mpg_{‑imp}), both types now fitted with CVT. From 2 October 2009, fuel consumption for the 1.5-liter models was further improved to 18.6 km/L (44 mpg_{‑US}; 53 mpg_{‑imp}) by improvements to the engine, transmission and alternator control.

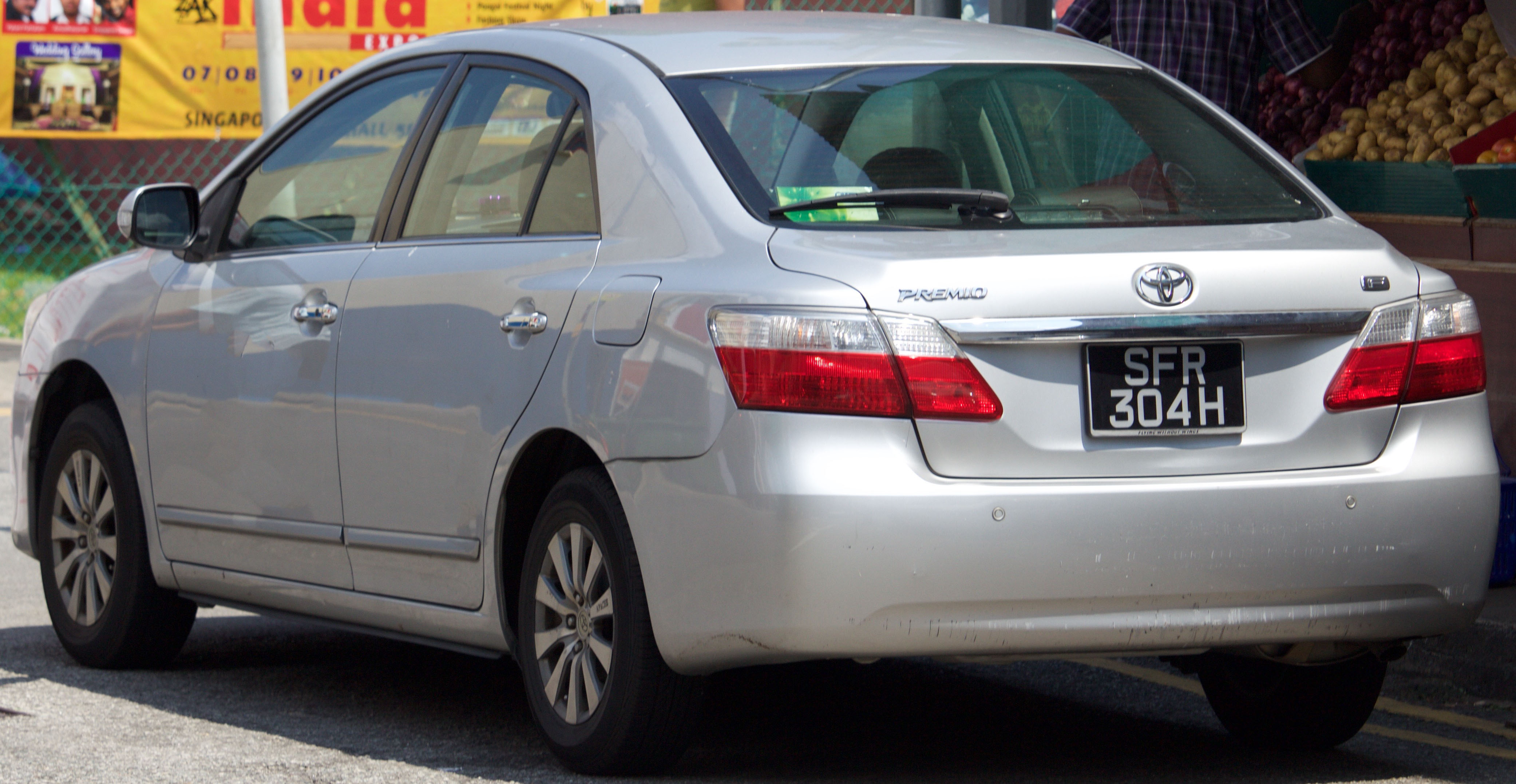
2007–2010 Toyota Premio (pre-facelift)

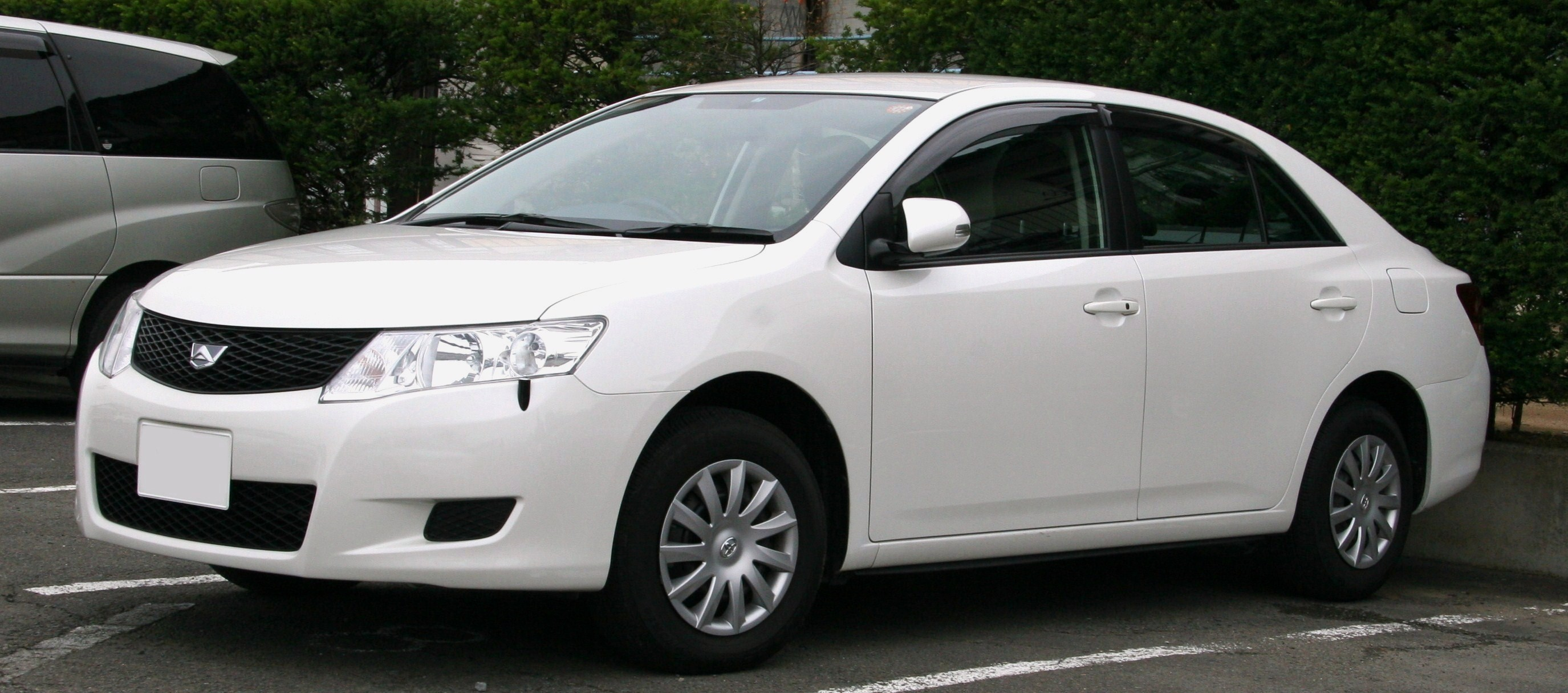
2007–2010 Toyota Allion (pre-facelift)

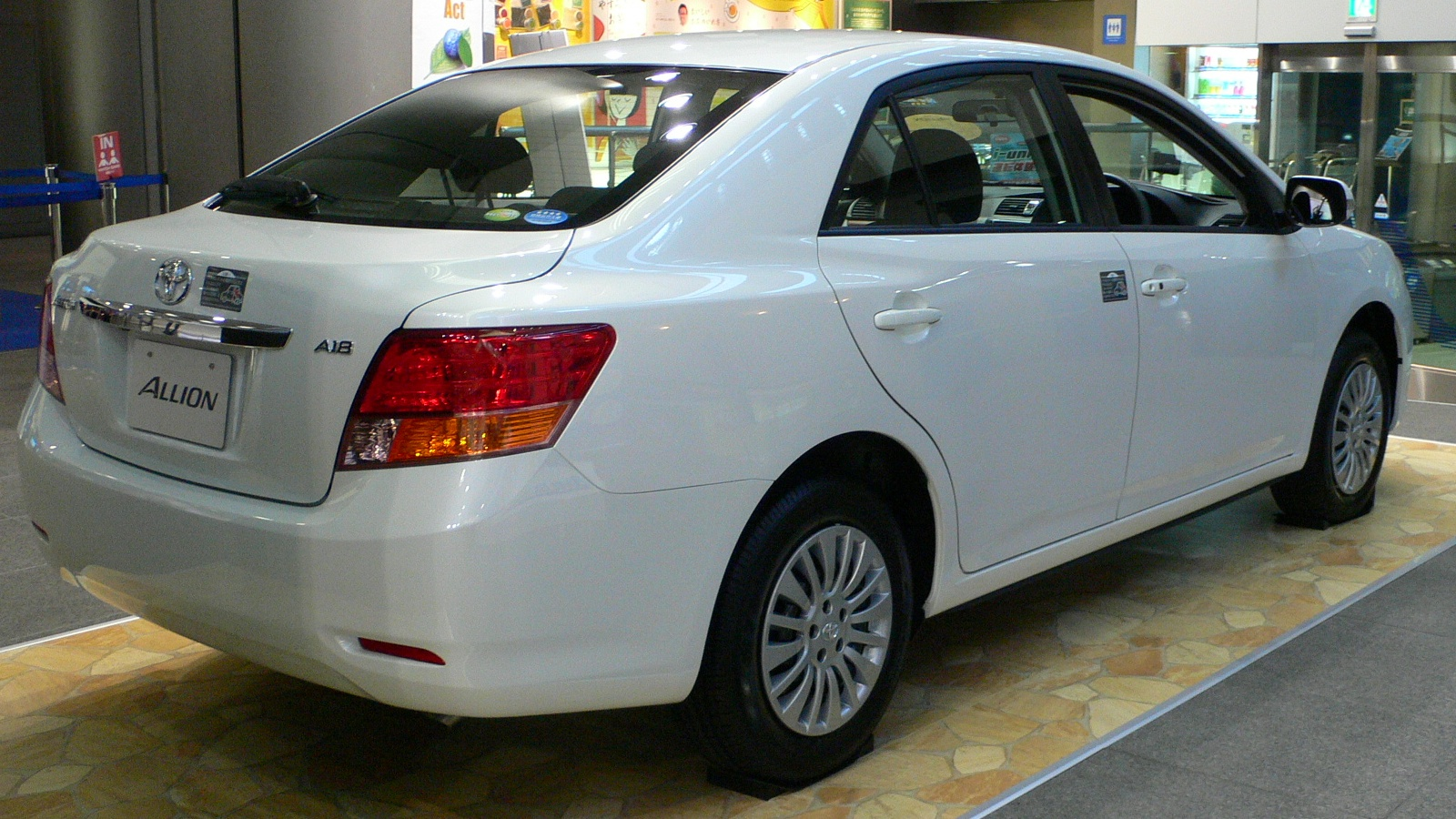
2007–2010 Toyota Allion (pre-facelift)

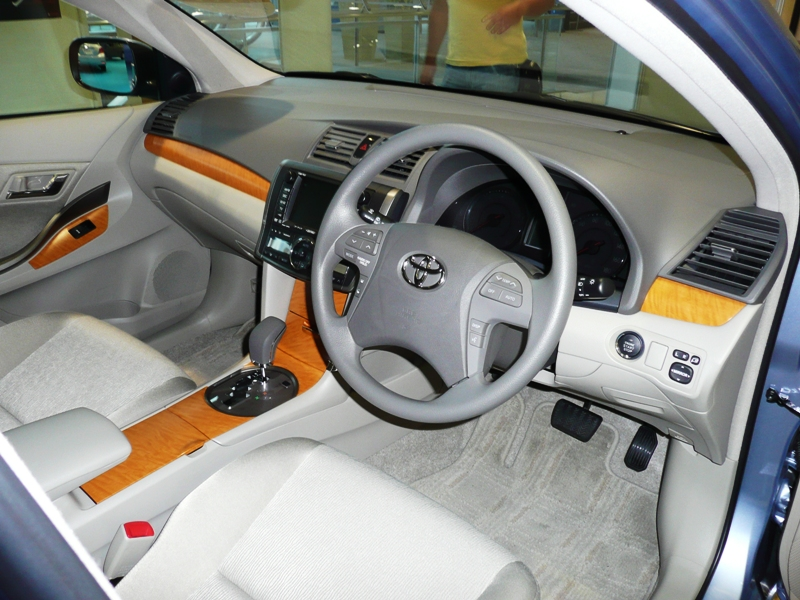
2007–2010 Toyota Allion interior (pre-facelift)

=== First facelift (2010) ===
The Premio and Allion were revised on 20 April 2010 with more aggressive and sharper looking headlights and twin LED tail lights with the interior remaining somewhat same.

The 1.8-liter engine was changed from the 2ZR-FE to the Valvematic 2ZR-FAE, improving fuel consumption on the 10-15 cycle to 18.6 km/L (44 mpg_{‑US}; 53 mpg_{‑imp}). In June 2010, fuel consumption for the 1.5-liter models was improved to 20 km/L (47 mpg_{‑US}; 56 mpg_{‑imp}) by improvements to engine and transmission control. The range was made more fuel efficient yet in December 2012, but because of a change to the stricter JC08 cycle testing method, the published number for the most fuel efficient A15 model dropped to 18.2 km/L (43 mpg_{‑US}; 51 mpg_{‑imp}).

Another bout of revisions aimed at increasing fuel economy occurred at the end of September 2019. A stop-start idling mechanism was added, bringing fuel economy up to 18.2 km/L (43 mpg_{‑US}; 51 mpg_{‑imp}) on the JC08 cycle, which meant that the front-wheel drive 1.5-litre version became eligible for a special Eco-car tax reduction. Other changes were made too, including the addition of Steering-assisted Vehicle Stability Control (S-VSC) and a hill start assist, and the addition of electronically controlled active torque control 4WD for models thus equipped.

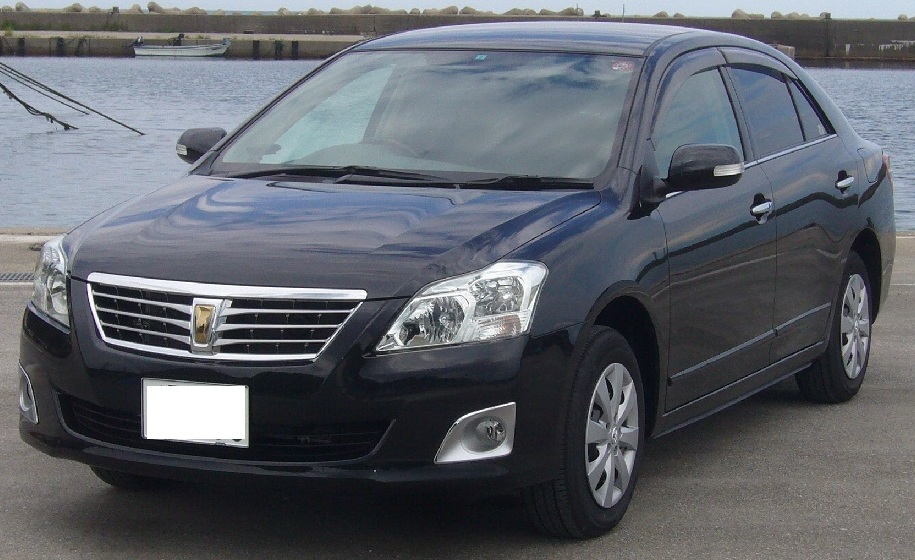
2010–2016 Toyota Premio (first facelift)

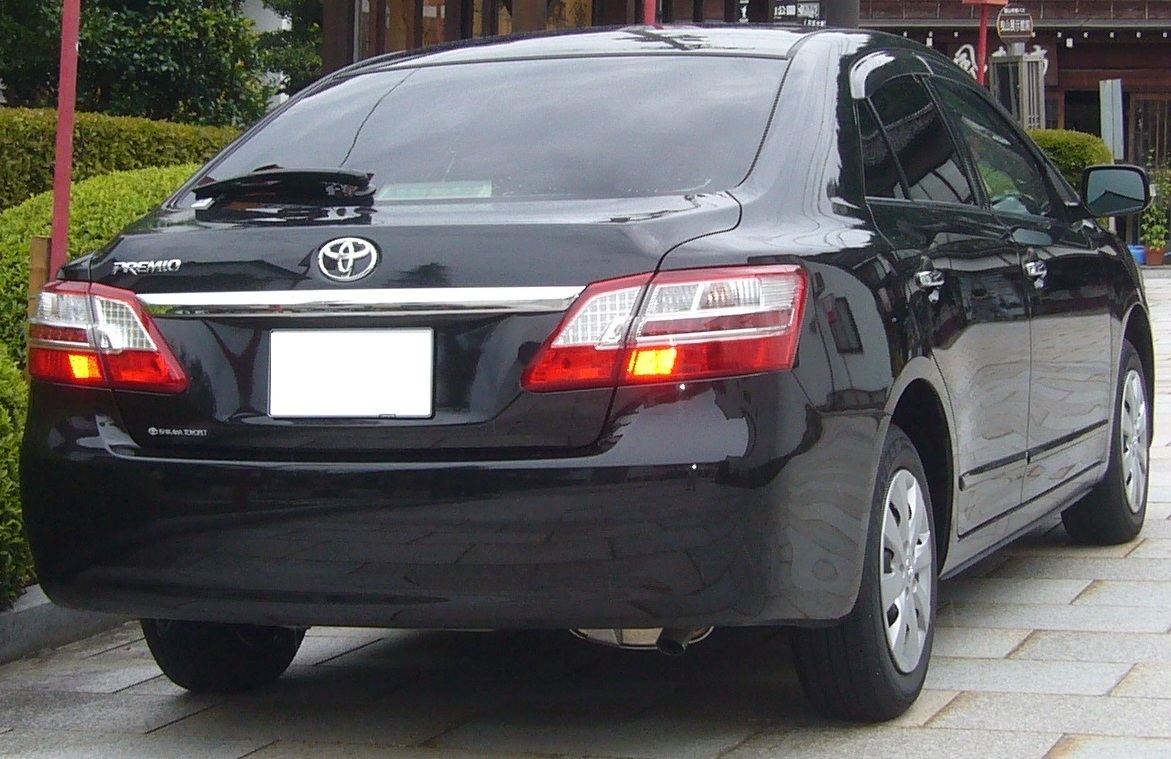
2010–2016 Toyota Premio (first facelift)

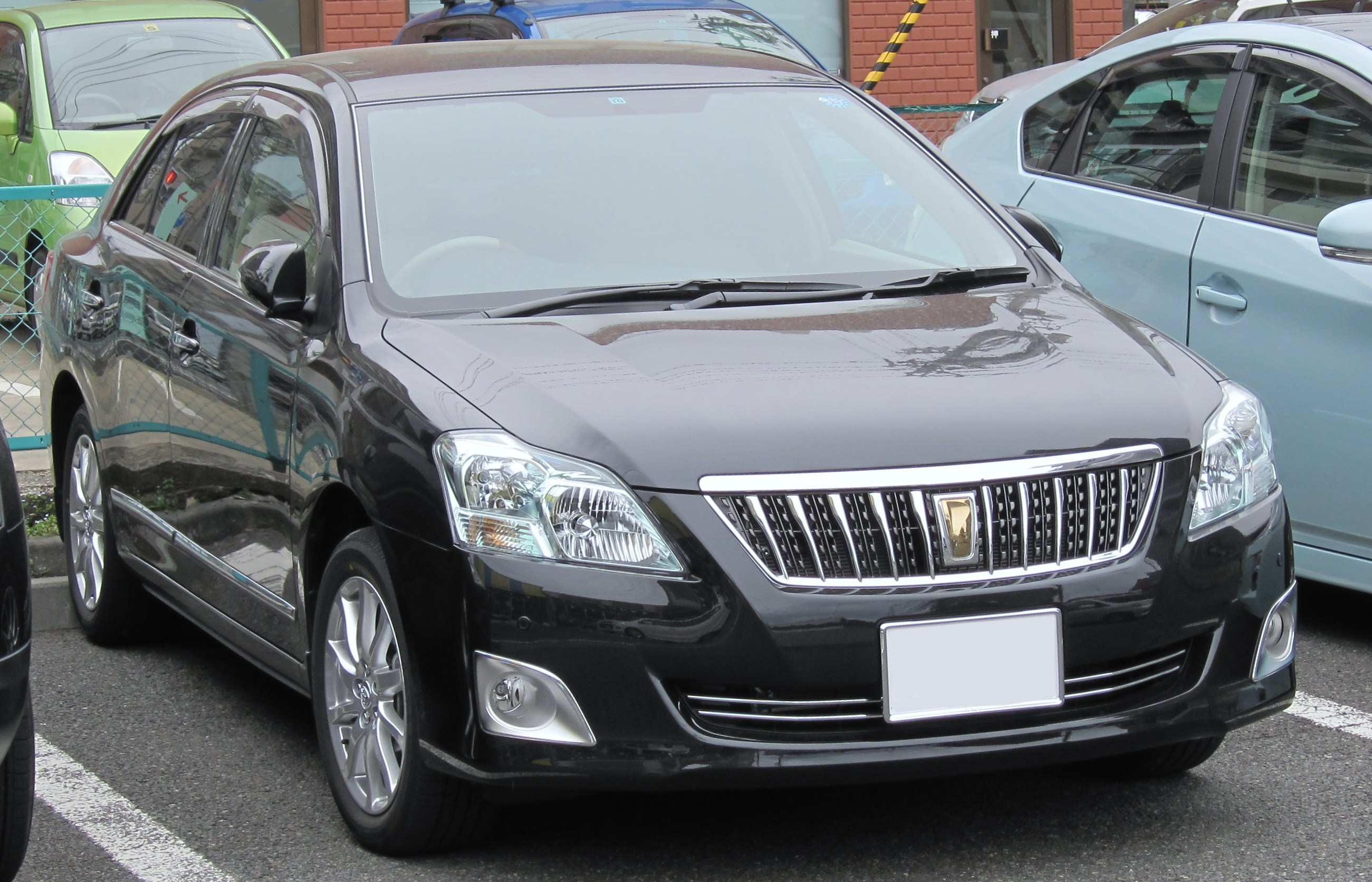
2010–2016 Toyota Premio 2.0G Superior Package (first facelift)

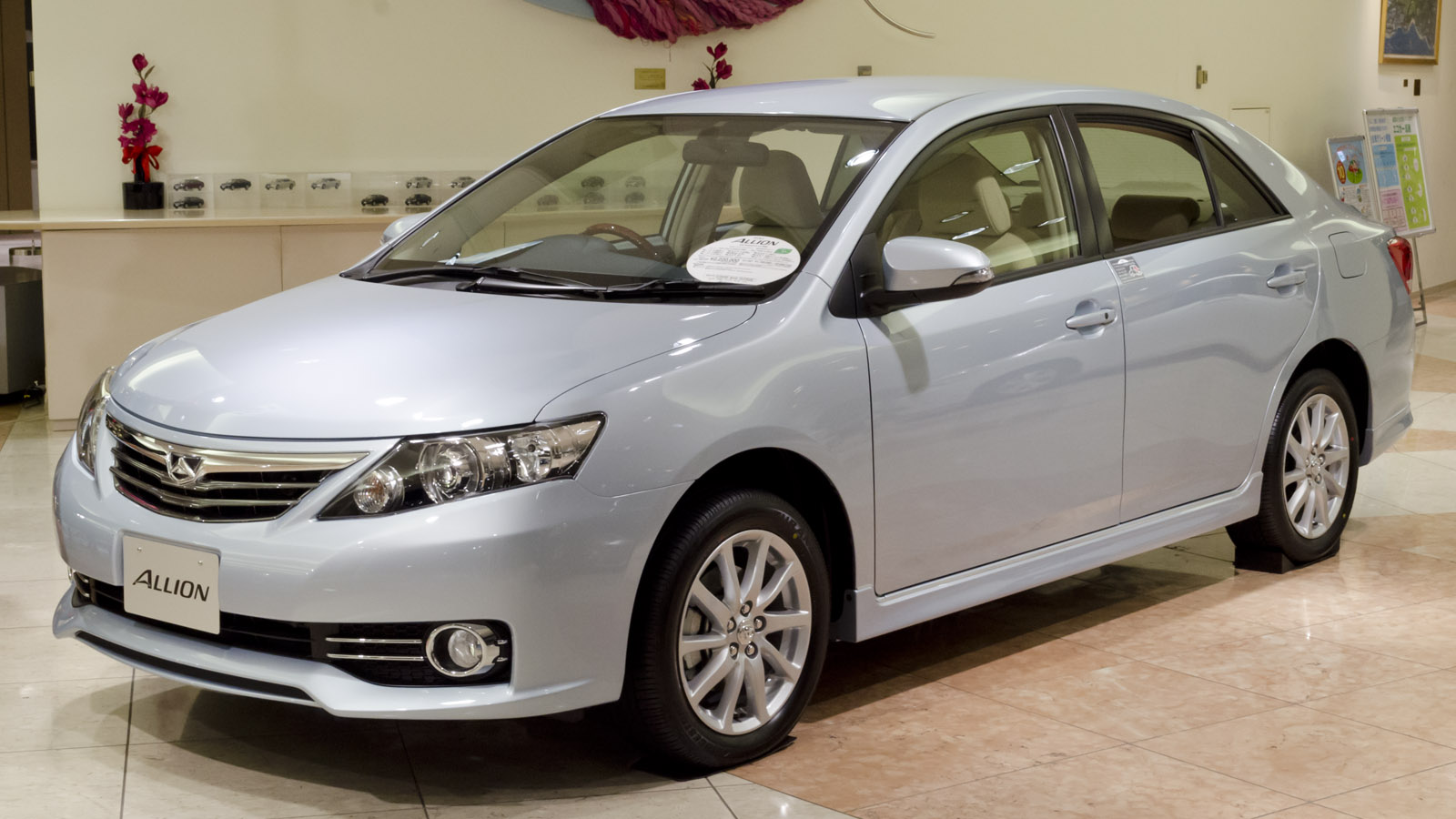
2010–2016 Toyota Allion (first facelift)

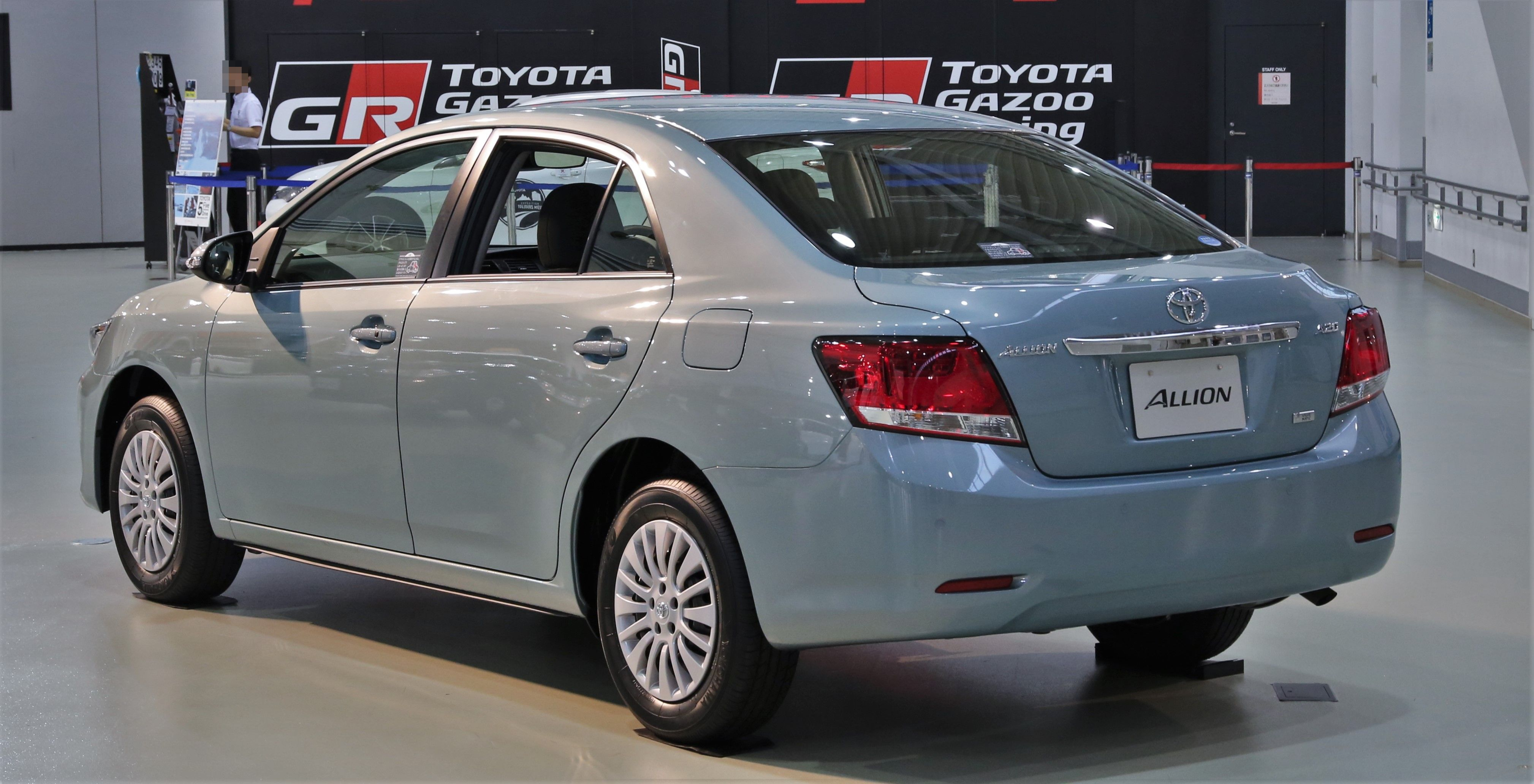
2010–2016 Toyota Allion (first facelift)

=== Second facelift (2016) ===
Toyota revised the Premio and Allion again on 13 June 2016 with a facelift. At the same time, "bi-beam" LED headlights and the collision avoidance system called "Toyota Safety Sense C" were introduced, adopting a styling influence from the larger, more prestigious S210 series Crown. The front clip was now mostly identical, with variation between the two models limited to the grille insert, whereas the pre-facelift version had an entirely different front bumper.

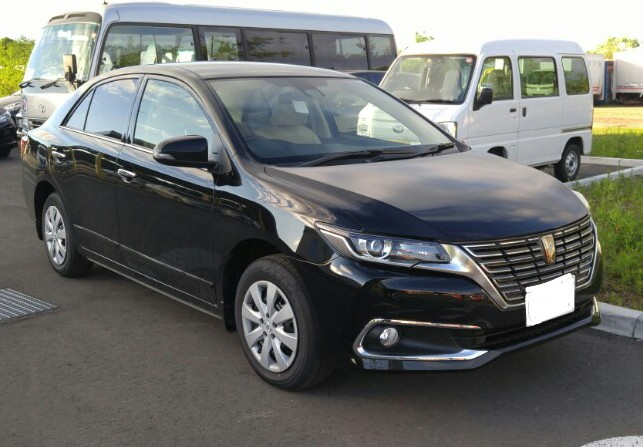
2016–2021 Toyota Premio (second facelift)

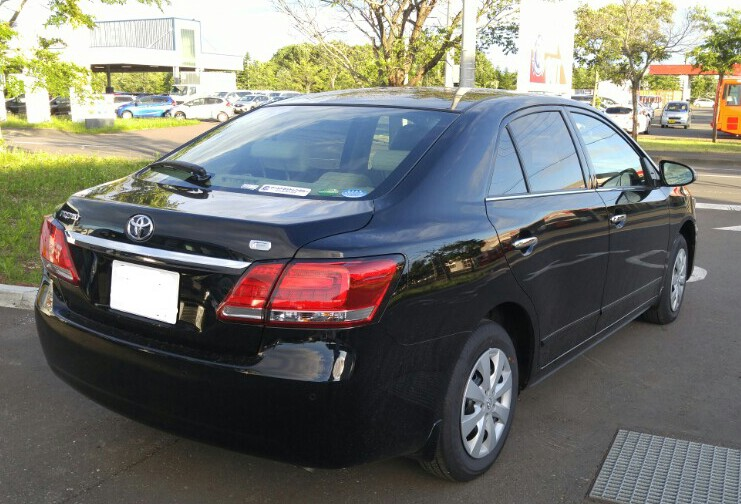
2016–2021 Toyota Premio (second facelift)

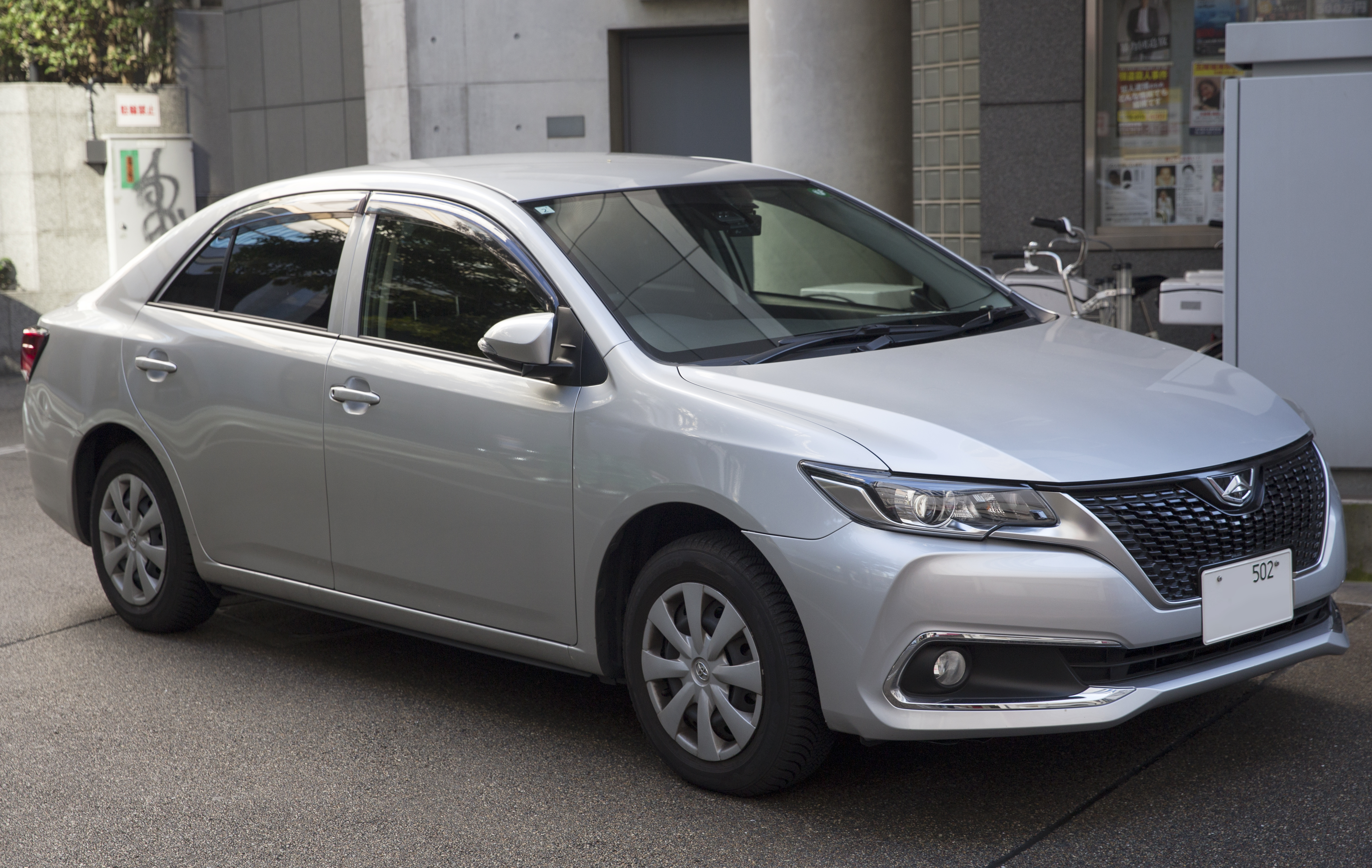
2016–2021 Toyota Allion (second facelift)

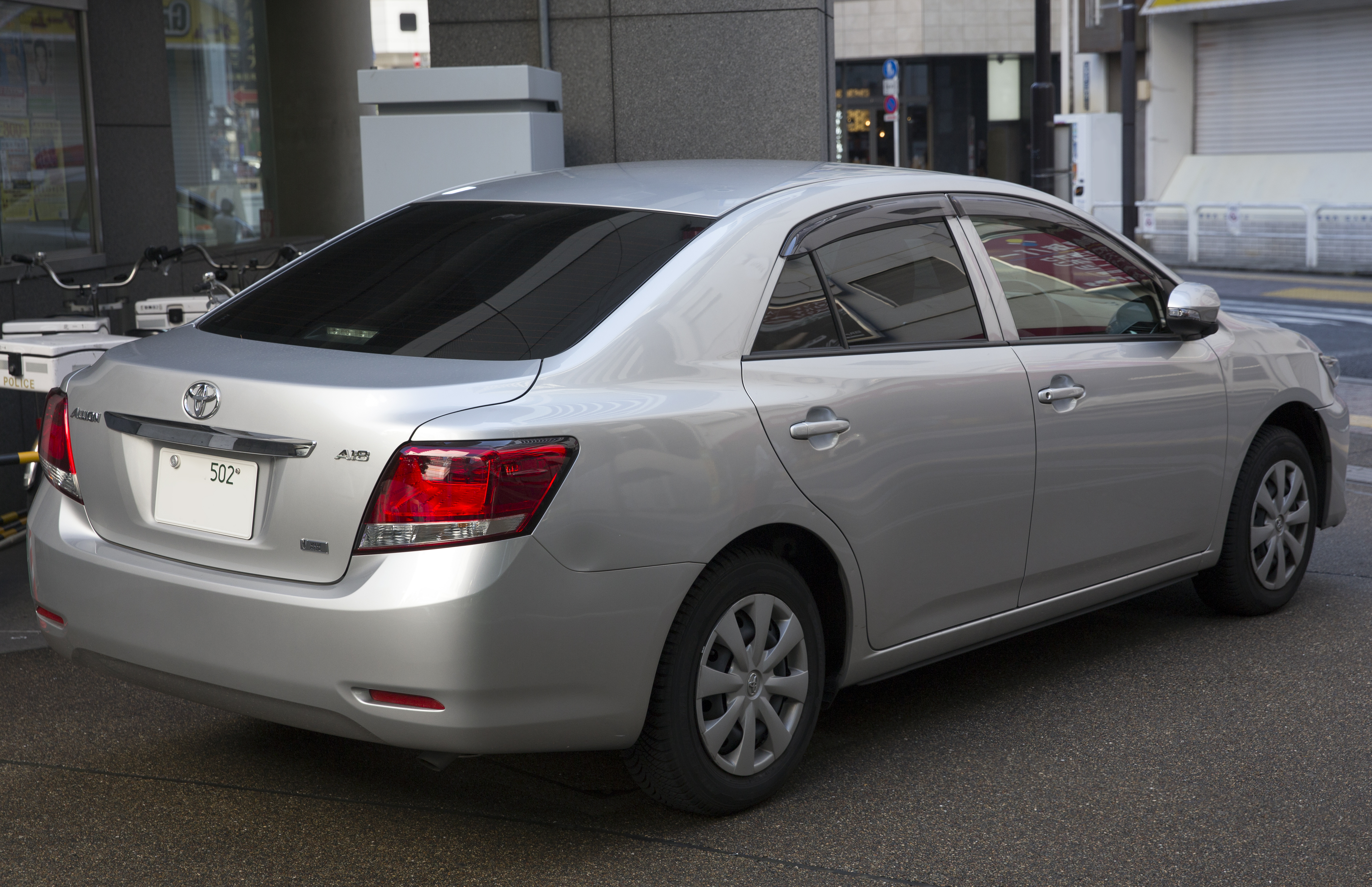
2016–2021 Toyota Allion (second facelift)

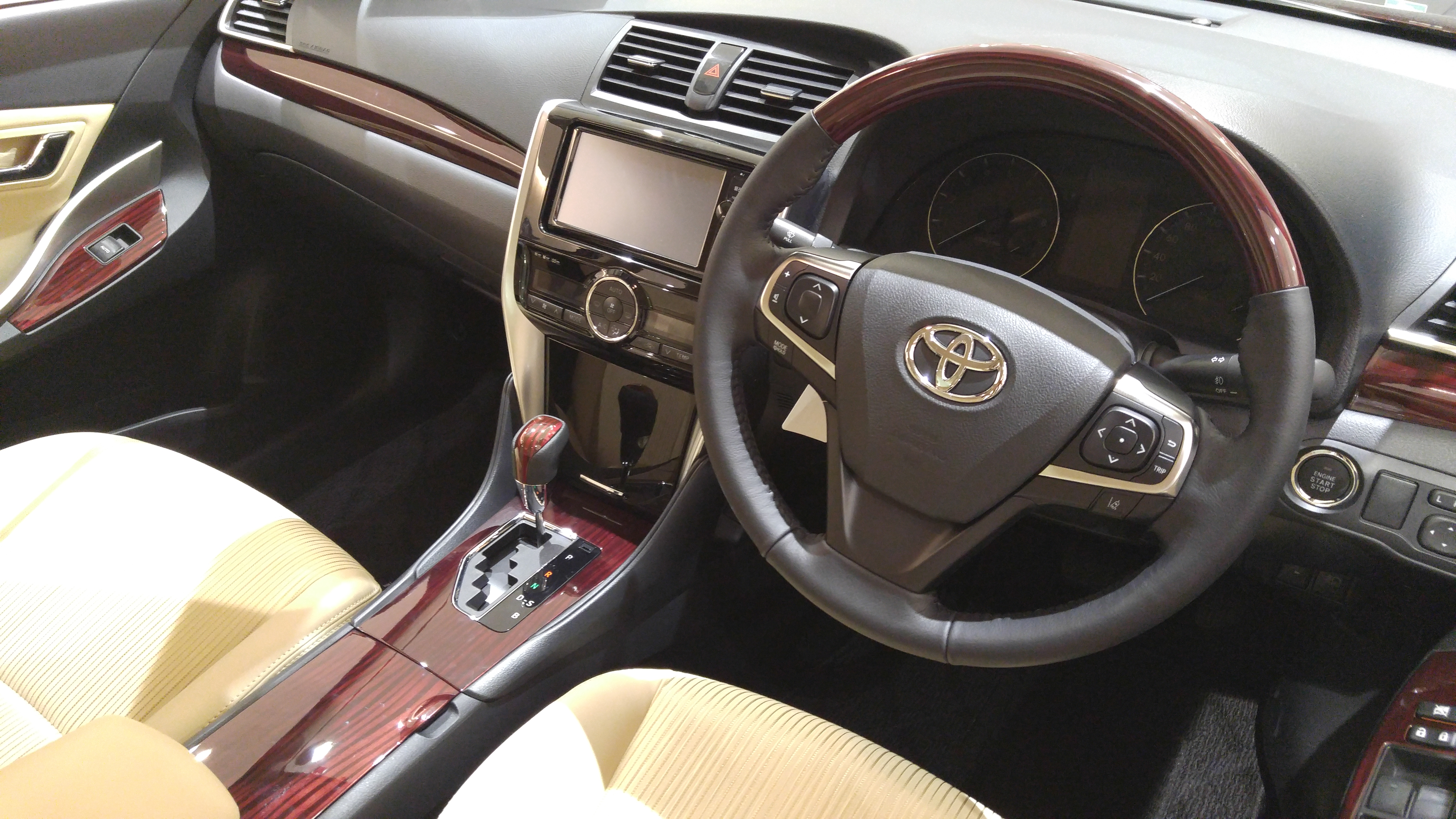
2016–2021 Toyota Premio interior (second facelift)

=== Discontinuation ===
On 1 December 2020, Toyota announced that the Premio and Allion would be discontinued from March 2021. This marked the end of the Corona lineage that was first introduced in 1957.

== Chinese-market Allion (E210; 2021) ==
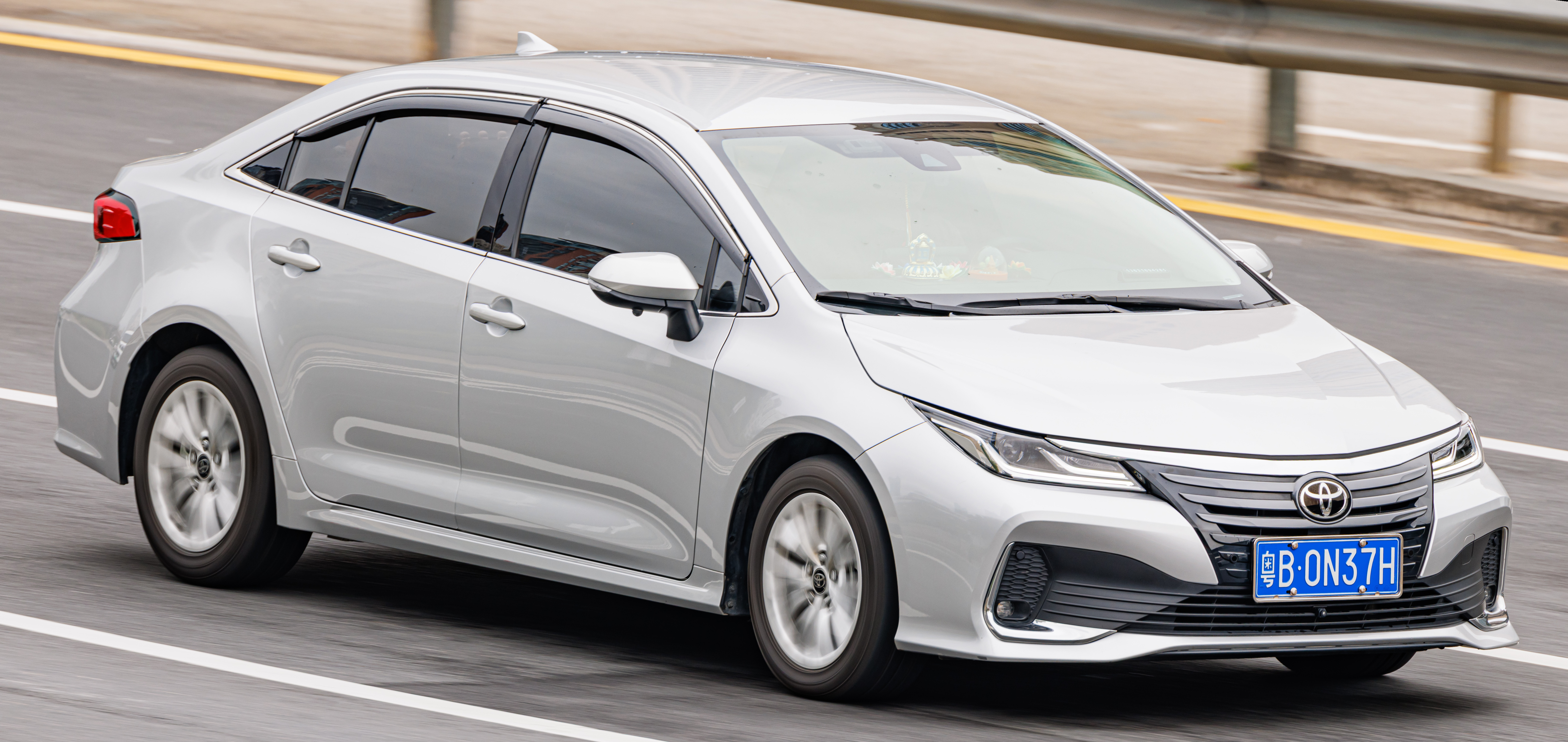
Toyota Allion (E210)

The Allion nameplate is also used as the long-wheelbase version of the E210 series Corolla for the Chinese market. Introduced at the Guangzhou Auto Show in November 2020, the Chinese-market Allion (Chinese: 亚洲狮; pinyin: Yàzhōushī; lit. 'Asian Lion', originally "傲澜" (pinyin: Àolán); the change was made because the latter name may sound offensive to Teochew dialect speakers) was developed by the FAW Toyota joint venture. The wheelbase is stretched to 2,750 mm (108.3 in) or 50 mm (2.0 in) longer than the standard Corolla, while its body length is stretched to 4,720 mm (185.8 in). Larger dimensions meant the Allion slots between the Corolla and the Avalon which is called the "A+ class sedan" segment in China.

== See also ==
- List of Toyota vehicles
