= Toyota Brevis =

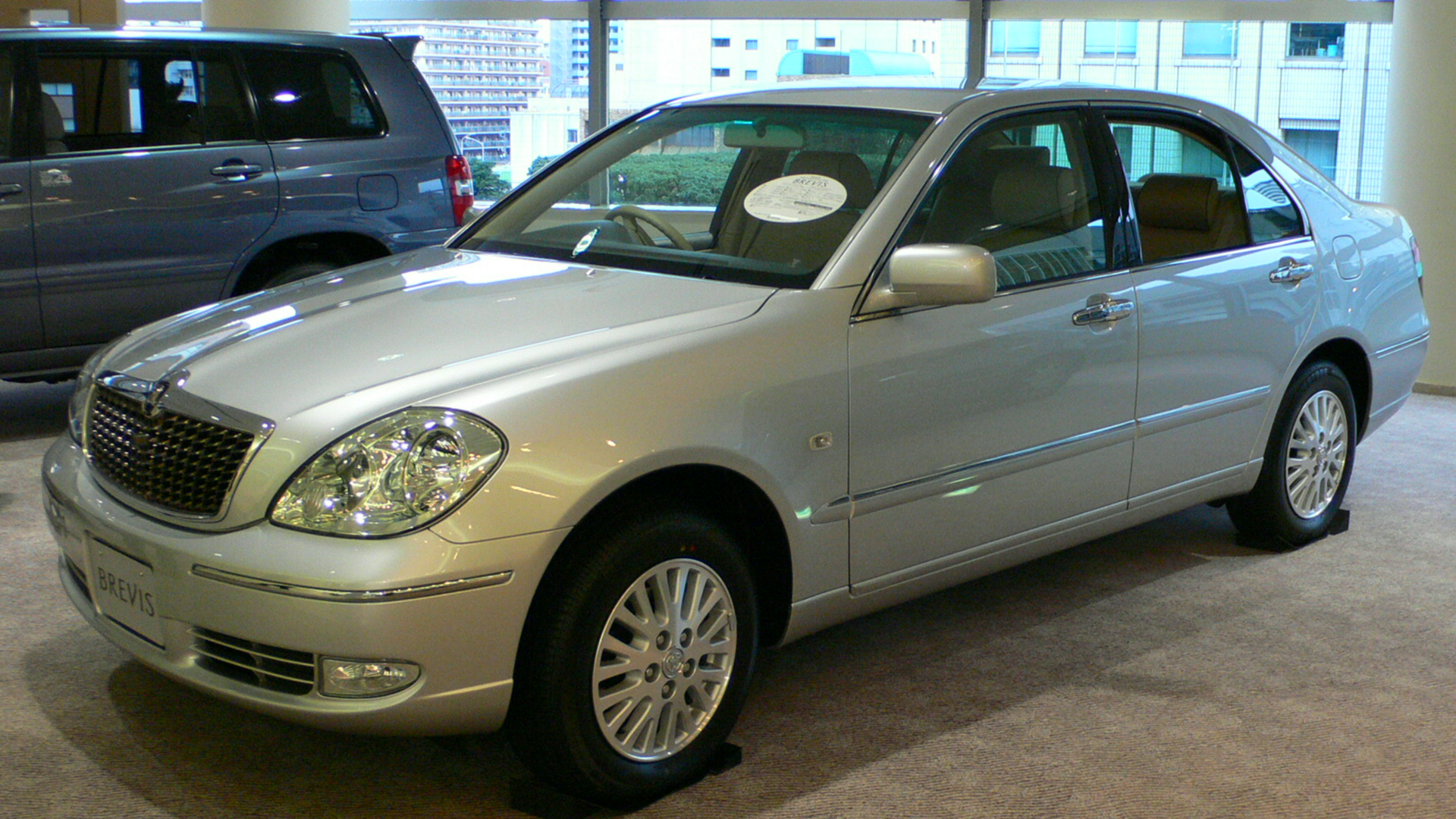

Overview
- Manufacturer: Toyota
- Model code: XG10
- Production: May 2001–June 2007 (33,411 units)
- Assembly: Japan: Toyota City, Aichi (Motomachi plant)

Body and chassis
- Class: Luxury car
- Body style: 4-door sedan
- Layout: Front-engine, rear-wheel-drive; Front-engine, all-wheel-drive
- Related: Lexus IS; Toyota Progrès; Toyota Origin; Toyota Verossa; Toyota Mark II

Powertrain
- Engine: 2.5L 1JZ-FSE I6; 3.0L 2JZ-FSE I6

Dimensions
- Wheelbase: 2,780 mm (109 in)
- Length: 4,550 mm (179.1 in)
- Width: 1,720 mm (67.7 in)
- Height: 1,460 mm (57.5 in) (RWD); 1,475 mm (58.1 in) (AWD)
- Curb weight: 1,520 kg (3,351 lb) (RWD); 1,550 kg (3,417 lb) (AWD)

Chronology
- Predecessor: Toyota Carina ED
- Successor: Toyota Sai (Japan)

The Toyota Brevis is a former mid-size luxury sedan introduced in May 2001, that was sold only in Japan.

Sales started in June 2001. The Brevis was produced for six years before being discontinued in June 2007. The Brevis was exclusive to Toyota Japan dealerships Toyota Store, while its twin the Toyota Progrès was exclusive to Toyopet Store locations.

The word "brevis" is Latin for "brief, a short amount of time or duration".

== Marketing ==
The marketing approach used for the Brevis was shared with a Toyota Vista Store sedan, called the Toyota Verossa, which used a different platform. The Brevis represented the market segment previously served in Japan by the Toyota Carina ED. The width and engine displacement exceed Japanese Government regulations concerning exterior dimensions and engine displacement, and therefore it classified in the larger "passenger car" tax bracket. Two engine sizes were offered to allow Japanese buyers which annual road tax they were willing to pay. The larger engine did offer higher levels of standard equipment and luxury features.

== Description ==
The Toyota Brevis is a twin of the Progrès, which was launched half a year before the Altezza/Lexus IS with a similar platform. Brevis was made with the concept of "Mini LS430". Unlike the Progrès, the Brevis aimed at younger customers, with Toyota saying it is intended to compete directly with imports like the BMW 3 Series and Mercedes C-Class. The Brevis has many styling cues from the Lexus LS 430, and was introduced at the same time as the Toyota Allion. Had this car been sold in markets other than Japan, it would likely have been sold as a model in the Lexus lineup. The price range would have been between the IS and the GS, which puts it in the US$30,000-$45,000 range at that time.

The chassis and powertrain is similar to the Progrès and the Lexus IS, with altered exterior styling and a differently trimmed interior. The headlamps consist of three round type beams. The center console houses an LCD monitor and an alloy-effect sound system which consists of an on-dash CD changer, DVD and MD playback, with seven speakers on the top model.

The Brevis is based on the same rear-drive platform as the Lexus IS, using a double wishbone suspension at all four wheels, with the wheelbase extended to 2,780 mm (109.4 in). In terms of size and weight, it stands between the BMW 3 Series and 5 Series. However, dynamically speaking it can hardly match the European rivals (in Toyota's brand images, that role is left for Lexus to fulfil), even though it rides on double-wishbone suspension. The suspension is set softer than the Lexus, steering is less direct, and its 1,550 kg (3,417 lb) kerb weight also harmed handling agility.

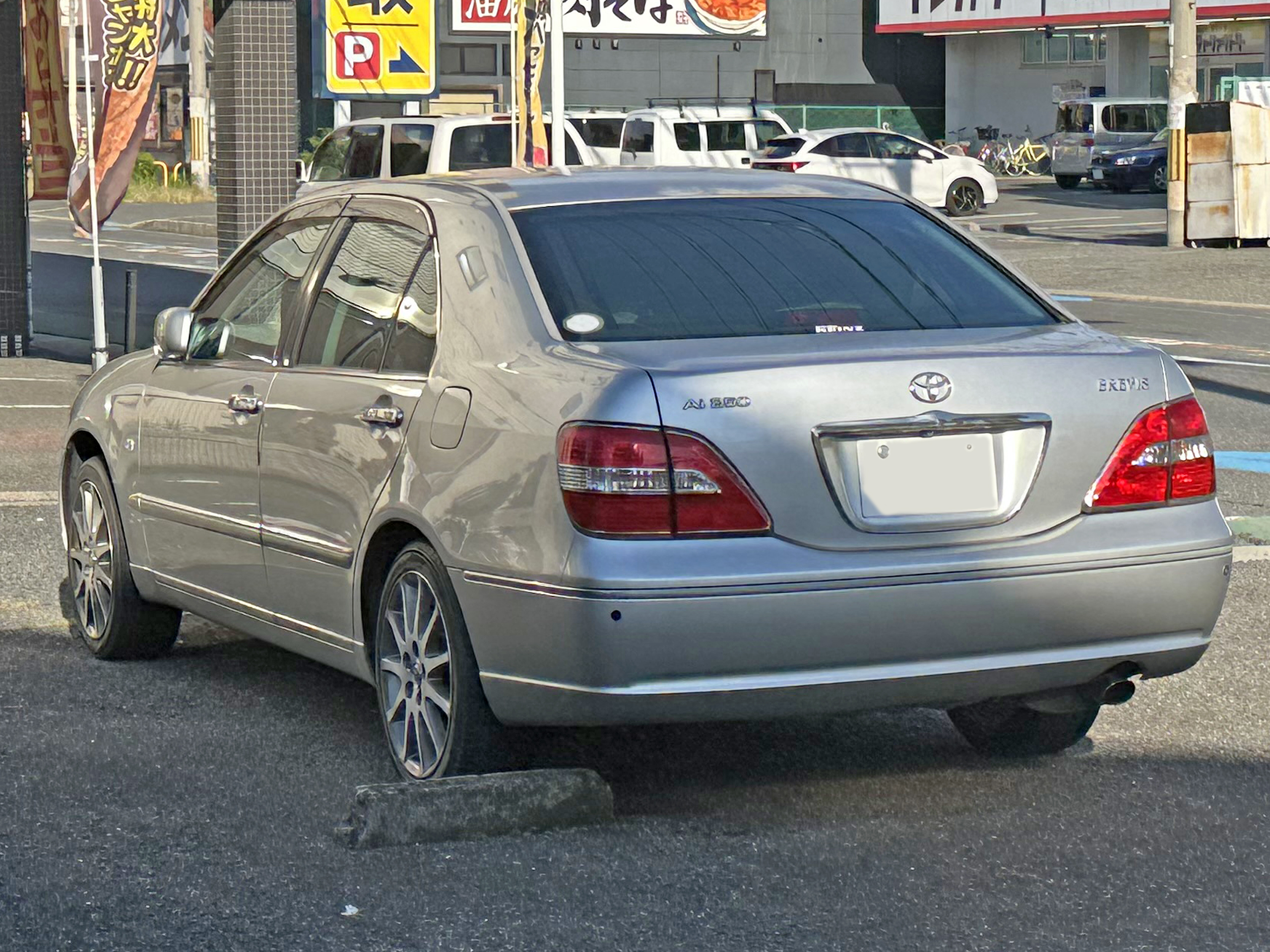
Toyota Brevis rear

=== Options ===
There are two choices of power plants: 2.5 litre or 3.0 litre straight-six (Toyota JZ engine), both front mounted, producing 149 kW (200 hp) and 164 kW (220 hp) respectively. Both are equipped with VVT-i and D-4 direct injection. It comes with 5-speed automatic (2WD car) or 4-speed automatic (4WD car) gearbox options, in which the 4WD option is only available for the 2.5 litre model.

Other options include a power-adjustable pedal, in which pedal positions can be adjusted to suit the driver's driving posture and the position of the pedals, steering wheel and driver's seat are memorized. There is also an electric rear sunshade and a radar cruise control system to ensure a safe following distance to the car ahead in correspondence to the traveling speed. All these are standard equipment. Also included are the Vehicle Stability Control (VSC) system, ABS, and high intensity discharge HID headlamps.

=== Model changes ===
The Brevis was changed in April 2004 as the mesh grille design was adopted for the front grille. Models after December 2005 come with EMV (with color backing guide monitor & window shade corner monitor) and also a DVD voice navigation system for G-BOOK and NAVI.AI-SHIFT (not applicable for 4WD models.)

== See also ==
- List of Toyota vehicles
