= Toyota Corona EXiV =

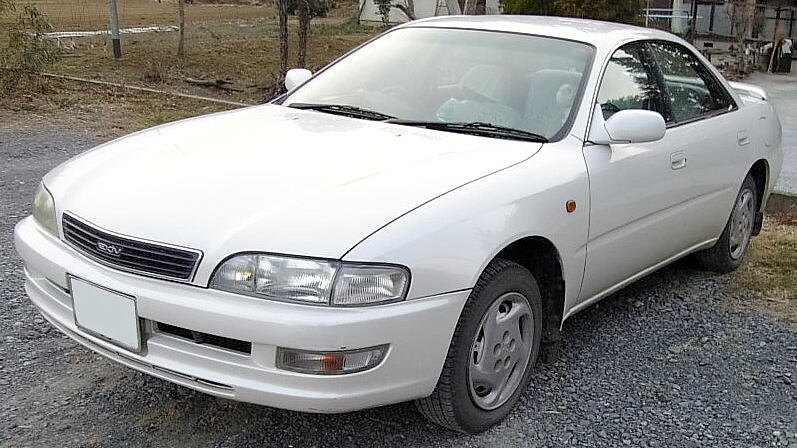
- Facelift Toyota Corona EXiV 180E (ST200, Japan)

Overview
- Manufacturer: Toyota
- Production: 1989 – 1998
- Assembly: Japan: Toyota City, Aichi (Tsutsumi plant) (August 1989 – August 1992); Tahara, Aichi (Tahara plant) (September 1992 – August 1993); Susono, Shizuoka (Kanto Auto Works) (September 1993 – April 1998)

Body and chassis
- Class: Compact car

Chronology
- Successor: Toyota Progrès

The Corona EXiV is an automobile manufactured by Toyota Motor Corporation. Released in September 1989, it was the luxury hardtop version of the Corona and was introduced to emulate the twin Carina ED. The letters EXiV are derived from the words EXtra impressiVe.

The Corona EXiV was only sold in Japan and was exclusive to Toyota Japan dealerships called Toyopet Store locations and sold next to the Corona. It was a clone of the Carina ED and shared the same Toyota "T" platform as the Celica. The Carina ED was exclusive to Toyota Store locations, and the Celica was exclusive to Toyota Corolla Store locations. When the EXiV was discontinued, the Toyota Progrès appeared for the market segment served by the EXiV.

The original Corona EXiV was a genuine four-door hardtop without a B-pillar connecting the rear door support to the roof. Its design sought to emulate a four-door coupé and a hardtop sedan styling of large American and European sedans, resulting in a small, low cabin with longer front and rear ends.

== First generation (T180; 1989) ==
Toyota Corona EXiV
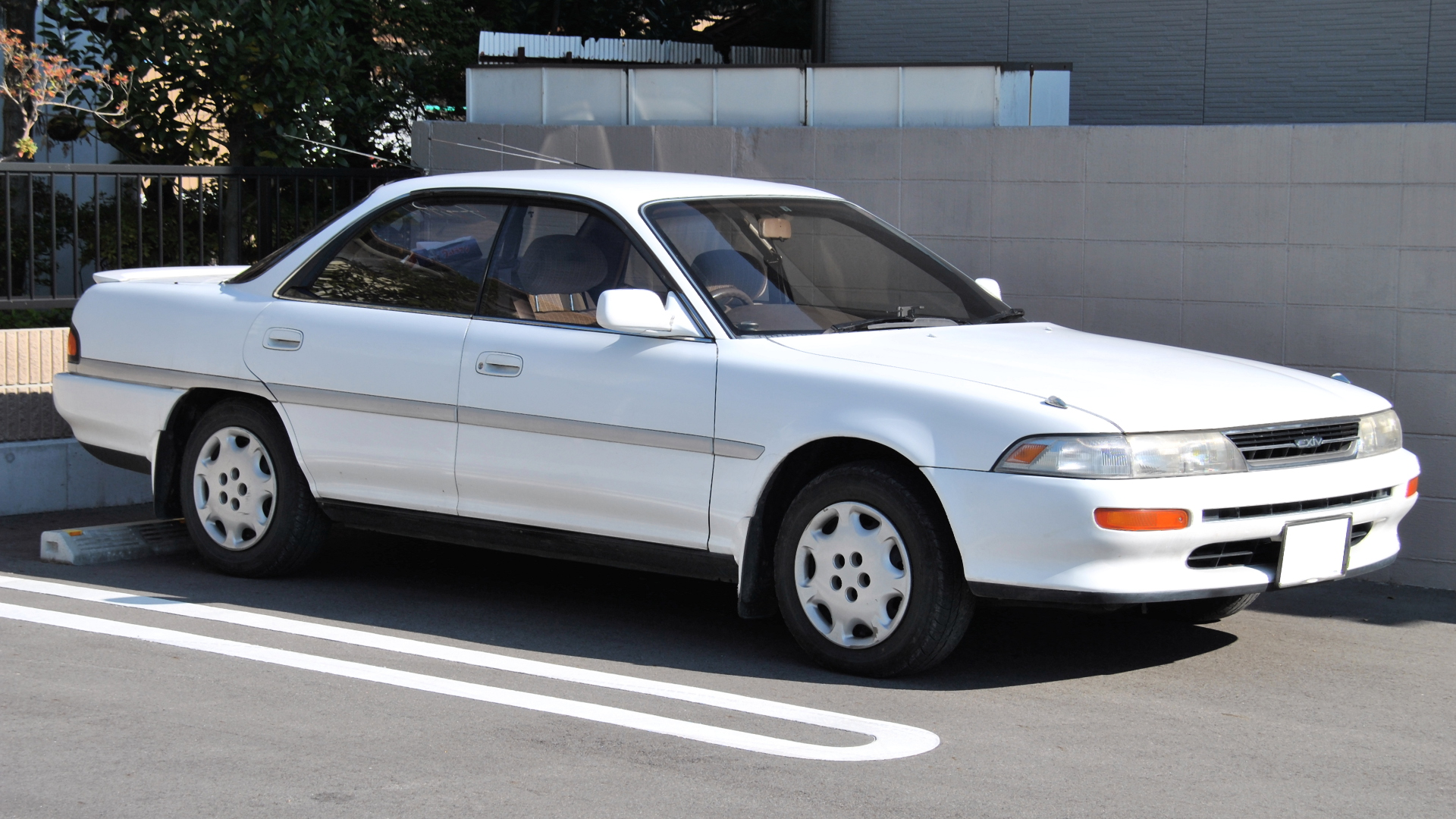
- Toyota Corona EXiV 2.0 TR (ST182, Japan)

Overview
- Model code: ST180
- Production: September 1989 – October 1993

Body and chassis
- Body style: 4-door hardtop sedan
- Layout: Front-engine, front-wheel-drive
- Related: Toyota Carina ED; Toyota Corona (T170); Toyota Carina (T170); Toyota Celica (T180)

Powertrain
- Engine: 2.0 L I4 3S-GE; 2.0 L I4 3S-FE; 1.8 L I4 4S-FE
- Transmission: 5-speed S55 manual; 4-speed A140E automatic

Dimensions
- Wheelbase: 2,525 mm (99.4 in)
- Length: 4,500 mm (177.2 in)
- Width: 1,690 mm (66.5 in)
- Height: 1,320 mm (52.0 in)

First released on 6 September 1989, the Corona EXiV was exclusive to Toyopet Store dealership locations, and the EXiV filled the growing popularity of the hardtop body style left by the departing Corona Coupé. The Carina ED, on which the EXiV was based, was introduced in 1985, and the T160-series sold 264,566 before production concluded in August 1989. The Corona EXiV was available along with the refreshed Mark II, which was available as a sedan and pillared hardtop. The EXiV was only available with four-cylinder engines and took advantage of Toyota's introduction of front-wheel-drive sedans and reduced tax liability based on vehicle size and engine displacement. Toyopet Store dealerships added another luxury sedan to the list on 9 October 1989 when the Toyota Celsior was made available.

The trim levels started with the base model FG, followed by the FE, TR, and top-of-the-line 2 0 TR-G. The FE and TR were offered with both the 1.8-liter and 2.0-liter engines, while the FG only had the 1.8-liter engine. Some of the optional features included a MOMO leather-wrapped steering wheel with matching manual transmission gearshift handle and matching 14" alloy wheels, keyless remote entry, anti-lock brakes, a driver-side airbag, and a six-disc CD player installed in the trunk added to the AM/FM Stereo cassette player. The climate controls were upgraded to a keyboard-type design shared across all Toyota products for easier use.

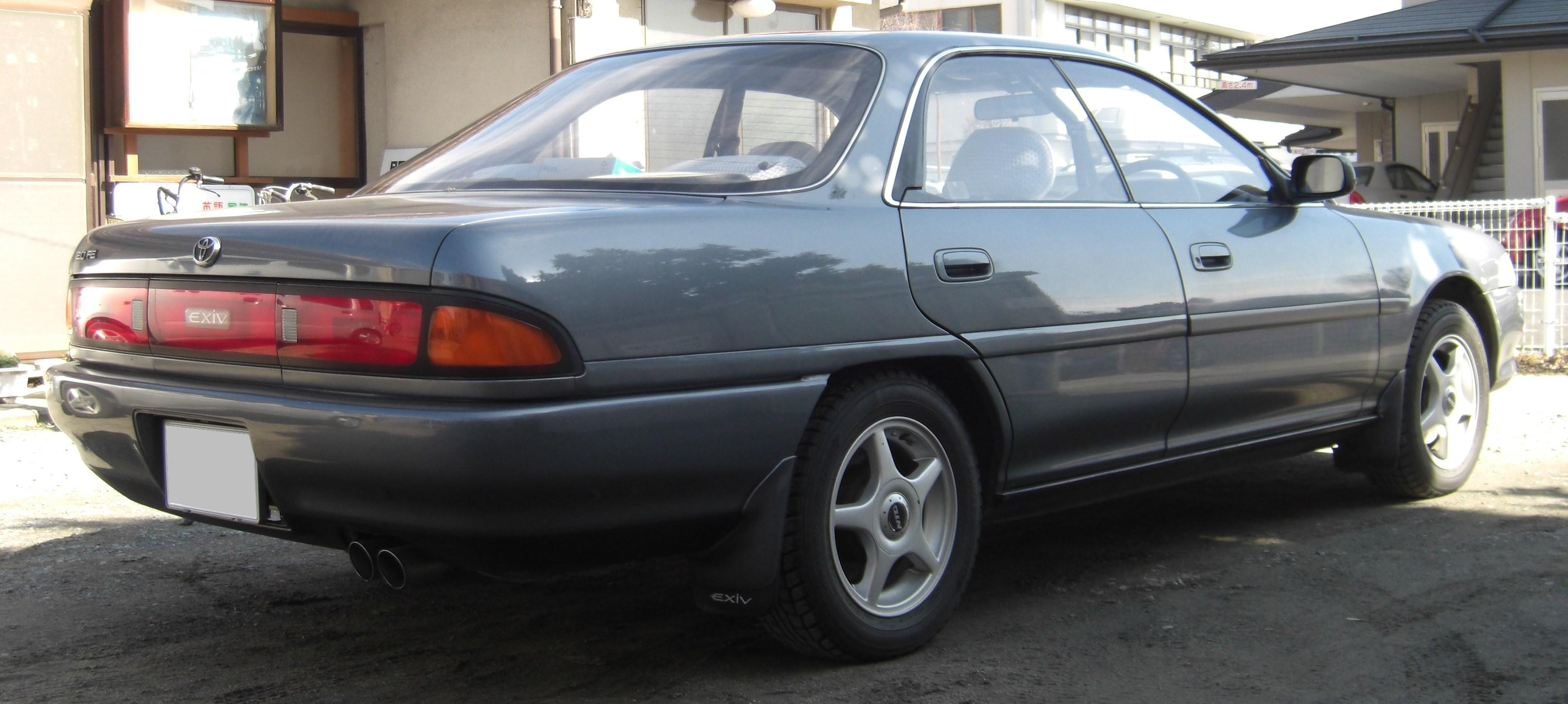
Toyota Corona EXiV 2.0 FE (ST182)

The EXiV introduced an acoustically balanced collection of ten speakers, labeled as "Super Live Sound System," with two-way speakers installed in the front doors, speakers in the lower half of the dashboard facing front passengers, and two-way speakers in the parcel shelf behind the rear seats, including sub-woofers. The total power output was 220 watts. The CD player offered four times oversampling and digital filtering. Diversity antennae were integrated into the rear window, and the electric defroster was included.

To take advantage of the lack of a B-pillar attached to the roof, the front shoulder seat belt, which was height adjustable for front seat passengers, could be detached from the roof support and rested on the front passenger shoulders. The roof support could then be swung up and clipped to the ceiling, giving the rear passengers an unobstructed view.

TEMS was offered on the 2.0 TR-G, TR, and FE with the 2.0-liter engine, while four-wheel steering, labeled as 4WS on the trunk lid, was standard on the 2.0 TR-G and optional on the TR and FE with both engines offered. The speed-sensitive power steering was linked to the ECT-S automatic transmission and TEMS, so performance and handling could be changed for spirited driving. With the 4WS engaged, the turning circle was 4,700 mm (15.4 ft).

- ST180 – 1.8 liter
- ST181 – 1.8 liter 4-wheel steering
- ST182 – 2.0 liter
- ST183 – 2.0 liter 4-wheel steering

== Second generation (T200; 1993) ==
Toyota Corona EXiV
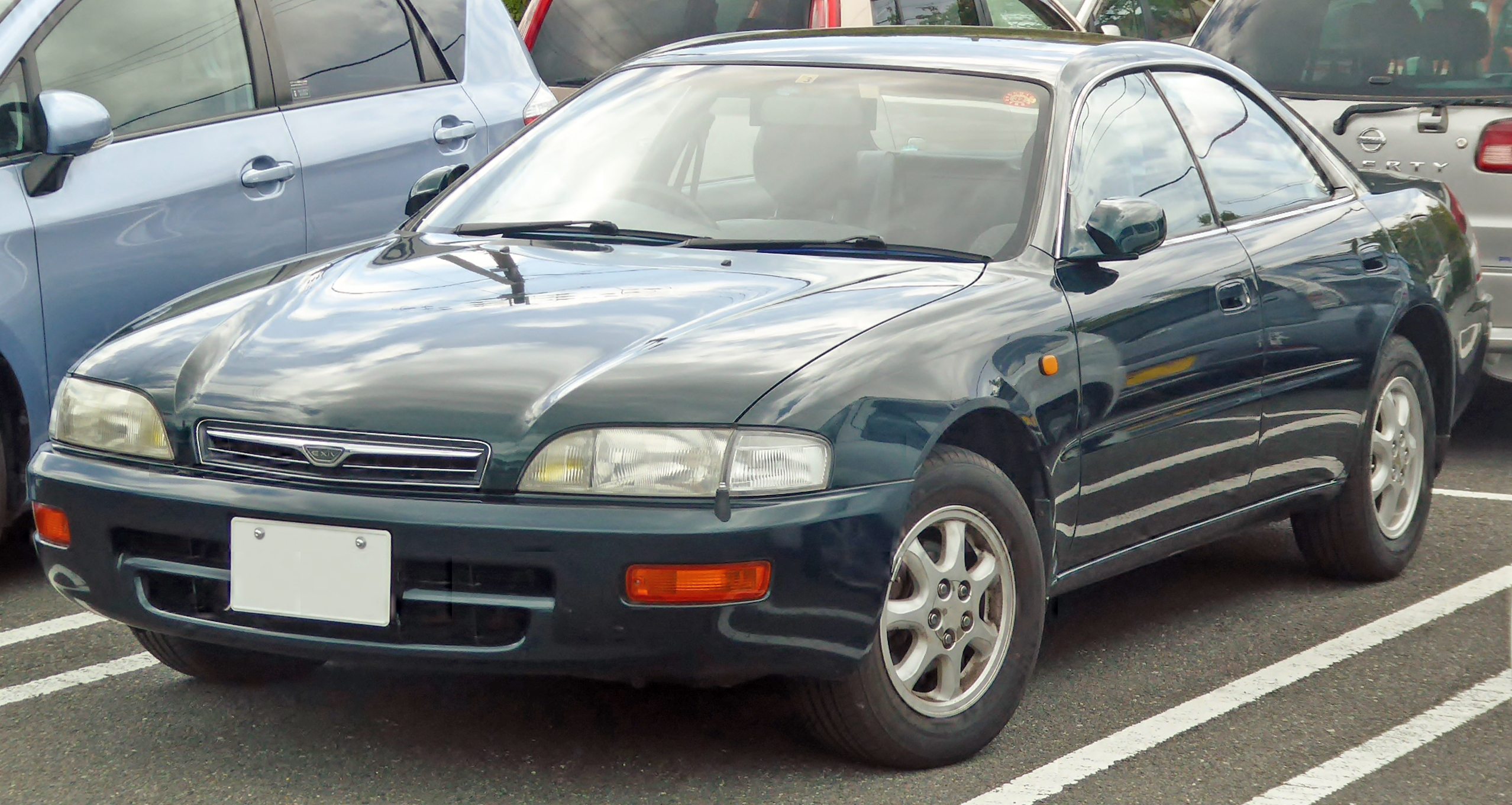
- Pre-facelift Corona EXiV 2.0TR-X (ST202, Japan)

Overview
- Model code: ST200
- Production: October 1993 – December 1998

Body and chassis
- Body style: sedan
- Layout: Front-engine, front-wheel-drive; Front-engine, four-wheel-drive
- Related: Toyota Carina ED (T200); Toyota Curren; Toyota Celica (T200); Toyota Celica GT-Four (ST205); Toyota Corona (T190); Toyota Carina (T190)

Powertrain
- Engine: 2.0 L I4 3S-GE; 2.0 L I4 3S-FE; 1.8 L I4 4S-FE
- Transmission: 5-speed S55 manual; 5-speed E154F manual AWD; 4-speed A241E automatic; 4-speed A241H automatic AWD

Dimensions
- Wheelbase: 2,535 mm (99.8 in)
- Length: 4,500 mm (177.2 in)
- Width: 1,740 mm (68.5 in)
- Height: 1,325 mm (52.2 in)
- Curb weight: 1,130–1,190 kg (2,490–2,620 lb)

Chronology
- Successor: Toyota Progrès

In October 1993, the second generation Corona EXiV was released alongside the Toyota Carina ED and the sixth-generation Toyota Celica. The distinguishing genuine hardtop body style was discontinued, and it was changed to a B-pillar hardtop. Four-wheel-steering (4WS) was still offered, and the new feature was a modified MacPherson strut for the front wheels called Super Strut instead of installing the more elaborate and expensive TEMS. The 4WD model which shares All-Trac all-wheel-drive system with the Celica GT-Four ST205 was launched in May 1994.

The Corona EXiV benefited from the sleek styling of the 1993 Toyota Supra A80, including the interior, form-fitting seats, and the wrap-around dashboard. The "Super Live Sound System," previously introduced, added Digital Signal Processor (DSP) function that allowed playback to simulate four environments: private club, cathedral, stadium, or natural, without any modification.

The trim level designations from the lowest to the highest were 1.8 TR, 1.8 TR-X, 2.0 TR-X, 2.0 TR-R, and 2.0 TR-G. A driver-side airbag, as were speed-sensitive door locks, an in-dash CD player, a MiniDisc player, a retractable four-inch television screen installed below the mid-level AM/FM stereo cassette that was dealer installed, and climate-controlled air conditioning were optional. A passenger-side airbag appeared optionally in June 1996. Other options included remote keyless entry, front and rear parking sensors, and a cabin air filter. TOM'S appearance items replaced the previous MOMO equipment, adding special alloy wheels, leather-wrapped steering wheel, and automatic transmission gear selector, while the manual transmission knob was stainless steel, and vehicles equipped have a badge on the front fender below the all-new side turn signal indicator.

Together with the Carina ED and Celica, the Corona EXiV received facelift in August 1995. The trim levels were revised and became 180E, 180G, 200E, 200G, 200GT, and GT 4WD. Four-wheel steering (4WS) was only offered for the 200G. The top-of-the-line GT 4WD shares the all-wheel-drive system and ST205 model code with the Celica GT-Four, but powered by the normally-aspirated 3S-GE engine instead of the turbocharged 3S-GTE.

To celebrate the success of Corona in the Japanese Touring Car Championship (JTCC), the Corona EXiV JTCC Version was launched in November 1995. Based on the 200GT, it came with JTCC sticker on the door, Recaro seats, and orange combination meter.

From 1995 until 1998, the modified EXiV was raced in the JTCC. For the last year the race was held, Toyota was the only manufacturer that supplied cars, supplying the EXiV and Chaser. The teams that run EXiV in the JTCC were Toyota Team TOM's, Toyota Team Cerumo, and Racing Project Bandoh.

Models offered were:

- ST200 – 1.8-liter
- ST201 – 1.8-liter 4-wheel-steering
- ST202 – 2.0-liter
- ST203 – 2.0-liter 4-wheel-steering
- ST205 – 2.0-liter AWD
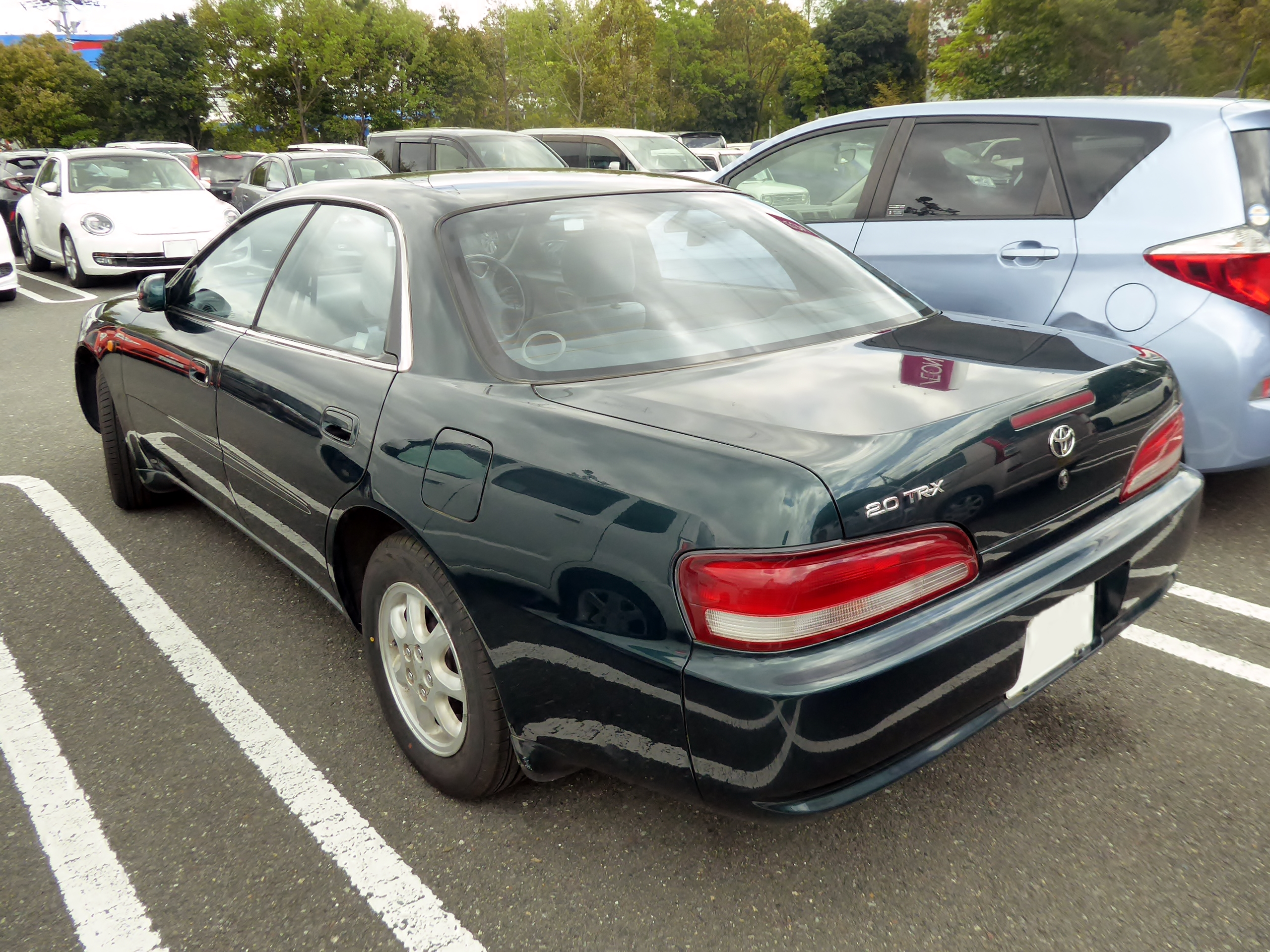
Pre-facelift Corona EXiV 2.0TR-X (ST202)

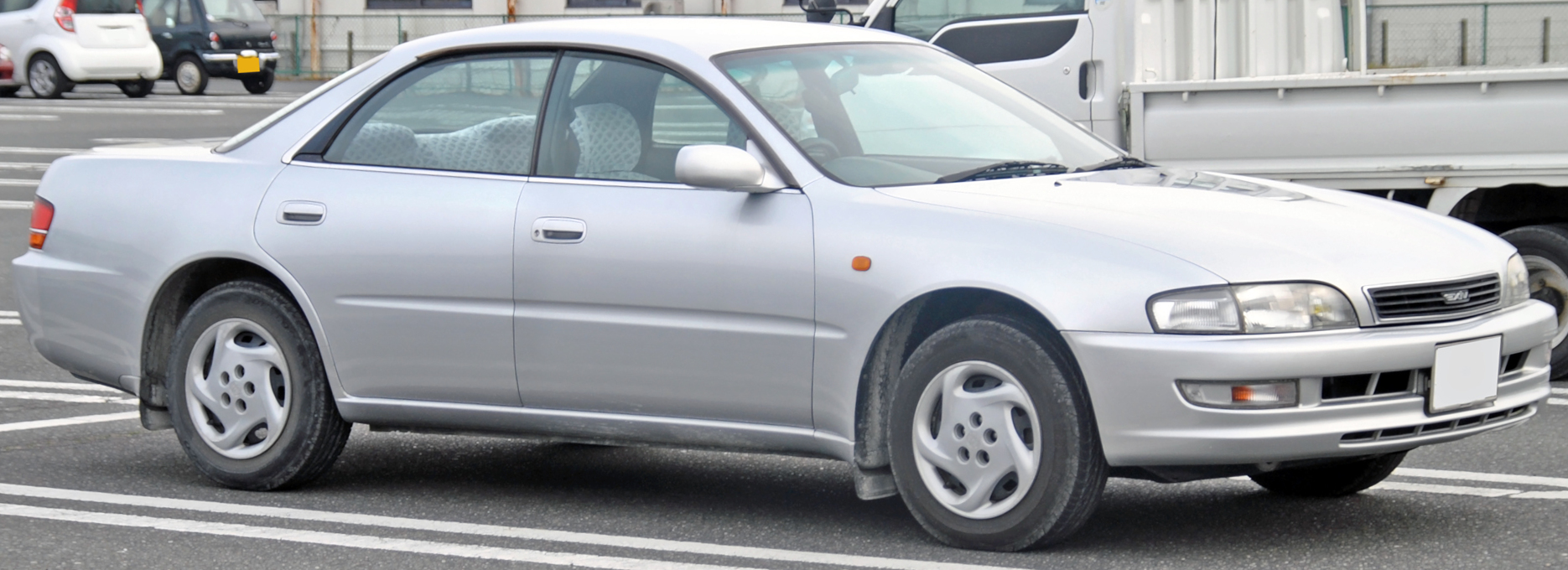
Facelift Corona EXiV 180E (ST200)

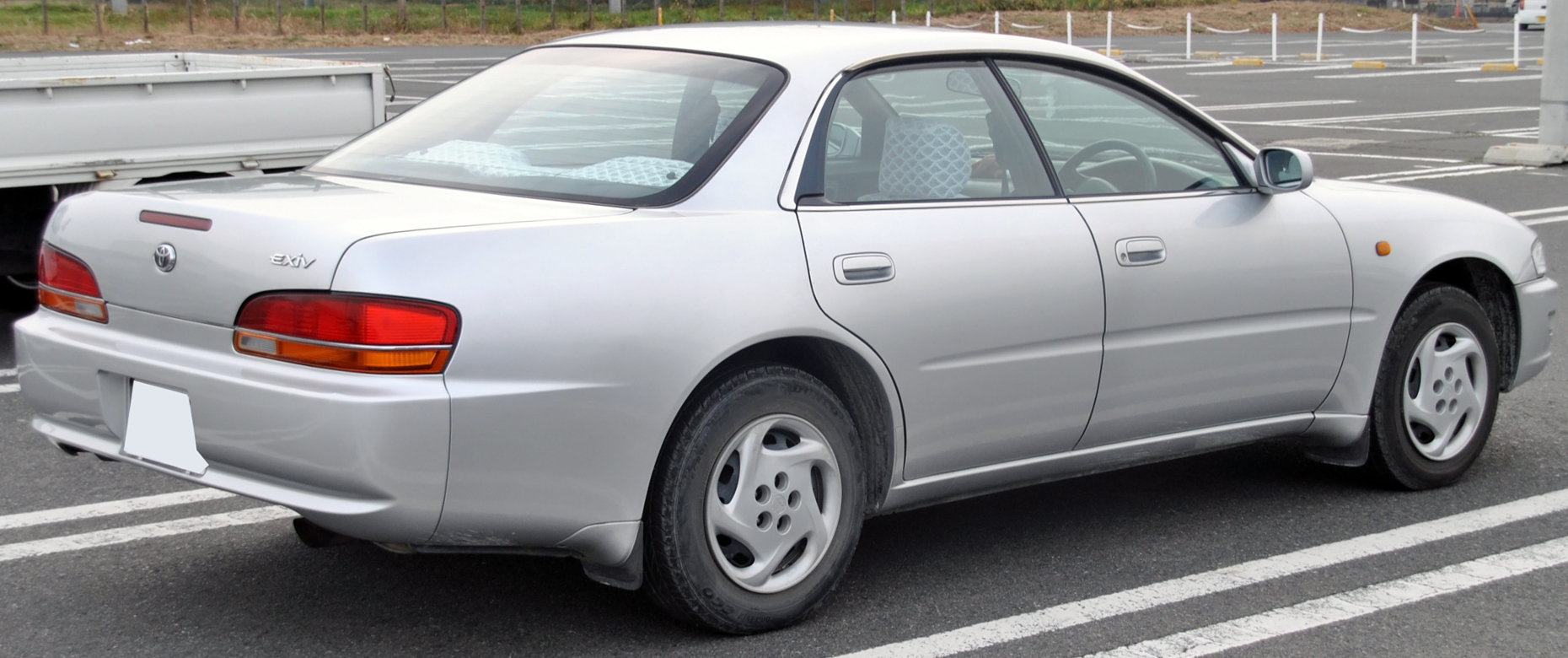
Facelift Corona EXiV 180E (ST200)

== See also ==
- List of Toyota vehicles
