= Toyota Carina ED =

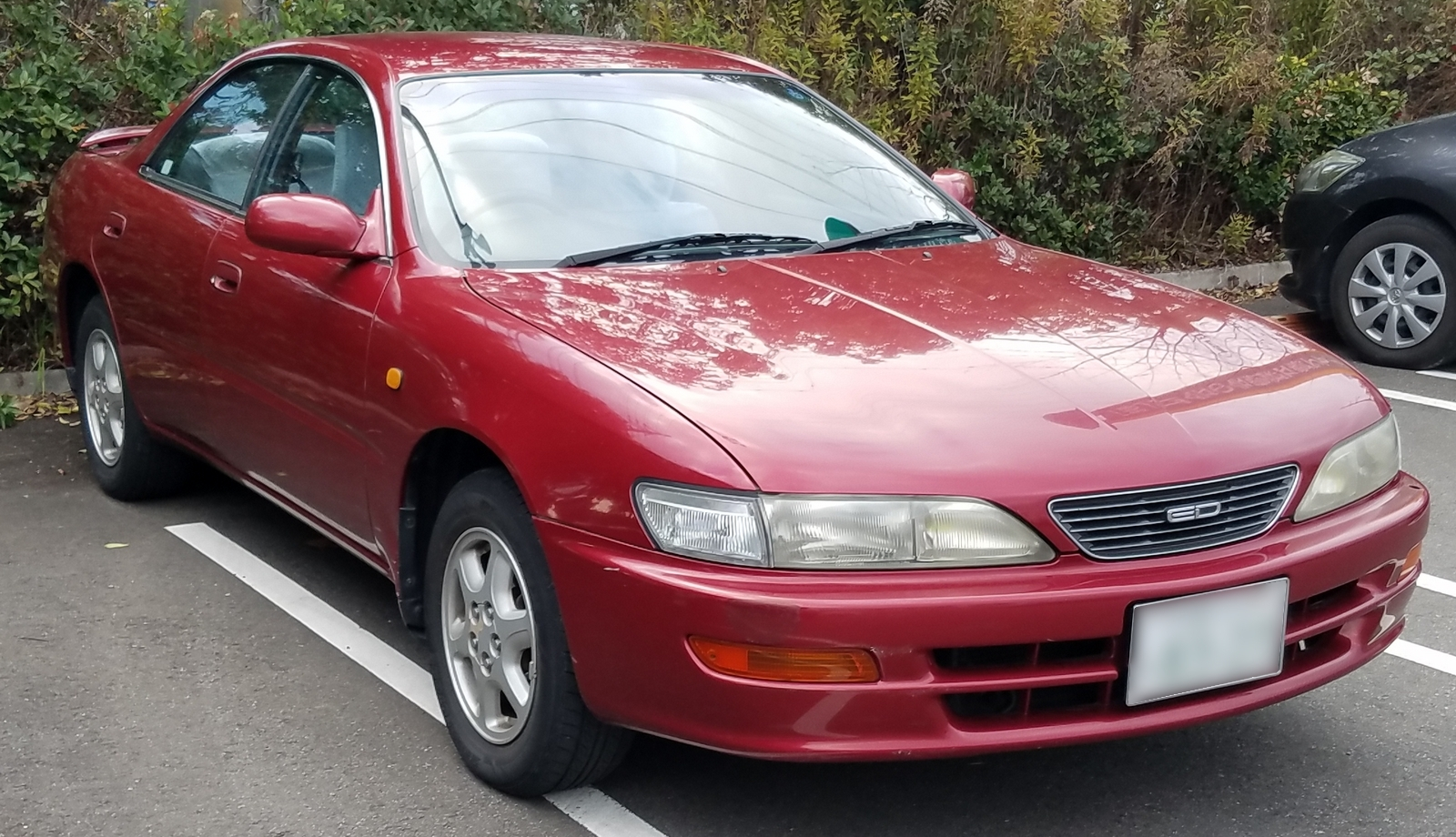
- Toyota Carina ED 2.0 X (ST202)

Overview
- Manufacturer: Toyota
- Production: August 1985 – April 1998
- Assembly: Japan: Toyota City, Aichi (Tsutsumi plant) (August 1985 – December 1987); Tahara, Aichi (Tahara plant) (August 1987 – November 1995); Susono, Shizuoka (Kanto Auto Works) (October 1993 – April 1998)

Body and chassis
- Class: Compact car

Chronology
- Successor: Toyota Brevis

The Toyota Carina ED is a compact car manufactured by Japanese automaker Toyota in 1985 as a companion to the 1984 Carina sedan. It was positioned as the four-door Celica, with a similar focus on luxury found on larger Toyota pillared hardtop sedans, like the Toyota Crown and the Mark II/Cresta/Chaser.

It was only sold in Japan and was exclusive to Toyota Japan dealerships called Toyota Store locations and sold next to the Carina. The Carina ED shared the same Toyota "T" platform as the Celica, while the Celica was exclusive to Toyota Corolla Store locations.

Unlike the larger sedans, the Carina ED and, later, the Corona EXiV were genuine four-door hardtops without a B-pillar connecting the rear door support to the roof. Its design sought to emulate a four-door coupé and hardtop sedan styling of large American and European sedans, resulting in a small, low cabin with longer front and rear ends. The Carina ED went on sale not long before the Plaza Accord was signed, and the Japanese bubble economy took off. The lineup was canceled shortly after the bubble collapsed and the economy began to decline.

The ED achieved huge sales in Japan, and other Japanese manufacturers followed with similar designs, including the Mazda Persona, Nissan Presea, and Honda Integra. "ED" is the initials of "Exciting" and "Dressy". When the Carina ED was discontinued, the Toyota Brevis appeared for the market segment served by the Carina ED.

== First generation (T160; 1985) ==
First Generation
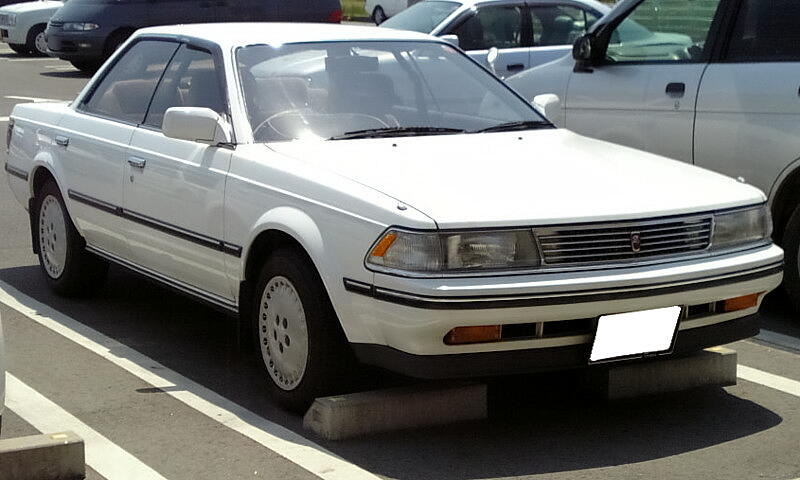
- 1987 Toyota Carina ED 1.8 Type F (ST160, Japan)

Overview
- Production: 1985–1989
- Designer: Toru Kimura

Body and chassis
- Body style: hardtop sedan
- Layout: Front-engine, front-wheel-drive
- Related: Toyota Celica (T160); Toyota Corona (T160); Toyota Carina (T160)

Powertrain
- Engine: 1832 cc 1S-iLU/-ELU I4 (ST160); 1838 cc 4S-Fi DOHC I4 (ST163); 1998 cc 3S-FE DOHC I4 (ST162); 1998 cc 3S-GELU DOHC I4 (ST162)
- Transmission: 5-speed S55 manual; 4-speed A140E automatic

Dimensions
- Wheelbase: 2,525 mm (99.4 in)
- Length: 4,475 mm (176.2 in)
- Width: 1,690 mm (67 in)
- Height: 1,310 mm (52 in)
- Curb weight: 1,130–1,435 kg (2,491–3,164 lb)

The first generation was a new design direction, emphasizing styling and comfort over practicality and economy. It was introduced in May 1985, and sales began in August. The Celica platform was used, and attention was placed on handling, style and performance. When the Carina ED became available, the series T160 sold 264,566 before production concluded in August 1989.

When the first Carina was introduced in 1970, it was identified as a four-door Celica but sold at a different Toyota Japan dealership called Toyota Store as a Corona-sized sedan with a performance-enhanced image of the Celica and as a smaller companion to the Crown. The Corona was exclusive to Toyopet Store, and the Celica was exclusive to Toyota Corolla Store.

The introduction of the Carina ED represented a renewed emphasis on solidifying the performance reputation of the Celica, once again as a four-door version but using a genuine hardtop body style that was discontinued in 1981 when the Carina and Celica hardtop coupes were no longer offered. To take advantage of the lack of a B-pillar attached to the roof, the front shoulder seat belt could be detached from the roof support and rested on the front passenger shoulders, and the roof support could then be swung up and clipped to the ceiling, giving the rear passengers an unobstructed view.

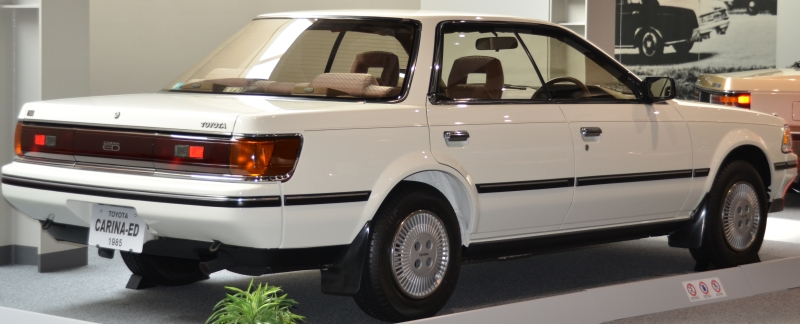
Toyota Carina ED 1.8 Type X (ST160, Japan)

The hardtop sedan appearance was offered to consumers who wanted the luxurious approach offered by the pillared hardtop sedan Crown, as well as the Mark II, Chaser and Cresta but the Carina ED was offered at a lower price and reduced tax liability based on the vehicles size and engine displacement. The exclusivity of a genuine hardtop sedan set the Carina ED apart from other more expensive Toyota sedans, and sales reflected the effort. The Carina ED's appearance is similar to the 1986 Camry Prominent that appeared in August, which also used a pillared hardtop and front wheel drive. The pillared hardtop approach was also used on the yet smaller Corolla/Sprinter platform, called the Corolla Ceres and the Sprinter Marino.

Toyota wanted to establish that the Carina ED was "a fun to drive four-door Celica." To emphasize this, they installed the performance suspension, using the marketing terminology PEGASUS (Precision Engineered Geometrically Advanced SUSpension) introduced on the Toyota Soarer in 1983. The Carina ED came with MacPherson struts with an anti-sway bar and strut tower brace, while the rear employs MacPherson struts with a trailing link and twin lateral links per side, plus an anti-sway bar.

The initial lineup offered two 1.8-liter engines, one twin-cam 16-valve 2.0, and five trim packages. The entry-level Type F and Type L came with the 1S-iLU and had throttle body fuel injection. In contrast, the Type X and Type S used the 1S-ELU with multi-point fuel injection, as did the top-of-the-line 3S-GELU on the top-level Type G and G-Limited. Power outputs were initially in JIS Gross, and the three engines were rated at 105, 115 and 160 PS (77, 85 and 118 kW). With the later net rating, power figures drop down to 89, 98 and 140 PS (65, 72 and 103 kW) respectively. Fog lamps were made standard August 1987. The 1S-ELU engine was replaced by the 2.0-liter 3S-FE, producing 120 PS (88 kW) JIS net. In May 1988 the 1S-iLU was replaced by the 1.8-liter 4S-Fi, with 105 PS (77 kW) JIS net; this meant that the engine lineup now consisted entirely twin cams. The transmissions offered were the same as found in the Celica, with the four-speed automatic offered with ECT-S technology, offering overdrive and the ability to change the shift points for economy or power performance.

The luxury features included with the Celica 2000GT-R were also offered on the Carina ED Type X, including the digital dashboard, automatic climate control, cruise control, eight-way power-adjustable front seats with lumbar support and side bolsters, four-way adjustable steering wheel, and the AM/FM stereo cassette with a built-in equalizer.

== Second generation (T180; 1989) ==
Second generation
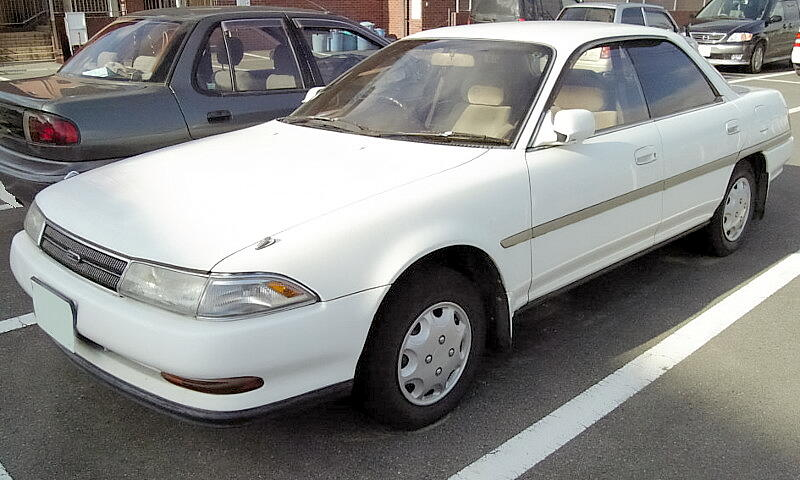
- 1989 Toyota Carina ED Type F (ST180, Japan)

Overview
- Production: 1989–1993

Body and chassis
- Body style: hardtop sedan
- Layout: Front-engine, front-wheel-drive
- Related: Toyota Corona EXiV (T180); Toyota Celica (T180); Toyota Corona (T170); Toyota Carina (T170)

Powertrain
- Engine: 1838 cc 4S-Fi/-FE DOHC I4; 1998 cc 3S-FE DOHC I4; 1998 cc 3S-GE DOHC I4
- Transmission: 5-speed S55 manual; 4-speed A140E automatic

Dimensions
- Wheelbase: 2,525 mm (99.4 in)
- Length: 4,485 mm (176.6 in)
- Width: 1,690 mm (67 in)
- Height: 1,315 mm (51.8 in)
- Curb weight: 1,110–1,545 kg (2,447–3,406 lb)

The restyled second generation was introduced in September 1989, and luxury equipment content increased. Some changes were made to the availability of engines, while the transmissions and the front and rear suspension carried over from the previous generation.

The trim levels started with the base model 1.8 F, followed by the 1.8 S, 1.8 X, 2.0 S-Limited, 2.0 X, and top-of-the-line 2.0 G-Limited. Some of the optional features included a MOMO leather-wrapped steering wheel with matching manual transmission gearshift handle and matching 14" alloy wheels, keyless remote entry, a driver-side airbag, and a six-disc CD player installed in the trunk added to the AM/FM Stereo cassette player.

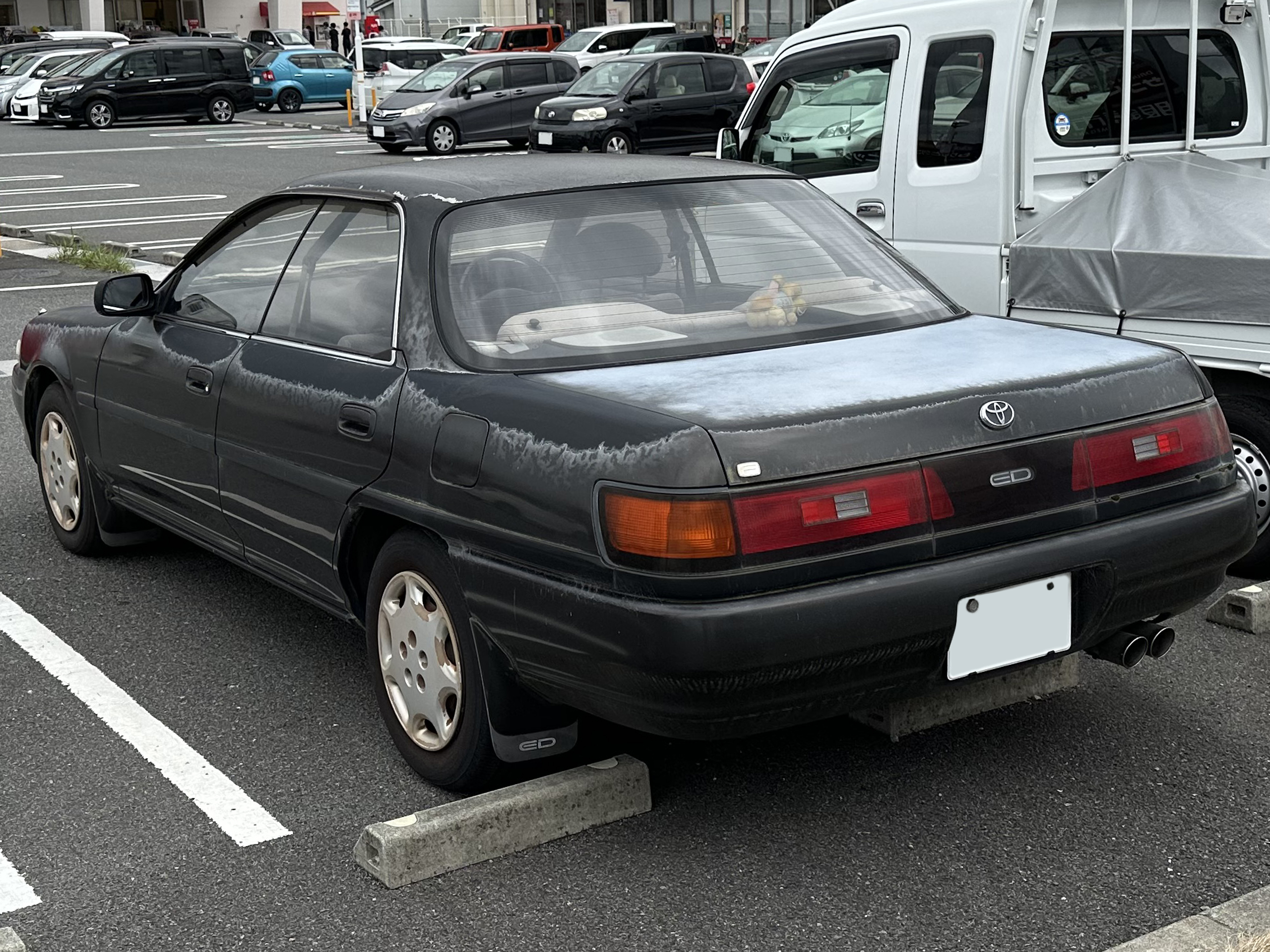
Toyota Carina ED 1.8 F (ST180, Japan)

The Carina ED introduced an acoustically balanced collection of ten speakers, labeled as "Super Live Sound System," with two-way speakers installed in the front doors, speakers in the lower half of the dashboard facing front passengers, and two-way speakers in the parcel shelf behind the rear seats, including sub-woofers. The total power output was 220 watts. The CD player offered four times oversampling and digital filtering. Diversity antennae were integrated into the rear window with the electric defroster included.

TEMS was offered on the G-Limited, Type S, and Type X with the 2.0-liter engine, while four-wheel steering, labeled as 4WS on the trunk lid, was standard on the Type G-Limited and optional on the Type X and Type S with both engines offered. The speed-sensitive power steering was linked to the ECT-S automatic transmission and TEMS, so performance and handling could be changed for spirited driving. With the 4WS engaged, the turning circle was 4,700 mm (15.4 ft). Four-wheel ventilated disc brakes were available with ABS.

- ST180 - 1,800cc 2WS
- ST181 - 1,800cc 4WS
- ST182 - 2,000cc 2WS
- ST183 - 2,000cc 4WS

Styling was updated and shared a corporate appearance with the Toyota Corona and Toyota Carina, along with the Japan-only Toyota Camry V30 "narrow-body" and the "wide-body" Toyota Scepter.With the success of the previous generation, the Toyota Corona EXiV was introduced at Toyopet Store locations as a hardtop sedan alternative to the longer Toyota Mark II X80 sedan. The climate controls were upgraded to a keyboard-type design shared across all Toyota products for easier use.

Multi-port electronic fuel injection was standard on all engines offered as the 4S-FE replaced the 4S-Fi. In August 1990, the output of the lesser, narrow-valve 2.0-litre 3S-FE was increased simultaneously, from 125 to 140 PS (92 to 103 kW).

Facelift was given in August 1991. From 1989 to 1993, Toyota sold 196,945 Carina ED and 163,881 Corona EXiV when the T180 series production ended.

== Third generation (ST200; 1993) ==
Third generation
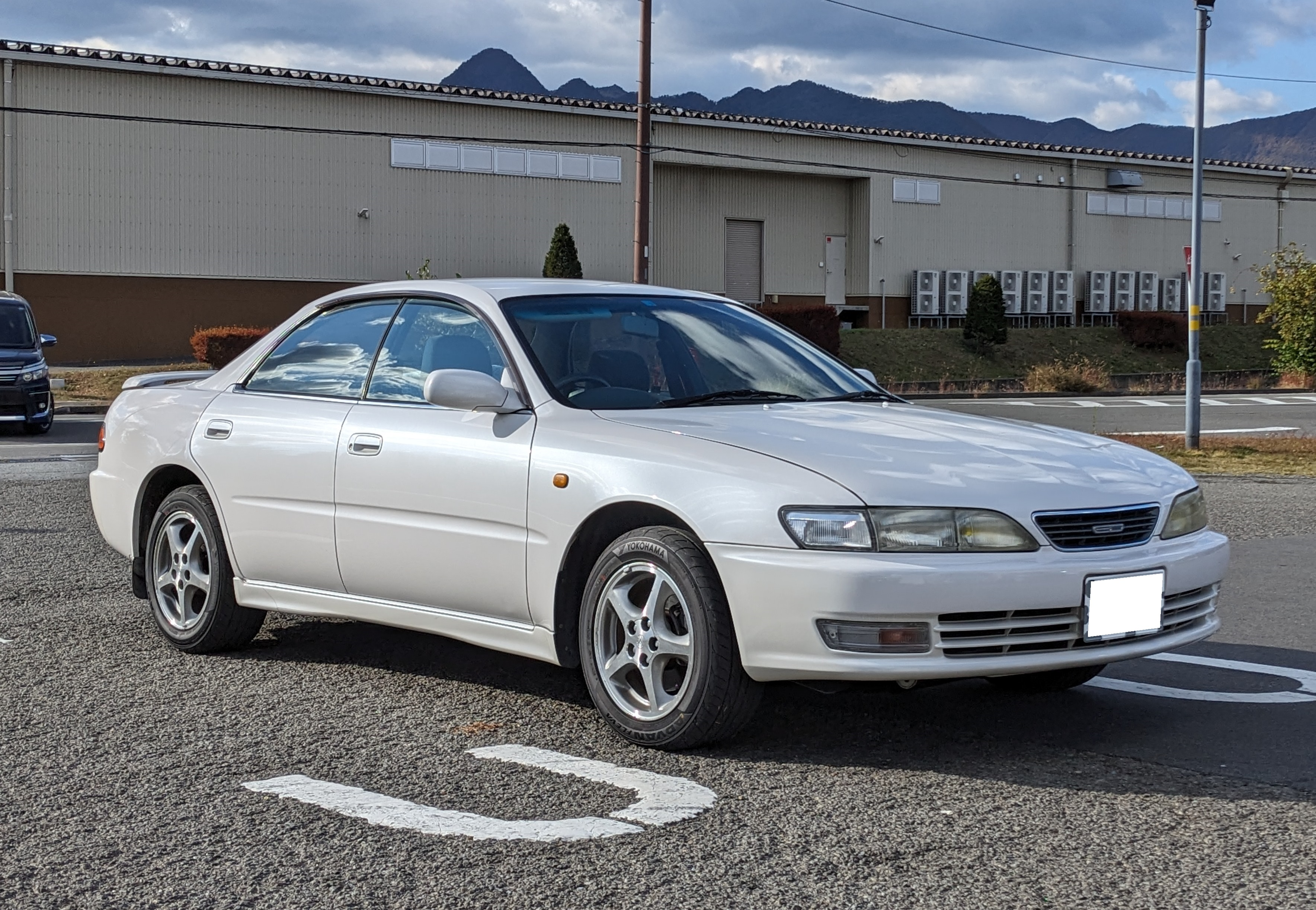
- Toyota Carina ED 2.0 GT (ST202, Japan)

Overview
- Production: 1993–1998

Body and chassis
- Body style: 4-door hardtop sedan
- Layout: Front-engine, front-wheel-drive; Front-engine, all-wheel-drive
- Related: Toyota Corona EXiV; Toyota Curren; Toyota Celica (T200); Toyota Celica GT-Four (ST205); Toyota Corona (T190); Toyota Carina (T190)

Powertrain
- Engine: 1838 cc 4S-FE DOHC I4; 1998 cc 3S-FE DOHC I4; 1998 cc 3S-GE DOHC I4
- Transmission: 5-speed S55 manual; 5-speed E154F manual AWD; 4-speed A241E automatic; 4-speed A241H automatic AWD

Dimensions
- Wheelbase: 2,535 mm (99.8 in)
- Length: 4,500 mm (180 in)
- Width: 1,740 mm (69 in)
- Height: 1,325 mm (52.2 in)

For this generation, the distinguishing genuine hardtop body style was discontinued and replaced with a B-pillar hardtop. Structural integrity was improved, and a crumple zone safety cage was offered for the passenger compartment. The Carina ED benefited from the sleek styling of the 1993 Toyota Supra A80, including the interior, form-fitting seats, and the wrap-around dashboard.

The "Super Live Sound System," previously introduced, added Digital Sound Processing that allowed playback to simulate four environments: private club, cathedral, stadium, or natural, without any modification.

Initially the trim level designations were the base 1.8 F followed by the 1.8 X, 2.0 S-Limited, 2.0 X, and the top-of-the line 2.0 G-Limited. As a result of styling changes, sales improved compared to the second generation. A driver-side airbag, as were speed-sensitive door locks, an in-dash CD player, a MiniDisc player, a retractable four-inch television screen installed below the mid-level AM/FM stereo cassette that was dealer installed, and climate-controlled air conditioning were optional. A passenger-side airbag appeared optionally in June 1996. Other options included remote keyless entry, front and rear parking sensors, and a cabin air filter. TOM'S appearance items replaced the previous MOMO equipment, adding special alloy wheels, leather-wrapped steering wheel and automatic transmission gear selector, while the manual transmission knob was stainless steel and vehicles equipped have a badge on the front fender below the all-new side turn signal indicator.

The Carina ED was also offered with Full-time 4WD, but unlike the turbocharged Toyota Celica GT-Four, the Carina ED 2.0 GT was powered by the normally-aspirated 3S-GE engine. The All-Trac four-wheel drive system was optional and was borrowed from the and four-wheel steering continued from previous generations coupled with ABS. To take advantage of the all-wheel-drive and four-wheel-steering, Toyota also installed a modified MacPherson strut for the front wheels called Super Strut instead of installing the more elaborate and expensive TEMS and offered limited-slip differential for front wheel drive vehicles.

A facelift was released in August 1995. The line up was now consisted of the 1.8 V, 2.0 X, 2.0 X 4WS, 2.0 GT, and 2.0 GT 4WD. Optional "Exciting Version" package was available for all models. This optional package includes trunk spoiler, upgraded sound system, and wireless door remote control for all grades, alloy wheels for the X and GT, as well as the side spoilers or rocker panels exclusively for the GT.

Production ended due to economic conditions in April 1998.

- ST200 - 1,800cc 2WS FF
- ST201 - 1,800cc 4WS FF
- ST202 - 2,000cc 2WS FF
- ST203 - 2,000cc 4WS FF
- ST205 - 2,000cc 2WS AWD

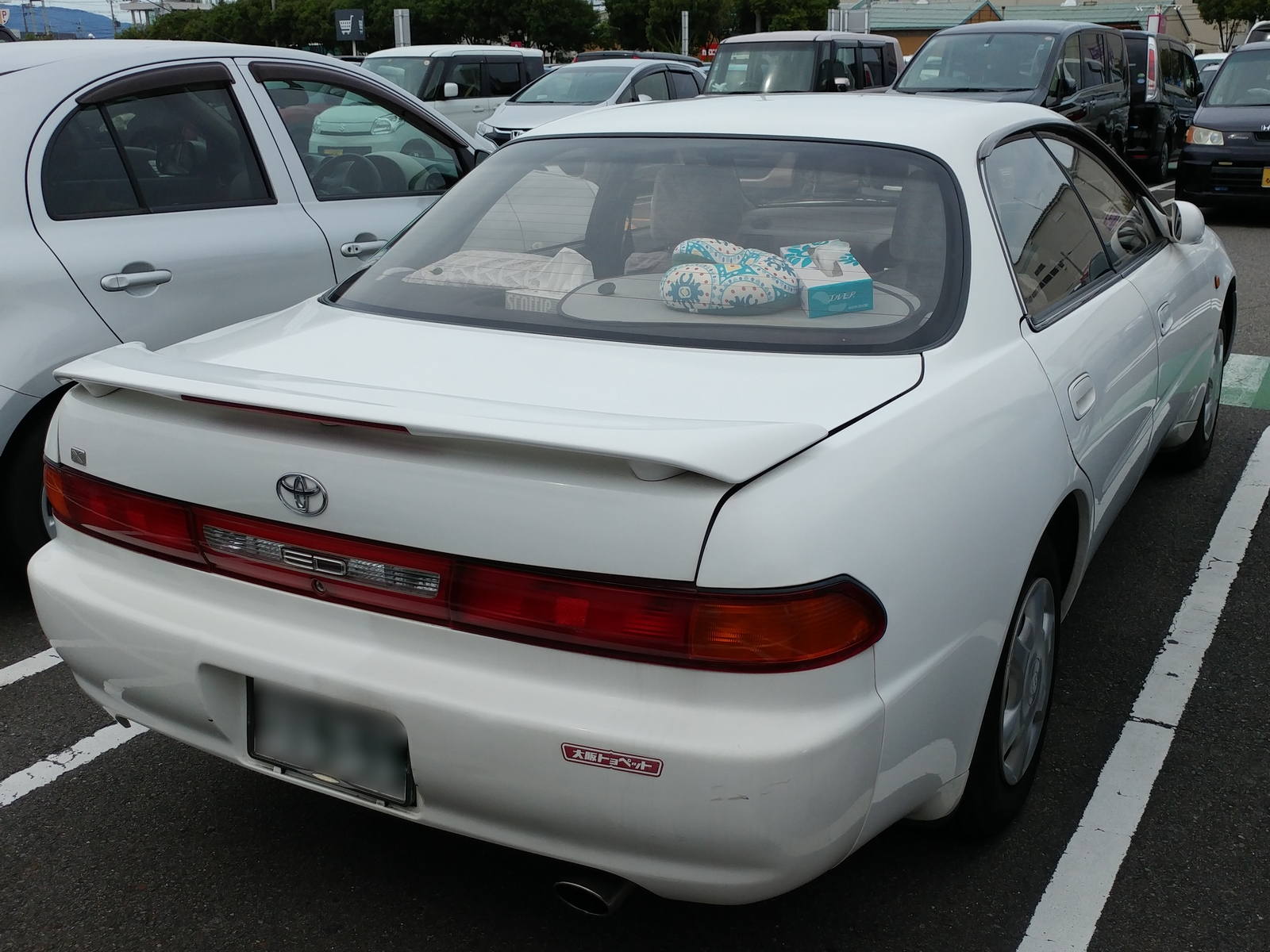
Pre-facelift Toyota Carina ED 1.8 X (ST200, Japan)

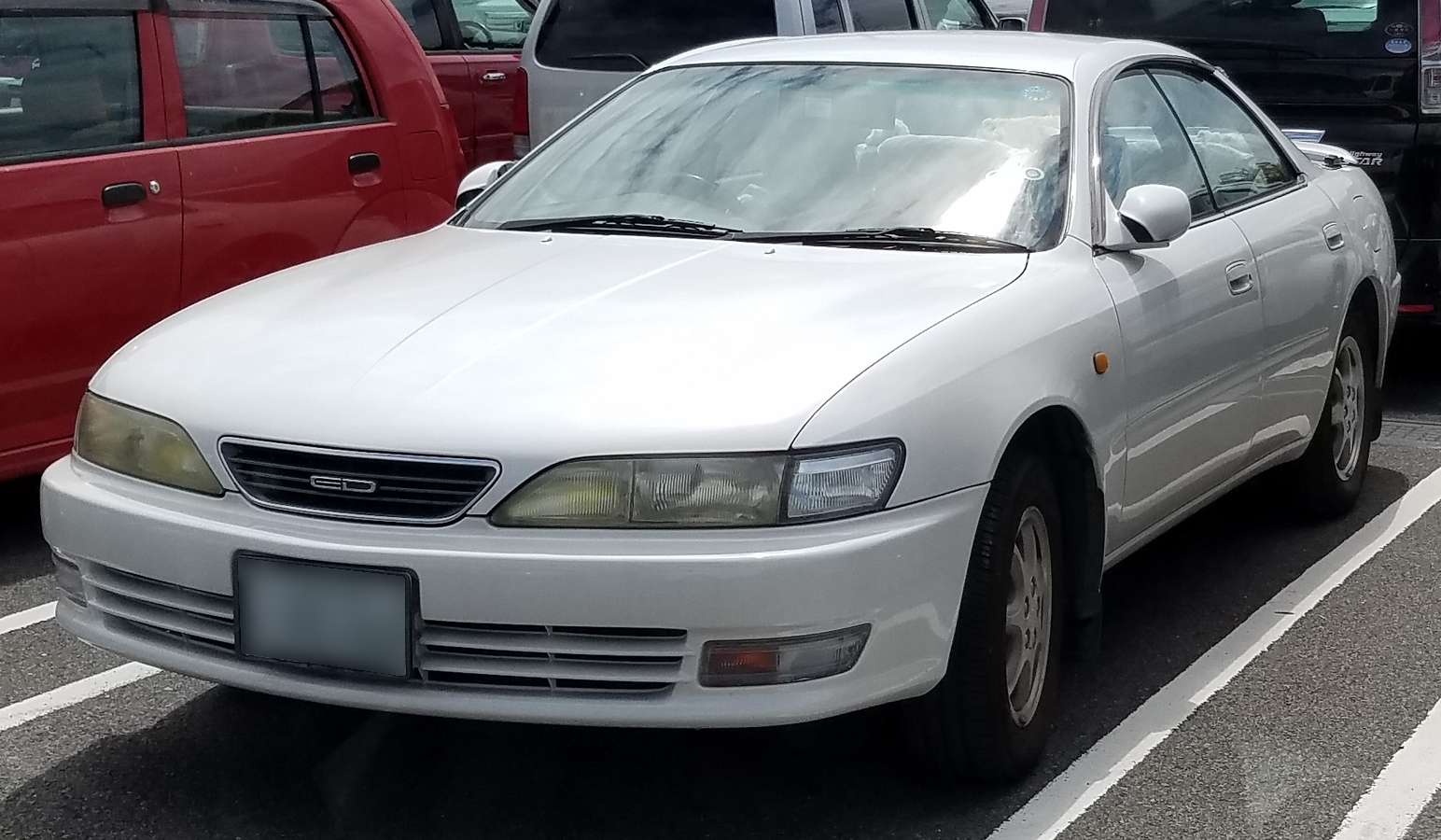
Facelift Toyota Carina ED 2.0 X Exciting Version (ST202, Japan)

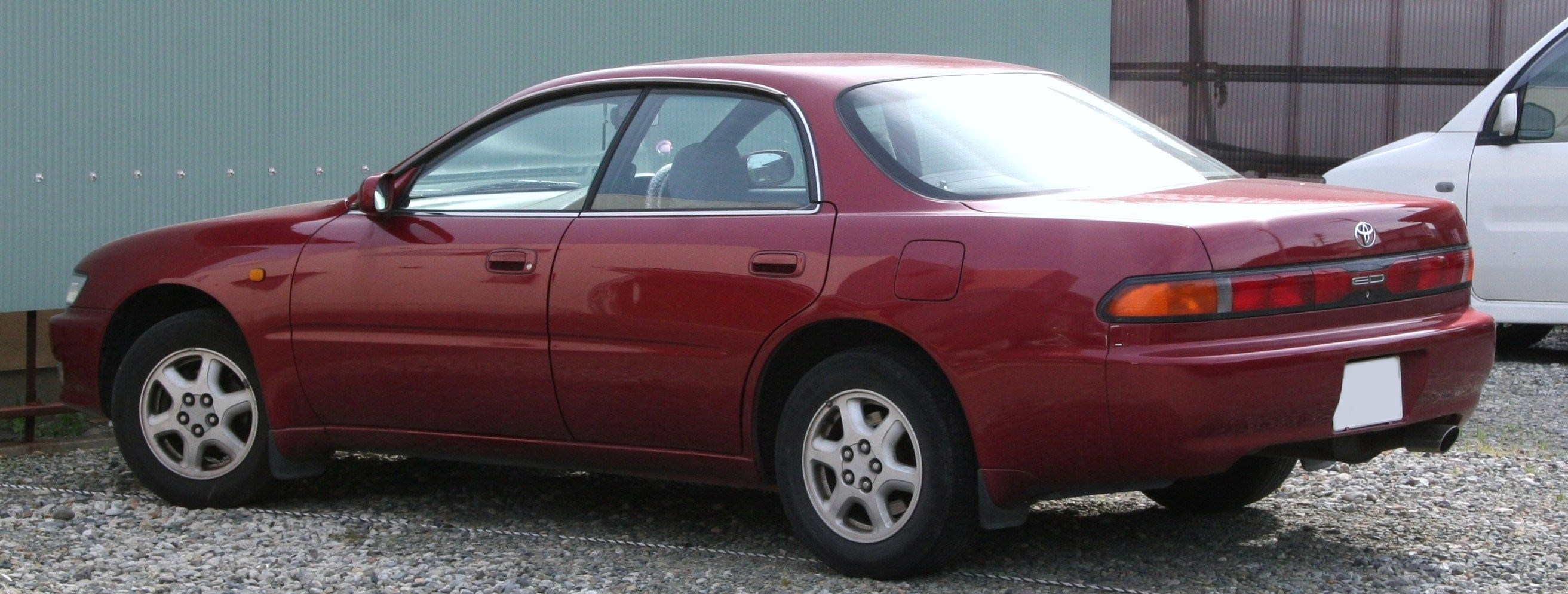
Facelift Toyota Carina ED 2.0 X (ST202, Japan)

== See also ==
- List of Toyota vehicles
