= Toyota S engine =

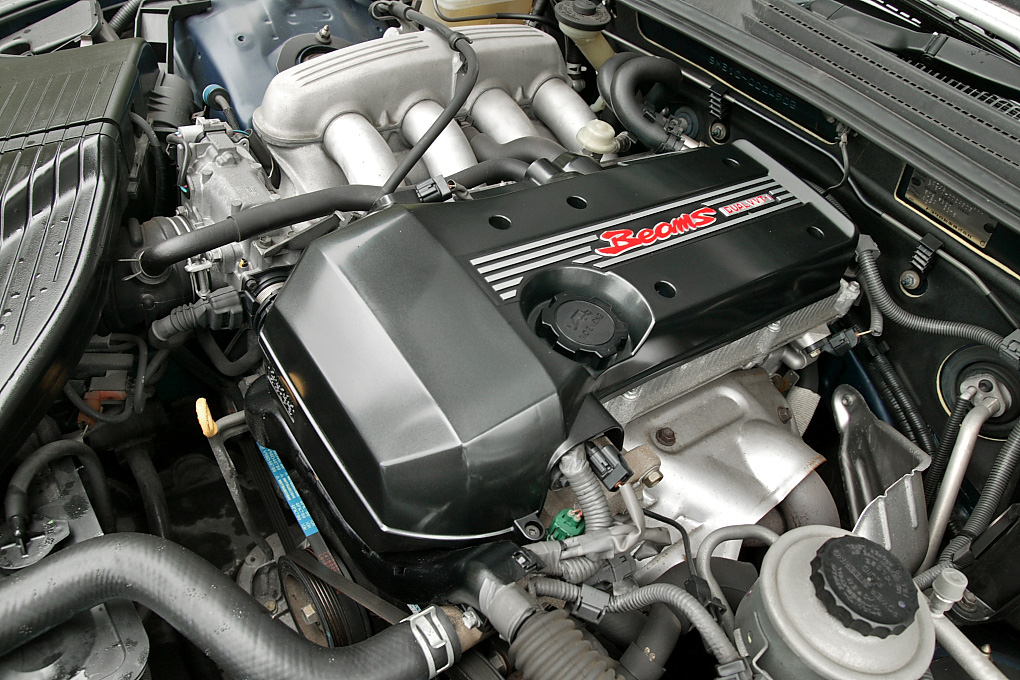
- 3S-GE engine in a Toyota Altezza

Overview
- Manufacturer: Toyota Motor Corporation
- Production: 1980–2007

Layout
- Configuration: Inline-four engine

Chronology
- Successor: Toyota AZ engine Toyota AR engine

The Toyota S Series engines are a family of straight-four petrol (or CNG) engines with displacements between 1.8 and 2.2 litres, produced by Toyota Motor Corporation from January 1980 to August 2007. The S series has cast iron engine blocks and aluminium cylinder heads. This engine was designed around the new LASRE technology for lighter weight – such as sintered hollow camshafts.

== Table of S-block engines ==
S block engines
Code	Years	Bore	Stroke	Compr.	Displ.	Power	Torque	Notes
1S	1982–1988	80.5 mm	90.0 mm	9:1	1,832 cc	90 PS (66 kW; 89 hp) at 5,200/5,400 rpm	142 N⋅m (105 lbf⋅ft) at 3,400 rpm	Camry (SV10 export)
1S-L	Unknown	80.5 mm	90.0 mm	9:1	1,832 cc	68 kW (92 PS; 91 hp) at 5,200 rpm	142 N⋅m (105 lbf⋅ft) at 3,400 rpm	Corona (ST150) (New Zealand, Latin America)
1S-U; 1S-LU	1982–1986	80.5 mm	90.0 mm	9:1	1,832 cc	100 PS (74 kW; 99 hp) at 5,400 rpm	152 N⋅m (112 lbf⋅ft) at 3,400 rpm	Carina RWD (SA60); Carina FF (ST150); Celica (SA60); Mark II/Chaser/Cresta (SX60/SX70); Corona (ST140); Corona FF (ST150); Camry/Vista (SV10)
1S-iLU	1983–1986	80.5 mm	90.0 mm	9:1	1,832 cc	105 PS (77 kW; 104 hp) at 5,400 rpm	157–160 N⋅m (116–118 lbf⋅ft) at 2,800-3,000 rpm	Carina (ST150); Carina ED (ST160); Corona FF (ST150); Camry/Vista (SV10)
1S-iL	1986	80.5 mm	90.0 mm	9:1	1,832 cc	90 PS (66 kW; 89 hp) at 5,200 rpm	142 N⋅m (105 lbf⋅ft) at 3,400 rpm	EU
1S-E	1984–1987	80.5 mm	90.0 mm	Unknown	1,832 cc	Unknown	Unknown	Cressida/MKII/Chaser (SX60)
1S-ELU	1983–1986	80.5 mm	90.0 mm	9:1	1,832 cc	115 PS (85 kW; 113 hp) at 5,400 rpm	164 N⋅m (121 lbf⋅ft) at 4,000 rpm	Corona FF (ST150)
1S-EL	1986	80.5 mm	90.0 mm	9:1	1,832 cc	100 PS (74 kW; 99 hp) at 5,200 rpm	154 N⋅m (114 lbf⋅ft) at 4,000 rpm	EU
2S	1984–???	84.0 mm	90.0 mm	Unknown	1,995 cc	Unknown	Unknown	
2S-C	1983–1986	84.0 mm	90.0 mm	8.7:1	1,995 cc	73 kW (99 PS; 98 hp) at 5,200 rpm	157 N⋅m (116 lbf⋅ft) at 3,200 rpm	Corona (ST141) (Australia); Celica (SA6x) (not US)
2S-E	1982–1987	84.0 mm	90.0 mm	8.7:1	1,995 cc	92 hp (69 kW; 93 PS) at 4,200 rpm	153 N⋅m (113 lbf⋅ft) at 2,400 rpm	
2S-E	1986	84.0 mm	90.0 mm	8.7:1	1,995 cc	97 hp (72 kW; 98 PS)	Unknown	US (but not Canadian) Camrys; The extra power is related to new timing, which is now electronically controlled.
2S-E	1986	84.0 mm	90.0 mm	9:1	1,995 cc	107 PS (79 kW; 106 hp)	Unknown	Carina II ST151
2S-ELU	1986	84.0 mm	90.0 mm	8.7:1	1,995 cc	120 PS (88 kW; 118 hp) at 5,400 rpm	173 N⋅m (128 lbf⋅ft) at 4,000 rpm	Camry/Vista (SV10)
2S-EL	1984–1986	84.0 mm	90.0 mm	9:1	1,995 cc	107 PS (79 kW; 106 hp) at 5,200 rpm	166–173 N⋅m (122–128 lbf⋅ft) at 4,000 rpm	Camry (SV11), EU; Toyota Corona (ST151), NZ
2S-ELU	1986	84.0 mm	90.0 mm	9:1	1,995 cc	98 hp (73 kW; 99 PS) at 5,400 rpm	160 N⋅m (120 lbf⋅ft) at 4,000 rpm	US
2S-E	1986	84.0 mm	90.0 mm	8.7:1	1,995 cc	100 PS (74 kW; 99 hp) at 5,400 rpm	161 N⋅m (119 lbf⋅ft) at 4,000 rpm	Camry SV11
3S-FC	1987–1991	86.0 mm	86.0 mm	9.8:1	1,998 cc	115 PS (85 kW; 113 hp) at 5,600 rpm 82 kW (111 PS; 110 hp) at 5,600 rpm (Aus)	166 N⋅m (122 lbf⋅ft) at 3,200 rpm	Catalyzed; Camry (SV21); Holden Apollo (JK/JL)
3S-FE	1987–1990	86.0 mm	86.0 mm	9.8:1	1,998 cc	90 kW (122 PS; 121 hp) at 5,600 rpm	169 N⋅m (125 lbf⋅ft) at 4,400 rpm	Celica GT (US), Celica ZR (Japan, ST162)
3S-FE	1987–1994	86.0 mm	86.0 mm	9.8:1	1,998 cc	115 PS (85 kW; 113 hp) at 5,600 rpm	162 N⋅m (119 lbf⋅ft) at 4,400 rpm	Equipped with catalytic converter
3S-FE	1995–1998	86.0 mm	86.0 mm	9.8:1	1,998 cc	130 PS (96 kW; 128 hp) at 6,000 rpm	178 N⋅m (131 lbf⋅ft) at 4,400 rpm	Refined valve timing and ECU settings, introduced with Carina E (ST190) model
3S-FE	1998–2000	86.0 mm	86.0 mm	9.8:1	1,998 cc	94 kW (128 PS; 126 hp) at 6,000 rpm	178 N⋅m (131 lbf⋅ft) at 4,400 rpm	Slightly less power with better torque characteristics. Stricter pollution control. Introduced with the new Avensis (ST220) model
3S-FSE	2001–2003(?)	86.0 mm	86.0 mm	9.8:1	1,998 cc	107 kW (145 PS; 143 hp) at 6,000 rpm	196 N⋅m (145 lbf⋅ft) at 4,400 rpm	D-4 (Direct injection); Corona Premio G D-4 Package (ST210), Nadia D-4 (SXN10-AHSEH)
3S-GE	1985–1989	86.0 mm	86.0 mm	9.2:1	1,998 cc	103 kW (140 PS; 138 hp) at 6,200 rpm	175 N⋅m (129 lbf⋅ft) at 4,800 rpm	Celica 2.0 GT-i 16, GT-R, GT-S (ST162)
3S-GE	1989–1993	86.0 mm	86.0 mm	10.0:1	1,998 cc	115 kW (156 PS; 154 hp) at 6,600 rpm	186 N⋅m (137 lbf⋅ft) at 4,800 rpm	Celica 2.0 GT-i 16, GT-R (ST182/ST183), MR2 (SW20)
3S-GE	1994–1998	86.0 mm	86.0 mm	10.3:1	1,998 cc	132 kW (180 PS; 178 hp) at 7,000 rpm	192 N⋅m (142 lbf⋅ft) at 4,800 rpm	Celica GT, SS-II (ST202), MR2 (SW20), Curren ZS (ST206)
3S-GE	1997–1998	86.0 mm	86.0 mm	11.0:1	1,998 cc	147 kW (200 PS; 197 hp) at 7,000 rpm	210 N⋅m (155 lbf⋅ft) at 6,000 rpm	Celica (ST202), MR2 (SW20)
3S-GE	1997–1998	86.0 mm	86.0 mm	10.5:1	1,998 cc	140 kW (190 PS; 188 hp) at 7,000 rpm	210 N⋅m (155 lbf⋅ft) at 6,000 rpm	RAV4 (SXA10), Caldina (ST210)
3S-GE	1997–2005	86.0 mm	86.0 mm	11.5:1	1,998 cc	156 kW (212 PS; 209 hp) at 7,500 rpm	220 N⋅m (162 lbf⋅ft)	Altezza, Caldina GT
3S-GT (503E)	1987–199?	89.0 mm	86.0 mm	7.0:1	2,140 cc	560 PS (412 kW; 552 hp) at 8,500 rpm	639 N⋅m (471 lb⋅ft) at 5,500 rpm	87C, 88C, Eagle HF89, Eagle Mk III
503E	1987–1989	89.0 mm	86.0 mm	7.0:1	2,140 cc	680 PS (500 kW; 671 hp) at 8,500 rpm	639 N⋅m (471 lb⋅ft) at 5,500 rpm	87C, 88C (Le Mans setup with CT26R turbocharger)
503E	1995–1996	89.0 mm	86.0 mm	7.0:1	2,140 cc	680 PS (500 kW; 671 hp) at 8,500 rpm	Unknown	Supra GT JZA80 (Le Mans setup, Garrett turbocharger with 55.9 mm restrictor)
503E	1997	86.0 mm	86.0 mm	7.0:1	1,998 cc	480 PS (353 kW; 473 hp) at 6,800 rpm	639 N⋅m (471 lb⋅ft) at 4,500 rpm	Supra GT JZA80 (JGTC setup with 45.3 mm restrictor)
3S-GTE	1986–1989	86.0 mm	86.0 mm	8.5:1	1,998 cc	185 PS (136 kW; 182 hp) at 6,000 rpm	250 N⋅m (184 lbf⋅ft) at 3,600 rpm	Celica GT-Four (ST165)
3S-GTE	1990–1993	86.0 mm	86.0 mm	8.8:1	1,998 cc	224 PS (165 kW; 221 hp) at 6,000 rpm	304 N⋅m (224 lbf⋅ft) at 3,200 rpm	Celica GT-Four (ST185), MR2 (SW20)
3S-GTE	1994–1999	86.0 mm	86.0 mm	8.5:1	1,998 cc	245 PS (180 kW; 242 hp) at 6,000 rpm	304 N⋅m (224 lbf⋅ft) at 4,000 rpm	Celica GT-Four (ST205), MR2 (SW20)
3S-GTE	1999–2007	86.0 mm	86.0 mm	9.0:1	1,998 cc	260 PS (191 kW; 256 hp) at 6,200 rpm	324 N⋅m (239 lbf⋅ft) at 4,400 rpm	Caldina GT-T (ST215W), Caldina GT-Four (ST246W)
4S-Fi	1987–1991	82.5 mm	86.0 mm	9.3:1	1,838 cc	105 PS (77 kW; 104 hp) at 5,600 rpm	149 N⋅m (110 lbf⋅ft) at 2,800 rpm	Single point fuel injection Carina ED/Corona EXiV (ST180/181 Phase 1)
4S-FE	1989–1998	82.5 mm	86.0 mm	9.5:1	1,838 cc	115 PS (85 kW; 113 hp) at 5,600 rpm	157 N⋅m (116 lbf⋅ft) at 4,400 rpm	Corona (ST170); Carina ED/Corona EXiV (ST180/181 Phase 2 and 3)
4S-FE	1995–1998	82.5 mm	86.0 mm	9.5:1	1,838 cc	125 PS (92 kW; 123 hp) at 6,000 rpm	162 N⋅m (119 lbf⋅ft) at 4,600 rpm	MKII/Chaser (SX80); Vista Etoile (SV30)
5S-FE	1990–1992	87.0 mm	91.0 mm	9.5:1	2,164 cc	132 PS (97 kW; 130 hp) at 5,400 rpm	197 N⋅m (145 lb⋅ft) at 4,400 rpm	Celica ST184 (5th Gen) Australia, MR2 (SW21), Toyota Camry
5S-FE	1993–2001	87.0 mm	91.0 mm	9.5:1	2,164 cc	137 PS (101 kW; 135 hp) at 5,400 rpm	197 N⋅m (145 lb⋅ft) at 4,400 rpm	Celica ST204 (6th Gen) Australia, MR2 (SW21), Toyota Camry
5S-FE	1997–1999	87.0 mm	91.0 mm	9.5:1	2,164 cc	135 PS (99 kW; 133 hp) at 5,200 rpm	199 N⋅m (147 lb⋅ft) at 4,400 rpm	Camry (4th Gen) U.S. spec 1st semester styling
5S-FE	2000–2001	87.0 mm	91.0 mm	9.5:1	2,164 cc	138 PS (101 kW; 136 hp) at 5,200 rpm	203 N⋅m (150 lb⋅ft) at 4,400 rpm	Camry (4th Gen) U.S. spec 2nd semester styling

== 1S ==
The 1.8 L (1,832 cc) 1S is the first version of the S-series engine. It is a member of Toyota's Lasre engine family (Lightweight Advanced Super Response Engine). Bore and stroke are 80.5 × 90.0 mm. The engine was first seen in 1981, and was fitted to a wide range of Toyotas, in both RWD and FWD applications.

=== 1S (1S-U) ===
Original 1S engine, designed for longitudinal, rear-wheel-drive applications. Designated 1S-U with Japanese emissions controls.

- Production: June 1981 — June 1988
- Displacement: 1832 cc
- Mounting: longitudinal
- Type: SOHC 8-valve
- Bore/stroke: 80.5 × 89.9 mm
- Compression ratio: 9.1
- Outputs:
  - 100 PS (74 kW) at 5,400 rpm / 152 N⋅m (112 lb⋅ft) at 3,400 rpm
- Applications:
  - Toyota Celica (SA60)
  - Toyota Carina (SA60)
  - Toyota Corona (ST140)
  - Toyota Mark II (SX70)

=== 1S-L (1S-LU) ===
Adaption of the 1S engine, designed for transverse, front-wheel-drive applications. Designated 1S-LU with Japanese emissions controls.

- Production: March 1982 — August 1983
- Displacement: 1832 cc
- Mounting: transverse
- Type: SOHC 8-valve
- Bore/stroke: 80.5 × 89.9 mm
- Compression ratio: 9.1
- Outputs:
  - 100 PS (74 kW) at 5,400 rpm / 152 N⋅m (112 lb⋅ft) at 3,400 rpm
- Applications:
  - Toyota Camry/Vista (SV10)
  - Toyota Corona (ST150)

=== 1S-iL (1S-iLU; 1S-i) ===
Adaption of the 1S-L engine, with added central injection (Ci). Designated 1S-iLU with Japanese emissions controls.

Later versions renamed 1S-i. Sometimes labelled 1S-Ci in marketing material.

- Production: September 1983 — April 1988
- Displacement: 1832 cc
- Mounting: transverse
- Type: SOHC 8-valve, central injection
- Bore/stroke: 80.5 × 89.9 mm
- Compression ratio: 9.1
- Outputs:
  - 85 PS (63 kW) at 5,200 rpm / 142 N⋅m (105 lb⋅ft) at 3,000 rpm
  - 105 PS (77 kW) at 5,400 rpm / 157 N⋅m (116 lb⋅ft) at 3,000 rpm
  - 105 PS (77 kW) at 5,400 rpm / 160 N⋅m (118 lb⋅ft) at 3,000 rpm
- Applications:
  - Toyota Camry/Vista (SV10)
  - Toyota Camry/Vista (SV20)
  - Toyota Corona (ST150)

=== 1S-EL (1S-ELU; 1S-E) ===
Adaption of the 1S-L engine, with added multiport fuel injection. Designated 1S-ELU with Japanese emissions controls.

Later versions renamed 1S-E.

- Production: September 1983 — April 1988
- Displacement: 1832 cc
- Mounting: transverse
- Type: SOHC 8-valve, multipoint fuel injection
- Bore/stroke: 80.5 × 89.9 mm
- Compression ratio: 9.1
- Outputs:
  - 115 PS (85 kW) at 5,400 rpm / 164 N⋅m (121 lb⋅ft) at 4000 rpm
- Applications:
  - Toyota Corona (ST150)

== 2S ==
The 2S is a 2.0 L (1,995 cc) four-cylinder engine with an iron block and an alloy head. Bore and stroke are 84.0 × 90.0 mm. This was to be the last of the S engine family not to be equipped with double overhead camshafts.

The 2S (with no extra letters at the end) is carburetted.

=== 2S-C ===
The 2S-C is the same as the 2S except it has US emissions controls.

It was used in the Australian delivered SA63 Celica (replacing the 21R-C powered RA60), and ST141 Corona.

=== 2S-E, 2S-EL, 2S-ELU, 2S-ELC ===
The 2S-E is the same as the 2S except it uses EFI. This particular engine was used in the Camry and in the Celica ST161. It was fitted with hydraulic lash adjusters.

The 2S-EL, 2S-ELU and 2S-ELC are the same as the 2S-E except they are transversely mounted (as fitted to the V10 Camry). The 2S-ELU has Japanese emission controls and the 2S-ELC has US emission controls.

== 3S ==
The 3S is a 2.0 L (1,998 cc) inline-four engine with an iron block and an alloy head. Similar to the 2S engine, the bore was increased to 86.0 mm and the stroke was reduced to 86.0 mm, allowing for the fitment of larger valves and enabling higher power outputs. First introduced in May 1984, the 3S remained in production until 2007.

=== 3S-FC ===
Two-barrel carburettor version of the 3S-FE. This engine is found in lower-specification variants of the 1986–1992 Toyota Camry and its Holden Apollo twin (SL and SLX versions). Power is 82 kW (111 PS) at 5,600 rpm, with max torque of 166 N⋅m (122 lb⋅ft) at 3,200 rpm.

=== 3S-FE ===
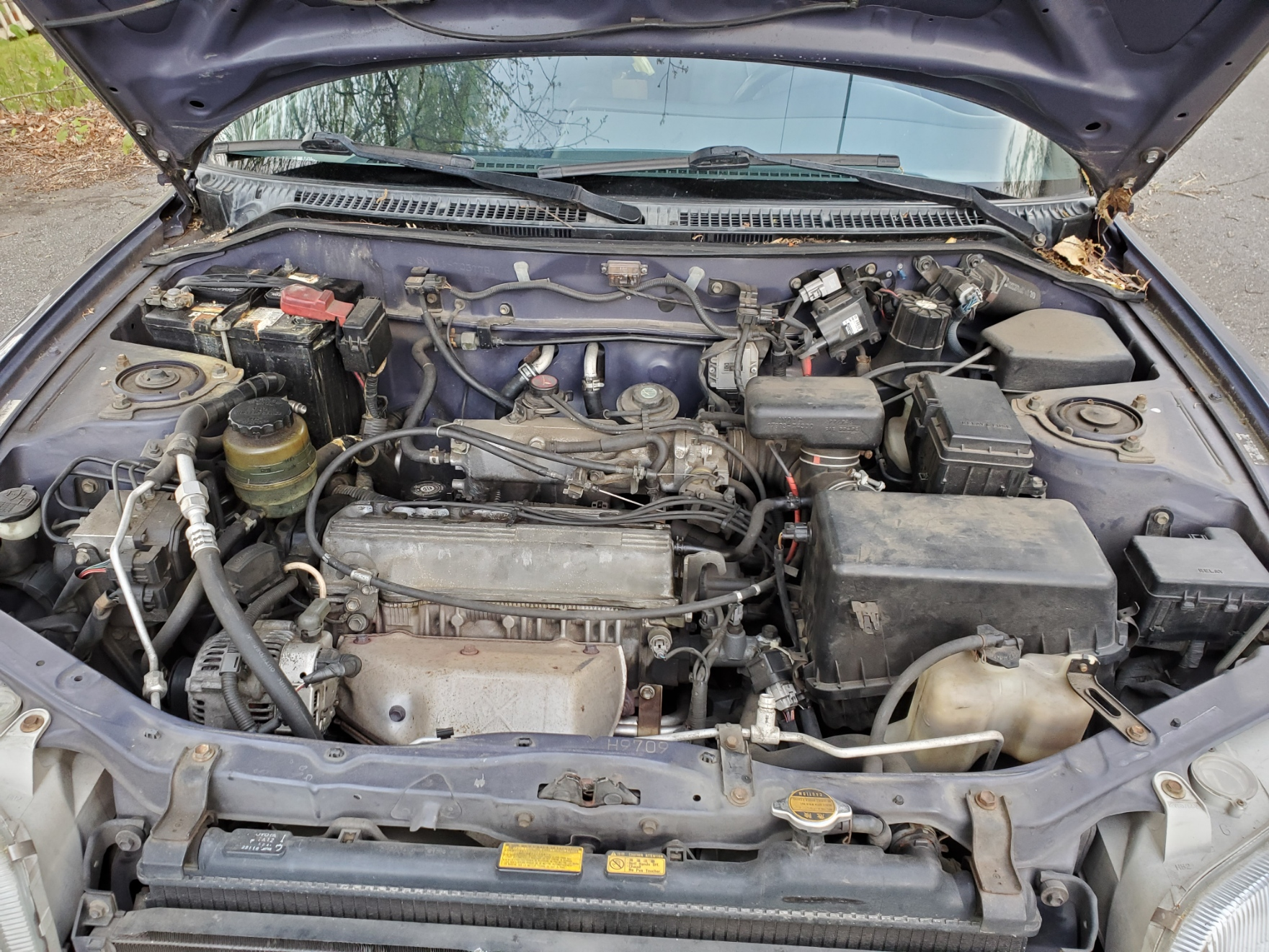
3S-FE engine in a 1997 RAV4 (XA10)

The Toyota 3S-FE is a 16-valve 2.0 L twin camshaft, single cam gear engine built by Toyota from 1986 to 2000. European version produces 128 PS (94 kW; 126 hp) at 7,900 rpm and 179 Nm (132 ft-lb) at 4,400 rpm without a catalytic converter; with, maximum power is 121 PS (89 kW; 119 hp). It is commonly used in the Camry 1987–1992 model, the Celica T160/T180/T200, Carina 1987–1992, Carina 1988–2001, Caldina 1992–2002, Carina ED 1985–1998 and Carina E 1993–1998 models, Corona T170/T190 as well as Avensis 1997–2000 models and RAV4, 1994–2000, Picnic/Ipsum 1996–2002 and Comfort 2001–2007. The 3S-FE was also used in some MR2 Mk2 cars due to its torque band being suitable for the automatic models. The 3S-FE is fitted with EFI. The 3S-FE engine is fitted with a cast iron crankshaft, whereas the 3S-GE/GELU engines have forged crankshafts.

The 3S-FSE was a direct injection engine with Toyota D4 system. A cam driven high pressure fuel pump is at the #4 end of the head. This engine was only released in Japan, and installed in the Camry (Windom).

=== 3S-GE ===
The Toyota 3S-GE (originally titled 3S-GELU in transversely-mounted applications with Japanese emission controls), is an in-line 4 cylinder engine in the S engine family, manufactured by Toyota and designed in conjunction with Yamaha. While the block is iron, the cylinder head is made of aluminium alloy. The pent-roof combustion chambers are complemented by a cross-flow intake and exhaust layout. The spark plug is located in the center of the combustion chamber. The firing order is 1-3-4-2, with cylinder number 1 adjacent to the timing belt. The 3S-GE was designed to be light, the first iteration 3S-GELU weighing in at a low 143 kg (315 lb).

The forged crankshaft, located within the crankcase, rotates on five aluminium alloy bearings and is balanced by eight weights. Oil holes are located in the middle of the crankshaft to provide oil to the connecting rods, bearing, pistons and other moving components. The intake manifold has four independent ports and benefits from inertia build up to improve engine torque at low and medium speeds.

A single timing belt drives the intake and exhaust camshaft. The cam journals are supported on five points between the valve lifters of each cylinder and on the front of the cylinder head, and are lubricated by an oiler port located in the middle of the camshaft.

The pistons are made from an aluminium alloy, designed to withstand high temperatures. An indentation is incorporated into the piston head to prevent the pistons from hitting the valves, should the timing belt break (this is not true of the later BEAMS - an acronym which stands for Breakthrough Engine with Advanced Mechanism System - motors). This is commonly referred to as a "non-interference" engine. Piston pins holding the pistons in place are locked by snap rings. The "Outer Shim Type System" allows for the replacement of the shims without the need to remove the camshaft. To adjust the valve clearance, adjust the shims above the valve lifters.

The first compression ring and the oil ring are made of steel, the second compression ring is made of cast iron. Compression rings 1 and 2 prevent exhaust leakage from the combustion chamber while the oil ring works to clear oil off the cylinder walls, preventing excessive oil from entering the combustion chamber. An oil pan baffle is used to ensure that there is sufficient oil available to the oil pump.

There are five generations of the 3S-GE, which were used in the Toyota Celica, Toyota Corona, MR2, Caldina, RAV4, and Altezza. All 3S-GE engines had a displacement of 2.0 L (1,998 cc). Additionally, the turbocharged 3S-GTE engines are based on the 3S-GE platform.

==== Generation 1 ====
The first-generation 3S-GE was produced from May 1984 to 1989, arriving in both North American versions, as well as in Japan as a second variation. The North American engine was slightly less powerful, producing around 135 bhp (101 kW). This engine was the only 3S-GE to come to North America, in the Celica GT-S (ST162). Among other things, the Japanese market version sported a more aggressive ECU and lacked the EGR valve system, pushing the output to somewhere around 160 PS (118 kW) at 6,400 rpm and 19.0 kg⋅m (186 N⋅m) of torque. The engine was originally available in particular in the Toyota Camry/Vista Twin Cam 2000 (3S-GELU for V10s, 3S-GE for V20s) and Toyota Corona *T150 (limited chassis version - ST162 with 3S-GELU).

==== Generation 2 ====
The second generation was produced from 1990 to 1993, receiving a slight boost in output to 165 PS (121 kW) at 6,800 rpm in Japanese specifications, 156 PS (115 kW) at 6,600 rpm in European markets. Peak torque went to 191 N⋅m (141 lb⋅ft) at 4,800 rpm, 186 N⋅m (137 lb⋅ft) in Europe. It also proved to be a slightly more reliable engine. The second generation also did away with the T-VIS system, which was replaced by the ACIS (Acoustic Control Induction System), proving to be much more efficient. T-VIS was, however, retained on the second-generation 3S-GTE, the turbocharged counterpart.

==== Generation 3 ====
The third-generation 3S-GE was produced from 1994 to 1999. Power output for the Japanese market was increased to 180 PS (132 kW; 178 hp) as the compression ratio was increased to 10.3:1, while motors for other markets received a minor revision in 1996 for emissions (EGR) which reduced power output slightly to 170 PS (125 kW; 168 hp) at 7,000 rpm. Torque remains the same for both at 19.5 kg⋅m (191 N⋅m).

==== Generation 4 ====
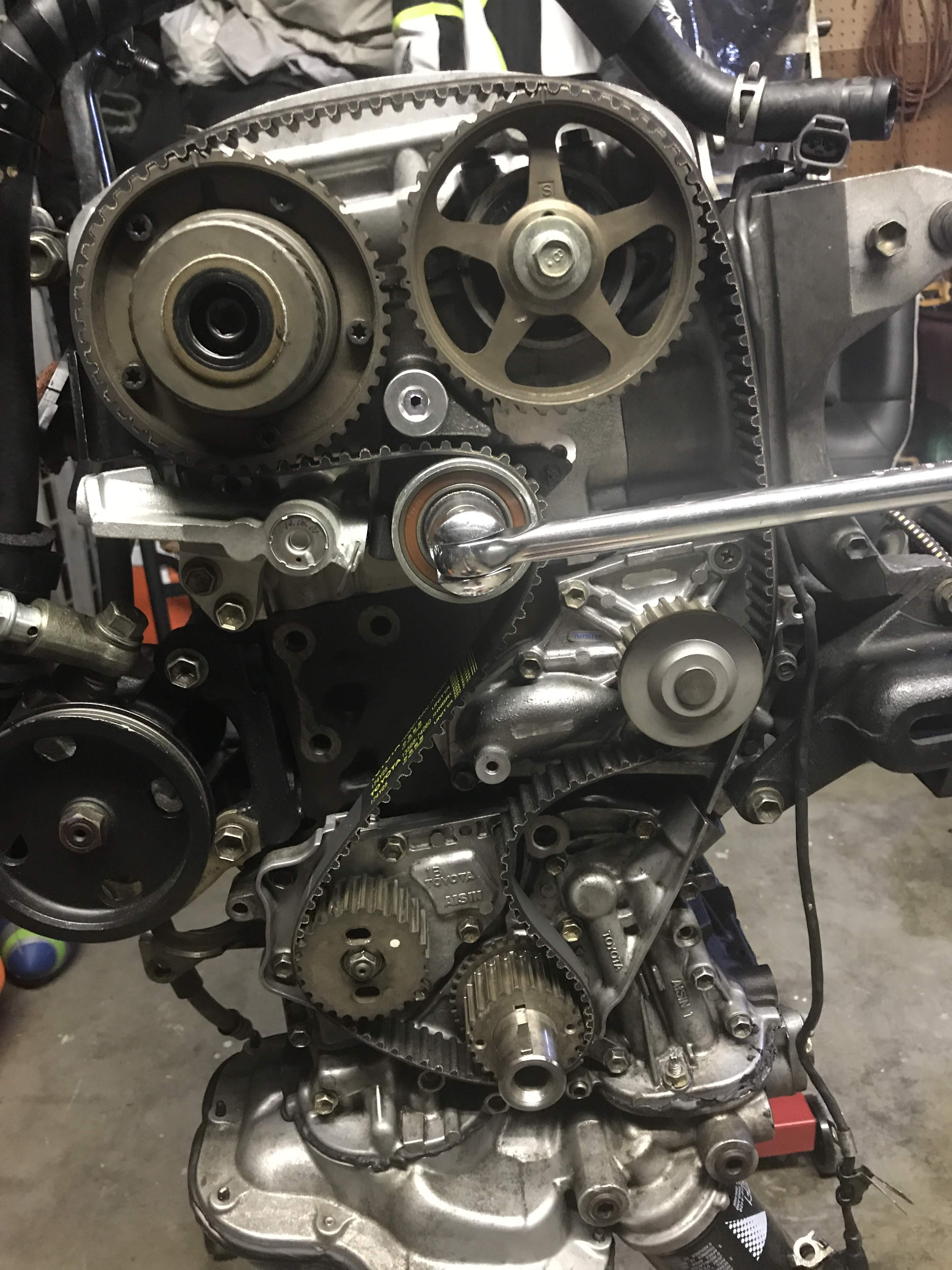
Timing belt on a fourth generation 3S-GE

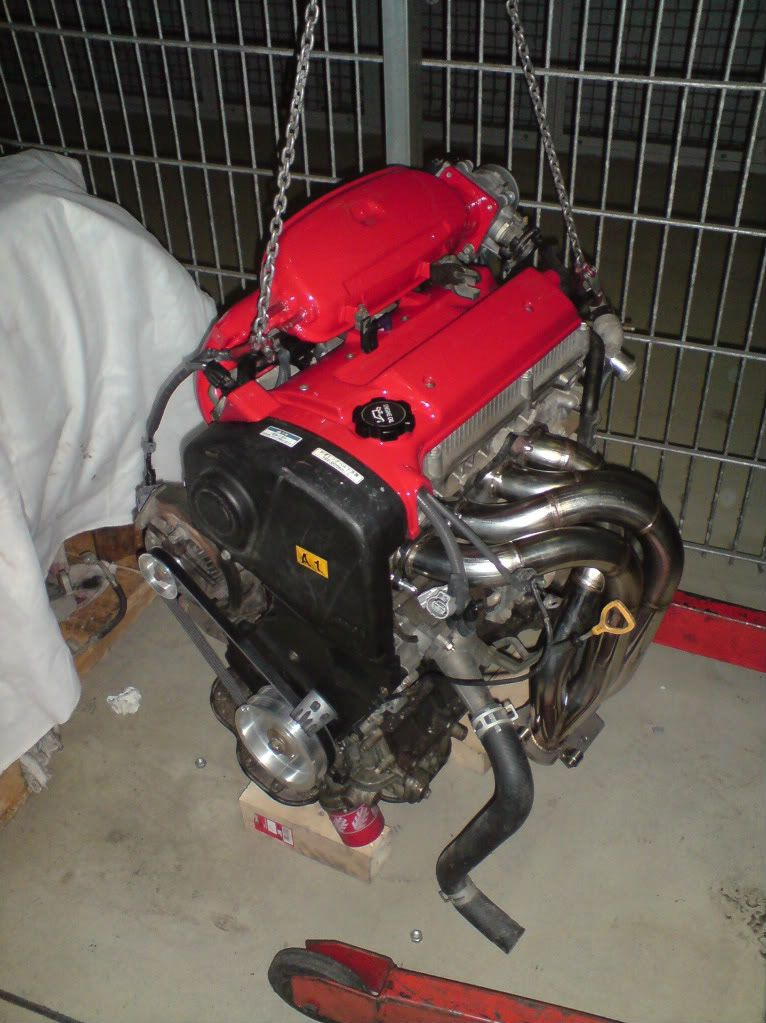
Fourth generation 3S-GE

The fourth-generation 3S-GE, also known as the 'Red Top BEAMS' 3S-GE began production in 1997. BEAMS is an acronym which stands for Breakthrough Engine with Advanced Mechanism System. The first version was equipped with VVT-i and produced 200 PS (147 kW; 197 hp) at 7,000 rpm when coupled to a manual transmission. The automatic version produced 190 PS (140 kW; 187 bhp) at 7000 rpm; this is believed to be an ECU restriction implemented by Toyota due to gearbox limitations. It was available in a few models sold only in Japan: the MR2 G and G-Limited and the Celica ST202 SS-II and SS-III.

The second version generation 4 3S-GE, the 'Grey Top BEAMS' 3S-GE, was an available engine option in the RAV4 and second-generation Caldina Active Sports GT in Japan. Even though the valve cover on this engine is black, it is referred to as the "Grey Top", taking its name from the grey intake plenum colouring. This naming is as such to differentiate it from the fifth-generation Dual-VVTi "Black Top" in the Altezza. Power output is 180 PS (132 kW; 178 hp) at 6,600 rpm in the RAV4 and 190 PS (140 kW; 187 hp) in the Caldina GT. The mechanical differences between the Red Top and Grey Top are the exhaust manifold and the ECU. Wiring is identical.

The bottom end is shared with the gen 4 3S-GTE aside from higher compression pistons. Casting provisions exist in the heads for Exhaust VVT solenoid, and RWD water gallery is open, behind the alternator mount. Rear oil drain at the back of the head is in a different position.

Gen 4 also runs a manual throttle body.

This engine was used in some TTE WRC Corollas (modified for Turbo).

==== Generation 5 ====
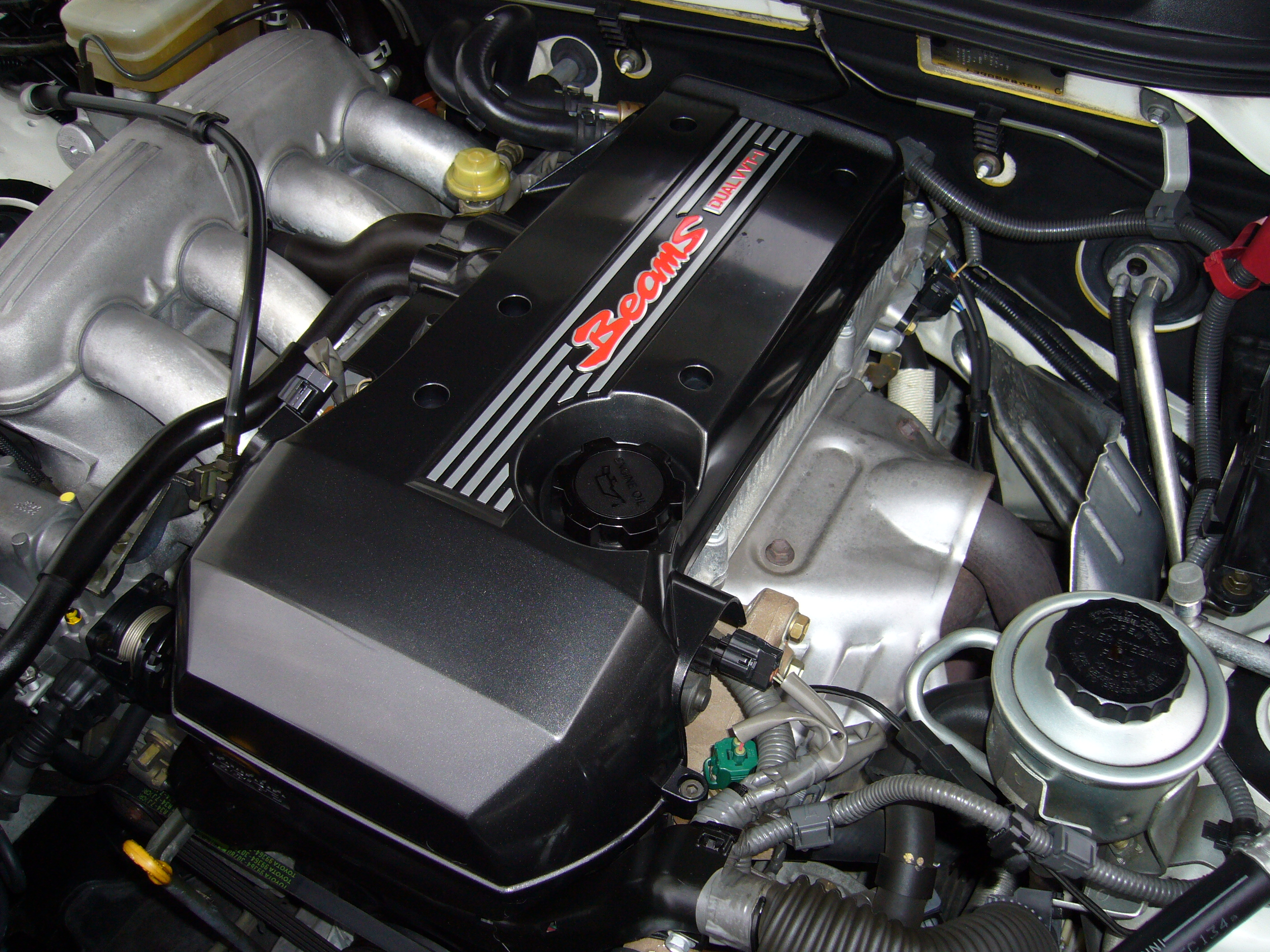
BEAMS 3S-GE 5th-generation engine ("Black Top")

In 1998, the fifth and final version of the 3S-GE was released, found only in the Japanese-delivered Altezza RS200. The 'Black Top' as it came to be referred to as, was fitted with a dual VVT-i system that adjusted timing on both intake and exhaust camshafts and came in two different spec levels dependent on which transmission it was coupled to. Compression ratio was raised to 11.5:1 and rods and pistons were lightened for a higher redline.

Gen 5 uses electronic controlled throttle with cable (semi-drive by wire), so no idle speed controller is required. A returnless fuel rail is also used.

The MT version that came equipped with the J160 6-speed manual transmission featured larger diameter titanium intake valves measuring 35mm, larger exhaust valves measuring 29.5mm also made from titanium, a larger 33mm bucket, and stiffer valve springs. It made 210 PS (154 kW; 207 hp) at 7,600 rpm and 22.0 kg⋅m (216 N⋅m) at 6,400 rpm.

Compared to the MT version, the 5-speed AT version came equipped with the A650E 5Super ECT (with manual shift mode) automatic transmission, a less aggressive cam profile, smaller steel-alloy valves and smaller 31mm buckets. This engine made 200 PS (147 kW; 197 hp) at 7,000 rpm and 22.0 kg⋅m (216 N⋅m) at 4,800 rpm. The MT and AT versions produce equal peak torque, however, the AT version achieves this at 4,800 rpm, with the MT version achieving this at 6,400 rpm. Externally, the AT model can be identified by differences in the wiring loom and the lack of an acoustic blanket on the intake plenum.

==== Specifications ====
3S-GE Specifications
	Gen 1	Gen 2	Gen 3	Gen 4	Gen 5 AT	Gen 5 MT
Capacity	1,998 cc (2.0 L)					
Bore × Stroke	86 mm (3.39 in) × 86 mm (3.39 in)					
Variable Performance Mechanism	T-VIS	ACIS		VVT-i	Dual VVT-i	
Compression Ratio	9.2:1	10:1	10.3:1	11:1	11.5:1	
Valve Material	Steel-Alloy					Titanium
Intake Valve Diameter	33.5 mm (1.32 in)			34.5 mm (1.36 in)	34.5 mm (1.36 in)	35 mm (1.38 in)
Exhaust Valve Diameter	29.0 mm (1.14 in)			29.5 mm (1.16 in)	29.5 mm (1.16 in)	29.5 mm (1.16 in)
Included Valve Angle	25 °			22.5 °		

=== 3S-GTE ===
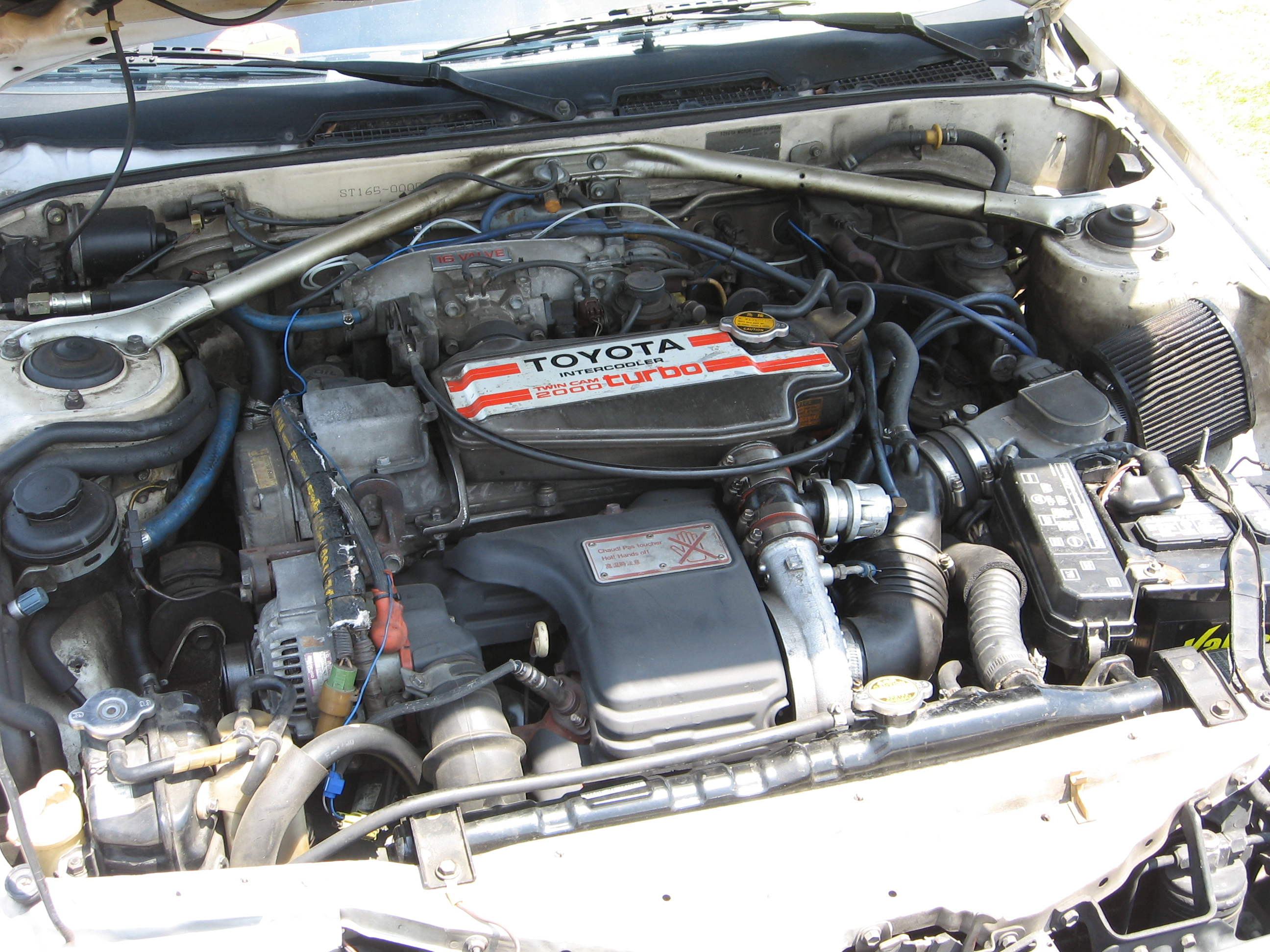
Toyota 3S-GTE engine in a Celica ST165.

The 3S-GTE is an in-line 4-cylinder 1,998 cc (2.0 L; 121.9 cu in) engine from Toyota, based on the 3S-GE with the addition of under piston oil squirters and a reduced compression ratio to accommodate the addition of a turbocharger.

There are four generations of this engine, which started manufacture in 1986 and was built until 2007. The turbochargers used in the 3S-GTE engines are Toyota designs and use an internal wastegate design. Depending on where the engine was intended to be sold the exhaust turbine is either ceramic (Japan) or steel (US and Australia). It was fitted to the MR2 (North America and Japan only. There is no official MR2 for the European market with this engine.), Toyota Celica GT-Four, and the Caldina GT-T and GT-Four.

3S-GTE usage in Toyotas
Generation	Year	Model	Power	Torque
1	1986–1989	Celica ST165	185 PS (136 kW; 182 hp) @ 6000 rpm; 190 hp (142 kW; 193 PS) @ 6000 rpm (North America)	250 N⋅m (184 lbf⋅ft) @ 4000 rpm; 258 N⋅m (190 lbf⋅ft) @ 4000 rpm (North America)
2	1990–1993	Celica ST185; MR2 (1990–1992 Turbo); MR2 (North America 1991 1995)	200 hp (149 kW; 203 PS) @ 6000 rpm (North America); 205 hp (153 kW; 208 PS) @ 6000 rpm (European Carlos Sainz/Australia Group A Rallye); 225 PS (165 kW; 222 hp) @ 6000 rpm (Japan, GT-Four & GT-Four Rally, MR2); 235 PS (173 kW; 232 hp) @ 6000 rpm (Japan, GT-Four RC)	271 N⋅m (200 lbf⋅ft) @ 3200 rpm (North America); 281 N⋅m (207 lbf⋅ft) @ 3200 rpm (UK); 275 N⋅m (203 lbf⋅ft) @ 3200 rpm (Group A Rallye); 304 N⋅m (224 lbf⋅ft) @ 3200 rpm (Japan, ST185/MR2); 304 N⋅m (224 lbf⋅ft) @ 4000 rpm (Japan, GT-Four RC)
3	1994–1999	Celica ST205; MR2 (Japan, 1993+ Turbo)	245 PS (180 kW; 242 hp) @ 6000 rpm (MR2); 244 PS (179 kW; 241 hp) @ 6000 rpm (Japan, ST205)	302 N⋅m (223 lbf⋅ft) @ 4000 rpm (ST205 Group A); 304 N⋅m (224 lbf⋅ft) @ 4000 rpm
4	1997–2001	Caldina ST215 (GT-T)	260 PS (191 kW; 256 hp) @ 6200 rpm	324 N⋅m (239 lbf⋅ft) @ 4400 rpm
4.5	2002–2007	Caldina ST246 (GT-Four)	260 PS (191 kW; 256 hp) @ 6200 rpm	324 N⋅m (239 lbf⋅ft) @ 4400 rpm

Its cylinders are numbered 1-2-3-4, cylinder number 1 is beside the timing belt. The Dual Over Head Cam (DOHC) 16-valve cylinder head designed by Yamaha is made of aluminum alloy. The pent-roof combustion chambers are complemented by a cross flow intake and exhaust layout. Spark plugs are located in the middle of the combustion chambers. A distributor based system is used to fire the cylinders in a 1-3-4-2 order.

The crankshaft, located within the crankcase, rotates on five aluminum alloy bearings and is balanced by eight weights. Oil holes are located in the middle of the crankshaft to provide oil to the connecting rods, bearing, pistons and various other components.

A single timing belt drives the intake and exhaust camshaft along with the oil and water pumps. The cam journal is supported on 5 points between the valve lifters of each cylinder and on the front of the cylinder head. The cam journals are lubricated by oiler port located in the middle of the camshaft. To adjust the valve clearance in the first two generations, a shim over bucket system is employed. In the following generations a shim under bucket system is used.

The pistons are made from an aluminum alloy designed to withstand high temperatures. An indentation is incorporated into the pistons to prevent the pistons from hitting the valves if the timing belt breaks. Piston pins holding the pistons in place are locked by snap rings.

The first compression ring and the oil ring is made of steel, the second compression ring is made of cast iron. Compression ring 1 and 2, prevents gas leakages from the combustion chamber while the oil ring works to clear oil off the cylinder walls, preventing any excessive oil from entering the combustion chamber.

==== First Generation ====
The first-generation Toyota CT26 utilized a single entry turbine housing and a single wastegate port design. It was fitted to the first generation Toyota Celica GT-Four (ST165). The intake charge was cooled by a water-to-air intercooler and the intake manifold design is Toyota's T-VIS. It has 8 independent ports and benefits from the inertia build up to improve engine torque at low and medium speeds by closing 4 ports below a certain RPM and throttle position to increase air speed and maximize fuel atomization and opening all 8 at higher engine loads for better air volume. Air metering is through an air flow meter and there is no factory BPV/BOV in this generation. Fuel delivery is through 430 cc injectors while air is fed through a 55 mm (2.2 in) throttle body and 7.15 mm (0.281 in) intake and exhaust valve lift. Compression ratio is 8.5:1 and produces 182–190 hp (136–142 kW; 185–193 PS) and 190 lb⋅ft (258 N⋅m) with a factory 8-9 psi of boost. Fuel cut is at 12 psi.

==== Second Generation ====
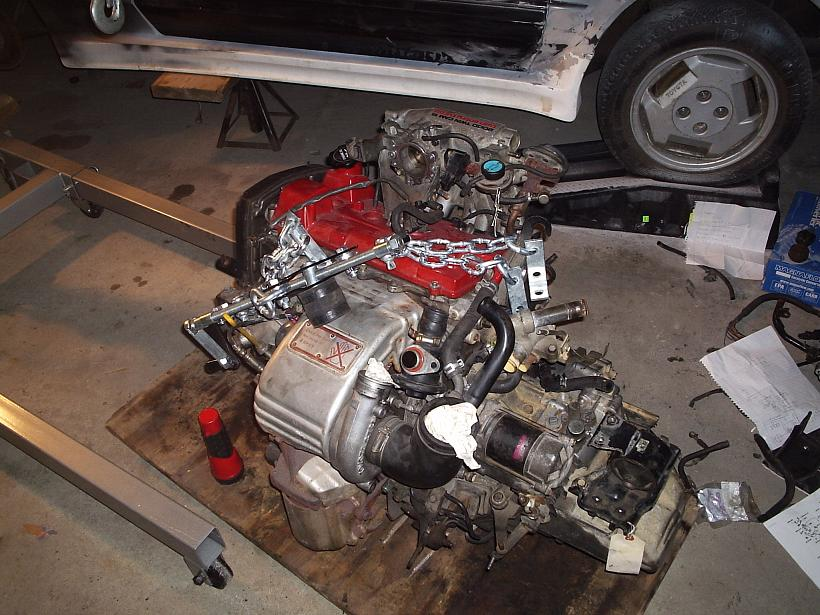
A second-generation 3S-GTE

The second-generation Toyota CT26 used a twin entry turbine housing with dual wastegate ports. It was fitted to the second generation Toyota Celica GT-Four (ST185) as well as the Toyota MR2 Turbo (SW20). The intake charge is cooled by an air-to-air intercooler either top-mounted in the Celica or side-mounted in the MR2. The rally homologation Celica (known as GT-Four RC in Japan, Group A Rallye in Australia, or Carlos Sainz Limited Edition in Europe) used a top-mounted water-to-air intercooler and is distinguished by a hood vent rather than a hood scoop as found in the non-homologation ST185s. This generation retains the T-VIS intake manifold and the Air Flow Meter. A factory BPV is included in the SW20 MR2 Turbo but not on the Celicas. Compression ratio is 8.8:1 and produces 200–232 hp (149–173 kW; 203–235 PS) and 200–224 lb⋅ft (271–304 N⋅m). This generation retains the injector size and throttle body size from the previous generation. However, boost is increased to 10-11 psi in the ST185 and MR2 while it is increased to 16 psi in the ST185RC. Intake and exhaust valve lift is significantly increased to 8.2 mm (0.32 in).

==== Third Generation ====
The third-generation engine uses the Toyota C20b turbo, which was of the same design as the second-generation but with a slightly improved turbine housing and larger compressor wheel. A factory BPV is installed on all applications. The intake charge is cooled by a water-to-air top-mounted intercooler similar in shape to the ST185RC WTA. One can tell the difference as the ST205 WTA is black while the ST185 WTA is silver with a black centre. This generation does away with T-VIS and uses a normal 4 runner intake with the same port shape and size as the NA engine (but with larger injector holes for side feed). The Air Flow Meter is also removed in favor of a MAP sensing system (prior generations used a MAP sensor only for the purpose of the factory boost gauge and determining overboost fuel cut). Various increases included injector size (540 cc), boost (13 psi), overboost fuel cut limit (18 psi), intake cam lift (8.7 mm [0.34 in]), throttle body size (60 mm [2.4 in]), and a 10 mm (0.39 in) increase in exhaust ports. Exhaust valve lift is retained at 8.2 mm (0.32 in). In late 1997, the block casting was revised with added support around the head to prevent block cracking problems. The C20b turbo found in this generation is backwards compatible with the second generation motors, however not the first generation. Further improvements include a factory oil catch can. Compression is reduced down to 8.5:1 however power is improved to 245–255 PS (180–188 kW; 242–252 hp) and 304 N⋅m (224 lbf⋅ft).

==== Fourth Generation ====
The fourth-generation engine uses a proprietary CT15B turbocharger. This generation was used in the Toyota Caldina GT-T AWD Wagon (ST215). The exhaust housing is actually cast into the cylinder exhaust manifold, rather than the normal practice of a separate turbine housing after the cylinder exhaust manifold. Due to this, the CT15 is backwards compatible with the third-generation 3S-GTE cylinder head only, not either the first or second generation. Intake charge was cooled by an air-to-air top-mounted intercooler fed through a new side-feed intake manifold. This generation utilizes a coil-on-plug ignition system and 550 cc injectors. Boost remains at 13-14 psi, however overboost fuel cut is increased to 21 psi. Compression is increased to 9:1 and produces 260 PS (191 kW; 256 hp) and 324 N⋅m (239 lbf⋅ft).

==== Fifth Generation ====
The fifth-generation engine uses the same turbo as the fourth generation model. This generation was used in the Toyota Caldina GT-Four (ST246). There are only minor differences to this engine compared to the previous version and due to only limited markets receiving the ST246, very little is known and very few are aware of the engine. Differences include longer injectors to be closer to the intake ports. The intake manifold returns to a center-feed type fed by an air-to-air top-mounted intercooler. This intercooler is slightly smaller than the previous generation and is oriented slightly different than any of the previous generations. It is tilted more towards the front of the car. The coil-on-plug ignition is different in this generation and it is not compatible with the ST215 ECU. The valve cover is different as for the first time in the 3S-GTE series as the oil filler hole is on top of the exhaust camshaft instead of the intake. Other differences include the first time that there is no oil cooler in this generation as well as OBD2 diagnostics. Despite the downsize in various components of this generation, power is retained at 260 PS (191 kW; 256 hp) and 324 N⋅m (239 lbf⋅ft).

==== Specifications ====
3S-GTE Specifications
	Gen 1	Gen 2	Gen 3	Gen 4	Gen 4.5
Capacity	1,998 cc (2.0 L; 121.9 cu in)				
Bore × Stroke	86 mm × 86 mm (3.39 in × 3.39 in)				
Variable Performance Mechanism	T-VIS		Traditional		
Ignition	Distributor			Coil-on-Plug	
Compression Ratio	8.5:1	8.8:1	8.5:1	9.0:1	9.0:1
Valve Material	Steel-Alloy			Heat-Treated Steel with Nitride	
Intake Valve Diameter	33.5 mm (1.32 in)				
Exhaust Valve Diameter	29.0 mm (1.14 in)				
Intake Valve Lift	7.15 mm (0.281 in)	8.2 mm (0.32 in)	8.7 mm (0.34 in)	8.75 mm (0.344 in)	8.4 mm (0.33 in)
Exhaust Valve Lift	7.15 mm (0.281 in)	8.2 mm (0.32 in)			
Injector Size	Top-Feed 430 cc	Side-Feed 430 cc	Side-Feed 540 cc	Top-Feed 540 cc	Extended length Top-Feed 540 cc
Turbo (All Single Turbo)	Single-Entry CT26	Dual-Entry CT26	Dual-Entry CT20b	Cast-in-manifold Single-Entry CT15B	
Intake Manifold	Center Feed			Side Feed	Center Feed
Intercooler	WTA TMIC	ATA TMIC/SMIC (ST185RC - WTA)	WTA TMIC/SMIC	ATA TMIC	
Factory Boost	8–9 psi (0.55–0.62 bar)	10–11 psi (0.69–0.76 bar)	13 psi (0.90 bar)		
Fuel Cut	12 psi (0.83 bar); ST185RC - 16 psi (1.1 bar)		18 psi (1.2 bar)	21 psi (1.4 bar)	

=== 503E ===
The 503E was used to power a number of Toyota Sports cars, including the Toyota 88C Group C entry and the All American Racers-built Eagle HF89/HF90 and Eagle MkIII IMSA Grand Touring Prototypes. It was hand-built by Toyota Racing Development in Torrance, California and produced up to 600 kW (800 bhp). The 3S-GTE was later based on its design. They are similar engines, though not identical.

The Toyota TOM'S Supra GT500 race car used a version of the 3S-GTE known as the 3S-GT, another name for the 503E which was detuned to 360 kW (480 bhp), in accordance to the regulations of GT500 at the time. This was due to the Supra's conventional engine, the 2JZ, being deemed as too front-heavy for the race car.

== 4S ==
The 4S is a 1.8 L (1,838 cc), a narrower bore version of the 3S (82.5 × 86.0 mm). This was essentially a multi-valve, twin cam replacement for the 1.8-litre 1S series, with parallel differences as those between the 2S and 3S. There were both 4S-Fi (central point fuel injection) and 4S-FE (multi-point fuel injection) versions.

=== 4S-Fi ===
105 PS (77 kW; 104 hp) and 149 N⋅m (110 lb⋅ft), central-point fuel injection.

Applications

- 1988–1989 Toyota Carina ED (ST163)
- 1989–1990 Toyota Carina ED/Corona EXiV (ST180/181)
- 1987-1989 Toyota Corona ST170
- 1988–1992 Toyota Camry (SV22)
- 1988-1990 Toyota Cresta (SX80)
- 1988-1990 Toyota Mark II (SX80)
- 1988-1990 Toyota Chaser (SX80)

=== 4S-FE ===
Applications

- 1989–1992 Toyota Carina (ST170)
- 1992–1996 Toyota Carina (ST190)
- 1989–1992 Toyota Corona (ST170)
- 1992–1996 Toyota Corona (ST190)
- 1990–1993 Toyota Carina ED/Corona EXiV (ST180/181)
- 1993–1998 Toyota Carina ED/Corona EXiV (ST200/201)
- 1991-2001 Toyota Cresta (SX80/SX90/SX100)
- 1991-2001 Toyota Mark II (SX80/SX90/SX100)
- 1991-2001 Toyota Chaser (SX80/SX90/SX100)
- 1996–2001 Toyota Comfort (SXS11Y)
- 1997–2001 Toyota Chaser (SX100)

== 5S ==
The 5S engine was essentially the same basic design as the 3S, but features a slightly increased bore and an increased stroke (87.1 × 90.9 mm). The total displacement was thus increased to 2.2 L (2,164 cc). It was used in the fifth- and sixth-generation Celica, the second-generation MR2, the third- and fourth-generation Camry, as well as the first-generation Camry Solara. Like the 3S, the 5S is of a non-interference design to prevent the pistons from striking the valves in case of a timing belt failure.

=== 5S-FE ===
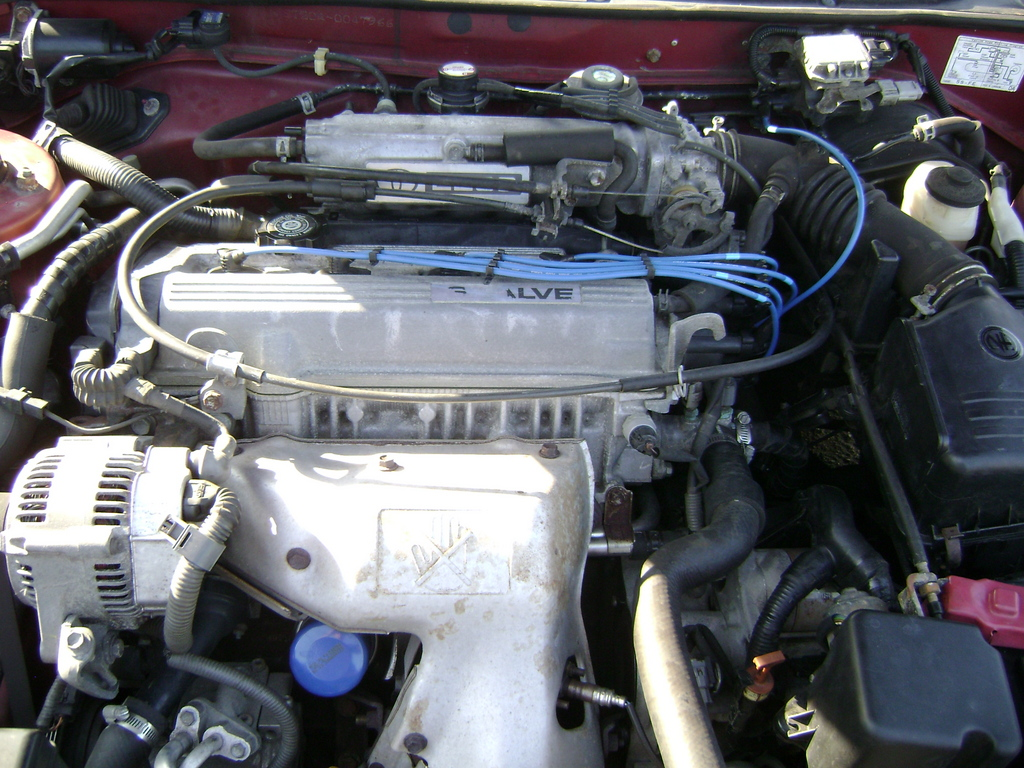
A 5S-FE Engine in a 1998 Toyota Celica GT

The 5S-FE was available in several variations each being distinguished by valve cover design. The first generation, introduced in the 1990–92 Celica GT/GT-S and MR2, had a power rating of 130 hp and 144 lb ft of torque. The second generation was introduced in 1993 with the fifth generation (ST184) Celica, and continued through the sixth generation (ST204) Celica. The second generation was also used in the MR2 (SW21) and Camry/Scepter (XV10) series and had a power output of 135 hp and 145 lb ft of torque. It had slightly less aggressive cams, no cold start injector, a knock sensor, and more aggressive tuning to give it slightly more power. In states that had adopted California emission standards the 5S-FE was rated at 130 hp and 145 lb ft of torque due mainly to emission equipment used to meet those emission regulations. The third generation was the last 5S-FE engine produced and was used in the 1997–01 Camry XV20 and 1999–01 Camry Solara; however, from 1996 onward, the engine received a crank angle sensor instead of a cam angle sensor for a smoother idle. From 1997 to 1999 the engine produced 133 hp at 5,200 rpm and 147 lb ft of torque at 4,400 rpm. From 2000 to 2001, the engine received modest improvements to increase power output to 136 hp at 5,200 rpm and 150 lb ft of torque at 4,400 rpm. The 5S-FE was replaced in all applications by the 2.4 L 2AZ-FE.

California specification 1994-1996 5S-FEs in the Celica and Camry used air-assisted, 250 cc injectors, and sequential fuel injection for reduced emissions over the grouped (2+2) firing scheme. The 1994-1995 MR2 did not receive this change, nor did Camrys/Celicas in federal emissions states.

Camry 5S-FEs have a counter-rotating balance shaft assembly to reduce noise, vibration, and harshness. These reduce the second order vibrations common to four-cylinder engines by spinning at twice the crankshaft speed. The 1994-1999 Celica and 1991-1995 MR2 5S-FEs lack these balance shafts, so any 5S-FE engine with balance shafts likely came from a Camry.

In 1997, for the fourth generation Camry, the 5S-FE was updated for the last time. This engine received a direct ignition system with external camshaft and crankshaft sensors. This system used a wasted-spark design, and the coils had integrated igniters. The engine did not use a typical coil-on-plug design, but rather two coil+igniter assemblies mounted near cylinder four, and provided spark via normal high-tension cords (spark plug wires). This change means that the 1997-01 Camry 5S-FE has a blocked off distributor mounting hole and could be used with older 5S-FEs without swapping cylinder heads.

The 1997-99 Camry 5S-FE continued with the air-assisted, 250 cc injectors. The Camry 5S-FE also had a factory 4-to-1 exhaust design - in Federal form, it had no pre-catalyst, although the California version did replace the collector design of the Federal version with a warm-up pre-catalyst for reduced cold start emissions.

For 2000 Toyota removed the air-assisted injectors and moved to superfine atomization (~50 micrometers), 12-hole, 235 cc injectors made by Denso. They are of a different design, and required a change in the cylinder head casting.

For 2001 Toyota started fitting factory MLS (multi-layer steel) head gaskets and other metal gaskets layered with Viton to engines, including the 5S-FE. MLS head gaskets require cylinder head and cylinder block resurfacing on older engines to ensure proper sealing; consequently, the MLS head gasket did not supersede the old composite head gasket.

The 1994 through 1999 Celica 5S-FE was not updated with these changes, and continued to use a distributor and the older electronic control system and injectors.

The 5S-FE has a 9.5:1 compression ratio.

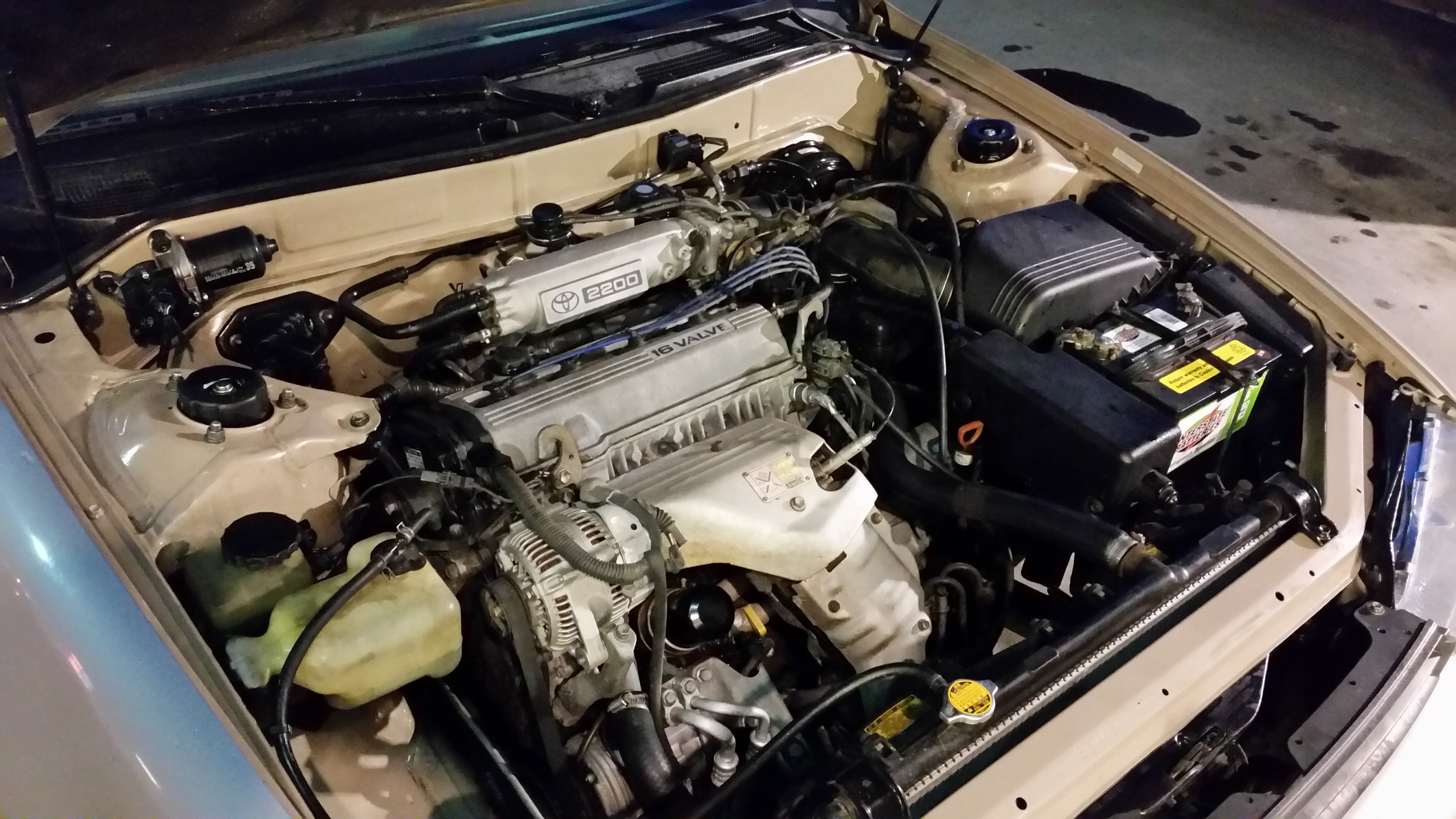
5S-FE engine in a 1994 Camry LE.

Year	Power	Torque
1990–92	130 bhp (97 kW) at 5,400 rpm	144 lb⋅ft (195 N⋅m) at 4,400 rpm
1993–96	135 bhp (101 kW) at 5,400 rpm	145 lb⋅ft (197 N⋅m) at 4,400 rpm
1997–99	133 bhp (99 kW) at 5,400 rpm	147 lb⋅ft (199 N⋅m) at 4,400 rpm
2000–01	136 bhp (101 kW) at 5,400 rpm	150 lb⋅ft (203 N⋅m) at 4,400 rpm

Applications

- ST184 (5th generation US Celica GT and GT-S, Australian Celica SX)
- ST204 (6th generation US Celica GT)
- SW21 (2nd generation US MR2 N/A)
- SXV10 (Camry 1992–96)
- SXV20 (Camry 1997–01)
- SXU10 (Harrier 1997–00)

=== 5S-FNE ===
Essentially a CNG version of the 5S-FE. This engine was fitted to the XV20 Camry in California to fleet customers in 1999.

== See also ==
- List of Toyota engines

== Bibliography ==
- Yamaguchi, Jack K. (1985). Lösch, Annamaria (ed.). "Lucrative Contraction". World Cars 1985. Pelham, NY: The Automobile Club of Italy/Herald Books: 391, 393, 395. ISBN 0-910714-17-7.
