= Toyota G engine =

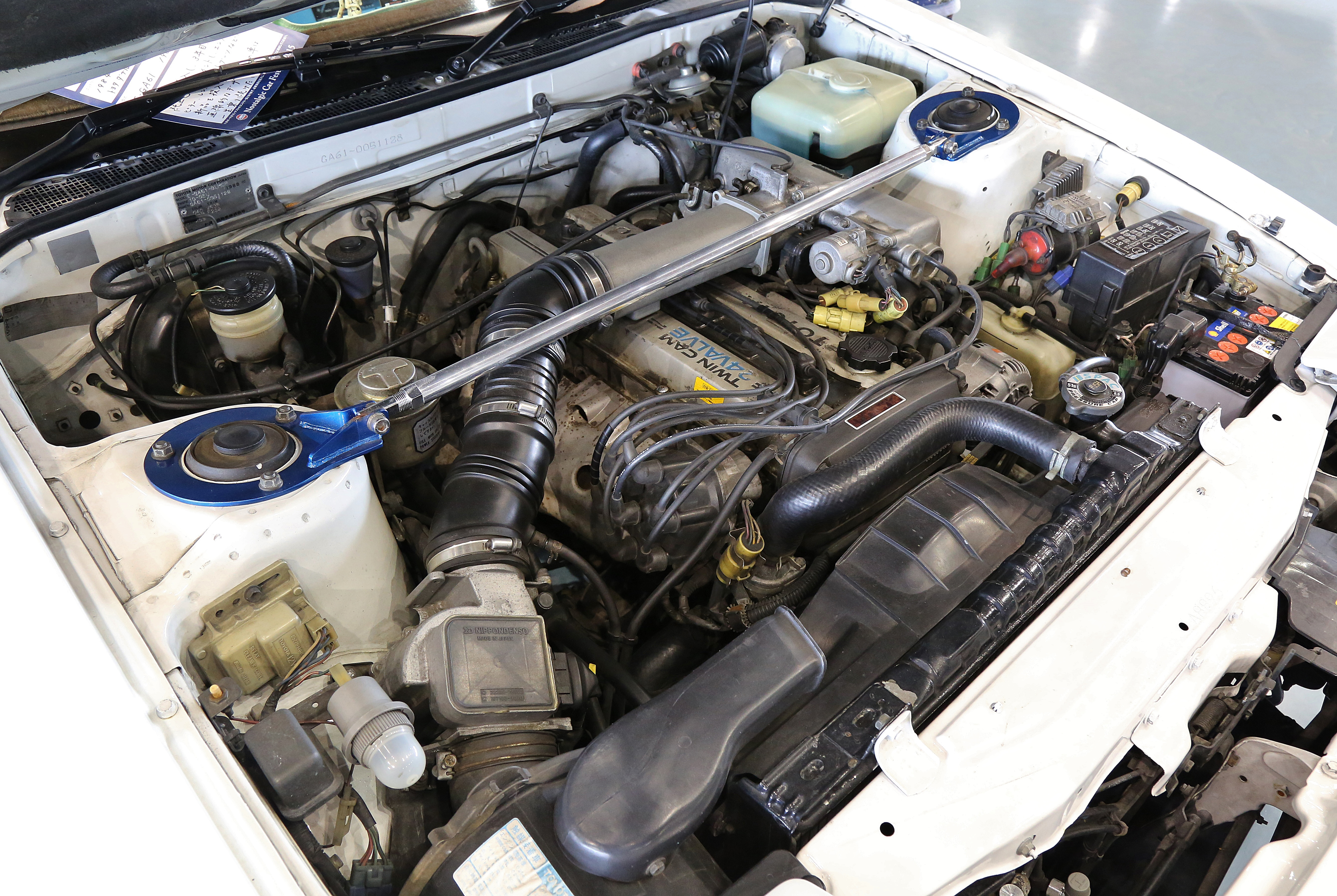
- 1G-GEU engine in a Toyota Supra GA61

Overview
- Manufacturer: Toyota Motor Corporation
- Production: 1967–1968; 1979–2008

Layout
- Configuration: Straight-6
- Displacement: 2.0 L (1,988 cc; 121.3 cu in)
- Cylinder bore: 75 mm (2.95 in)
- Piston stroke: 75 mm (2.95 in)
- Cylinder block material: Cast iron
- Cylinder head material: Aluminum
- Valvetrain: SOHC 2 valves x cyl. DOHC 4 valves x cyl. with VVT-i (since 1998)
- Valvetrain drive system: Belt-driven

Combustion
- Supercharger: Toyota SC-14 (1G-GZE)
- Turbocharger: Toyota CT-12 Intercooled
- Fuel system: Multi-port fuel injection
- Fuel type: Gasoline
- Cooling system: Water-cooled

Output
- Power output: 100–210 PS (74–154 kW; 99–207 hp)
- Torque output: 152–275 N⋅m (112–203 lb⋅ft; 15–28 kg⋅m)

The Toyota Motor Corporation G-family engine is a family of straight-6 piston engines produced from 1979 to 2008. It is notable in that only a single displacement, 2.0 L (1,988 cc), was produced in this series. Initially belt-driven OHC non-interference engines (except the VVT-i version which is an interference engine), multivalve DOHC (except the 1G-EU SOHC 12 valve engine) and variable valve timing were added later during the production run. The 1G-GEU was Toyota's first mass produced four-valve twincam engine. A prototype version of the 1G-GEU called the LASREα–X, featuring twin-turbos, variable valve timing and intake as well as variable displacement, was fitted to the Toyota FX-1 show car at the 1983 Tokyo Motor Show. It showcased a number of technologies which were later to become commonplace. This engine was designed around the new LASRE technology for lighter weight – such as sintered hollow camshafts. These engines were used as a lower-displacement alternative to the more upmarket M family and JZ family straight-sixes.

For ten months (in 1967-1968), Toyota also offered Hino's GR100 engine as the "Toyota G" in the shortlived Briska light truck.

== G (Hino GR100) ==
After Toyota's takeover of Hino Motors in 1967, the Briska one-tonne truck was sold with Toyota badging for ten months. The engine code was changed from Hino's "GR100" to "G" for these cars. The engine is a 1251 cc watercooled OHV inline-four with distant Renault origins and was originally developed by Hino for their Contessa passenger car. Bore and stroke are 71 mm × 79 mm (2.80 in × 3.11 in), maximum power 63 PS (46 kW) at 5500 rpm. Hino's earlier variants of this engine had a variety of power outputs, ranging from 52 to 65 PS.

Apart from its name, this engine is unrelated to the later series of Toyota G engines.

== 1G ==
Since just one displacement was offered, all G-family engines are marked 1G and share the same "square" 75 mm (2.95 in) bore and stroke.

Applications:

- Toyota Soarer
- Toyota Celica Supra
- Toyota Crown
- Toyota Crown Comfort/Crown Sedan
- Toyota Cressida/Mark II/Cresta/Chaser
- Toyota Altezza
- Lexus IS200

=== 1G-E ===
The export-spec two-valve 1G-E had no emissions controls and were used in commercial vehicles and for a few export markets, mostly southeast Asia. Typical specifications:

- 80 kW (109 PS; 107 hp) at 5000 rpm, 162 N⋅m (119 lb⋅ft) torque at 4000 rpm (Mark II, 1986, Indonesia)
- 100 PS (74 kW; 99 hp) at 5200 rpm, JDM Crown GS130/131/136V/130G

=== 1G-EU ===
The Japan-spec 1G-EU was produced from 1979 through 1988. This and the 1G-E are the only two-valve SOHC members of the family. Output was 105–125 hp (78–93 kW; 106–127 PS) at 5400 rpm and 157–172 N⋅m (116–127 lb⋅ft) at 4400 rpm.

=== 1G-FE ===
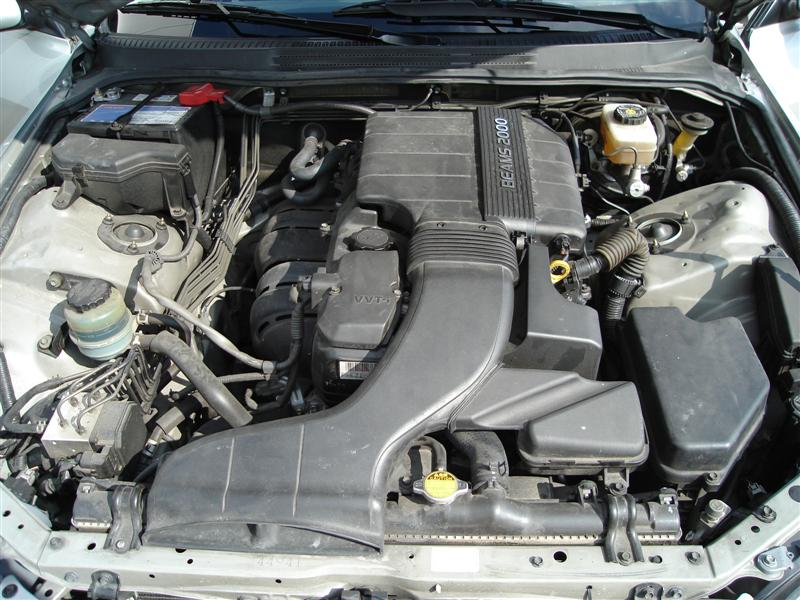
1G-FE

The DOHC 1G-FE uses a narrow valve angle and other fuel economy optimizations. It was introduced in 1988, it features a cast iron block with aluminum cylinder head and uses the slave cam system. Output was 135 PS (99 kW; 133 hp) at 5,600 rpm and 176 N⋅m (130 lb⋅ft) at 4,400 rpm. In 1998 VVT-i was added, which bumped output to 160 PS (118 kW; 158 hp) at 6,200 rpm and 200 N⋅m (148 lb⋅ft) at 4,400 rpm for the Altezza/IS 200. Production of this engine family ceased in 2008 after the discontinuation of the Crown Sedan mild hybrid.

Applications:

- Toyota Altezza/Lexus IS 200
- Toyota Crown
- Aug 2001–Aug 2008 Toyota Crown Sedan GBS12, GXS12
- Toyota Chaser/Mark II/Cresta
- Toyota Mark II Blit
- Toyota Verossa
- Toyota Supra GA70, "G" grade
- Toyota Soarer

=== 1G-GEU ===
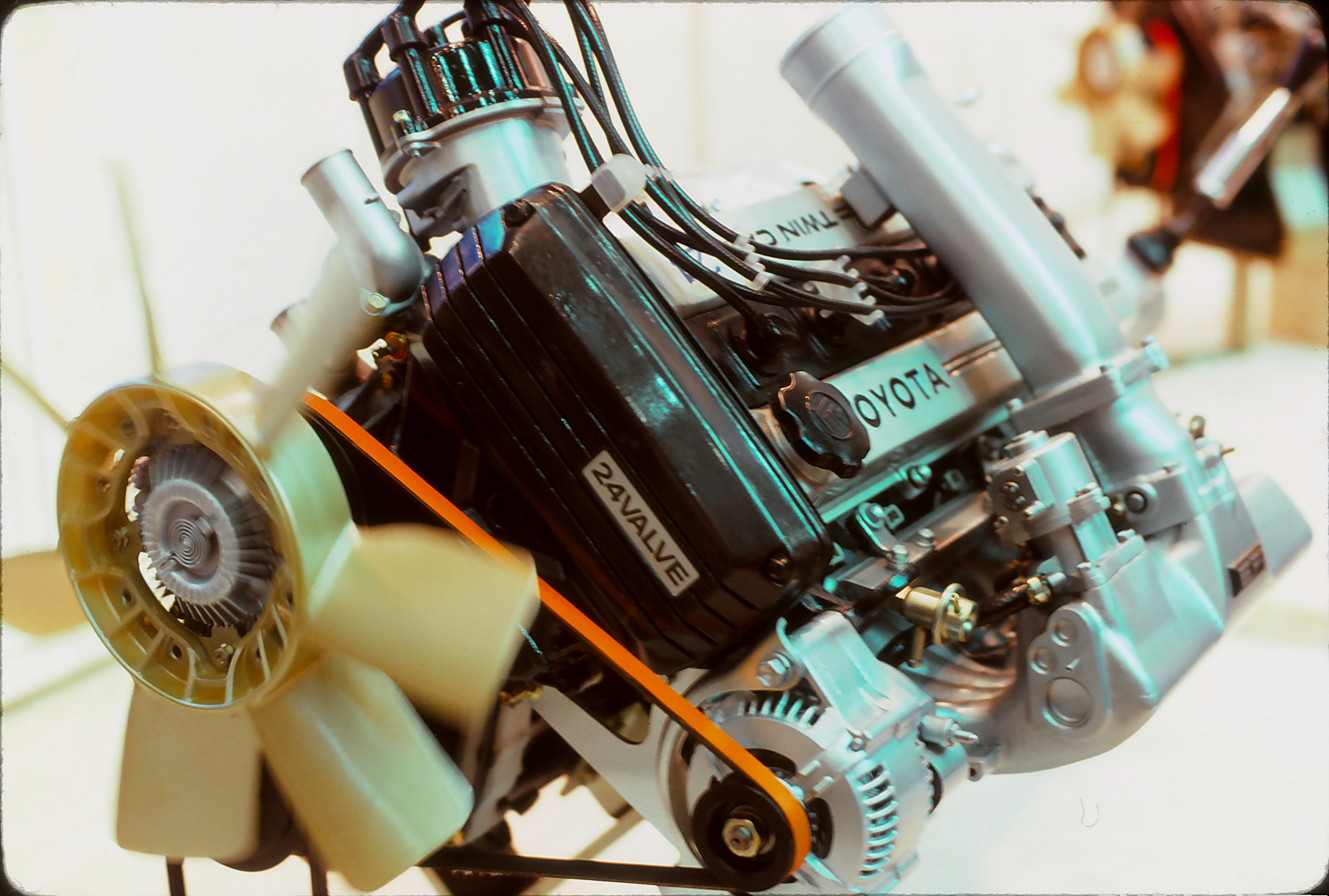
The 1G-GEU on display at the 1981 Tokyo Motor Show.

The 24-valve DOHC 1G-GEU was intended for high performance and featured a pent-roof combustion chamber. Introduced in August 1982 and produced through 1986, mostly for the Japanese market, it was Toyota's first multi-valve twincam engine to make it to the market, and won the "JSME Medal for New Technology" (Japan Society of Mechanical Engineers) in 1982. Output was 140–160 PS (103–118 kW; 138–158 hp) at 6,200 rpm and 162–181 N⋅m (119–133 lb⋅ft) at 5,600 rpm. To minimize the downsides of a multi-valve setup, the 1G-GEU was also equipped with T-VIS (Toyota Variable Induction System), increasing low to mid-engine speed torque. Like all following twin cam Toyotas, it used a timing belt rather than chain, for less noise and lower maintenance requirements. In August 1983, the fuel injection system was changed to EFI-D, which measures the pressure in the intake manifold to determine the proper air-fuel mixture.

Applications:

- Aug 1982–1985 Celica XX GA61
- Aug 1982–1992 Toyota Chaser/Mark II/Cresta
- Aug 1983–1995 Toyota Crown
- Feb 1983–1991 Toyota Soarer

=== 1G-GE ===
The 1G-GE replaced the 1G-GEU in 1988. It was detuned from 160 PS (118 kW; 158 hp) to 150 PS (110 kW; 148 hp) and served the same cars as 1G-GEU did. Torque was 182 N⋅m (135 lb⋅ft) at 5600 rpm. It was produced for the Supra GA70 until 1993.

=== 1G-GTE ===
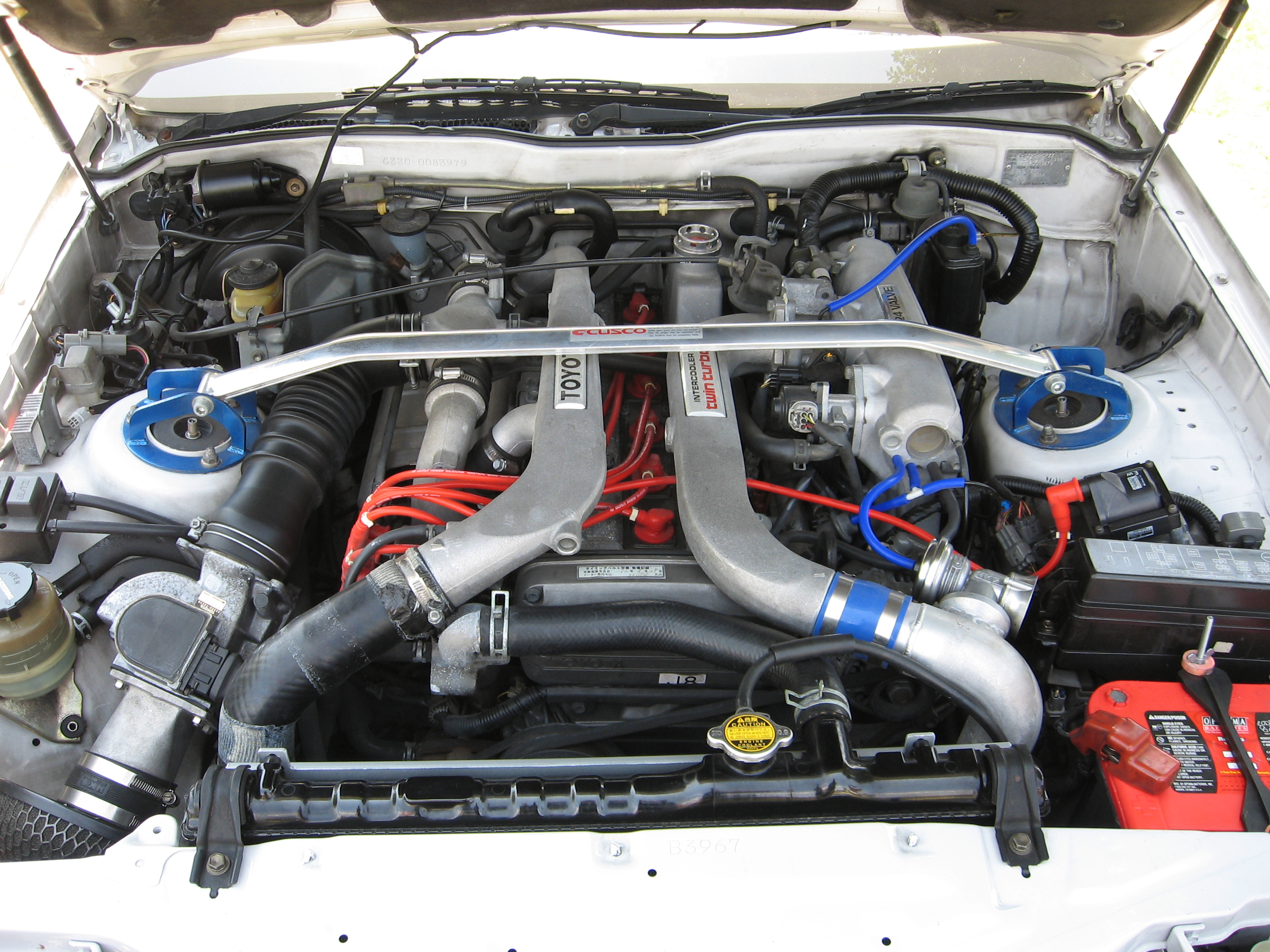
Toyota 1G-GTE

The 24-valve DOHC 1G-GTE added two CT-12 turbochargers, making it the first twin-turbocharged, twin cam engine of Japanese origin. There were three generations of this engine; both air-to-air and air-to-water intercoolers were used, pushing output from 185 to 210 PS (136 to 154 kW; 182 to 207 hp) at 6200 rpm and 234 to 275 N⋅m (173 to 203 lb⋅ft) at 3800 rpm using the air-to-air over the air-to-water. This was the most powerful engine of the G family. In May 1991 it was replaced with the 280 PS 1JZ-GTE on most Toyota cars.

Applications:

- 1986–1992 Supra MK3 (GA70; JDM only)
- 1986–1992 Mark II/Chaser/Cresta (GX71, GX81)
- 1986–1991 Soarer (GZ20)

=== 1G-GP/GPE ===
The 1G-GP and 1G-GPE was an LPG version of the 1G-GE engine. Output is 110 PS (81 kW; 108 hp) at 5600 rpm and torque is 15.5 kg⋅m (152 N⋅m; 112 lbf⋅ft) at 2400 rpm.

Applications:

- Toyota Crown Sedan (GS130, GS151)
- Toyota Crown Comfort/Sedan (GXS10)

=== 1G-GZE ===
The 1G-GZE was a supercharged version produced from 1986 until 1992. Output is 170 PS (125 kW; 168 hp) at 6,000 rpm and 226 N⋅m (167 lb⋅ft) at 3,600 rpm. Like the turbo, it was a 24-valve DOHC 6-cylinder engine but featured a distributorless ignition system (DIS). The 1G-GZE was mated only with automatic gearboxes. In August 1991 it was replaced with the 1JZ-GE on the Mark II/Chaser/Cresta, while serving on the Crown until 1992.

Applications:

- Toyota Crown GS120, GS121, GS131, GS130G (Station Wagon)
- 1988–1990 Toyota Mark II/Chaser/Cresta GX81

== See also ==
- List of Toyota engines
