= Toyota Mark II Blit =

Toyota Mark II Blit (X110)
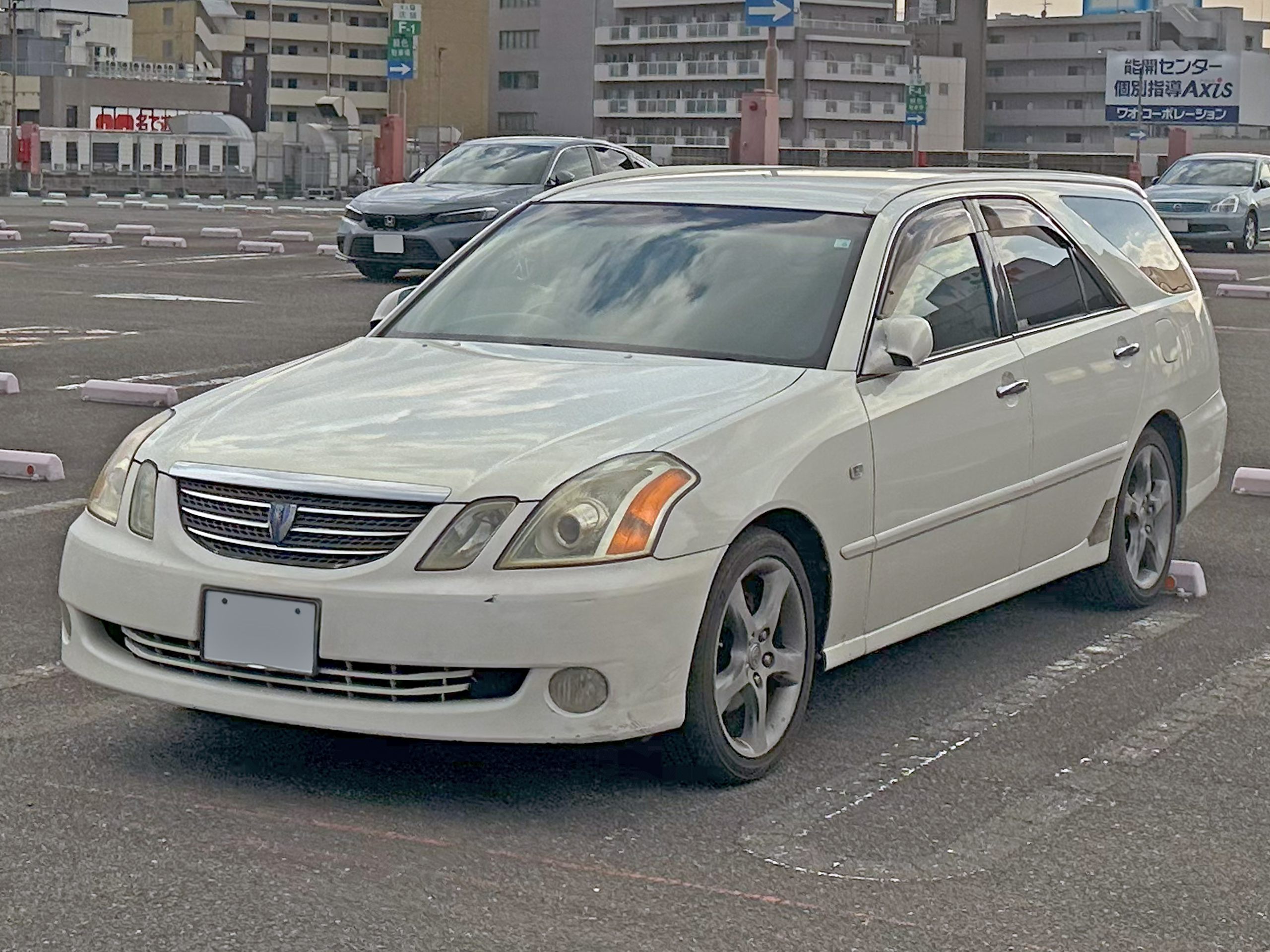
- 2002–2004 Toyota Mark II Blit 2.5iR-S (JZX110W)

Overview
- Manufacturer: Toyota
- Model code: X110
- Production: January 2002 – June 2007 (38,733 units)
- Assembly: Japan: Toyota City, Aichi (Motomachi plant)

Body and chassis
- Class: Mid-size car
- Body style: 5-door station wagon
- Layout: Front-engine, rear-wheel-drive; Front-engine, all-wheel-drive
- Related: Toyota Altezza/Lexus IS; Toyota Brevis; Toyota Crown (S170); Toyota Crown Majesta (S170); Toyota Progrès; Toyota Mark II (X110); Toyota Origin; Toyota Verossa

Powertrain
- Engine: Petrol: 2.0 L 1G-FE I6; 2.5 L 1JZ-FSE I6 D-4; 2.5 L 1JZ-GE I6; 2.5 L 1JZ-GTE I6-T
- Transmission: 5-speed automatic; 4-speed automatic

Dimensions
- Wheelbase: 2,780 mm (109.4 in)
- Length: 4,775 mm (188.0 in); 4,785 mm (188.4 in) (Fortuna)
- Width: 1,760 mm (69.3 in)
- Height: 1,450 mm (57.1 in) (Fortuna); 1,470 mm (57.9 in) (RWD); 1,485 mm (58.5 in) (AWD)
- Kerb weight: 1,470–1,620 kg (3,241–3,571 lb)

Chronology
- Predecessor: Toyota Mark II Qualis
- Successor: Toyota Mark X ZiO

The Toyota Mark II Blit (Japanese: トヨタ・マークIIブリット, Toyota Māku II Buritto) is a mid-size station wagon manufactured by the Japanese automaker Toyota. The wagon was introduced in January 2002, fifteen months after the Mark II (X110) sedan was released in October 2000. The Mark II Blit marked the return to the Mark II platform with rear-wheel drive layout with optional all-wheel drive, introduced as the replacement of the front-wheel drive Mark II Qualis, which was a rebadged XV20 series Camry Gracia wagon. The name "Blit" is taken from German word "blitz", meaning "lightning".

The Mark II Blit was exclusive to the Toyota Japanese dealership Toyopet Store (except in Tokyo and Osaka, where Tokyo Toyota and Osaka Toyota dealers also carried the Blit), allowing Toyopet to continue to offer a large, prestigious station wagon. Osaka Toyota became Osaka Toyopet in August 2006, aligning the sales network in this region with the rest of Japan.

The Mark II Blit uses inline six-cylinder engines with VVT-i technology, the same as its sedan counterpart. The engines used were the 2.0 L 1G-FE, 2.5 L direct injected 1JZ-FSE, 2.5 L 1JZ-GE, and 2.5 L single-turbocharged 1JZ-GTE. All of these engines were mated to a 4-speed automatic transmission, with the exception for the 1JZ-FSE engine, which was exclusively paired with a 5-speed automatic. A Torsen LSD was available as an optional extra on all models, except for the 2.0 L rear-wheel drive model.

The car was given a minor facelift in December 2004, including changes to the headlamps, grille and taillamps, which are replaced with LED units. The turbocharged 1JZ-GTE engine was discontinued in May 2006, as a result of Japan's emission standards in 2005.

The car remained in production until three years after the Mark X came out, which replaced all of Toyota's X-body sedans, the Verossa, which in turn is a successor to the Chaser and the Cresta, and the Mark II. Toyota discontinued Mark II Blit in June 2007, marking the end of the Mark II nameplate after 39 years. The wagon was succeeded by the front-wheel drive Mark X ZiO minivan in September 2007.

== Trim levels ==
The Mark II Blit was offered in several trim levels. It is identical to the Mark II sedan's trim levels, although the Mark II Blit was not offered in the Grande trim level:

Trim levels	2.5iR-V	2.5iR-S Four	2.5iR-S	2.0iR Four	2.0iR
Model code	JZX110W-AWPVZ	JZX115W-AWPSF	JZX110W-AWASH	GX115W-AWPSK	GX110W-AWPSK
Kerb weight	1,620 kg (3,571 lb)	1,610 kg (3,549 lb)	1,570–1,580 kg (3,461–3,483 lb)	1,550–1,560 kg (3,417–3,439 lb)	1,470–1,480 kg (3,241–3,263 lb)
Engine	1JZ-GTE	1JZ-GE	1JZ-FSE	1G-FE	
Transmission	4-speed A343E automatic	4-speed A340H automatic	5-speed A650E automatic	4-speed A340H automatic	4-speed A42DE automatic
Power output	280 PS (206 kW; 276 hp) at 6,200 rpm	196 PS (144 kW; 193 hp) at 6,000 rpm	200 PS (147 kW; 197 hp) at 6,000 rpm	160 PS (118 kW; 158 hp) at 6,200 rpm	
Torque output	377 N⋅m (278 lb⋅ft; 38 kg⋅m) at 2,400 rpm	255 N⋅m (188 lb⋅ft; 26 kg⋅m) at 4,000 rpm	250 N⋅m (184 lb⋅ft; 25 kg⋅m) at 3,800 rpm	200 N⋅m (148 lb⋅ft; 20 kg⋅m) at 4,400 rpm	

There was a J Edition sub-trim for pre-facelift model, which was essentially the lesser-equipped model of the 2.5iR-S, 2.0iR Four, and 2.0iR trims (lacking features such as the self-leveling rear suspension). In May 2003, a 35th Anniversary edition based on the 2.5iR-S, 20iR Four and 2.0iR trims was released; it came with special 11-spoke 17-inch alloy wheels and a navigation system. This limited-edition model was later rereleased simply as Limited series in April 2004 for the same trims, and again in the December 2004 facelift for the 2.0 L models only.

Other than the Toyopet Store dealer optional add-on body kits and interior accessories, there was also a separate optional package called Fortuna for the pre-facelift rear-wheel drive models, which was created by Modellista, a Toyota customization division. This package came with a standard aero front bumper, a new grille, 5-spoke 18-inch alloy wheels and a sport suspension that lowered the ride height by 15 mm (1 in). It could be further enhanced with an optional 14-spoke 18-inch alloy wheels and wing mirrors with integrated turn signals. For the 2.5iR-V trim, there was an additional Fortuna Yamaha Power package. This package featured a bigger turbocharger and a stainless steel muffler, which increased the power output to 300 PS (221 kW; 296 hp) and 389 N⋅m (287 lb⋅ft; 40 kg⋅m) of torque. It could be optionally enhanced with a strut brace and performance brake pads.

== Gallery ==
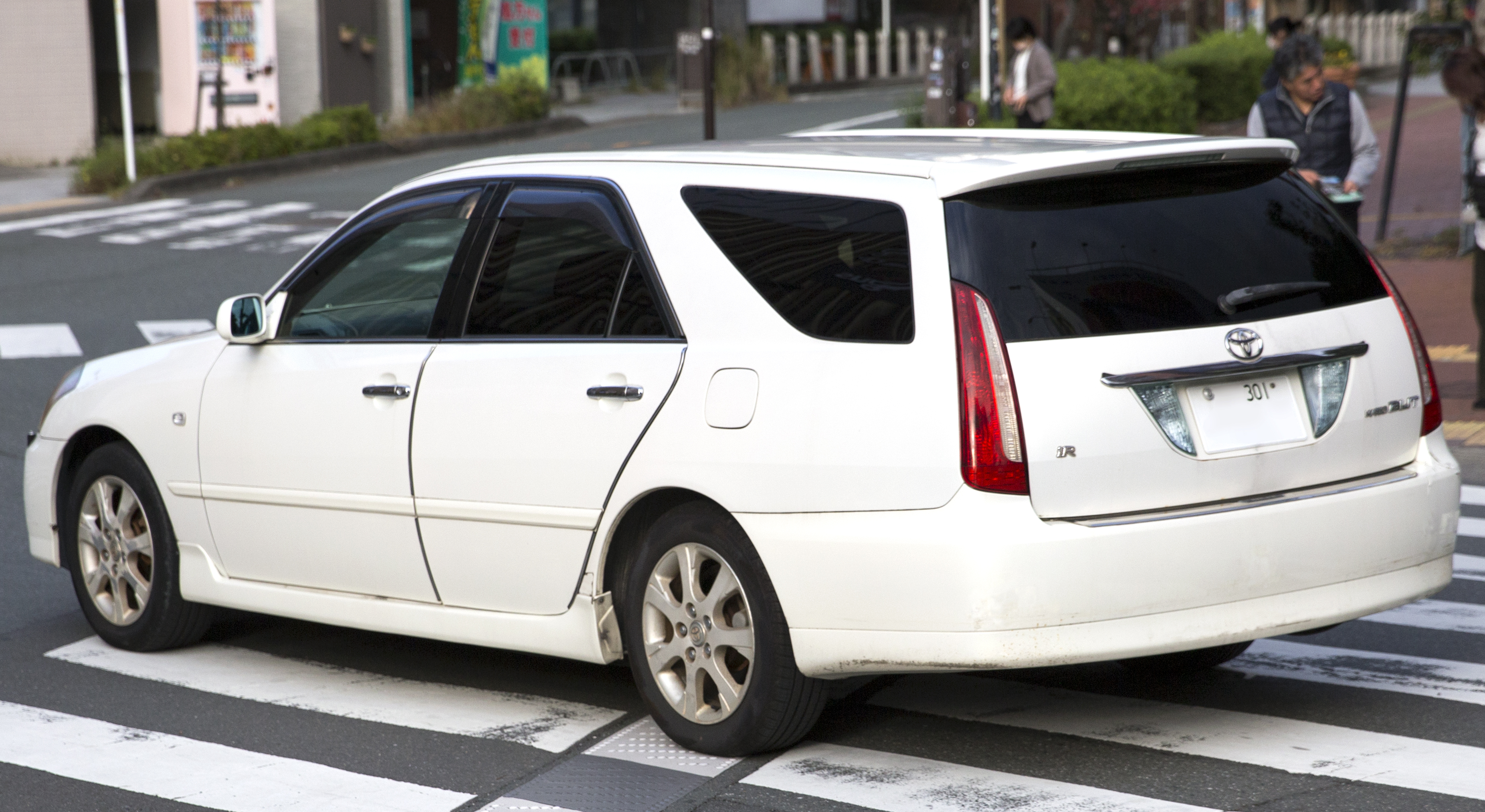
2002–2004 Toyota Mark II Blit 2.0iR (GX110W)

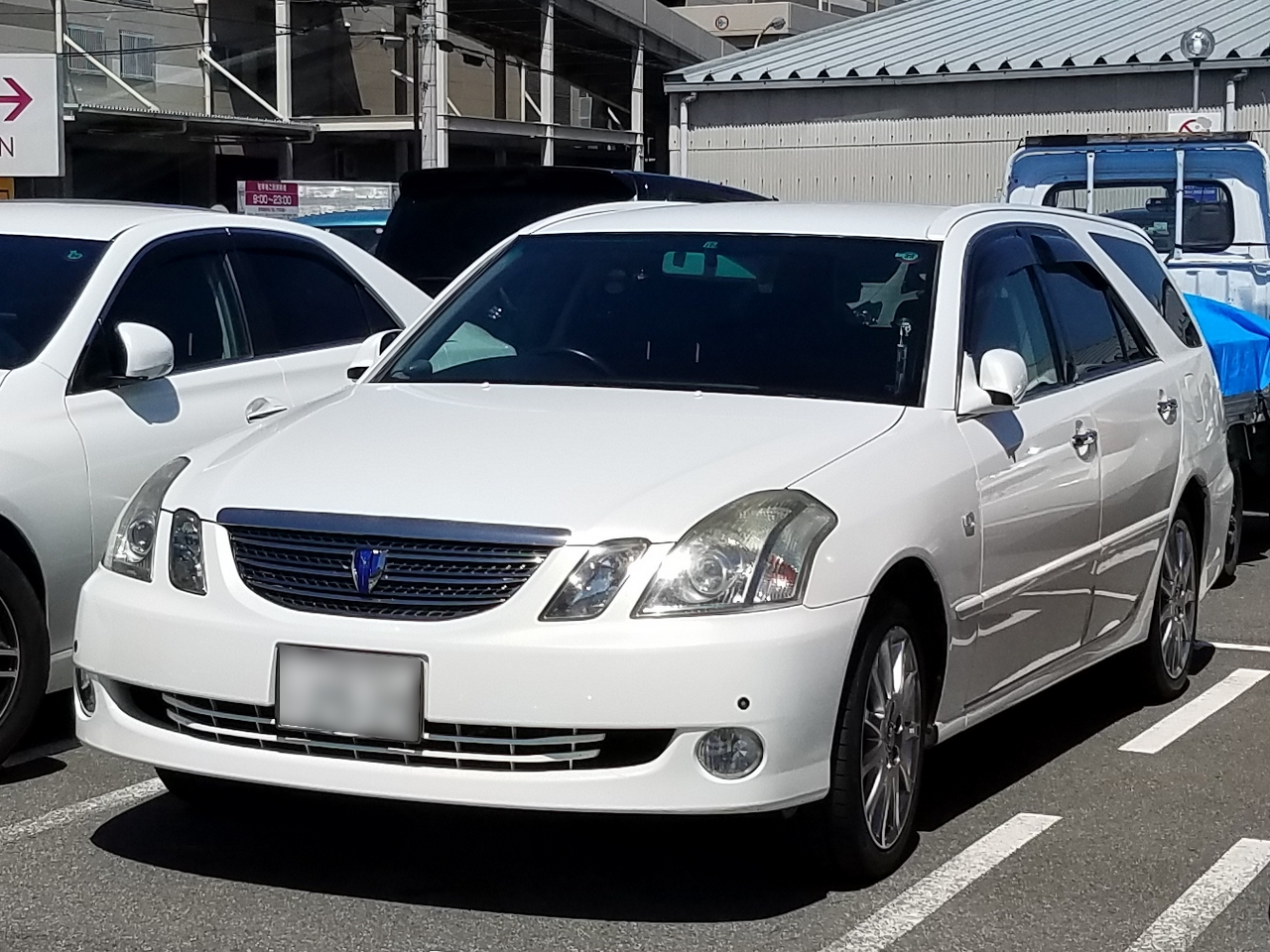
2005–2007 Toyota Mark II Blit 2.0iR (GX110W)

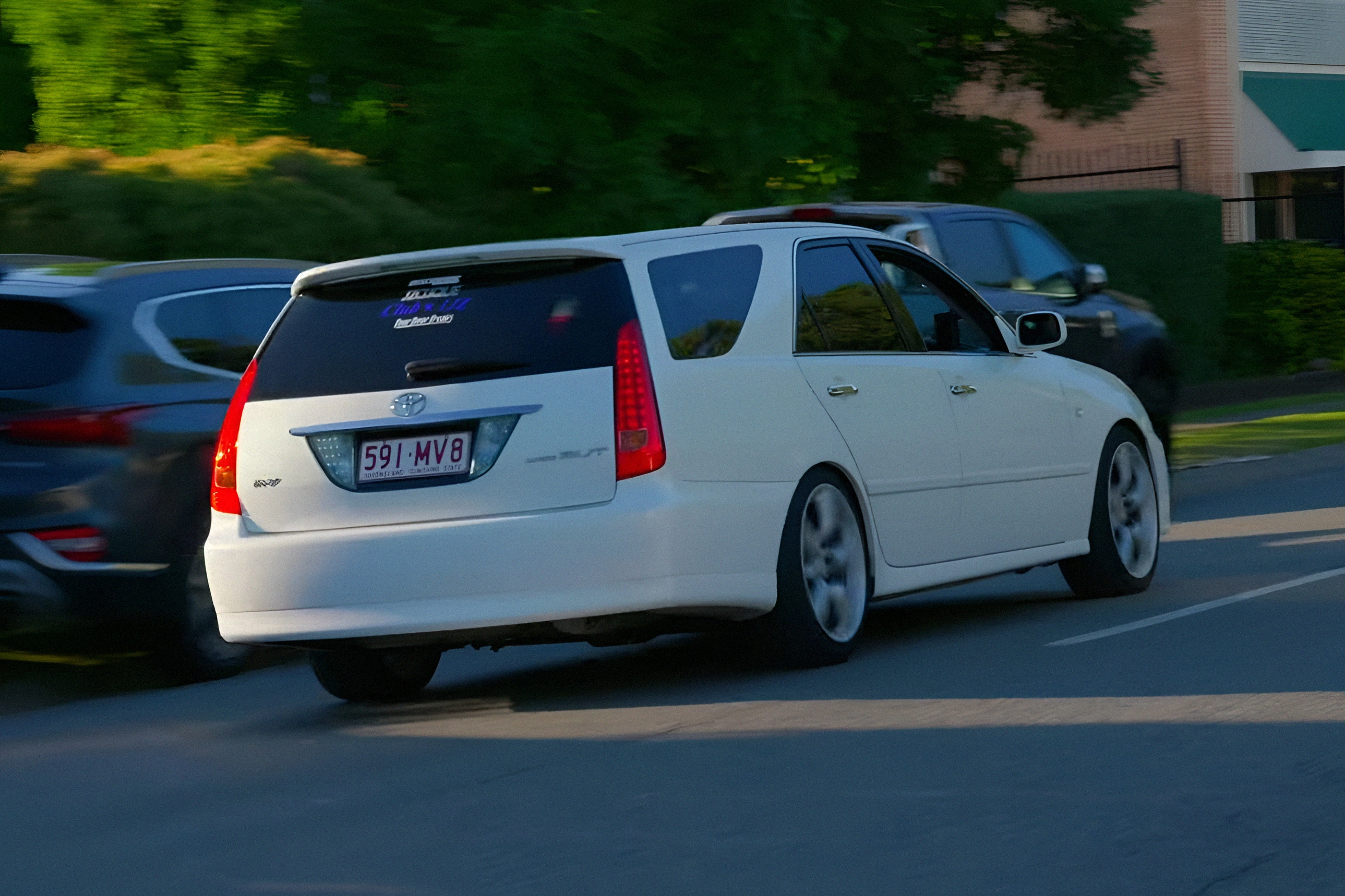
2005–2007 Toyota Mark II Blit 2.5iR-V (JZX110W)

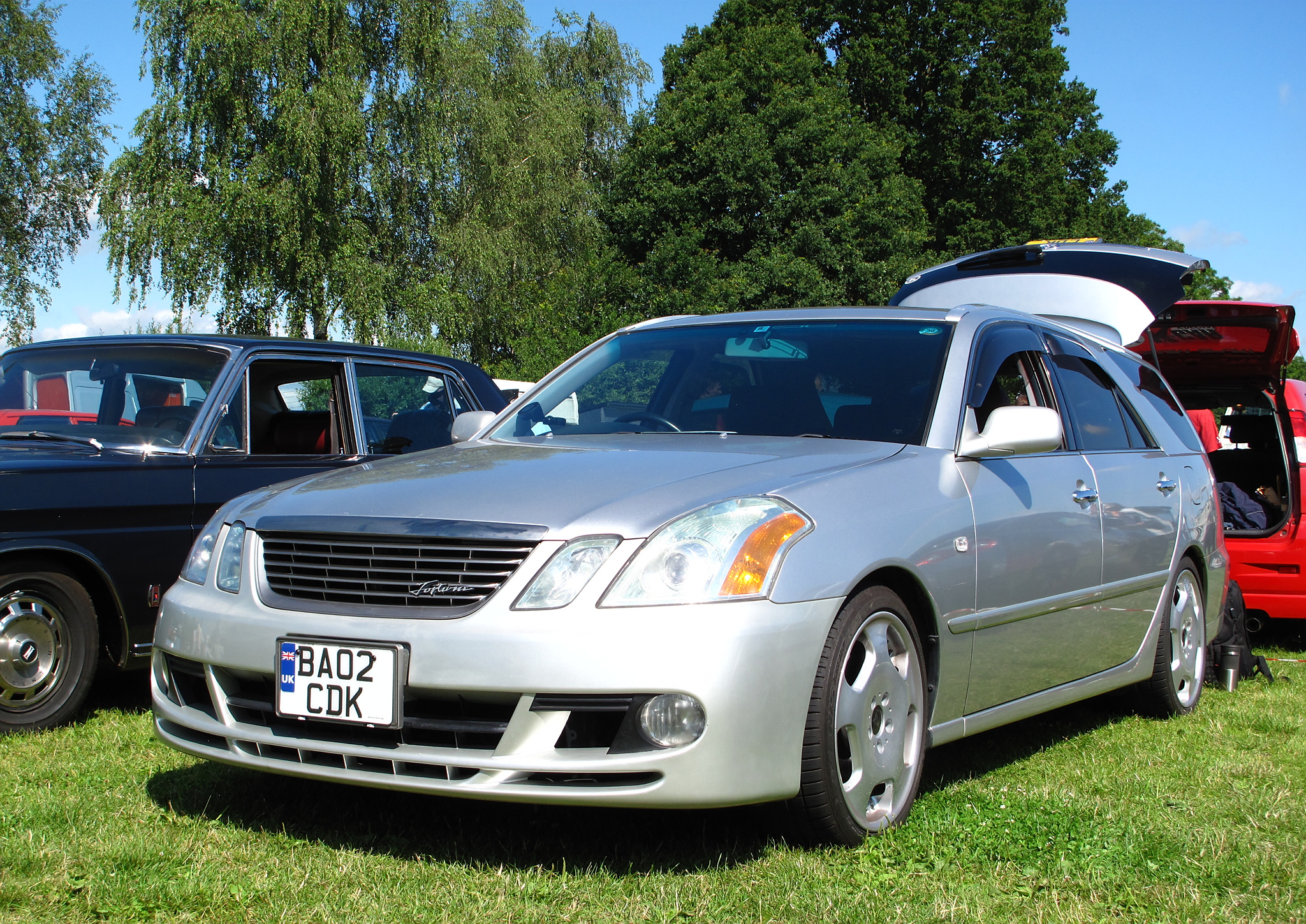
Toyota Mark II Blit with Fortuna package

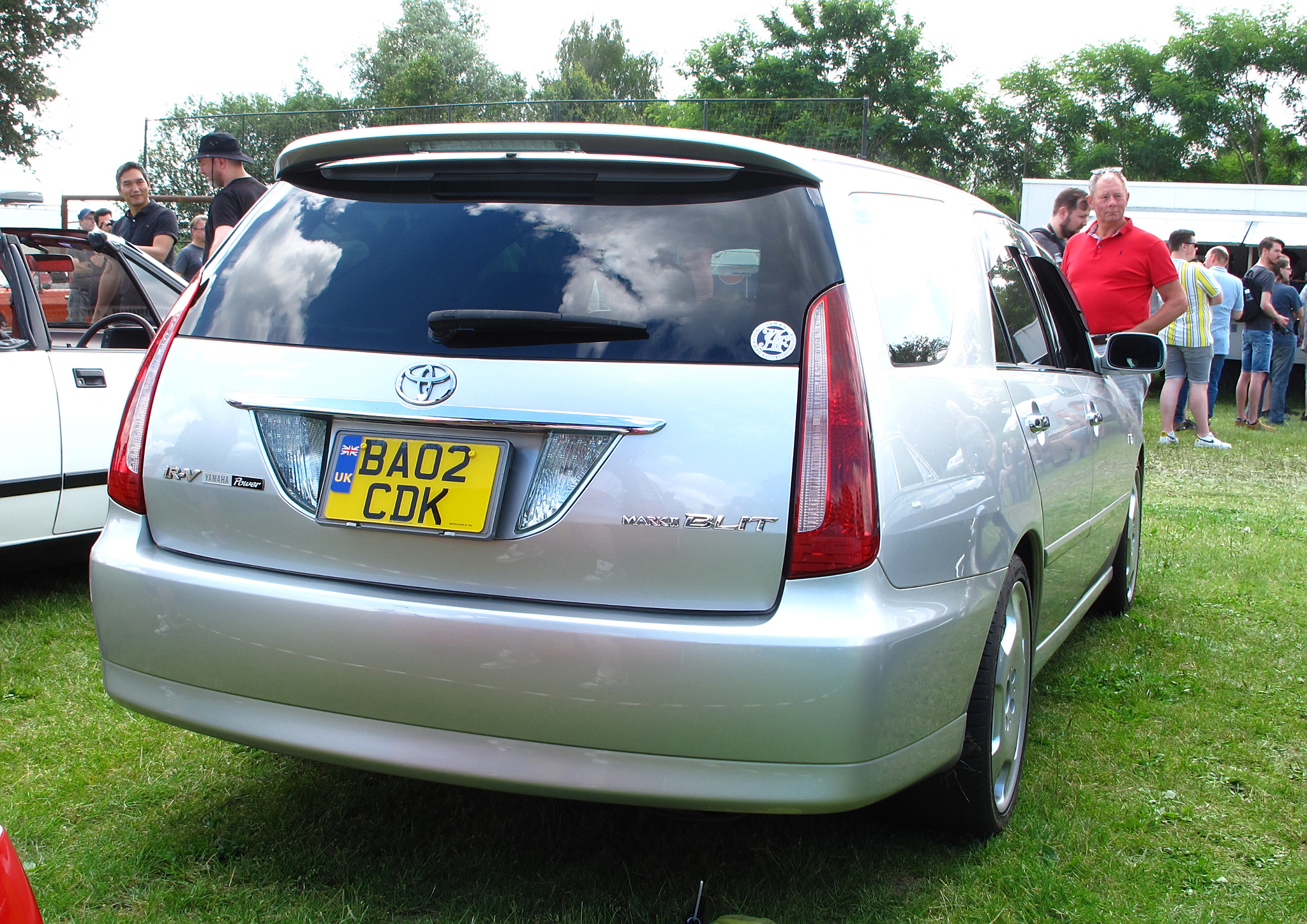
Toyota Mark II Blit 2.5iR-V Fortuna Yamaha Power

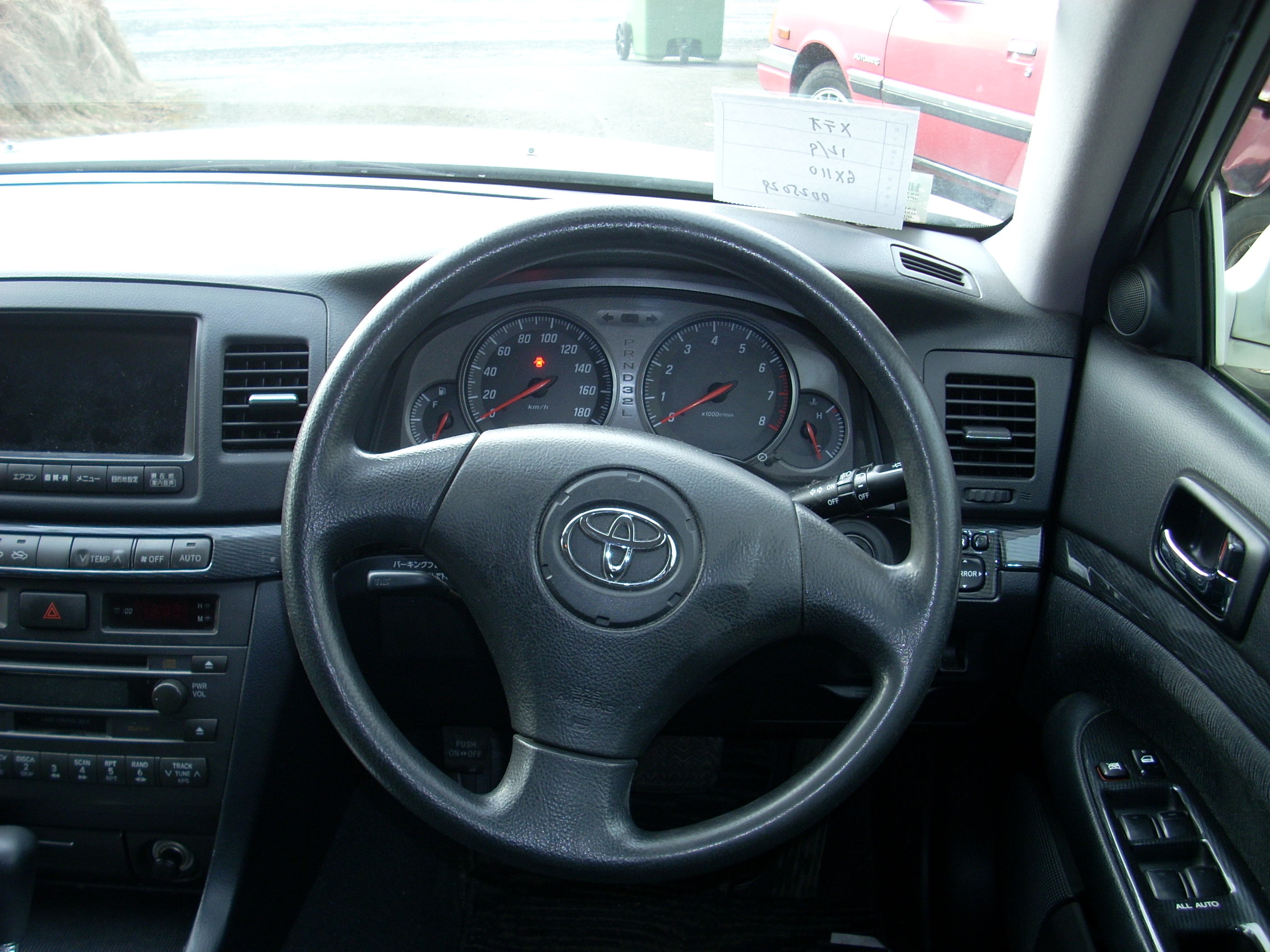
Interior
