= Toyota Mark X ZiO =

Toyota Mark X ZiO (AA10)
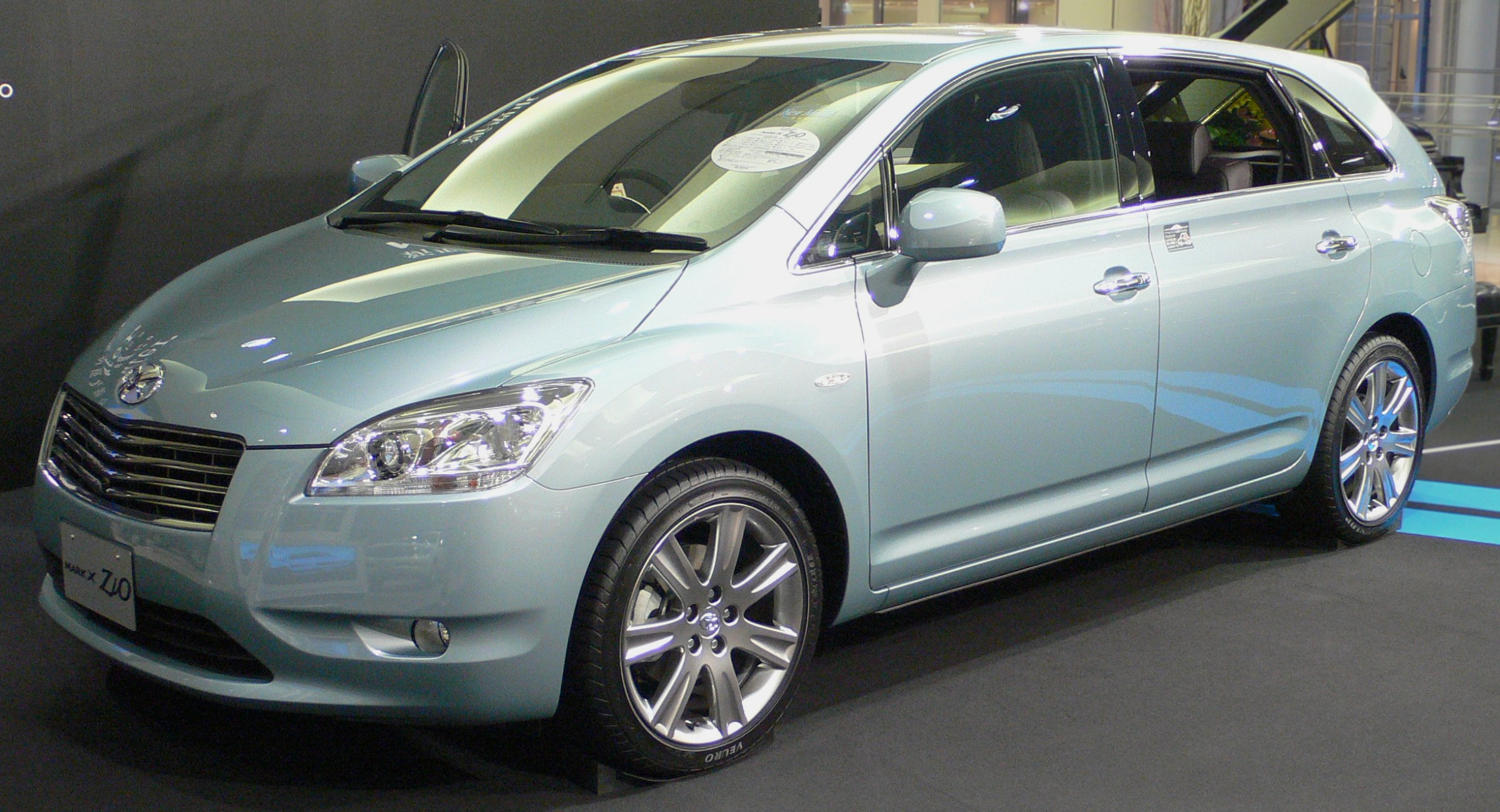
- Pre-facelift model

Overview
- Manufacturer: Toyota
- Production: September 2007 – December 2013
- Assembly: Japan: Ōbu, Aichi (Nagakusa plant)

Body and chassis
- Class: Mid-size MPV
- Body style: 5-door wagon
- Layout: Front-engine, front-wheel-drive; Front-engine, four-wheel-drive (2.4 L only)
- Platform: Toyota New MC platform
- Related: Toyota RAV4 (XA30); Toyota Auris/Blade (E150)

Powertrain
- Engine: Gasoline: 2.4 L 2AZ-FE I4 (ANA10/15); 3.5 L 2GR-FE V6 (GGA10)
- Power output: 120 kW (161 hp; 163 PS) (2AZ-FE); 206 kW (276 hp; 280 PS) (2GR-FE)
- Transmission: 6-speed U660E automatic (3.5 L); K112 CVT (2.4 L)

Dimensions
- Wheelbase: 2,780 mm (109.4 in)
- Length: 4,715 mm (185.6 in)
- Width: 1,785 mm (70.3 in)
- Height: 1,550 mm (61.0 in)
- Curb weight: 1,570–1,660 kg (3,461–3,660 lb)

Chronology
- Predecessor: Toyota Mark II Blit

The Toyota Mark X ZiO (Japanese: トヨタ・マークXジオ, Hepburn: Toyota Māku X Jio) is a mid-size MPV manufactured by Toyota from 2007 to 2013. Replacing the Mark II Blit station wagon, it was sold exclusively in Japan and was exclusive to Toyopet Store dealerships, sold alongside the Mark X sedan from September 2007.

Despite sharing the nameplate, the front-wheel-drive Mark X ZiO (with optional four-wheel drive) shares few features with the rear-wheel-drive Mark X sedan. The ZiO chassis is derived from the New MC platform which is the basis of the E150 series Auris/Blade, XA30 series RAV4, T270 series Avensis and the XW30 series Prius. The front suspension is MacPherson strut, with double wishbone in the rear.

The name "ZiO" (pronounced "geo") is an acronym to suggest its spaciousness and cargo capacity, meaning "Zones in One".

== Design ==
The Mark X ZiO was based on the FSC concept car shown at the 2005 Tokyo Motor Show, and was released on September 26, 2007. It is the successor to the Mark II Blit.

Marketed under "4+Free" concept, its interior has four independent seats plus "free space" in the rear. The ZiO's "three mode" cabin can accommodate from four to seven passengers. The six-seat models have two rows of independent seats and a console box with arm rest. In "personal sedan mode," a tonneau board is used to create a sedan-like vehicle. "Active wagon mode" creates a large cargo space in the rear by stowing the tonneau board and covers. The "friendly minivan mode" includes a third row of seating that can be dropped down to create cargo space. It is similar in concept to but does not share a platform with the Venza.

It was the first Toyota model that used MOST Bus technology, and offered the following equipment options: Pre-crash Safety System using millimetre-wave radar, a Smart Key System (SKS) eliminating the traditional ignition key, Radar Cruise Control, Intelligent AFS (Adaptive Front-lighting System), Intelligent Parking Assist, HDD navigation system, and wide-view front monitor with a 190-degree field of view.

In its first year of production, it won the Good Design Award given by the Japan Industrial Design Promotion Organization.

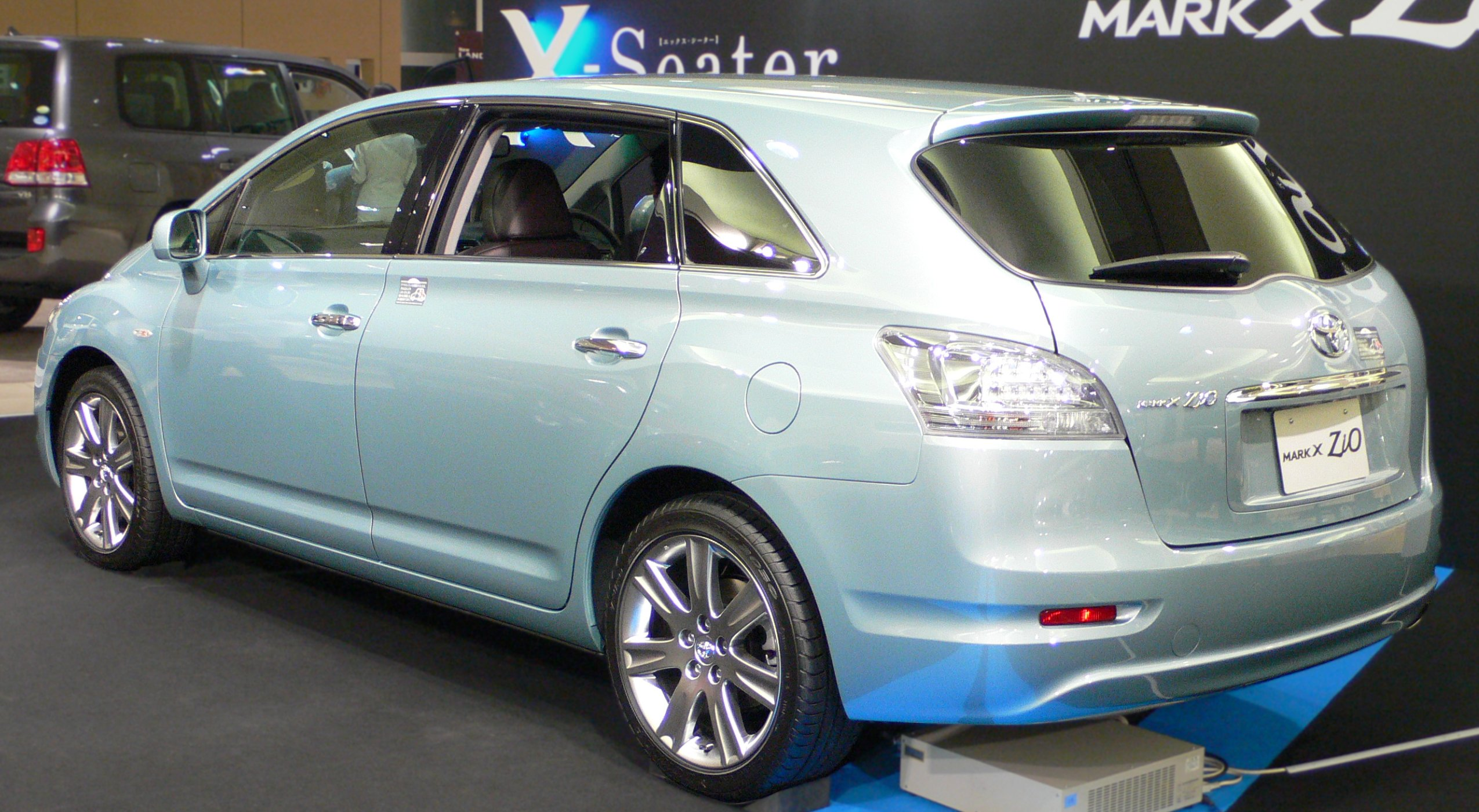
Rear view

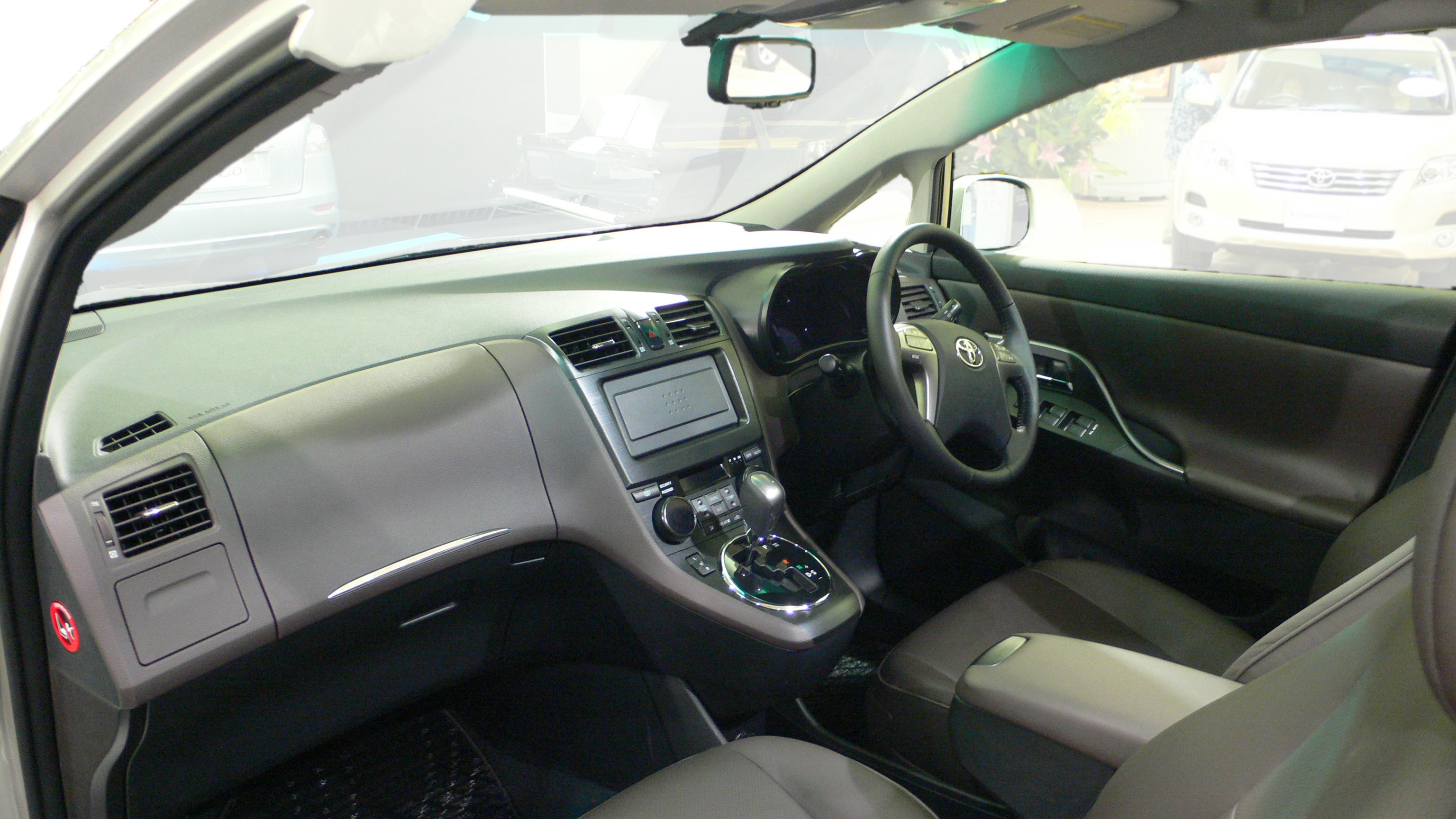
Interior

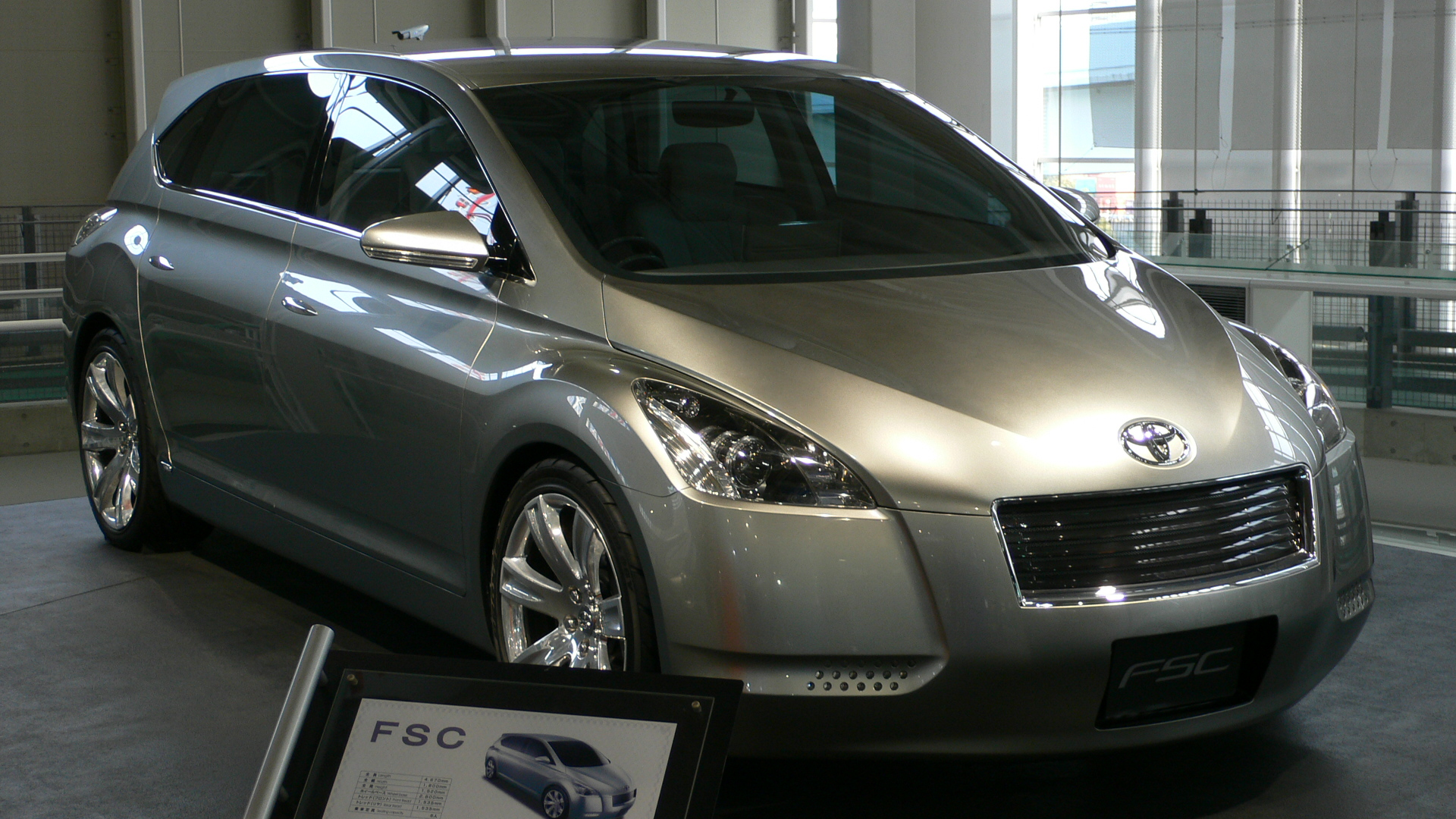
2005 FSC concept car

=== Facelift ===
The facelifted Mark X ZiO was released on 14 February 2011. This minor change includes changes to the design of the front grille and aluminum wheels, as well as the adoption of a decorative plated rear molding, giving the standard style.

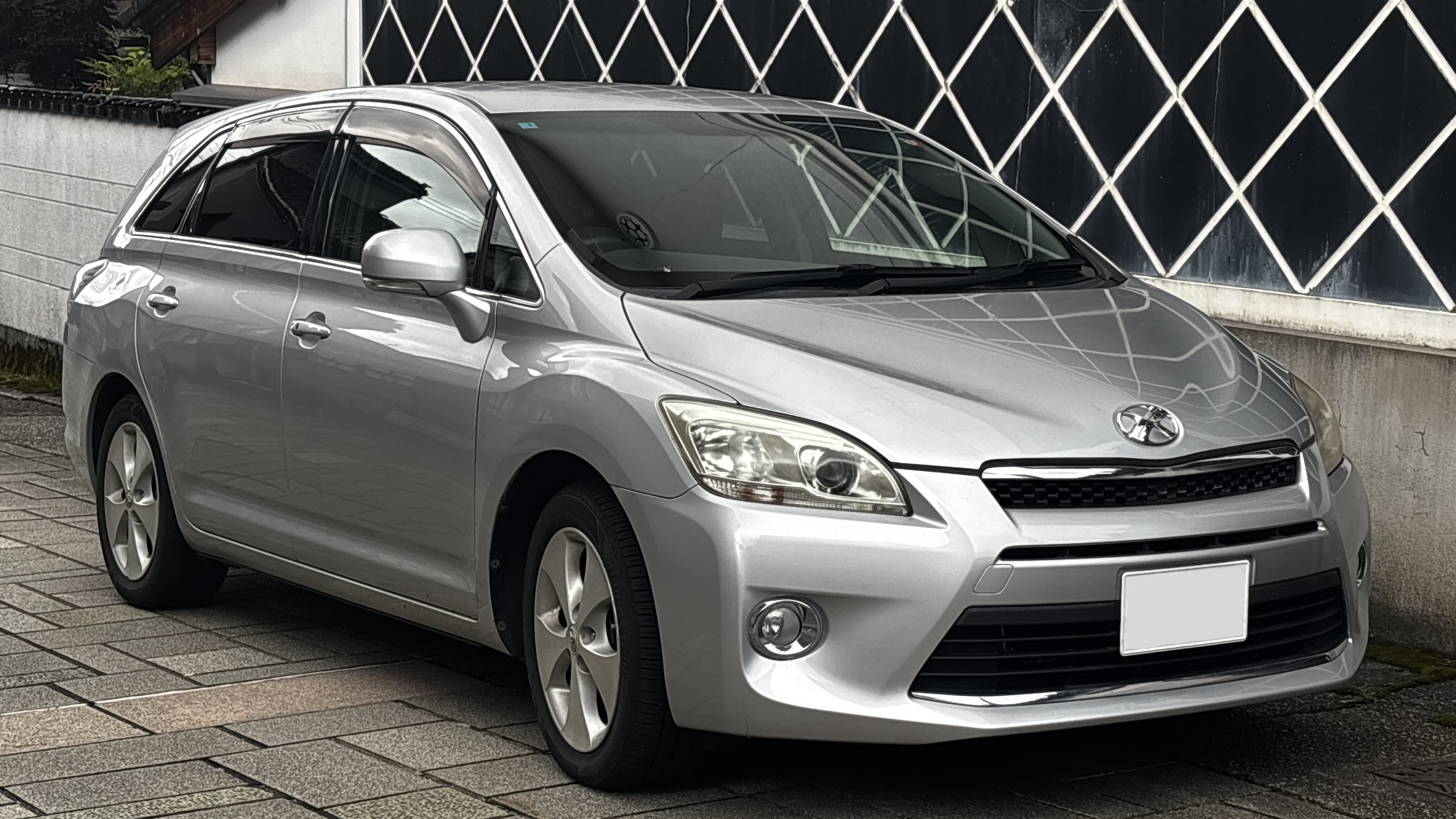
240 "Five Style" (front view)

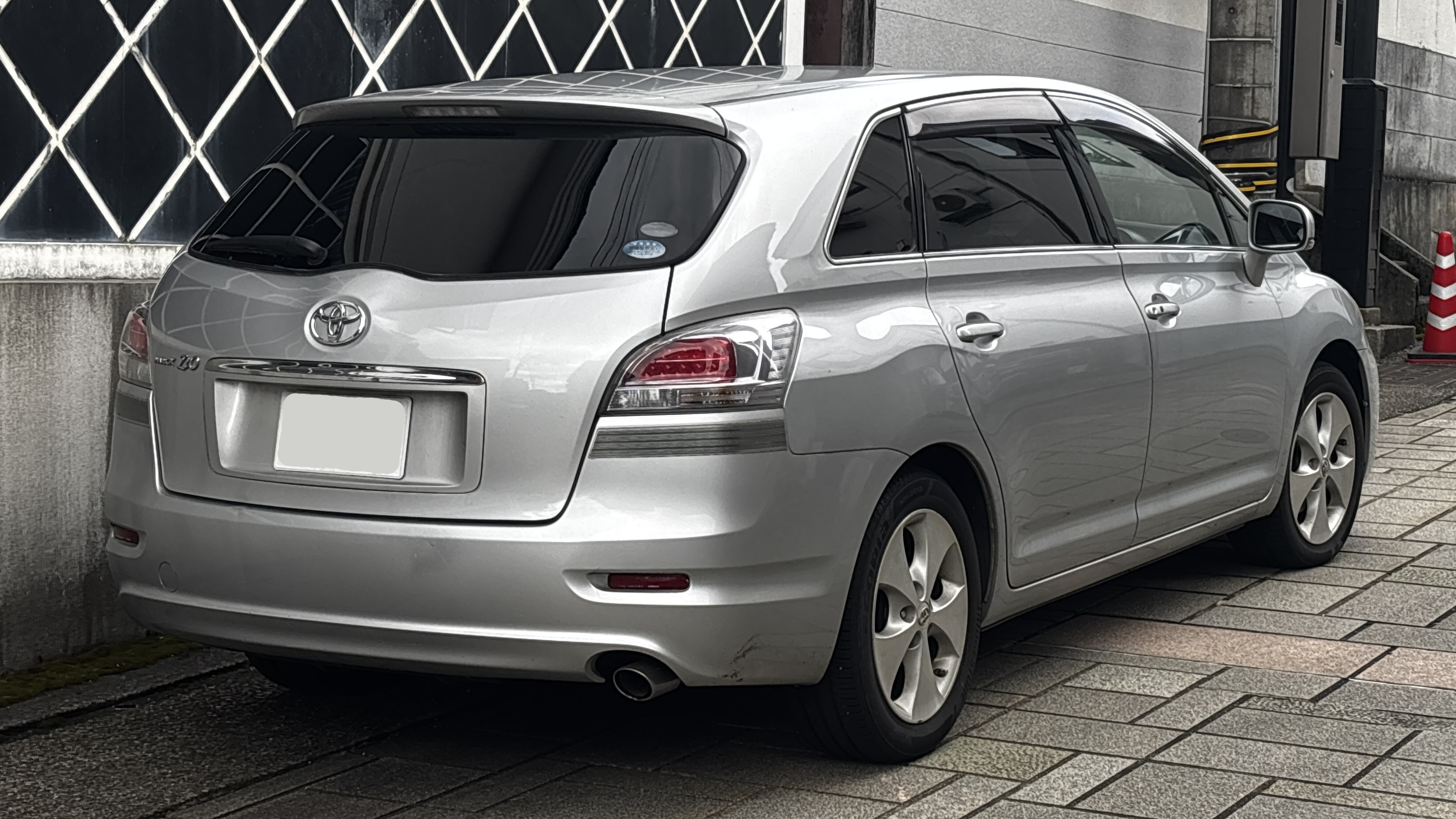
240 "Five Style" (rear view)

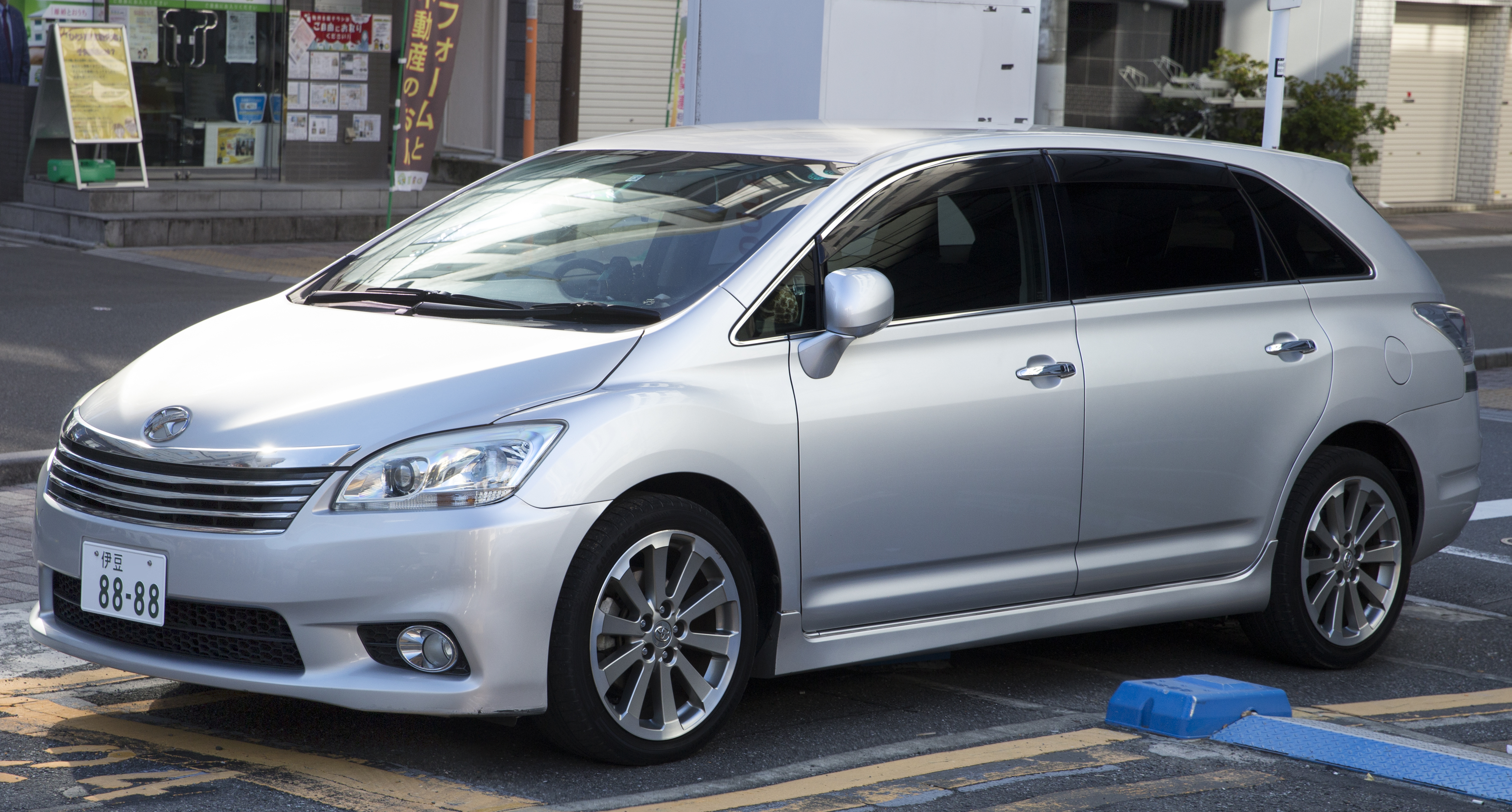
Aerial (front view)

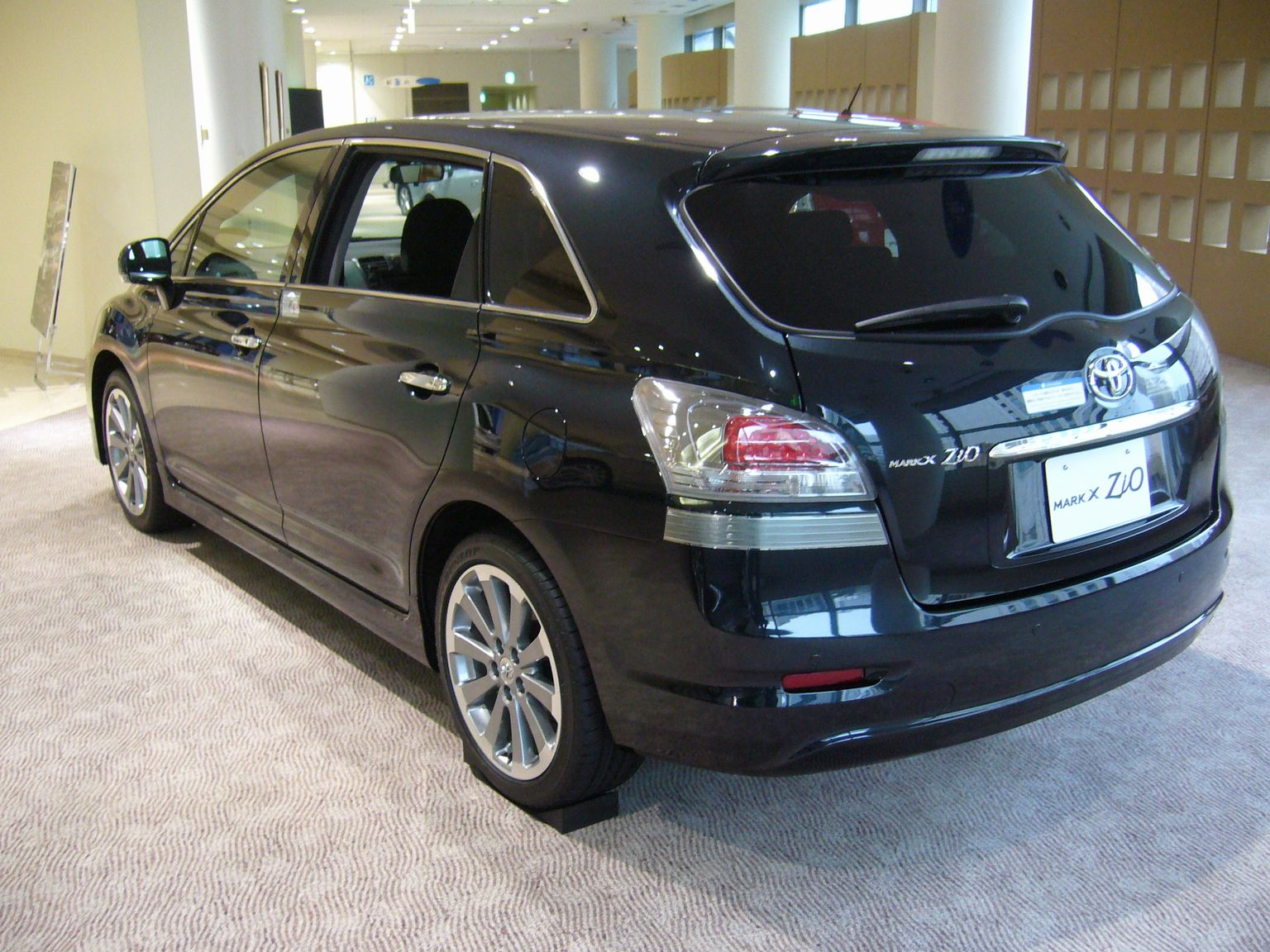
Aerial (rear view)

== Powertrains ==
The Mark X ZiO had two powertrain options: a 120 kW (161 hp; 163 PS) 2.4-liter 2AZ-FE four-cylinder engine mated to a K112 continuously variable transmission (CVT), and a 206 kW (276 hp; 280 PS) 3.5-liter 2GR-FE V6 engine mated to a 6-speed U660E automatic transmission. The four-wheel drive option was only available for the 2.4 L model.

== Sales ==
Its production up to 2012 was 51,000 units and ended in November 2013.
