= Toyota Verossa =

Mid-size sedan

Toyota Verossa (X110)
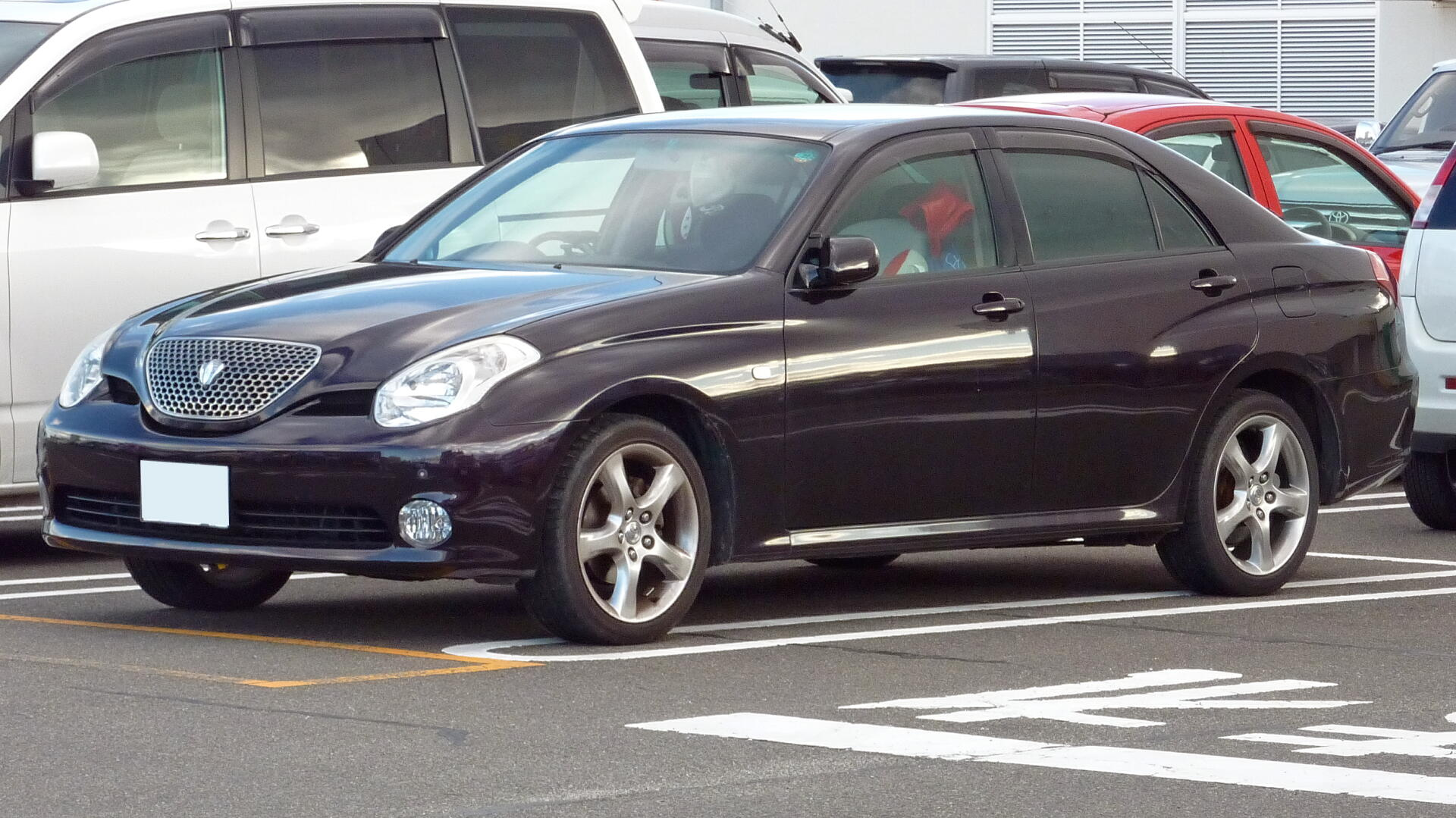

Overview
- Manufacturer: Toyota
- Production: June 2001 – April 2004 (26,054 units)
- Assembly: Japan: Kanegasaki, Iwate (Kanto Auto Works)

Body and chassis
- Class: Mid-size car
- Body style: 4-door sedan
- Layout: Front-engine, rear-wheel-drive; Front-engine, four-wheel-drive (GX115)
- Related: Toyota Mark II (X110); Toyota Mark II Blit

Powertrain
- Engine: Petrol: 2.0 L 1G-FE I6 (GX110/115); 2.5 L 1JZ-FSE direct-injected I6 (JZX110); 2.5 L 1JZ-GTE I6-T (JZX110)
- Power output: 119 kW (160 hp; 162 PS) (1G-FE); 147 kW (197 hp; 200 PS) (1JZ-FSE); 206 kW (276 hp; 280 PS) (1JZ-GTE)
- Transmission: 5-speed manual (1JZ-GTE); 4-speed automatic (1G-FE/1JZ-GTE); 5-speed automatic (1JZ-FSE)

Dimensions
- Wheelbase: 2,780 mm (109.4 in)
- Length: 4,705 mm (185.2 in)
- Width: 1,760 mm (69.3 in)
- Height: 1,450 mm (57.1 in)
- Kerb weight: 1,380–1,530 kg (3,042–3,373 lb)

Chronology
- Predecessor: Toyota Chaser; Toyota Cresta
- Successor: Toyota Mark X

The Toyota Verossa (Japanese: トヨタ・ヴェロッサ, Toyota Verossa) is a mid-size sedan produced by Toyota for the Japanese market, and was exclusive new to the Netz Store locations as the smaller companion sedan to the Aristo. The Verossa exceeded Japanese government dimension regulations concerning external dimensions and engine displacement, offering buyers a sedan that continued to offer a rear-wheel drive platform, opposite the 2001–2006 Camry with very similar dimensions and front-wheel drive platform. The advantage the Verossa offered over the Camry was the ability to offer four-wheel drive, which the Camry could not do. The Verossa, introduced in June 2001, was launched with the Toyopet Store alternative called the Progrès and the Toyota Store Brevis.

Toyota replaced the aging Mark II stablemates, the Chaser and Cresta which ended production together in 2000 with the Verossa, combining the sporting aspects of the Chaser with the luxury characteristics of the Cresta, in a vehicle that is smaller than the Crown. The Verossa was a larger version of the Altezza that debuted in 1998 and became a sales success, offering high performance and luxury with a six-cylinder engine and rear-wheel drive. The Verossa shared its "X"-chassis model code with its predecessors and also featured the rear-wheel drive layout. The Verossa's production ceased in April 2004 due to poor sales.

The "Verossa" name is coined from Italian words "vero", meaning "truth" and "rosso", meaning "red".

== Trim levels ==
The Verossa was sold in six trim levels featuring three six-cylinder engines and transmission types. Four-wheel drive was offered on some trim levels, but only available with an automatic transmission. Standard equipment and options throughout the Verossa's range included a front stabilizer bar, navigation, power seats and fully automatic air conditioning. The different engine sizes were offered to allow Japanese buyers to choose which annual road tax they were willing to pay; the larger engines did offer higher levels of standard equipment and luxury features.

=== 20, 20Four and 20Four G Package ===
The entry-level Verossa came equipped with Toyota's 1G-FE engine producing 119 kW (160 hp; 162 PS) at 6,200 rpm and 200 N⋅m (148 lbf⋅ft) of torque at 4,400 rpm. The 20 was only available with an electronically controlled 4-speed automatic transmission. The 20Four and 20Four G package offered All-Trac full-time four-wheel drive. The G Package included aesthetic accouterments like alloy wheels and leather seats.

=== 25 and V25 ===
These models featured Toyota's 1JZ-FSE engine with direct injection rated at 147 kW (197 hp; 200 PS) at 6,000 rpm and 250 N⋅m (184 lbf⋅ft) of torque at 3,800 rpm. Both came with a 5-speed electronically controlled automatic transmission, differentiating them from the 2.0 L variants. The more upmarket V25 featured a rear stabilizer bar in addition to the front stabilizer bar found in the 2.0 L variants, along with larger 17-inch wheels and leather seating option.

=== VR25 ===
A throwback to the Tourer V variant of its predecessors, the VR25 featured the 1JZ-GTE engine equipped with single CT15B turbocharger rated at 206 kW (276 hp; 280 PS) at 6,200 rpm and 377 N⋅m (278 lbf⋅ft) of torque at 2,400 rpm, and was mated to either a 5-speed manual or the same 4-speed automatic as found in the 2.0 L variants with a standard limited-slip differential. As per the V25, the VR25 came with front and rear strut-tower bars and 17-inch wheels; leather was an option as were front and rear spoilers.

== Gallery ==
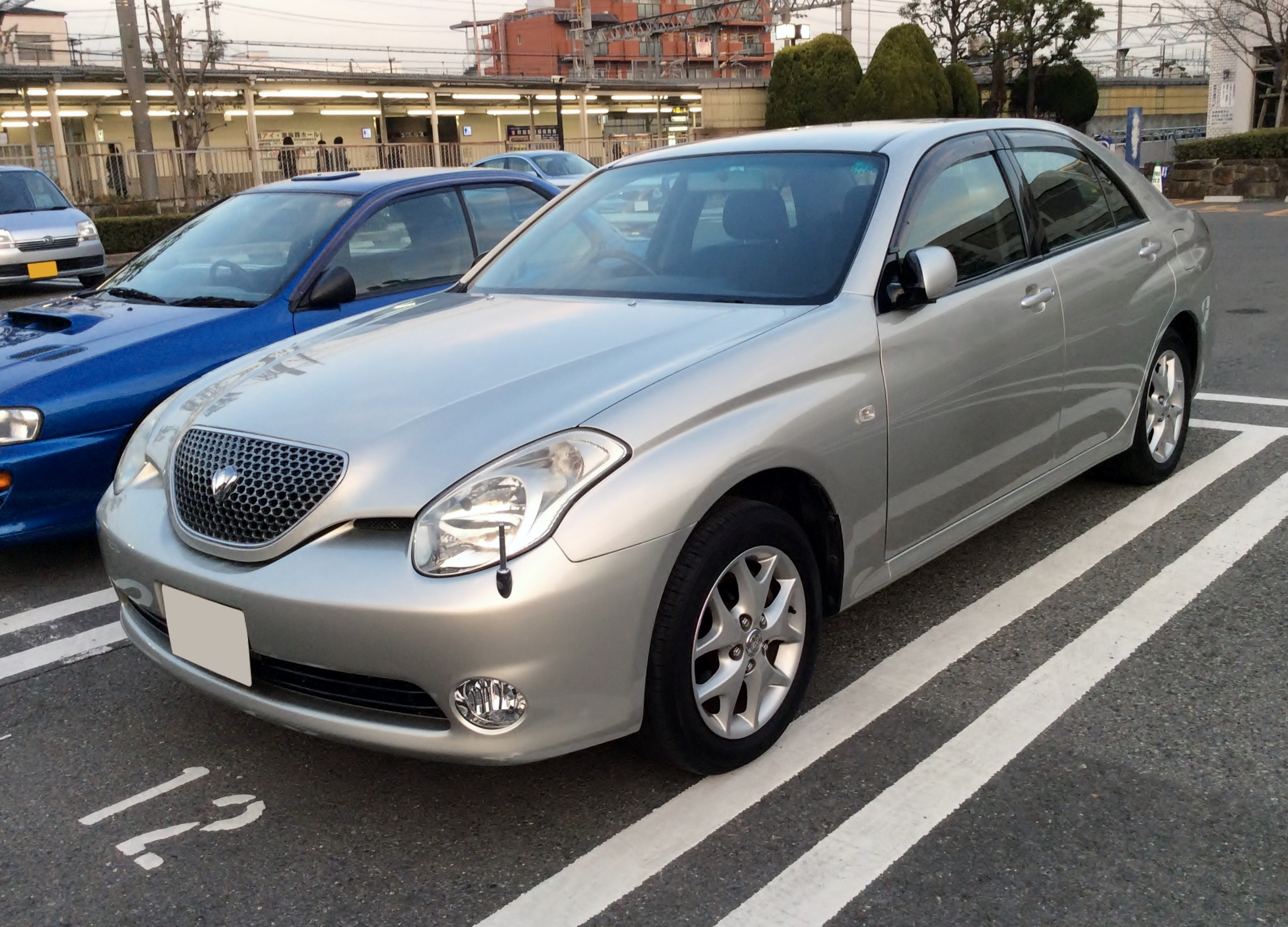
Toyota Verossa 25 (JZX110, Japan)

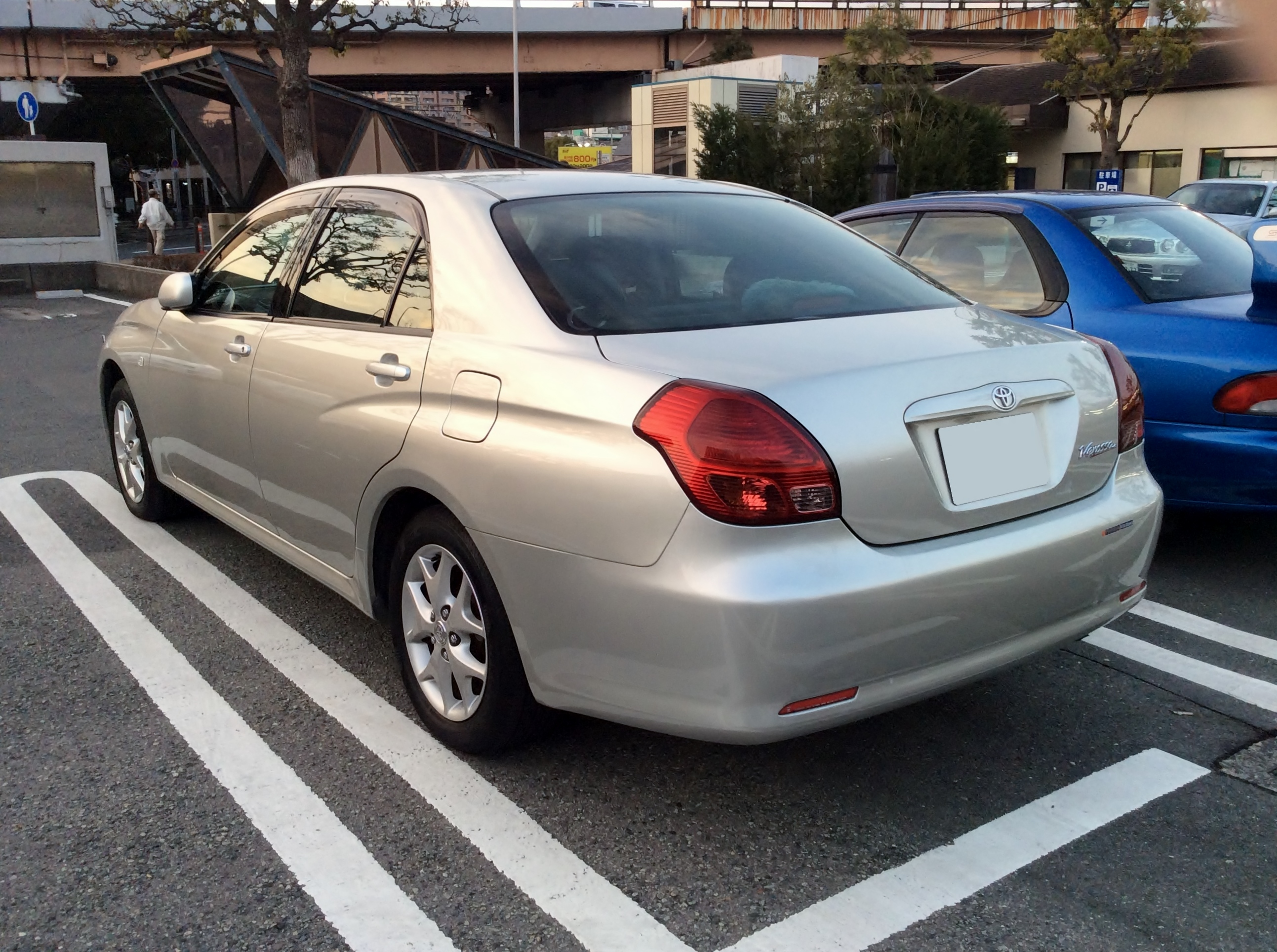
Toyota Verossa 25 (JZX110, Japan)
