= Toyota FX-1 =

Concept car

The FX-1 is a concept car by Toyota. It was first shown at the 1983 Tokyo Motor Show and also shown at the Geneva Motor Show in March 1984. It was a showcase for new technologies in driver controls, engine, suspension, materials and aerodynamics.

== Driver controls ==
Colour CRTs were used in the dash to display speed, rpm, fuel, temperature, etc.

== Engine and driveline ==
It used an enhanced prototype form of the 1G-GEU engine called the LASREα-X, a 1,988 cc EFI twin cam 24-valve inline six engine equipped with dual turbo-chargers and intercooler, computer-controlled valve timing, variable displacement and induction. At low speeds, the variable displacement system shut down half the engine to conserve fuel. The system never went into production but a simplified version later appeared as the 1G-GTE, slightly modified for production and without the variable cam timing and variable displacement. In search of reducing maintenance, the FX-1's engine also featured computer-controlled distributorless ignition.

Transmission was via a four-speed automatic ECT (Electronically Controlled Transmission) with overdrive.

== Suspension ==
It used a pneumatic suspension combined with TEMS electronic damping control. The pneumatic suspension automatically raised and lowered the front and rear of the car separately for maximum stability. TEMS was also used on the Supra and the Soarer (2 stage) and on the highest spec Crown (3 stage).

== Materials ==
Many exotic materials were used, including Fibre Reinforced Metal (body panels) and Shape Memory Effect Alloy (body panels) and Ceramics (brake rotors).

== Aerodynamics ==
The body had a very low drag coefficient of Cd=0.25.

Stability could be increased via aerodynamics by individually lowering the front and rear suspension according to road speed. At high speed the front was lowered two steps and the rear was lowered one step.
