= Toyota JZ engine =

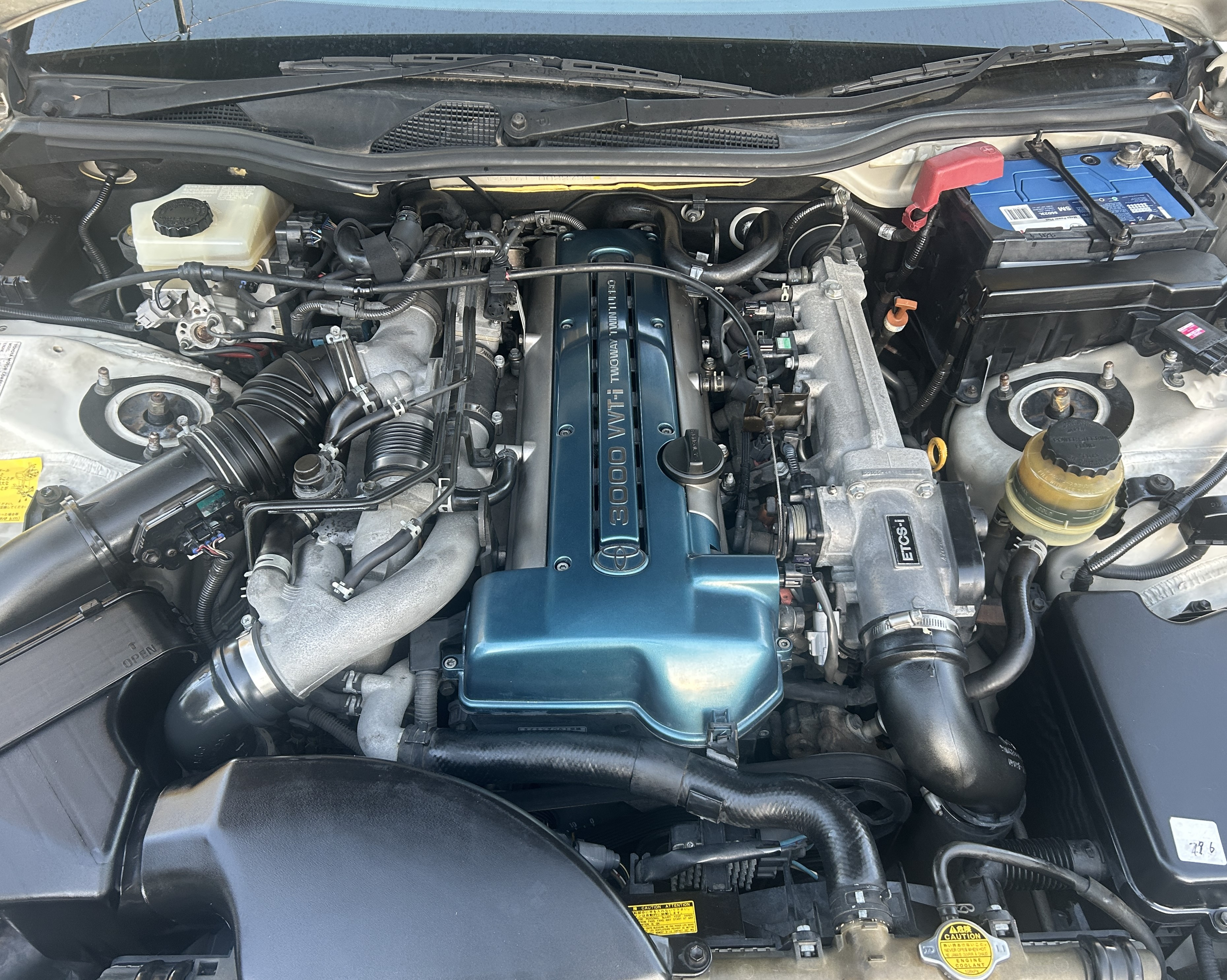
- 2JZ-GTE engine in a Toyota Aristo

Overview
- Manufacturer: Toyota
- Production: 1990–2007

Layout
- Configuration: Straight-6
- Cylinder block material: Cast iron
- Cylinder head material: Aluminium

Combustion
- Cooling system: Water-cooled

Chronology
- Predecessor: Toyota M engine

The Toyota JZ engine family is a series of inline-6 automobile engines produced by Toyota. As a replacement for the M-series inline-6 engines, the JZ engines were 24-valve DOHC engines in 2.5- and 3.0-litre versions.

== 1JZ ==
The 2,492 cc (2.5 L; 152.1 cu in) 1JZ version was produced from 1990 to 2007 (last sold in the Mark II Blit Wagon and Crown Athlete). Cylinder bore and stroke is 86 mm × 71.5 mm (3.39 in × 2.81 in). It is a 24-valve DOHC engine with two belt-driven camshafts and a dual-stage intake manifold.

=== 1JZ-GE ===
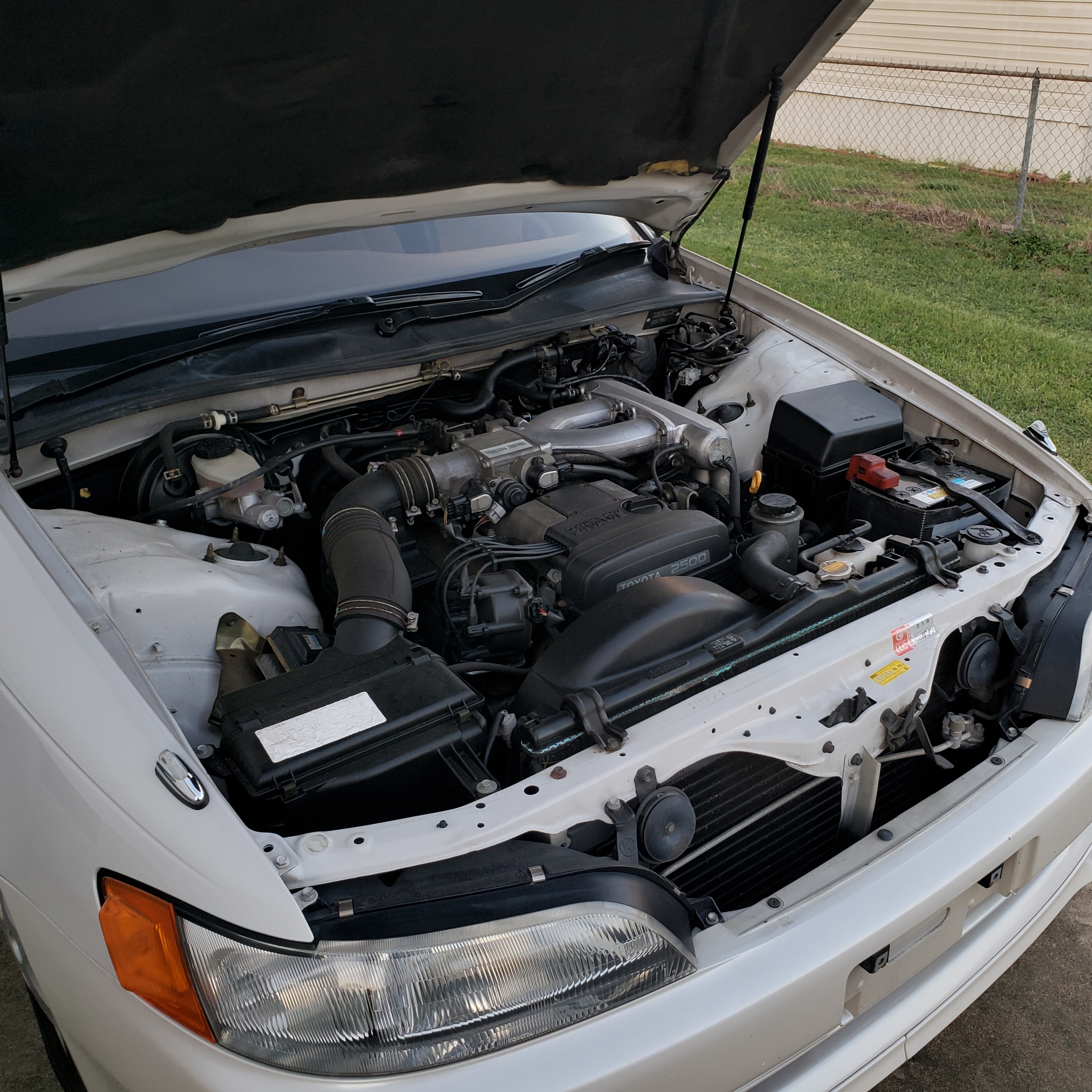
1996 Toyota Mark II Grande G (X90) shown with a 1JZ-GE (non VVT-i)

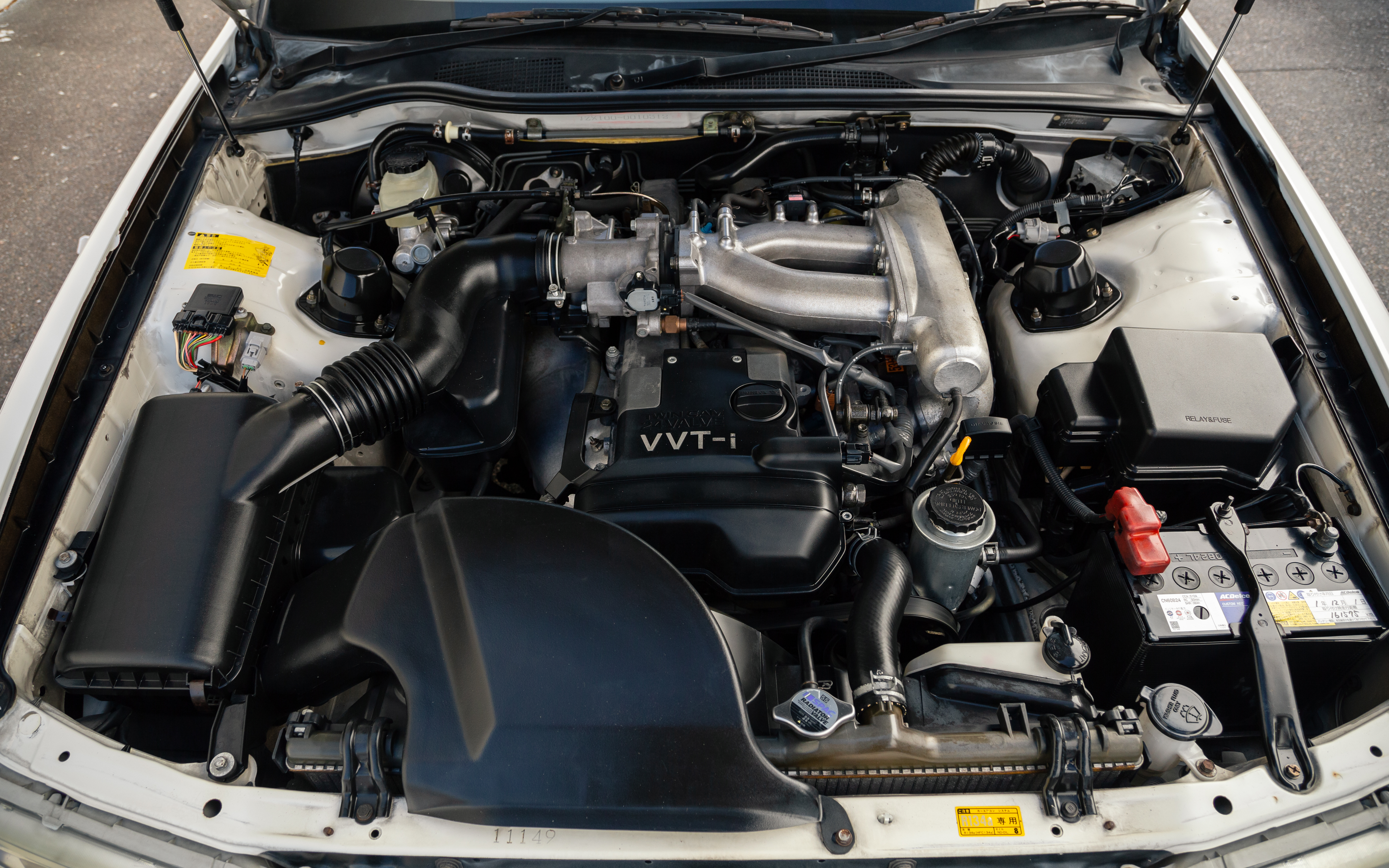
1JZ-GE VVT-i in a Toyota Mark II (X100)

The 1JZ-GE is a common version, with a 10:1 compression ratio, weighing 200 kg (440 lb). Output for the early non-turbo, non-VVT-i (1990–1996) 1JZ-GE was 125 kW (168 bhp; 170 PS) at 6000 rpm and 235 N⋅m (173 lb⋅ft) at 4800 rpm. VVT-i variable valve timing was added in 1995, for an output of 147 kW (197 bhp; 200 PS) at 6000 rpm and 251 N⋅m (185 lb⋅ft) at 4000 rpm.

Like all JZ-series engines, the early 1JZ-GE is designed for longitudinal mounting and rear-wheel-drive. All cars equipped with the 1JZ-GE only came with a 4-speed automatic transmission; no manual gearbox option was offered. The early non-turbo, non-VVT-i 1JZ-GE is a non-interference engine.

Applications:

- Mark II
- Chaser
- Cresta
- Crown
- Soarer
- Progres

=== 1JZ-GTE ===
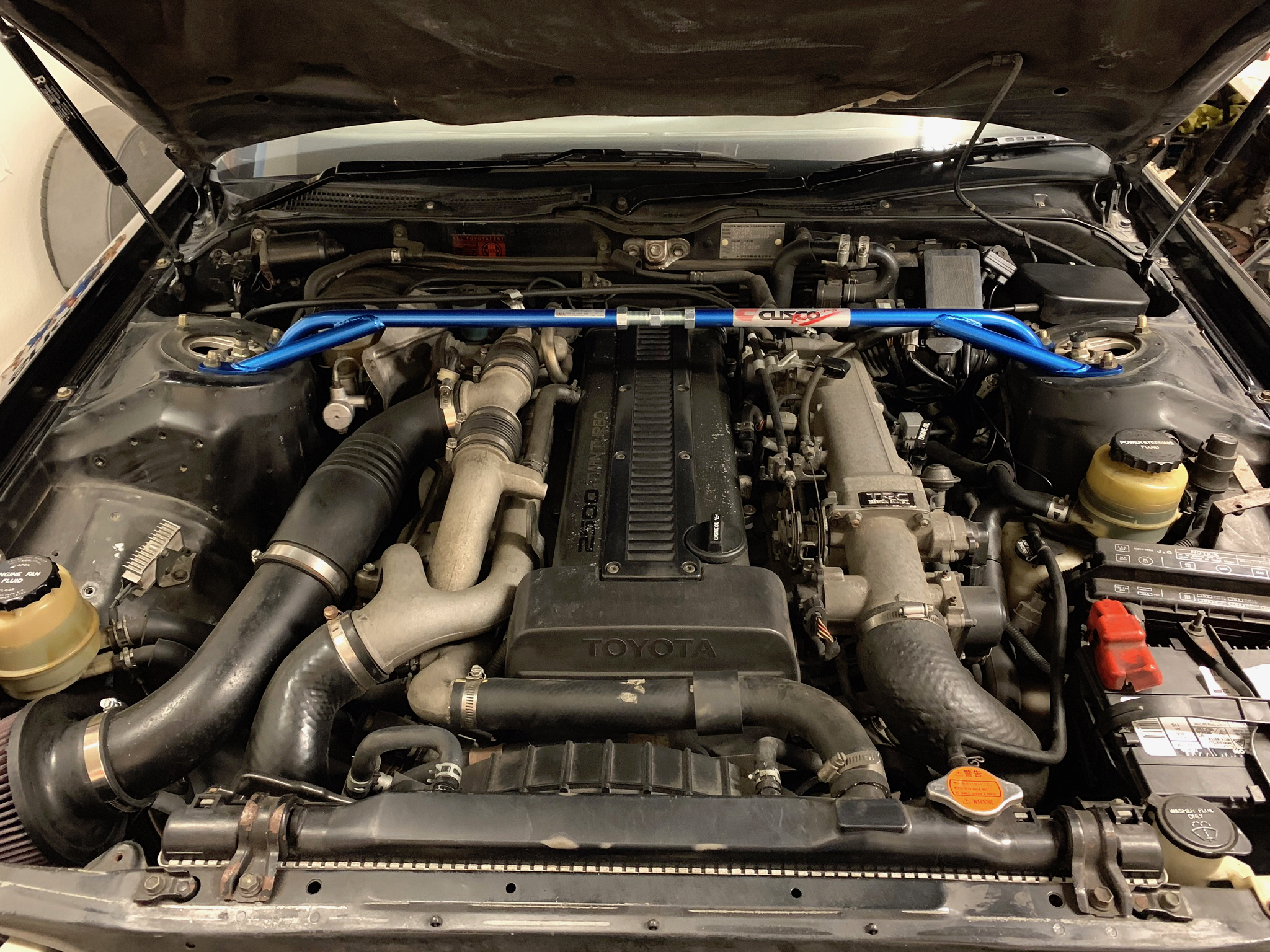
1JZ-GTE (non VVT-i) in a 1991 Toyota Mark II 2.5GT Twin Turbo

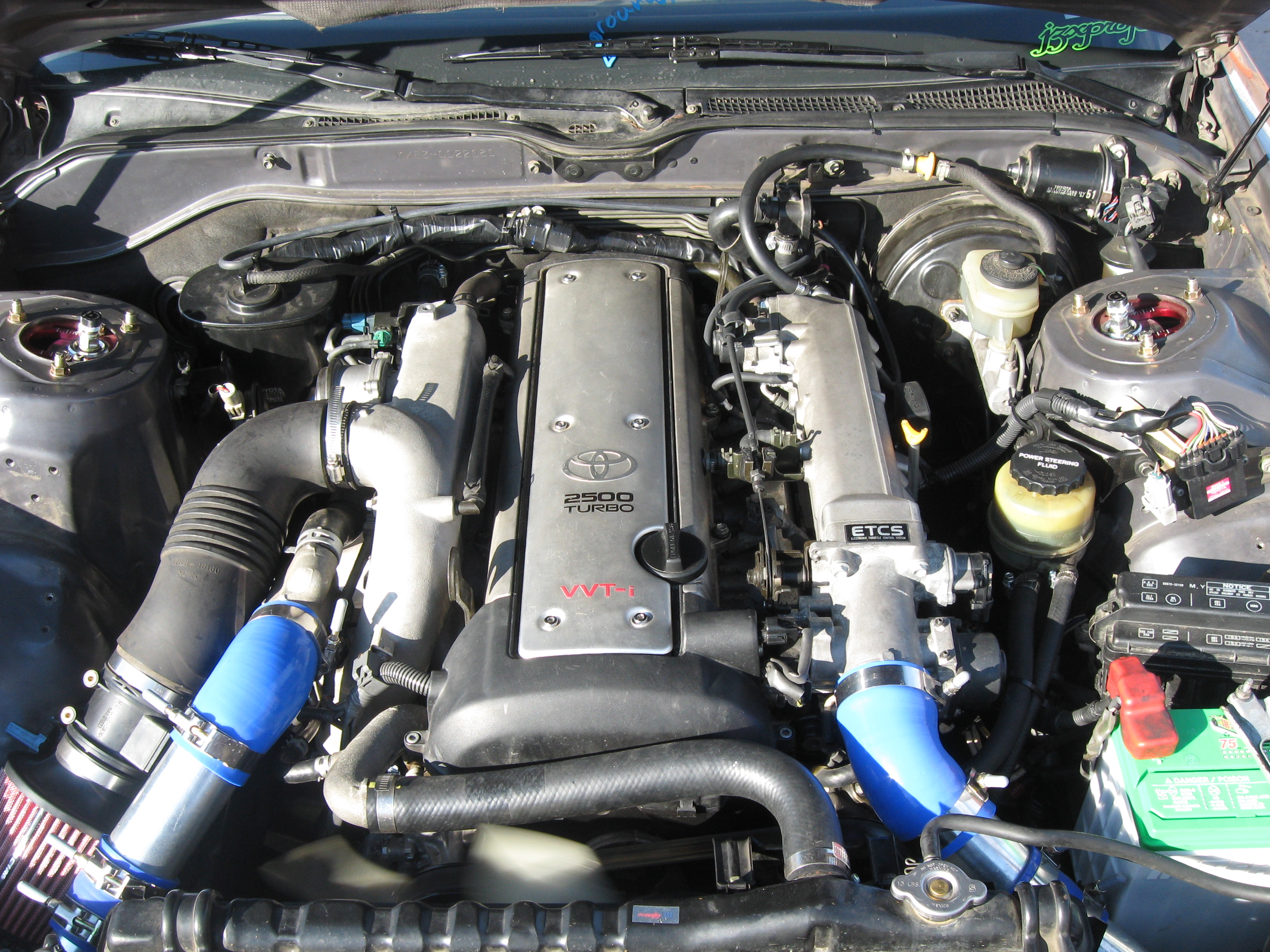
Third Generation 1JZ-GTE VVT-i transplanted into a 1989 MX83 Toyota Cressida

The 1JZ-GTE is a twin-turbocharged version of the 1JZ, produced from 1990 to 2007. The first generation 1JZ-GTE employs twin CT12A turbochargers arranged in parallel and blowing through a side-mount or front mount air-to-air intercooler weighing 210 kg (465 lb). With an 8.5:1 static compression ratio, the factory quoted power and torque outputs are 280 PS (206 kW; 276 hp) at 6200 rpm and 363 N⋅m (268 lbf⋅ft) at 4800 rpm. The bore and stroke are the same as for the 1JZ-GE: bore × stroke is 86 mm × 71.5 mm (3.39 in × 2.81 in). In 1991, the 1JZ-GTE was slotted into the all-new Soarer GT.

The first-generation 1JZ-GTEs used ceramic turbine wheels, which are prone to delamination in the setting of high impeller rpm and local temperature conditions. The first generation 1JZs were even more prone to turbo failure due to there being a faulty one-way valve on the head, specifically on the intake cam cover causing blow-by gases to go into the intake manifold. On the exhaust side, a decent amount of oil vapor flows into the turbos causing premature wear on the seals. The second generation engines fixed this problem. In Japan, there was a recall made in order to repair the first generation engines. This, however, does not apply to 1JZs exported to other countries in the interim.

The third generation of the 1JZ-GTE was introduced around 1996, still as a 2.5-litre turbo, but with Toyota's BEAMS architecture. This included a reworked head, newly developed continuously variable valve timing mechanism (VVT-i), modified water jackets for improved cylinder cooling and newly developed shims with a titanium nitride coating for reduced cam friction. The turbo setup changed from parallel twin turbo (CT12A x2) to a single turbo (CT15B). The single turbo is in part made more efficient by the use of smaller exhaust ports in the head, this allows the escaping exhaust gasses to have more velocity as they exit the head, which in turn, spools the turbo faster and at lower RPM.The adoption of VVT-i and the improved cylinder cooling allowed the compression ratio to be increased from 8.5:1 to 9.0:1. The official power figures remained at 280 PS (206 kW; 276 hp) at 6200 rpm, the torque was increased by 20 N⋅m (15 lbf⋅ft) to 379 N⋅m (280 lbf⋅ft) at 2400 rpm. These improvements resulted in increased engine efficiency that reduced fuel consumption by 10%. The adoption of VVTi, a higher efficiency single turbocharger as well as different manifold and exhaust ports were responsible for most of the 50% torque increase at low engine speeds. This engine was used primarily in Toyota's X chassis cars (Chaser, Mark II, Cresta, Verossa, Blit), the Crown Athlete V (JZS171) and in the later JZZ30 Soarer.

Applications:

- Toyota Chaser/Cresta/Mark II 2.5GT Twin Turbo (JZX81)
- Toyota Chaser/Cresta/Mark II Tourer V/Roulant G (JZX90, JZX100)
- Toyota Mark II iR-V (JZX110)
- Toyota Mark II Blit iR-V (JZX110W)
- Toyota Soarer 2.5 GT-T(JZZ30)
- Toyota Supra MK III 2.5 Twin Turbo (R) (JZA70)
- Toyota Verossa VR25 (JZX110)
- Toyota Crown Athlete V (JZS171 sedan and JZS171W wagon)

=== 1JZ-FSE ===
Around 2000, Toyota introduced the FSE direct injection variants. These FSE 1JZ and 2JZ engines are aimed at achieving minimal emissions and fuel consumption together with no loss of performance.

The 2.5-litre 1JZ-FSE employs the same block as the conventional 1JZ-GE; however, the design of the cylinder head is unique. The ‘D4’ FSE employs a relatively narrow angle cylinder head with swirl control valves that serve to improve combustion efficiency. This is necessary to run at extremely lean air-fuel ratios around 20 to 40:1 at certain engine load and revs. Not surprisingly, fuel consumption is reduced by around 20 percent (when tested in the Japanese 10/15 urban mode). Normal unleaded fuel is enough to cope with the FSE's 11:1 compression ratio.

The direct injection version of the 1JZ generates 147 kW (200 PS; 197 hp) and 250 N⋅m (184 lb⋅ft) – virtually the same as the conventional VVT-i 1JZ-GE. The 1JZ-FSE is always used with an automatic transmission.

Applications:

- Mark II
- Mark II Blit
- Brevis
- Progres
- Verossa
- Crown

== 2JZ ==
The 2,997 cc (3.0 L; 182.9 cu in) 2JZ was produced from 1991 (first released in the 1991 Toyota Aristo) to 2007. Cylinder bore and stroke is 86 mm × 86 mm (3.386 in × 3.386 in). VVT-i variable valve timing was first introduced in 1995 starting with the 2JZ-GE, but did not come to the 2JZ-GTE and the US-market 2JZ-GE engines until mid-1997 for the 1998 model year onwards. This engine is not merely a stroked version of the 1JZ (although they share a common bore size, bore pitch, and general architecture), but has a taller block deck and longer connecting rods to accommodate the 14.5 mm (0.57 in) stroke increase.

=== 2JZ-GE ===
The 2JZ-GE produced 215–230 PS (158–169 kW; 212–227 bhp) at 5800 to 6000 rpm and 209–220 lb⋅ft (283–298 N⋅m) of torque at 4800 to 5800 rpm.

The exterior design of the 1JZ-GE is retained in the 2JZ-GE, and reuses some parts from it. It uses Sequential Electronic Fuel Injection, has an aluminium head and 4 valves per cylinder, along with a cast-iron cylinder block. VVT-i was first introduced to the engines in 1995. The VVT-i version also featured DIS as opposed to the traditional distributor set-up previously seen on the 1JZ-GE. It was not a true COP (Coil-On-Plug, also known as Plug-top coil) ignition system, instead relying on one coil to fire two cylinders, one of which was by spark plug wire.

Applications:

- Toyota Altezza AS 300/Lexus IS 300
- Toyota Aristo/Lexus GS 300
- Toyota Crown/Crown Majesta
- Toyota Mark II/Chaser/Cresta
- Toyota Origin
- Toyota Progres
- Toyota Soarer/Lexus SC 300
- Toyota Supra

=== 2JZ-GTE ===
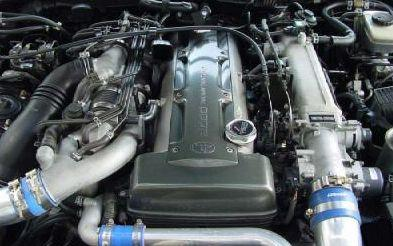
2JZ-GTE in a Toyota Supra (JZA80)

The 2JZ-GTE is an inline-layout, six-cylinder, belt-driven dual overhead camshaft, air-intercooled, twin-turbocharged, cast-iron block, aluminium cylinder head engine designed and manufactured by Toyota that was produced from 1991 to 2005 in Japan. Originally powering the Toyota Aristo V (JZS147) in 1991, it became Toyota's flagship performance engine in 1993 with the introduction of the Toyota Supra RZ (JZA80).

Its mechanical basis was of the existing 2JZ-GE, but differed in its use of sequential twin turbochargers and an air-to-air side-mounted intercooler. The engine block, crankshaft, and connecting rods of the Supra's 2JZ-GE and 2JZ-GTE are the same, some differences being that the 2JZ-GTE has recessed piston tops (giving a lower compression ratio), oil spray nozzles to aid in cooling the pistons and a different head (redesigned inlet/exhaust ports, cams and valves). Toyota's VVT-i variable valve timing technology was added to the engine beginning in September 1997, and hence it phased out production of the original engine in Japan. Consequently, maximum torque and horsepower was raised for engines selling in all markets. The later 2JZ-GE VVT-i equipped models (Aristo, Altezza and Mark II) shared a different part number for weaker connecting rods.

The addition of twin turbochargers, jointly developed by Toyota with Hitachi, in sequential configuration had raised its commercially cited output from 230 PS (169 kW; 227 hp) to the contemporary industry maximum of 318 PS (234 kW; 314 hp) at 6000 rpm. In its first appearance, torque was advertised as 44.3 kg⋅m (320 lb⋅ft; 434 N⋅m) at 3800 rpm to be later recited as 46 kg⋅m (333 lb⋅ft; 451 N⋅m) with the introduction of VVT-i in production year 1997. The mutually agreed, industry-wide output ceiling was enforced by Japan's now-defunct Gentlemen's Agreement exclusively between Japanese automakers selling to the Japanese domestic market. Engine power in the North American and European markets, as documented by Toyota, was increased to 320 hp (239 kW; 324 PS) at 5600 rpm.

The export version of the 2JZ-GTE achieved its higher power output with the use of newer stainless steel turbochargers (ceramic for Japanese models), revised camshafts, and larger injectors (550 cc/min for export, 440 cc/min for Japanese). The mechanical similarities between the Japanese-specification CT20 turbine and export-specification CT12B turbine allow interchangeability of the exhaust-side propeller shaft. Additionally, the export-exclusive CT12B turbine received more durable turbine housings and stainless steel turbine and impeller fins. Multiple variants of the Japanese CT20 turbine exist discretely, which are identified with the B, R, and A part number suffixes (e.g.: CT20A).

For all road car applications, two gearboxes were available for the engine:

- Toyota A340E 4-speed automatic
- Toyota V160 and V161 6-speed manual (jointly developed with Getrag as the Type 233)

Applications:

- Toyota Aristo 3.0V JZS147 (Japan-only)
- Toyota Aristo V300 JZS161 (Japan-only)
- Toyota Supra RZ/Turbo JZA80

=== 2JZ-FSE ===
Around 2000, Toyota introduced the FSE direct injection variants. These FSE 1JZ and 2JZ engines are aimed at achieving minimal emissions and fuel consumption together with no loss of performance.

The 3.0-litre 2JZ-FSE uses the same direct injection principle as the smaller 1JZ-FSE but runs an even higher 11.3:1 compression ratio. This engine features narrow angle cylinder heads with swirl control valves improving combustion efficiency (similar to the 1JZ-FSE) and weighs about 200 kg (440 lb). The 2JZ-FSE matches the conventional VVT-i 2JZ-GE with 162 kW (217 hp; 220 PS) and 294 N⋅m (217 lb⋅ft) of torque. The 2JZ-FSE is always used with an automatic transmission.

Applications:

- Toyota Brevis
- Toyota Progrès
- Toyota Crown (S170)
- Toyota Crown Majesta (S170)

== See also ==
- List of Toyota engines
