= Toyota Previa =

Multi-purpose vehicle (MPV)

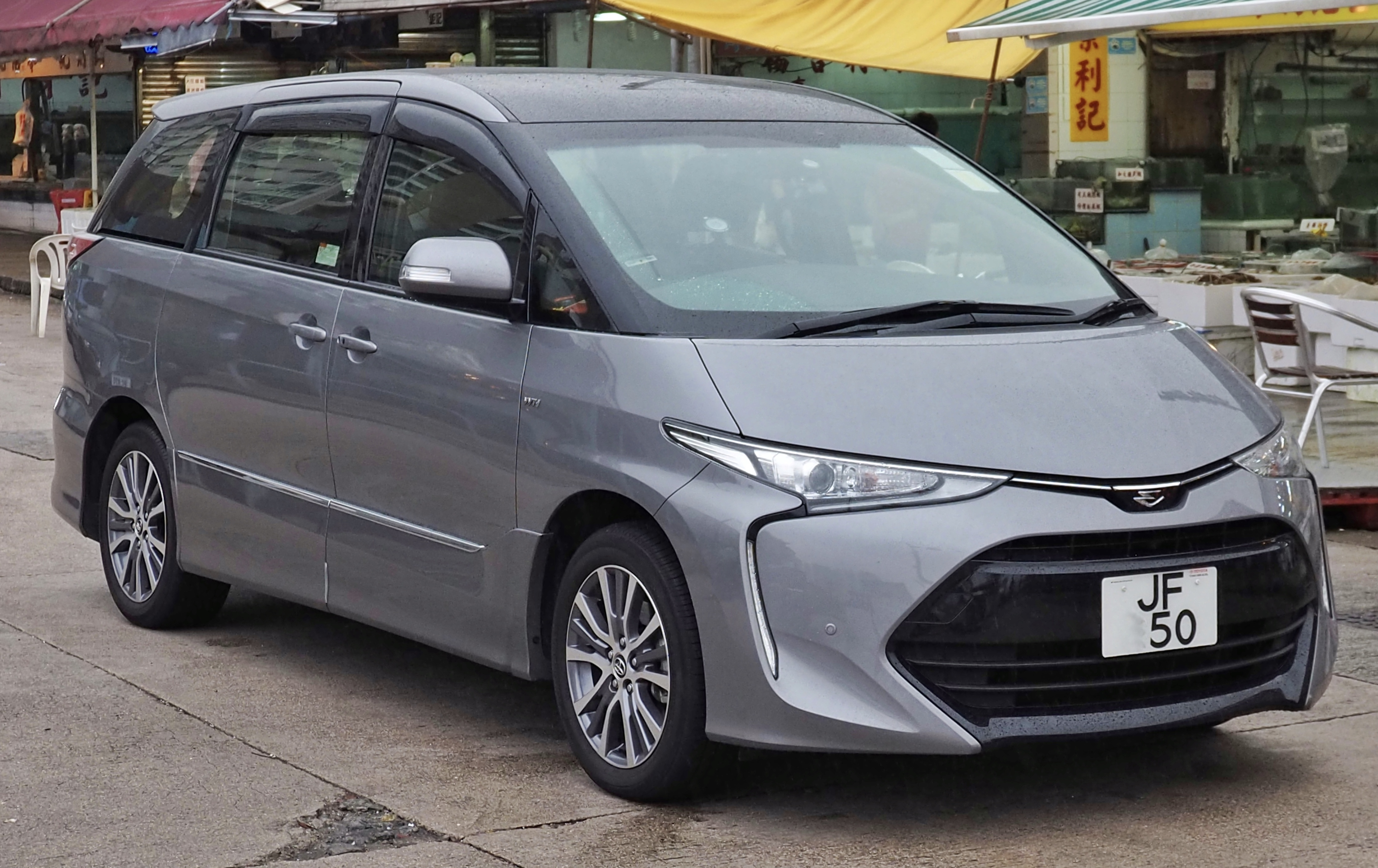
- 2016 Estima

Overview
- Manufacturer: Toyota
- Also called: Toyota Estima (Japan); Toyota Tarago (Australia)
- Production: January 1990 – October 2019

Body and chassis
- Class: Minivan
- Body style: 4/5-door minivan
- Layout: Front mid-engine, rear-wheel-drive (1990–1999); Front-engine, front-wheel-drive (2000–2019); Front-engine, all-wheel-drive (1990–1999, 2006–2019)

Chronology
- Predecessor: Toyota TownAce/MasterAce Surf (R20/R30)
- Successor: Toyota Sienna (North America and Taiwan); Toyota GranAce/Granvia (H300) (Japan, Australia, Taiwan and Middle East); Toyota Alphard (AH30) (Asia)

The Toyota Previa, also known as the Toyota Estima (Japanese: トヨタ・エスティマ, Hepburn: Toyota Esutima) in Japan, and Toyota Tarago in Australia, is a minivan that was produced by Toyota from 1990 until October 2019 across three generations. The Previa was the second largest minivan in Toyota's lineup in Japan after the bigger and more luxurious Alphard/Vellfire.

The name Previa, used in the United States and United Kingdom, is derived from the Italian previdenza, meaning 'providence' or 'foresight'. The name Estima is taken from the word estimable.

== First generation (XR10/XR20; 1990) ==
First generation
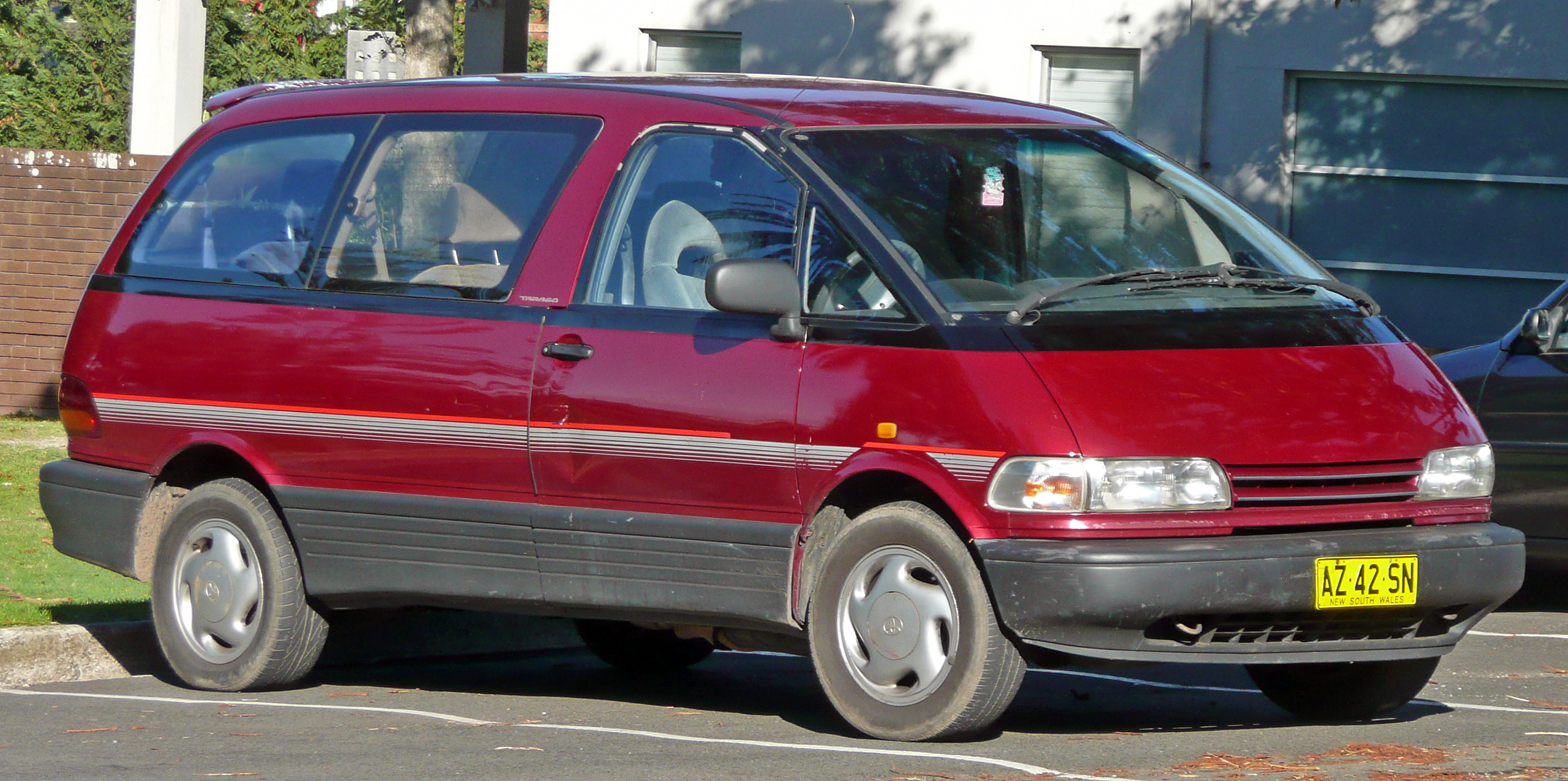
- 1990–1993 Toyota Tarago GLX (TCR11R, Australia)

Overview
- Model code: XR10; XR20
- Also called: Toyota Estima (Japan); Toyota Tarago (Australia); Jinhui Previa (China); Beijing Zhonglian Previa (China); Hongxing HX6482 (China)
- Production: January 1990 – December 1999
- Model years: 1991–1997 (North America)
- Assembly: Japan: Kariya, Aichi (Fujimatsu plant); China: Zhuhai, Guangdong (CKD)
- Designer: Tokuo Fukuichi; David Doyle (1987)

Body and chassis
- Layout: Front mid-engine, rear-wheel-drive layout; Front mid-engine, four-wheel-drive layout (All-Trac)

Powertrain
- Engine: Petrol: 2.4 L 2TZ-FE I4; 2.4 L 2TZ-FZE supercharged I4; Diesel: 2.2 L 3C-T/3C-TE turbo I4
- Transmission: 5-speed manual G57 (AWD), G59 (RWD); 4-speed automatic A46DF (AWD), A46DE (RWD); 4-speed automatic A340F (S/C AWD), A340E (S/C RWD)

Dimensions
- Wheelbase: 112.8 in (2,865 mm)
- Length: 1991–92, 1995–97: 4,750 mm (187.0 in); 1993–94: 4,760 mm (187.4 in)
- Width: 1,800 mm (70.9 in)
- Height: 1991–94 RWD: 1,745 mm (68.7 in); 1995–97 RWD: 1,781 mm (70.1 in); 1991–94 AWD: 1,755 mm (69.1 in); 1995–97 AWD: 1,791 mm (70.5 in)
- Curb weight: 1,703 kg (3,755 lb)

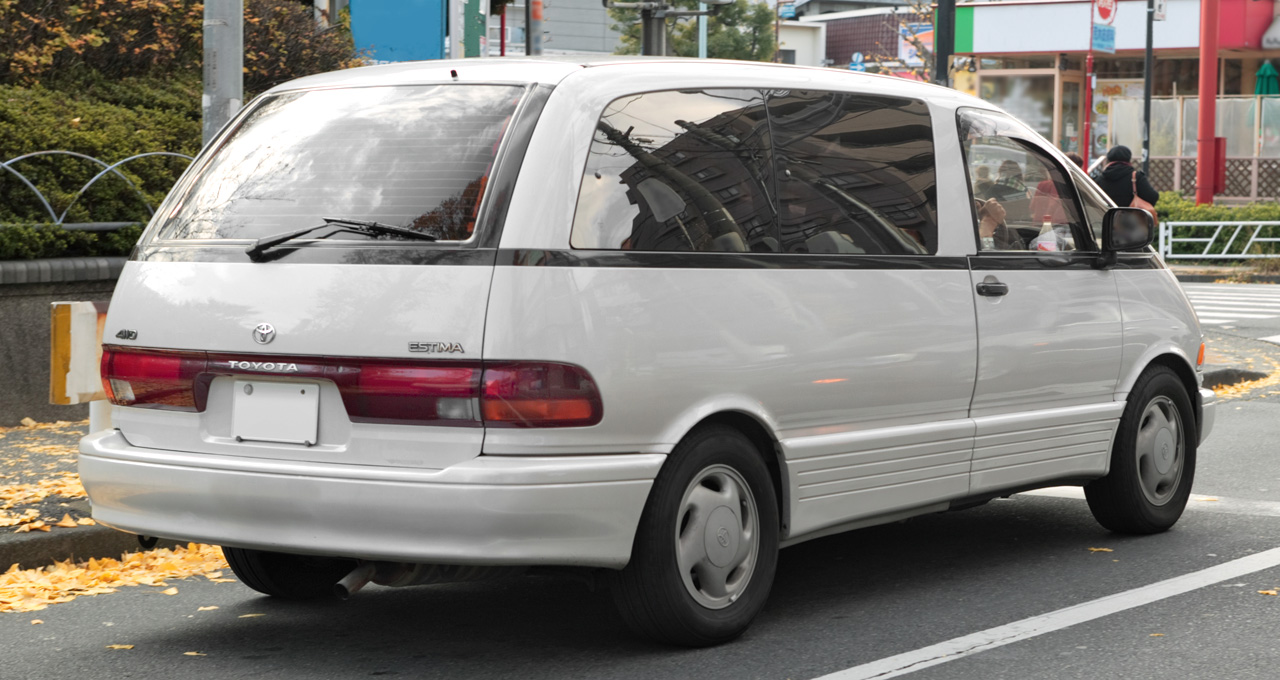
1990–1994 Toyota Estima (Japan)

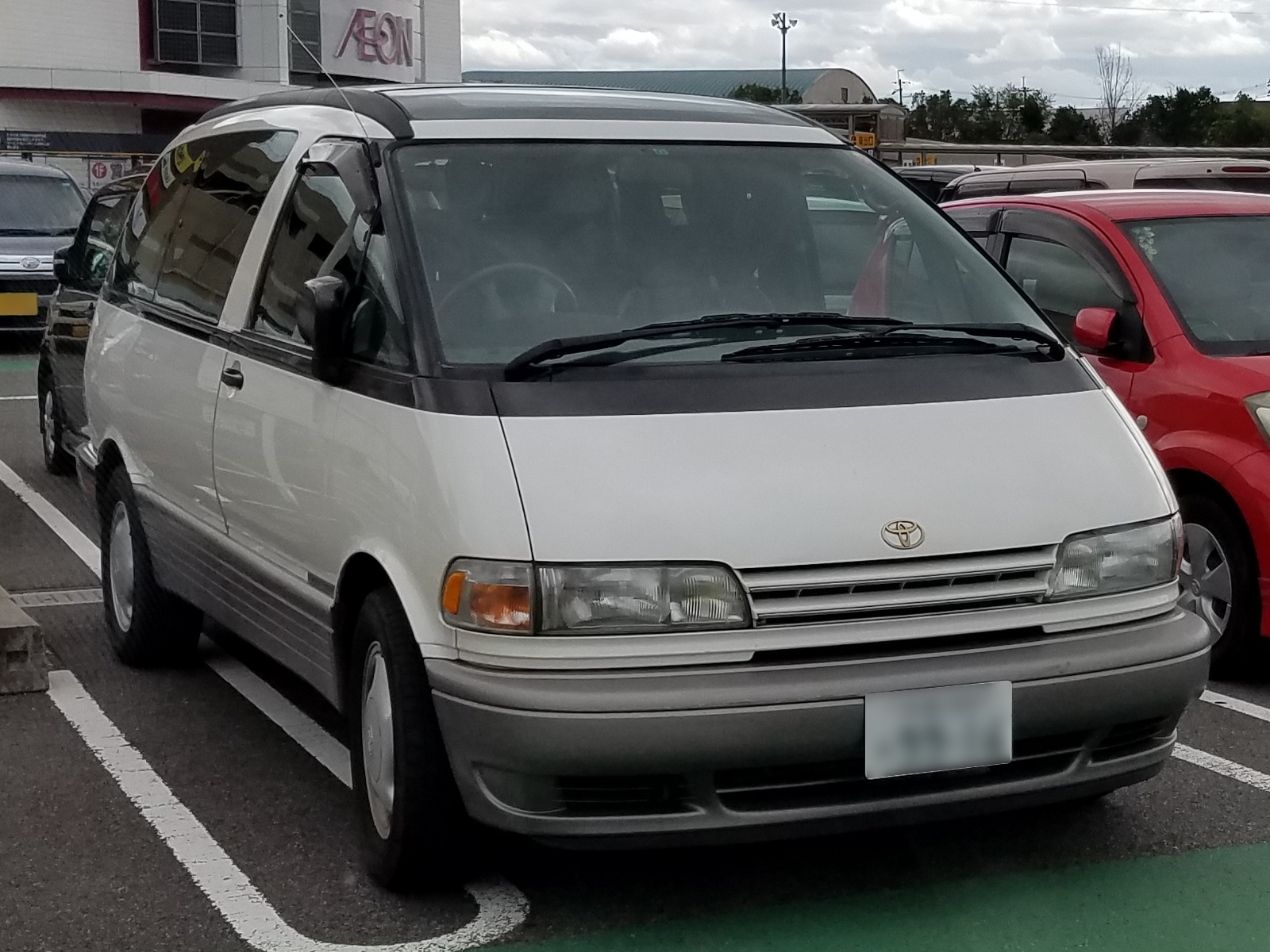
1994–1997 Toyota Estima (first facelift, Japan)

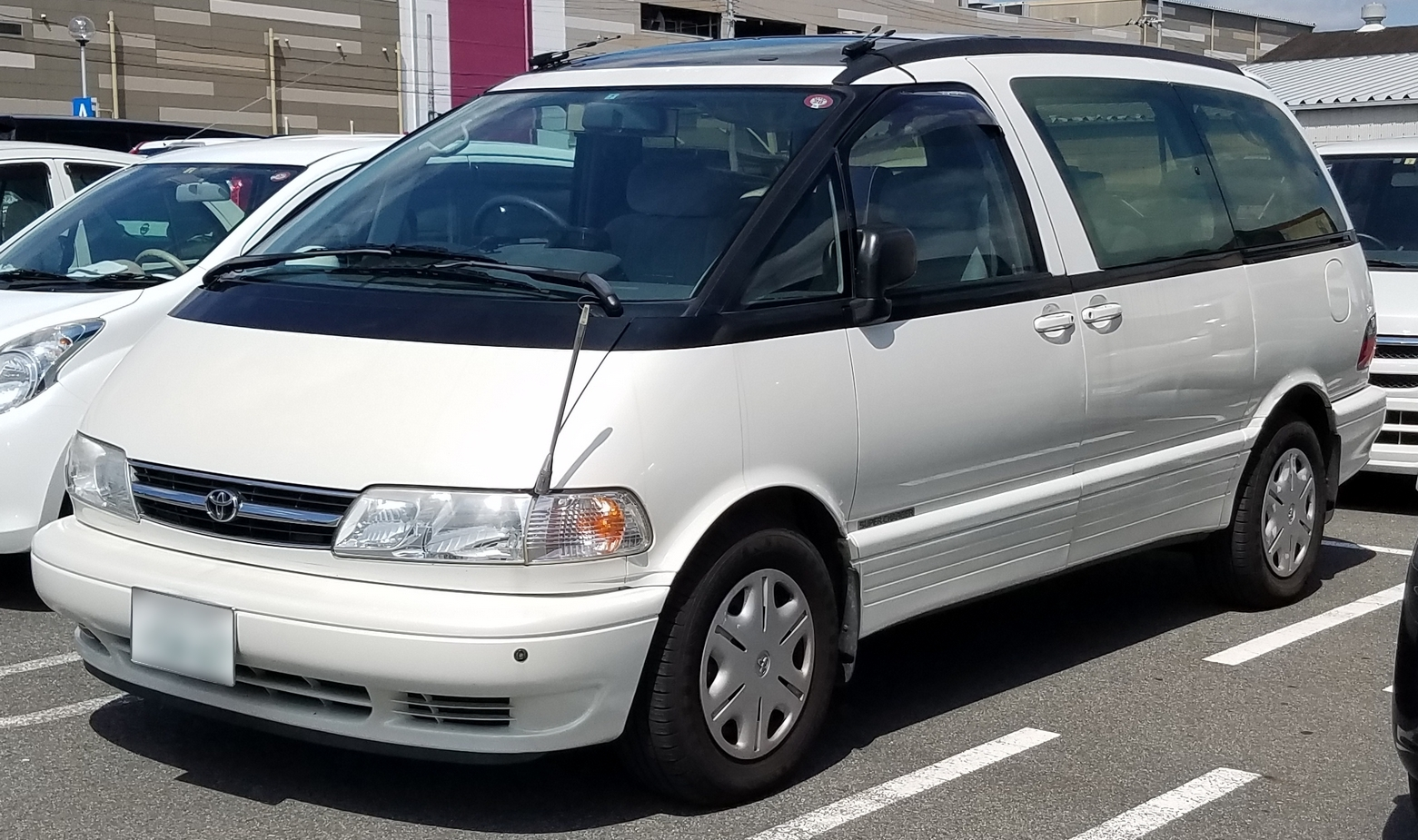
1998–1999 Toyota Estima (second facelift)

The first generation, designed by Toyota designer Tokuo Fukuichi and Calty designer David Doyle in 1987 (patent filed 24 December 1987), was introduced on 27 January 1990, and had only one sliding side door for the rear passengers. It featured a mid-engined platform, where the inline-four cylinder gasoline-powered engine was installed almost flat beneath the front seats, canted at a 75-degree angle from vertical to the right, viewed from the rear of the vehicle. This allowed the designers to maximize interior space for a given exterior size.

The first generation Previa is 4,750 mm (187.0 in) long, 1,800 mm (70.9 in) wide, and 1,780 mm (69.9 in) high (with the dual moonroof option), riding on a wheelbase of 2,870 mm (112.8 in). It was available in both rear- and all-wheel drive versions (branded All-Trac) and powered by a 135 PS (99 kW) JIS inline four-cylinder 2.4-liter fuel-injected mid-mounted engine. All-wheel drive models use a viscous-coupled center differential which normally splits torque 50/50 from front to rear. Available with a four-speed automatic or five-speed manual gearbox, this Previa also seated seven or eight people, with three seating configurations offered; however, North America only received two configurations, both seating seven passengers. All first-generation Previa / Estima vans were assembled at the Toyota Auto Body Fujimatsu plant in Kariya, Aichi.

The Previa was available with either four-wheel disc brakes or traditional front disc/rear drum brake setup, with anti-lock brakes (ABS) as an option. Some rear-drive models use independent suspension at all four wheels, with Macpherson struts at the front and double-wishbones in the rear; most models are equipped with a rear suspension which uses a beam axle located by a four-link arrangement with Panhard rod. A lower-cost eight-passenger model, introduced in February 1993, uses the AWD rear suspension.

=== Design ===
==== Powertrain ====
The Previa / Estima was equipped with a 2.4 L 2TZ-FE I4 engine with a nominal output of 99 kW (133 hp; 135 PS) at 5000 rpm and 206 N⋅m (152 lb⋅ft) at 4000 rpm. Base models were equipped with a five-speed manual transmission, a four-speed automatic transmission was available as an option; higher trim levels came with the automatic as standard. For the 1994 model year, the 2.4 L 2TZ-FZE supercharged engine was made available. The supercharger was mounted in the front of the vehicle, driven by a belt off the SADS accessory driveshaft, and engine output increased to 120 kW; 161 hp; 163 PS at 5000 rpm and 273 N⋅m (201 lb⋅ft) at 3600 rpm. In the United States, the five-speed manual transmission was discontinued starting with the 1994 model year.

In Japan, the Estima Lucida and Estima Emina also were available with the 3C-T intercooled turbodiesel I4 engine.

With either engine, all of the engine-driven accessories, such as the alternator, power steering pump, air conditioning compressor and radiator fan, are accessible from the front hood and are driven by an accessory driveshaft extending forward from the front of the engine, which was named "Supplemental Accessory Drive System" (SADS). A two-liter oil reservoir is also located underneath the hood. Placing these items in front allowed the designers to achieve a nearly-equal front/rear weight distribution, which benefits ride quality and handling. However, it also prevented the installation of a larger engine, and meant that the design and development costs could not be mitigated by sharing the platform with other vehicles. The mid-engine configuration requires the removal of the front right seat, the carpet and an access panel to provide access to the spark plugs.

Fuel efficiency with the naturally aspirated 2TZ-FE engine is below average at 18–20 mpg_{‑US} (13–12 L/100 km) for estimated combined city/highway driving; the small four-cylinder engine needs to work a bit harder owing to the power to weight ratio of the vehicle, compared to contemporary 6-cylinder engines. In instrumented testing, a rear-drive Previa with the naturally aspirated engine recorded 20 mpg_{‑US} (12 L/100 km) overall. With all-wheel drive and the automatic, observed fuel consumption increased to 17 mpg_{‑US} (14 L/100 km).

The supercharged 2TZ-FZE engine is different from the normally aspirated engine, owing to a slight decrease in compression ratio and stronger engine internals. The supercharger is sourced from Aisin and engaged on-demand by an electromagnetic clutch, based on input from the engine control unit. The supercharged engine has improved power and gives slightly better fuel consumption, estimated at 19 mpg_{‑US} (12 L/100 km) on the combined city/highway cycle.

==== Styling & interior ====
All configurations have a driver and front passenger seat forward, and a three-seat bench seat at the rear that splits and folds flat against the sides of the cabin. The eight-seat configuration contains a 2/1 split swiveling bench seat in the middle row, while the seven-seat configurations contain either two independently swiveling captain's chairs (referred to as "Quad Seating"), in the middle row or a two-seat bench offset towards the driver's side. The third row is better upholstered in the seven-seat version.

The center console is pushed backwards towards the front seat passengers, with contemporary press coverage calling it "pregnant". The stereo was singled out for praise during a long-term test review conducted by Popular Mechanics.

- The Previa gives a practically panoramic view, excluding the pillars behind the front doors. This has the side effect of effectively turning the van into a greenhouse, causing it to accumulate heat in a short period of time. Solar control glass later became an option to help alleviate the problem.

An option for dual moonroofs was provided. This included a power horizontal-sliding glass moonroof above the middle row of passengers, measuring 32×40 in (810×1,020 mm), and a pop-up glass moonroof above the front seats. The overall height of Previas equipped with moonroofs is increased by 30 mm (1.2 in) so the interior headroom is not reduced.

Previas are affectionately called "eggvans", "eggs" or "beans", because of their shape. In Australia, they have been referred to as "Wombats", because they somewhat resemble the marsupial of the same name. In New Zealand, they are very popular with freedom campers and are referred to as "Bucky" buses.

The Estima/Previa received a facelift twice, namely in December 1994 and January 1998. Each facelift model can be distinguished by a different front grille design.

=== Safety ===
The Previa was the first minivan to meet all US safety standards for passenger cars for the 1992 model year, which included fitment of a driver's-side airbag, under-dash knee bolsters, and a center high-mounted stop light.

When the Insurance Institute for Highway Safety tested a 1996 model Previa in the moderate overlap front crash test, it revealed many safety issues: the cabin structure was unstable, the steering wheel moved upward all the way to the windshield causing violent head movement, the lap belt tore which allowed the dummy to end up in a partially reclining position, and there were high forces on both of the lower legs, as well as high forces on the head and neck. It was given a "Poor" rating as a result.

=== Global variations ===
In some countries (mainly Australia, Japan and the United Kingdom), unsold Estimas and Lucidas were re-badged as 1995/1996 Previas.

==== Japan ====
In Japan, two smaller versions, the Toyota Estima Lucida and Toyota Estima Emina, were produced from 13 January 1992, each of which were approximately 110 mm (4.3 in) narrower and 70 mm (2.8 in) shorter than the standard model. The original design continued to be sold in Japan, but became known as the "wide-body" Estima.

The reason that the smaller Emina and Lucida models were developed is the vehicle tax system in Japan, which is based on the product of the length and width of the car; the smaller variants fall into a lower tax band. The Estima Emina and Estima Lucida were also available with a 2.2-liter diesel engine (3C-T and 3C-TE). In Japan, the Estima and Estima Emina were exclusive to the dealerships called Toyota Store. The Estima Lucida sold at Toyota Corolla Store dealerships.

The two received a minor facelift in 1995 and a facelift in 1996.

Estima Emina

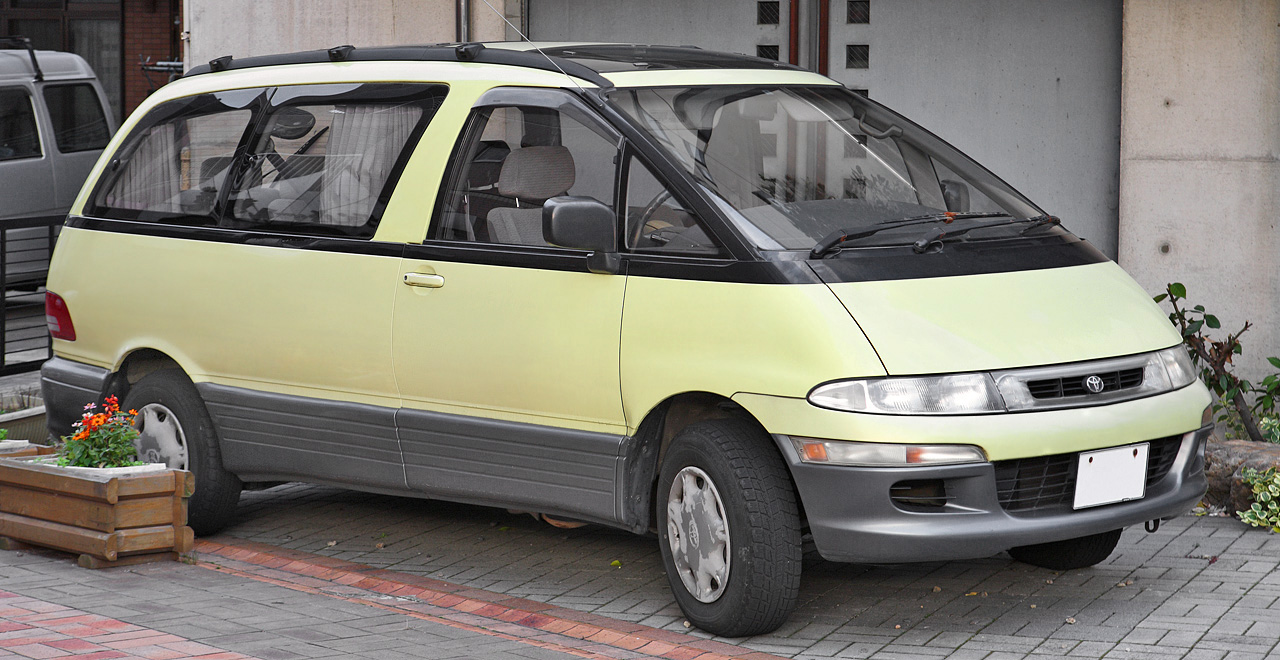
1992–1994 Toyota Estima Emina (Japan)

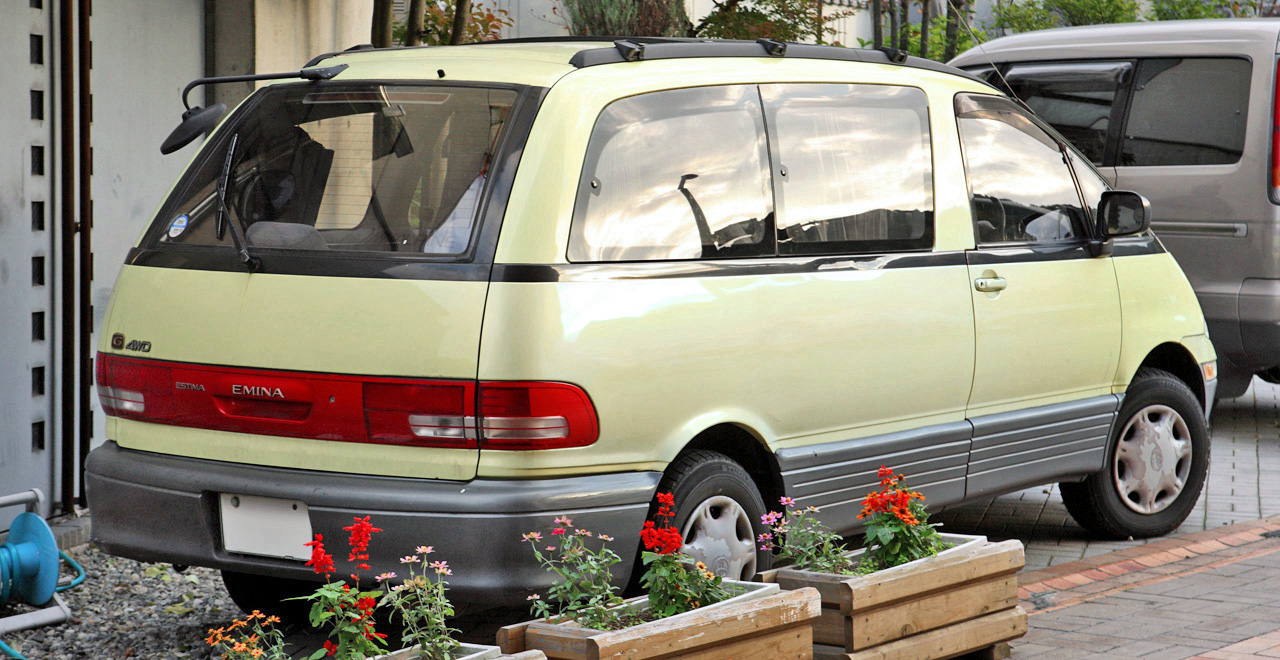
1992–1994 Toyota Estima Emina (Japan)

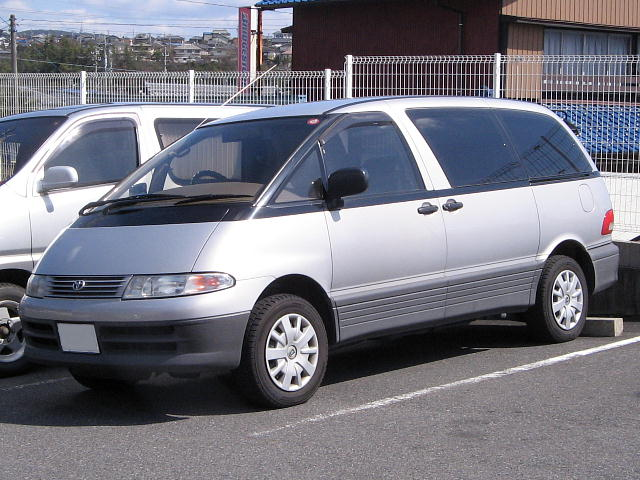
1994–1996 Toyota Estima Emina (Japan)

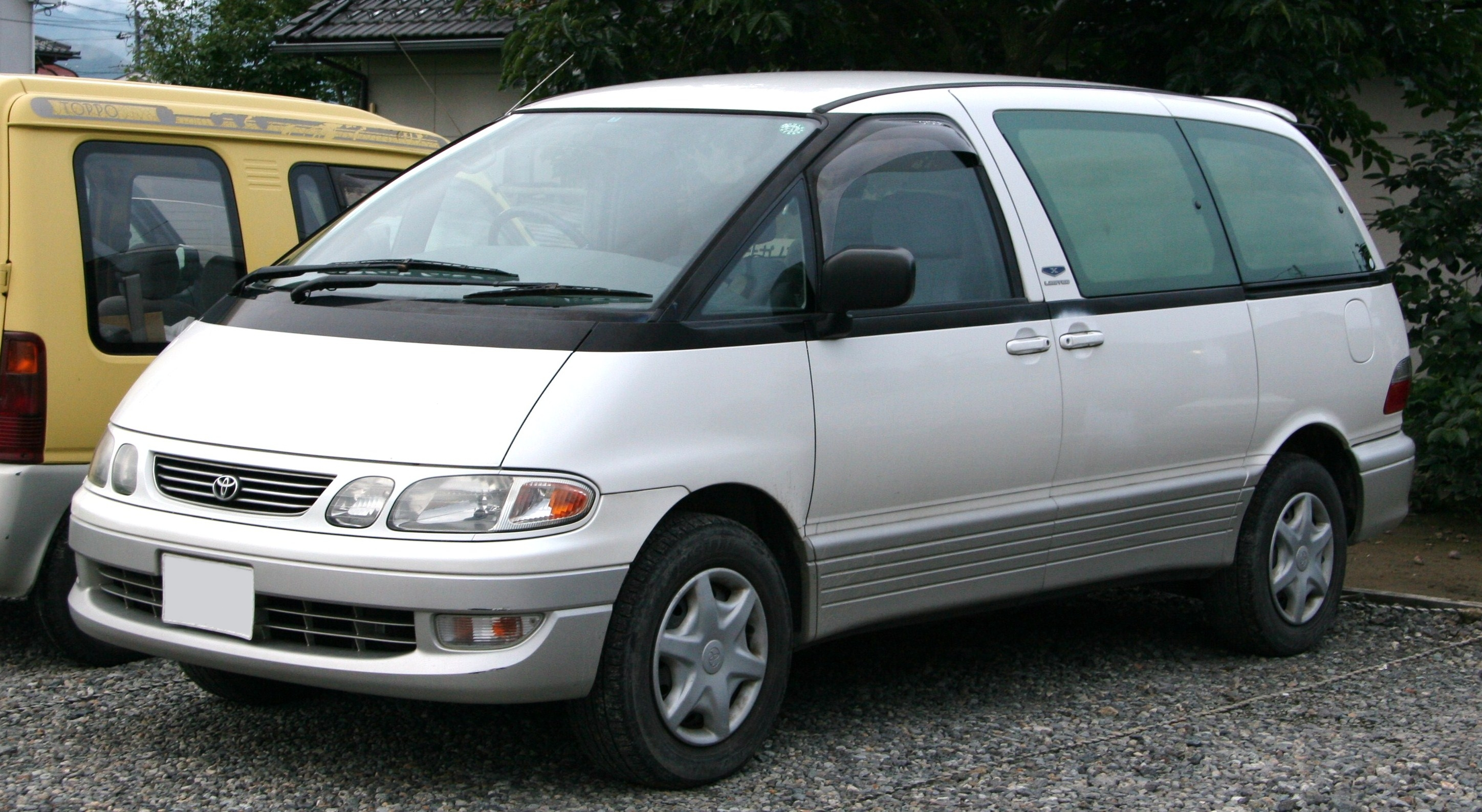
1996–1999 Toyota Estima Emina (Japan)

Estima Lucida

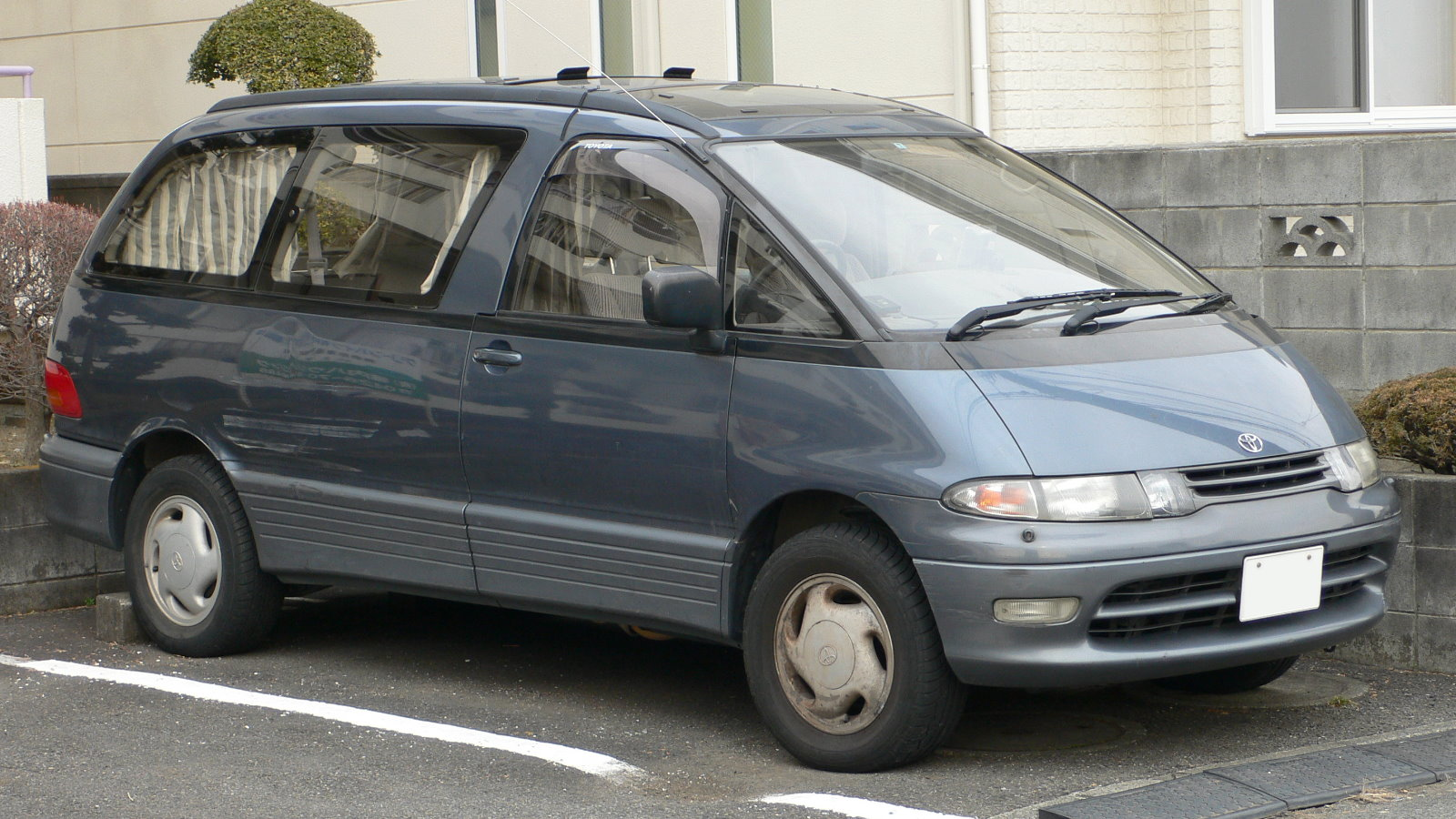
1992–1994 Toyota Estima Lucida (Japan)

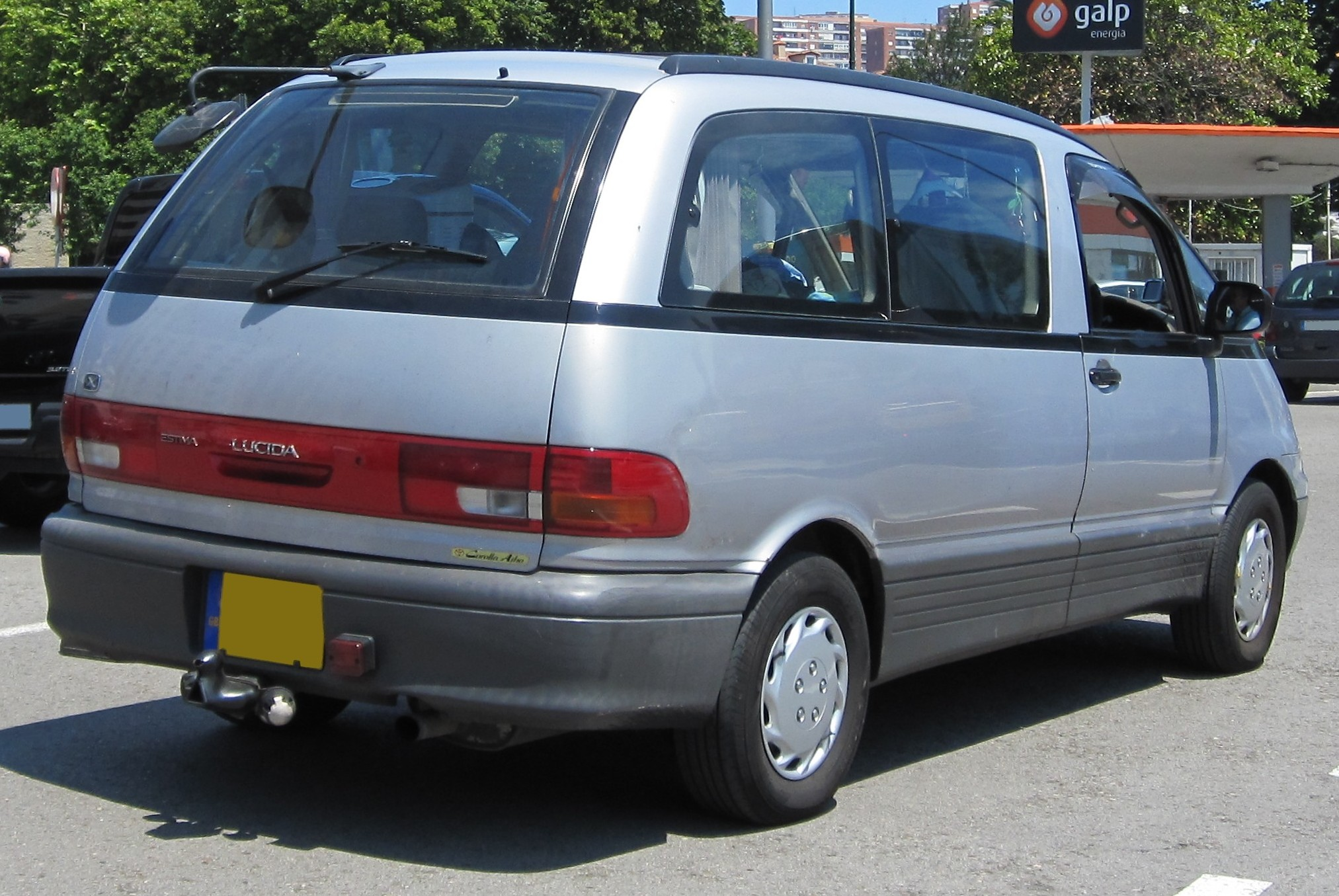
1992–1994 Toyota Estima Lucida (Japan)

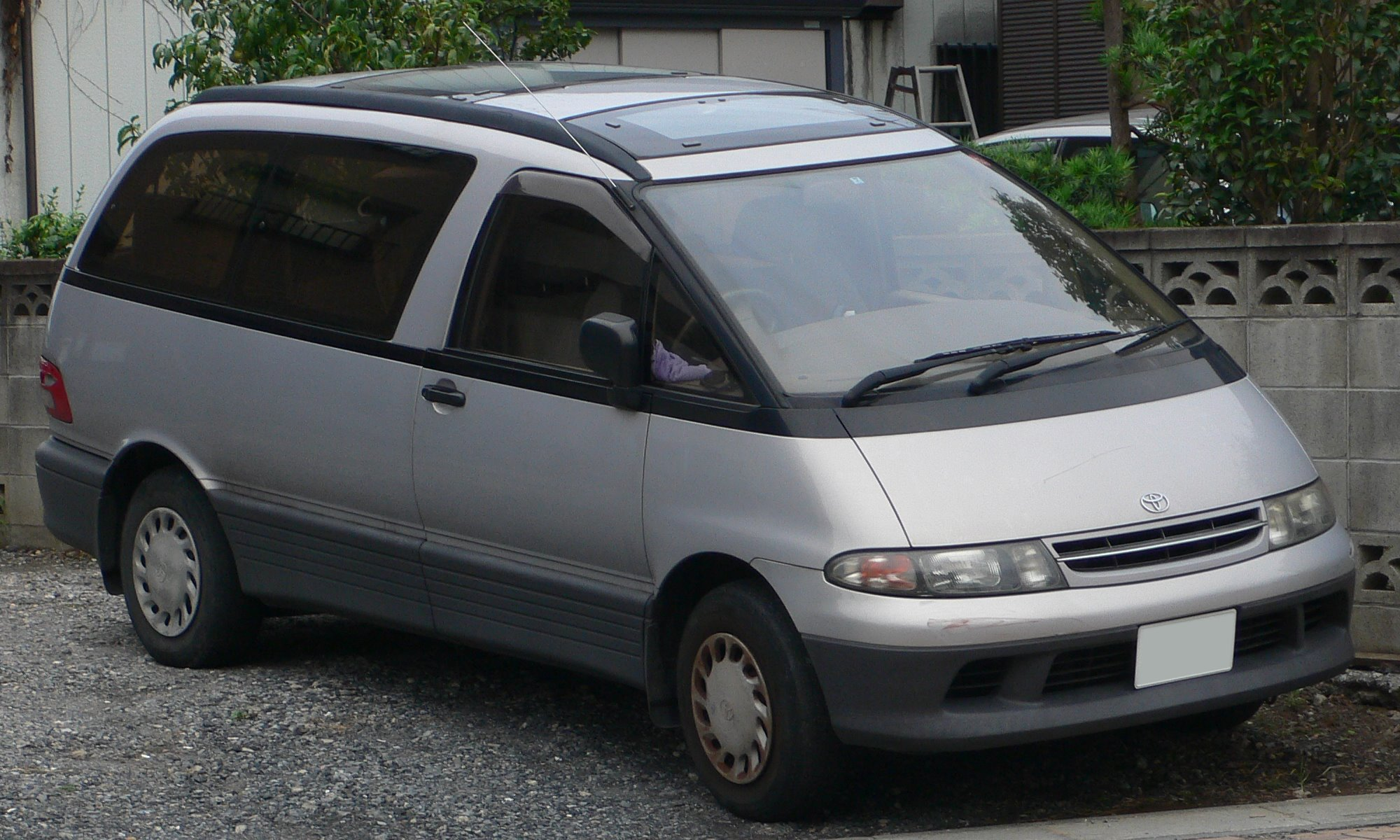
1994–1996 Toyota Estima Lucida (Japan)

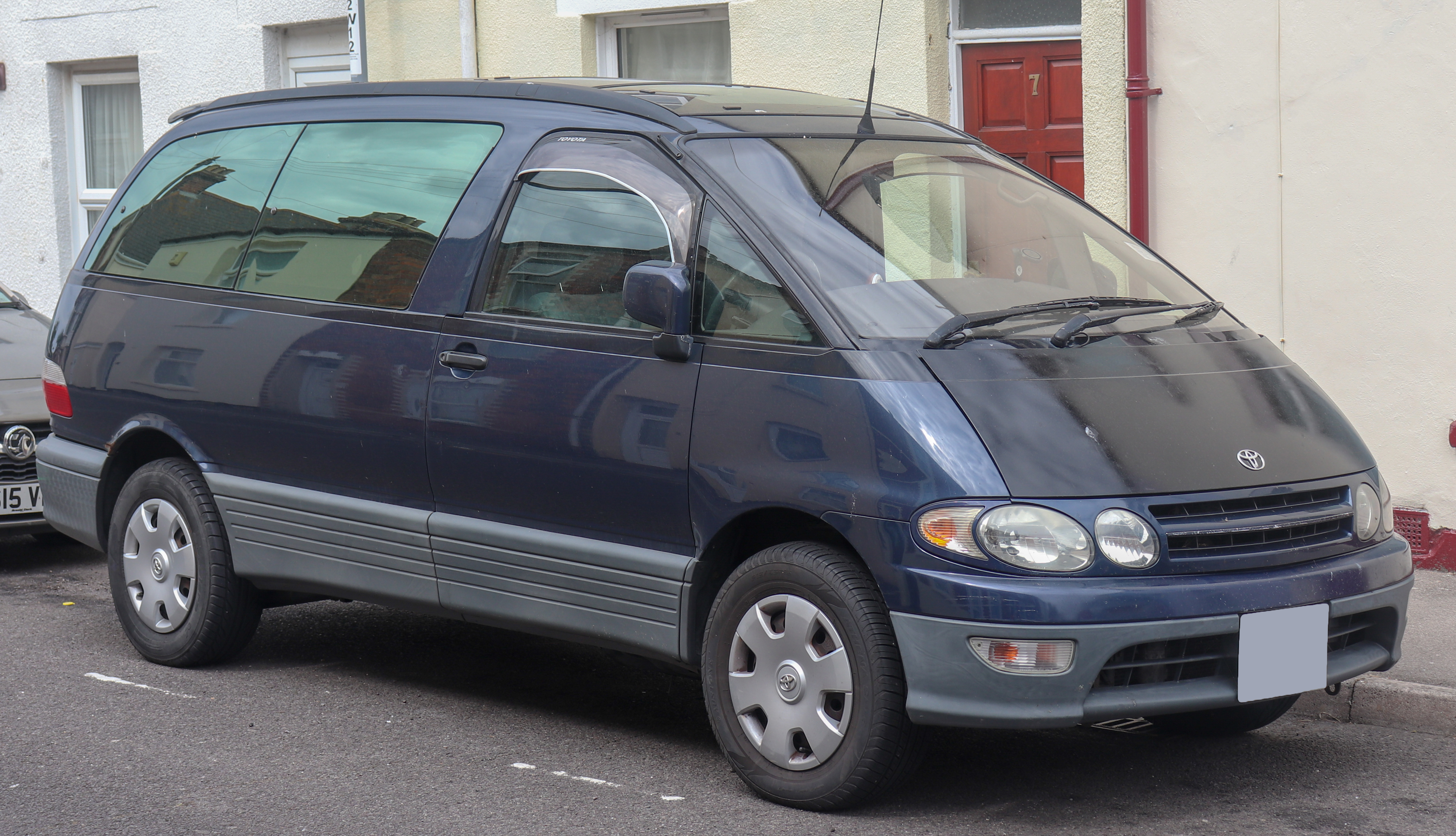
1996–1999 Toyota Estima Lucida (Japan)

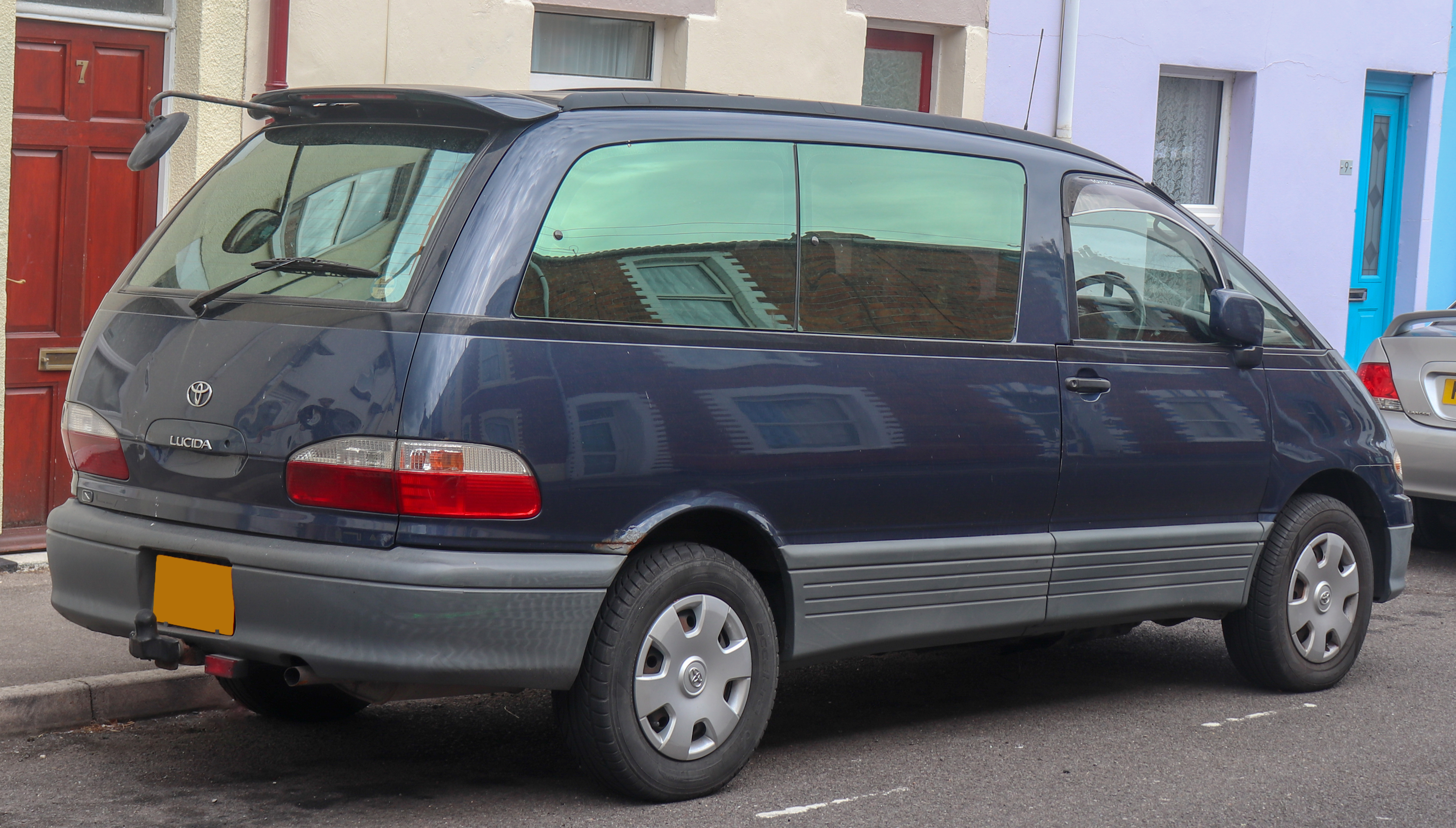
1996–1999 Toyota Estima Lucida (Japan)

==== Australia ====
In Australia, the van was marketed as the Tarago, offered in GL/GLi, GLS and GLX forms with 7–8 passenger seating from launch in September 1990. In addition to the Australian market, there were various special edition models available, which varied in trim levels. These include the RV (either 5-speed manual or 4-speed automatic with 4WD), commemorative Rugby World Cup editions and Getaway. Feature-wise, all of the special edition models are marketed between the base GLi and GLX models. When the later-style update models were released in Australia, the top-of-the-line GLS model was renamed "Ultima" and the Getaway became a mainstay trim level, being renamed Getaway II.

==== Netherlands ====
The first generation Previa was marketed in the Netherlands between 1991 and 1994. In 1994, the supercharged or SC model was made standard on all Previas. The only engine available was a 2.4-liter 4-cylinder engine until 1995. Trim levels were base (later renamed to i denoting an injection engine), GL, GLi and GXi. The 2.2-liter diesel version was a popular grey import.

==== Philippines ====
During the rampant importation and popularity of affordable, used Japanese grey market vehicles among Filipinos, thousands of both Lucida and Emina Estimas was brought to Philippine shores. They're the same Japan market models with the exception of being converted from right-hand drive to left-hand drive to comply with Philippine law and in order to be legally registered with Land Transportation Office. Conversion and sales was handled by several grey import dealerships inside Port Irene, in Sta.Ana, Cagayan. As local car manufacturers in the Philippines continued to express their worries over the grey import market hurting their overall sales, the Supreme Court of the Philippines finally approved the implementation of Executive Order 156 and 418 in February 2013 which completely banned further sales and registration of unsold, used surplus cars and as well as several grey imports from Japan, South Korea, and the United States. It carried on until 2014 for the full shutdown. As of 2022, those converted vehicles including the Eminas and Lucidas that never left Port Irene continued to rot or became a parts donor for other vehicles. As of 2026, those vans still has a presence in the Philippines, albeit most in bad condition or sold in scrap/cheap prices. Parts scarcity and severe electrical/botched wiring problems due to poor conversion practices was the main reason most vanished on Philippine roads.

==== United Kingdom ====
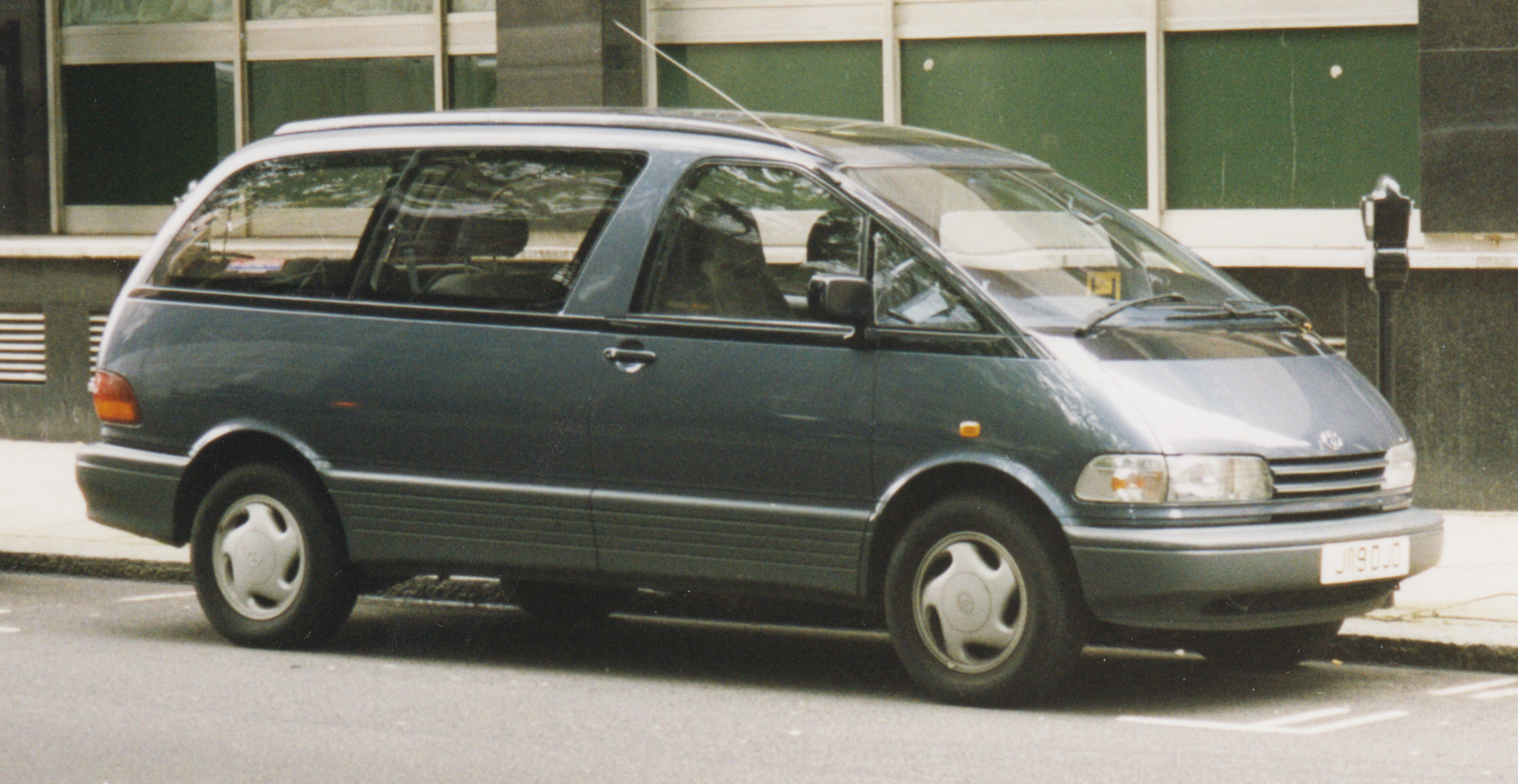
Toyota Previa (UK)

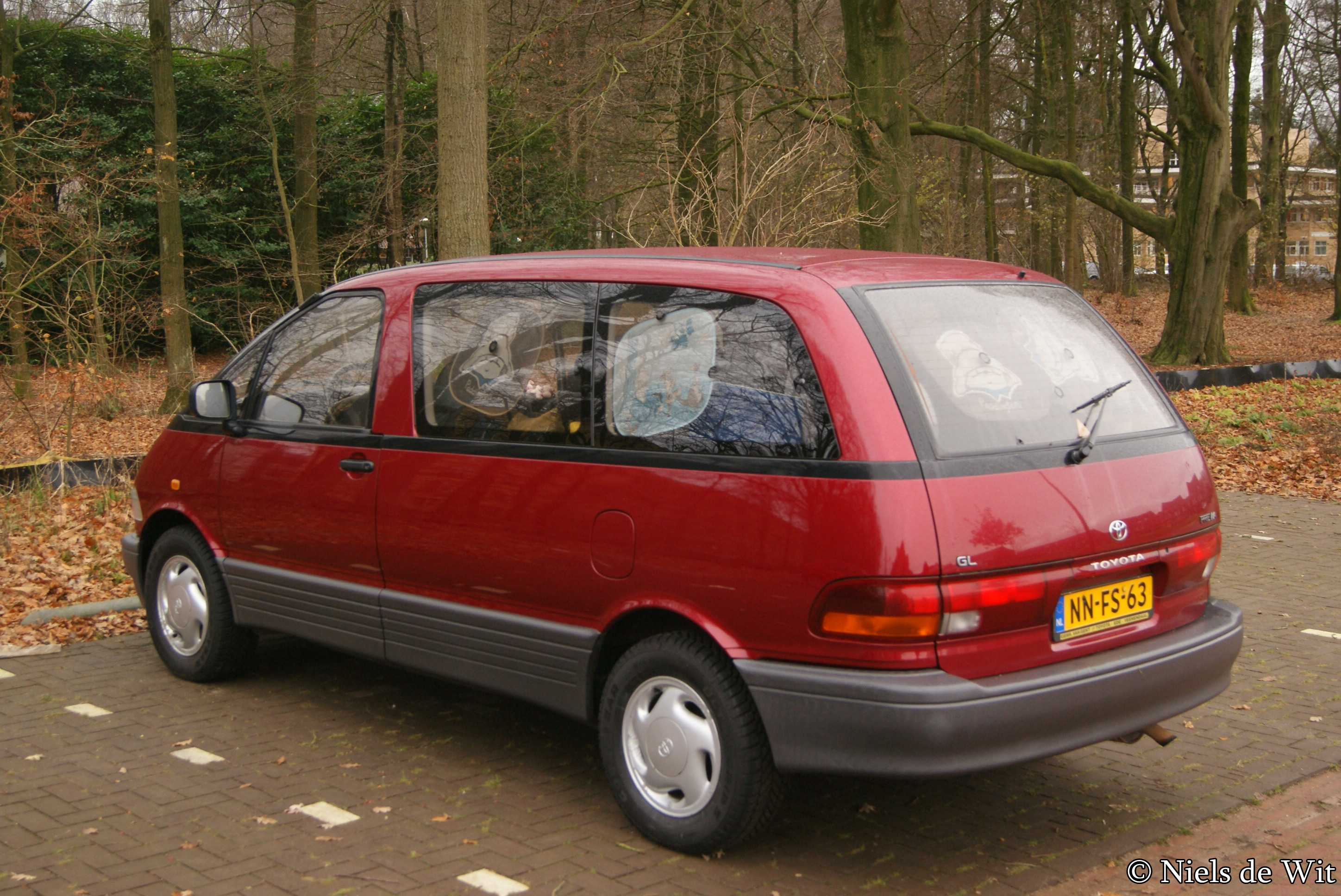
Toyota Previa (Europe)

The first UK market Previas were sold in September 1990, with one trim level called GL with the eight-seat package, followed by the seven-seat uplevel GX (introduced in October 1993) and base GS (introduced in March 1995), retaining the GL as the mid-level model; limited edition models included the Solair I (July 1995, based on GX), Motiv-8 (February 1996, based on GS), Solair II (March 1996, based on GS), and Liber-8 (January 1997, based on GS). No diesel engine Previas were made for the UK market.

==== United States ====
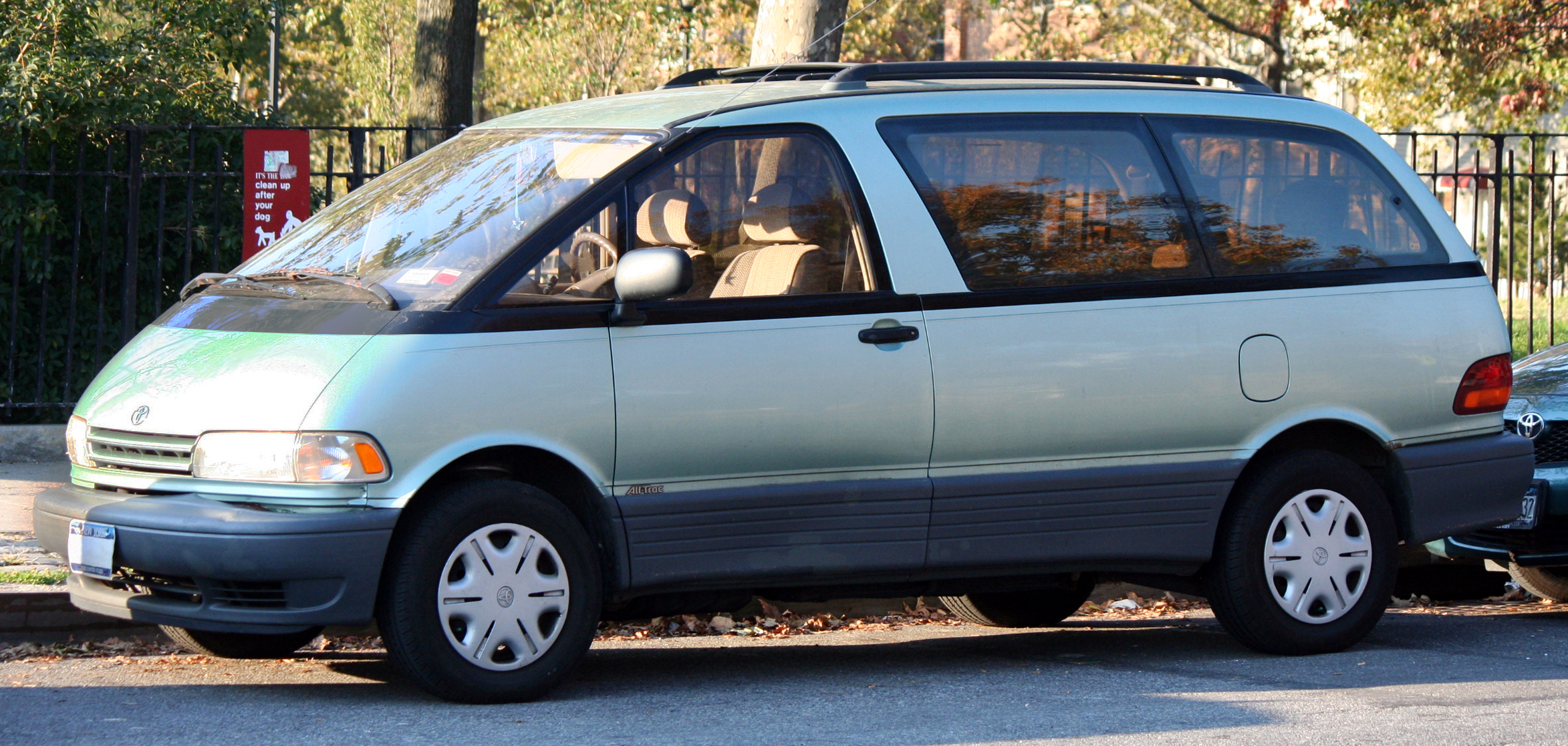
1997 model year Toyota Previa S/C AWD (last model year in the US)

In the United States, the Previa was sold from March 1990 (for the 1991 model year) until 1997. It was imported from Japan to compete with Chrysler Corporation's successful Dodge Caravan minivan, and its twins, the Chrysler Town and Country and Plymouth Voyager. Chrysler CEO Lee Iacocca and other domestic automakers accused Toyota of dumping the Previa, selling at a price claimed to be up to 30.5% below its actual cost in the United States in order to take market share in the minivan segment from Chrysler. While the United States Department of Commerce found the imported minivans were being sold for less than their fair value, the United States International Trade Commission determined there was no material injury to domestic manufacturers.

While the Previa proved more popular than the Toyota Van which it replaced, it did not acquire significant market share from Chrysler—due to its higher price, controversial styling (for its time), lower fuel economy and engine performance—and also due to Chrysler launching redesigned minivans around the same time.

In the United States, the first generation Previa model variations, in order of lowest to highest price/option features, are: DX, DX All-Trac, DX S/C, LE, LE All-Trac, LE S/C, LE S/C All-Trac. DX is also known as "Deluxe". S/C indicates the supercharged engine is fitted, and All-Trac means the vehicle is all-wheel drive.

The mid-engine design precluded the fitment of larger engines, which proved a problem as American drivers were used to having more power; for example, the Dodge/Plymouth/Chrysler models were sold with available V6 engines with slightly more power. Its layout did, however, give the Previa greater interior space than the Chrysler competitors, with 157.8 cu ft (4.47 m^{3}) of cargo capacity, compared to 115.9–139.4 cu ft (3.28–3.95 m^{3}) for the short and long-wheelbase Chrysler minivans.

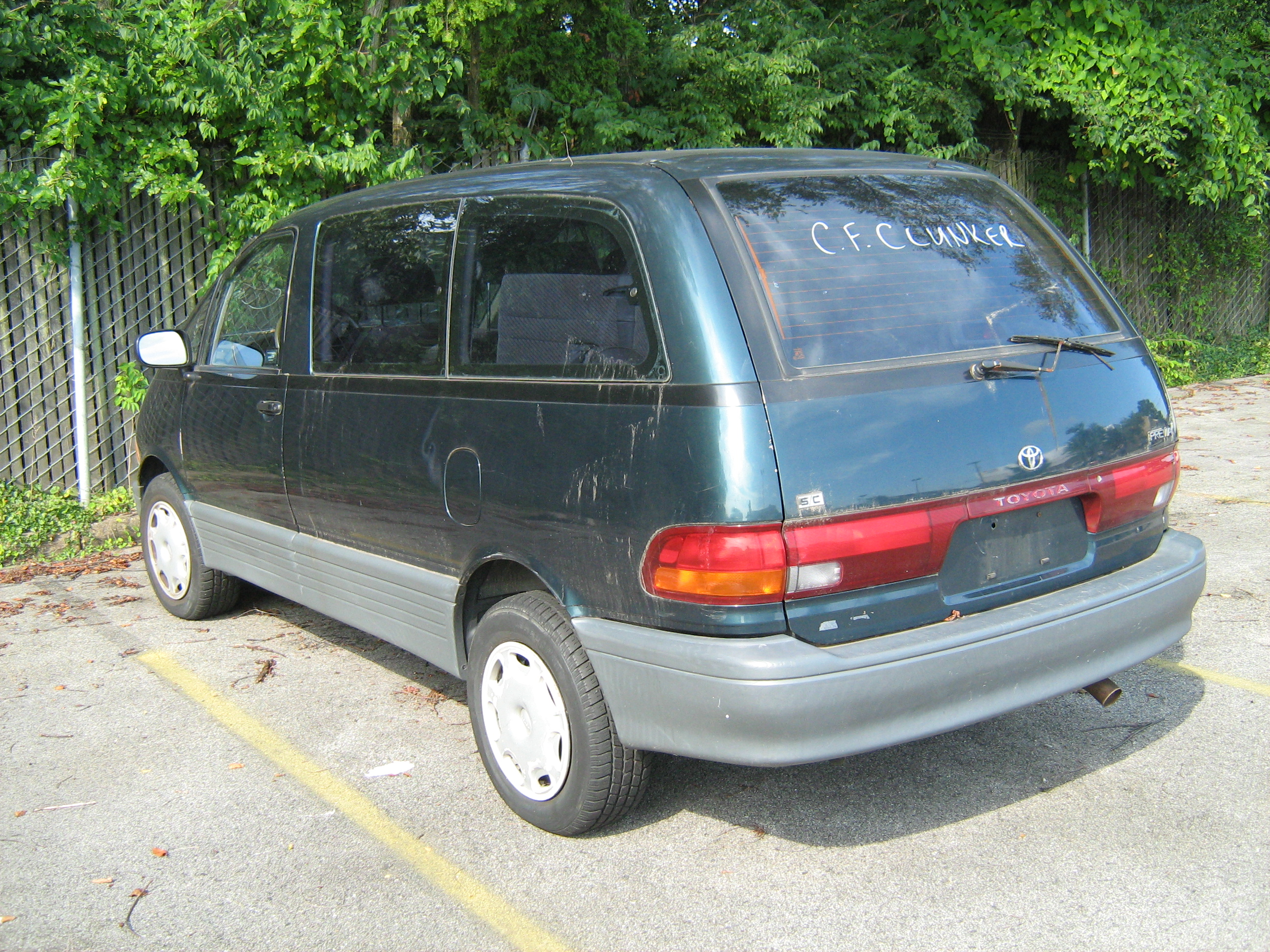
Toyota Previa DX S/C, disabled and marked for the Cash for Clunkers program; showing badges on tailgate

Specific model year changes include:

- MY 1991–1993: North American Previas with the five-speed manual were made from 1990 through to 1993 (model year 1991 to 1993); the manual was discontinued for the 1994 model year, which also is when the supercharged engine was introduced, so no factory-built Previas are equipped with both a manual transmission and supercharged engine.
- MY 1992: Starting in 1991 for model year 1992, North American Previas came with a driver's side airbag and third brake-light. Dual airbags became standard in September 1993 for model year 1994, making it the first minivan to offer a passenger airbag as standard.
- MY 1992–1997: From 1991 to 1997 (for the 1992 to 1997 model years), the optional middle-row individual captain's chairs came with a swivel feature, allowing them to be turned to face the rear of the vehicle; earlier 1990 to 1991 production (1991 model year) also had captain's chairs as an option, but they were fixed and could not swivel.
- MY 1994: Starting with the 1994 model year, Toyota added an option for the 2TZ-FZE engine, which is equipped with a Roots-type supercharger providing 6 psi (41 kPa) of boost, and an air-to-air intercooler, bringing the engine power up to a competitive 158 hp (118 kW) with no penalty to fuel efficiency, which remained at an estimated 19 mpg_{‑US} (12 L/100 km) for combined city/highway driving. Previas equipped with the supercharged engine carry an extra "S/C" badge on the tailgate. The S/C engine option was exclusive to the LE for the 1994 model year, and the option was made available for both DX and LE models for 1995.
- MY 1996: For the 1996 model year, the supercharged 2TZ-FZE became the standard engine.

The United States version of the Previa was discontinued after the 1997 model year, replaced by the more traditionally designed, front-wheel drive, US-designed and built, Camry-based Sienna.

== Second generation (XR30/XR40; 2000) ==
Second generation
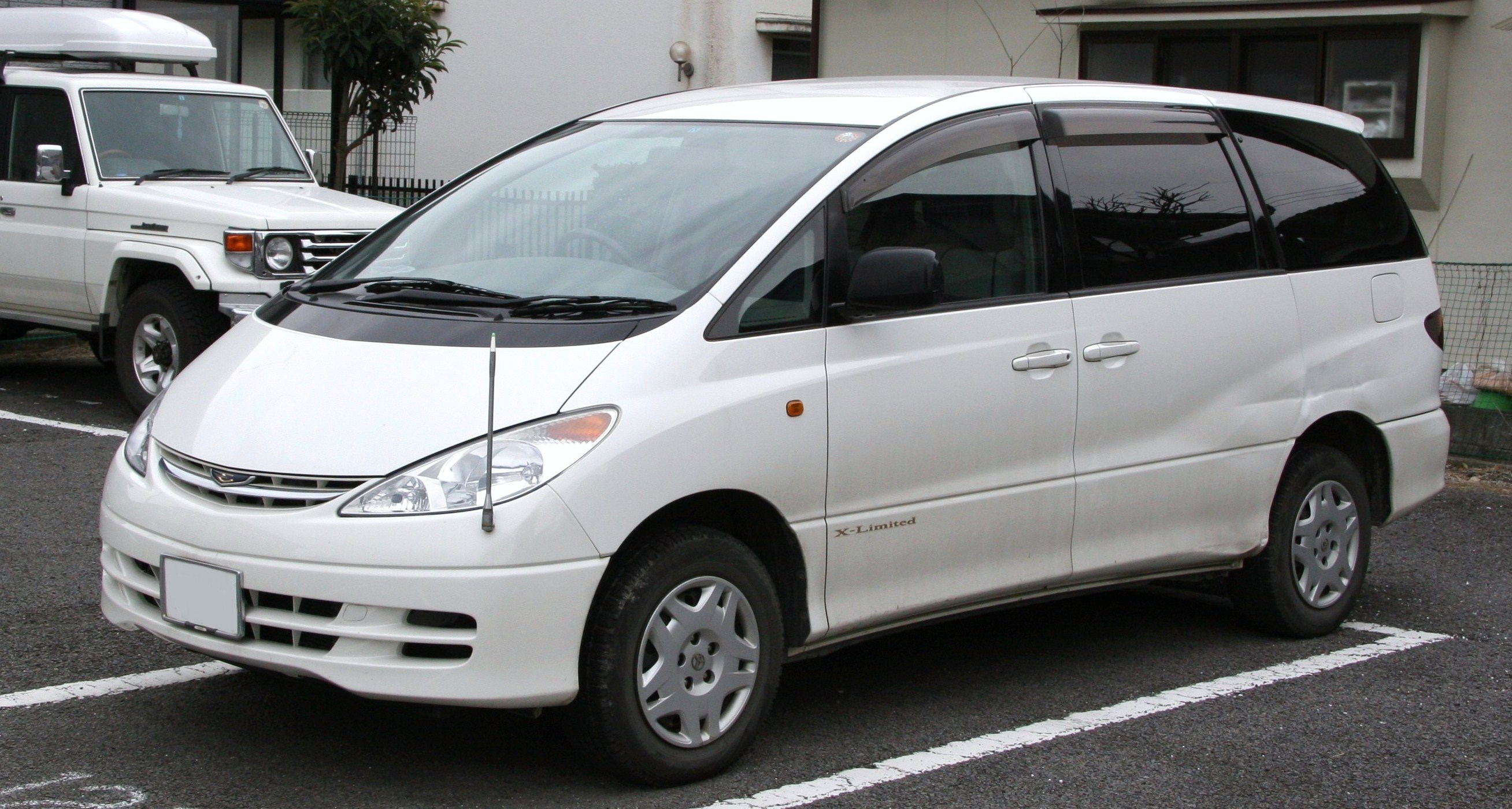
- Pre-facelift Estima L X-Limited

Overview
- Model code: XR30; XR40
- Also called: Toyota Estima (Japan); Toyota Tarago (Australia)
- Production: January 2000 – December 2005
- Assembly: Japan: Kariya, Aichi (Fujimatsu plant); Toyota, Aichi (Motomachi plant)
- Designer: Hiroshi Okamoto (1997)

Body and chassis
- Layout: Front-engine, front-wheel-drive; Front-engine, four-wheel-drive
- Platform: Toyota K platform
- Related: Toyota Alphard (AH10); Toyota Sienna (XL20)

Powertrain
- Engine: Petrol: 2.4 L 2AZ-FE I4; 3.0 L 1MZ-FE V6; Diesel: 2.0 L 1CD-FTV turbo I4; Petrol hybrid: 2.4 L 2AZ-FXE I4
- Electric motor: Synchronous motor (hybrid): 1EM 13 kW (17 hp; 18 PS) (front); 1FM 18 kW (24 hp; 24 PS) (rear)
- Transmission: 5-speed manual; 4-speed automatic; CVT (hybrid)
- Battery: 1.4 kWh nickel–metal hydride

Dimensions
- Wheelbase: 2,900 mm (114.2 in)
- Length: 4,750 mm (187.0 in)
- Width: 1,790 mm (70.5 in)
- Height: 1,770 mm (69.7 in)
- Curb weight: 1,640–1,850 kg (3,616–4,079 lb)

The first generation Previa was sold outside the United States until 8 January 2000, when a newer front-wheel drive second generation replaced it. The second generation was not available in North America, as they received the Toyota Sienna. The second generation Previa had a slightly longer wheelbase (2900 mm) and was both narrower (1790 mm) and lower (1770 mm) than the first one; it switched to FF layout and was based on the Camry platform. The Previa/Estima received a facelift in July 2003, including redesigned, somewhat slimmer headlamps.

It was produced with sliding rear passenger doors on both sides and offered space for up to six, seven or eight passengers and, as with the first generation, was sold as the Estima in Japan and as the Tarago in Australia. The range available in Australia was the GLi, GLX and Ultima.

Models sold on the European markets were available with both gasoline and diesel-powered four-cylinder engines. The diesel engine was a 2.0-liter 1CD-FTV with 85 kW (116 PS) and the gasoline-powered one a 2.4-liter 2AZ-FE with 115 kW (156 PS). Both models featured a five-speed manual transmission as the part of standard equipment, while a four-speed automatic was available as an option on gasoline-powered model.

Australian models (known locally as ACR30R) were only available with the 2.4-liter petrol engine and a four-speed automatic.

In the UK, GS, GLS and CDX trim levels were available. When the facelift was introduced in June 2003, these became T2, T3 and T Spirit respectively.

In Japan, a 3.0-liter V6 engine and a 2.4-liter hybrid version of the Estima were available. For the first generation, the Estima was split into two lines with slight visual differences (the Emina and the Lucida), depending on the dealership chain. For this generation, the difference was limited to a differently colored front badge and rear turn signal lights; Toyota Stores sold it as the Estima T while Toyota Corolla Store dealerships sold it as the Estima L. After the facelift, only the different emblems remained to distinguish the two. Toyota also offered the Estima Aeras subvariant, with an aerodynamic bodykit including diverse wings and spoilers.

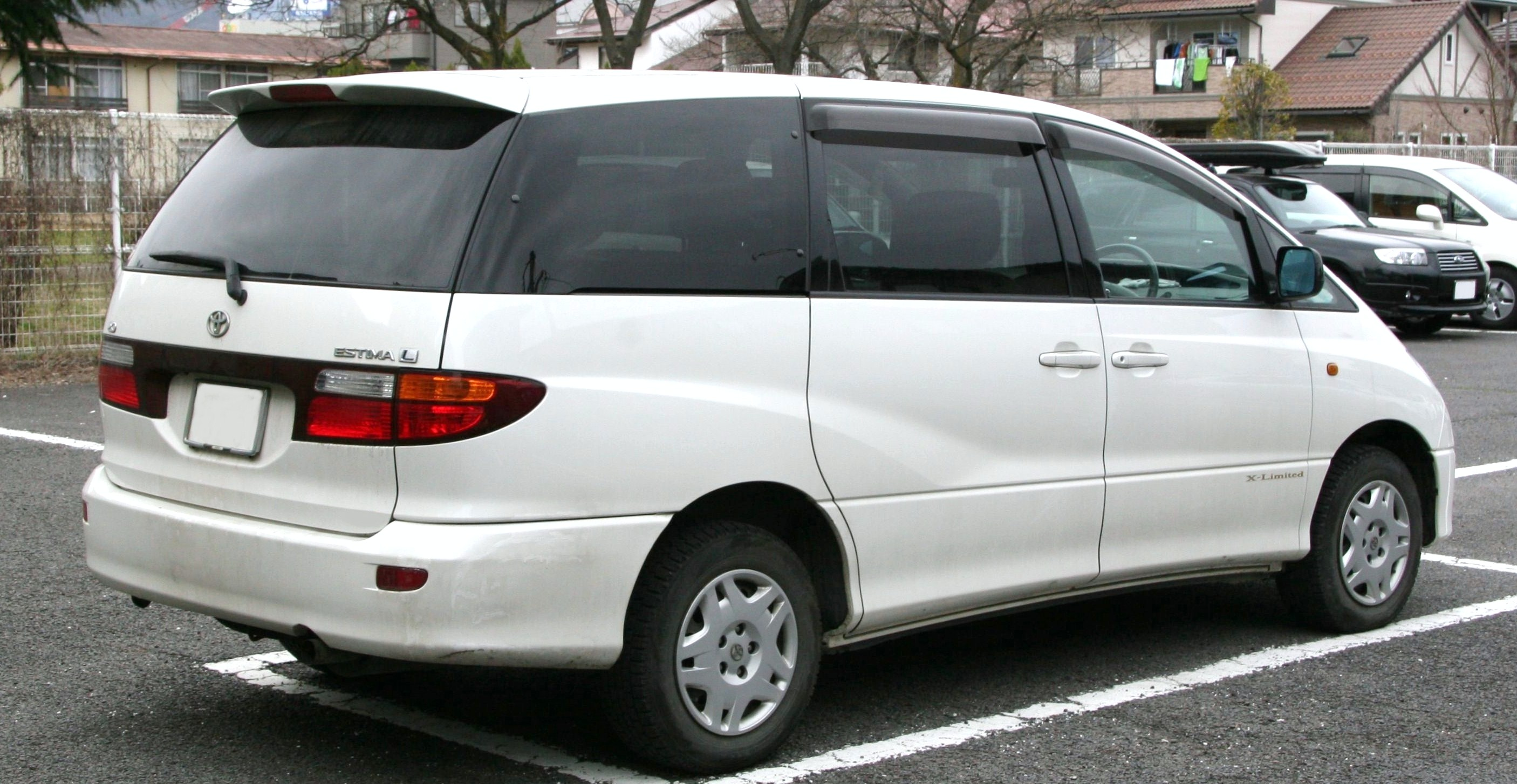
Pre-facelift Estima L X-Limited (Japan)

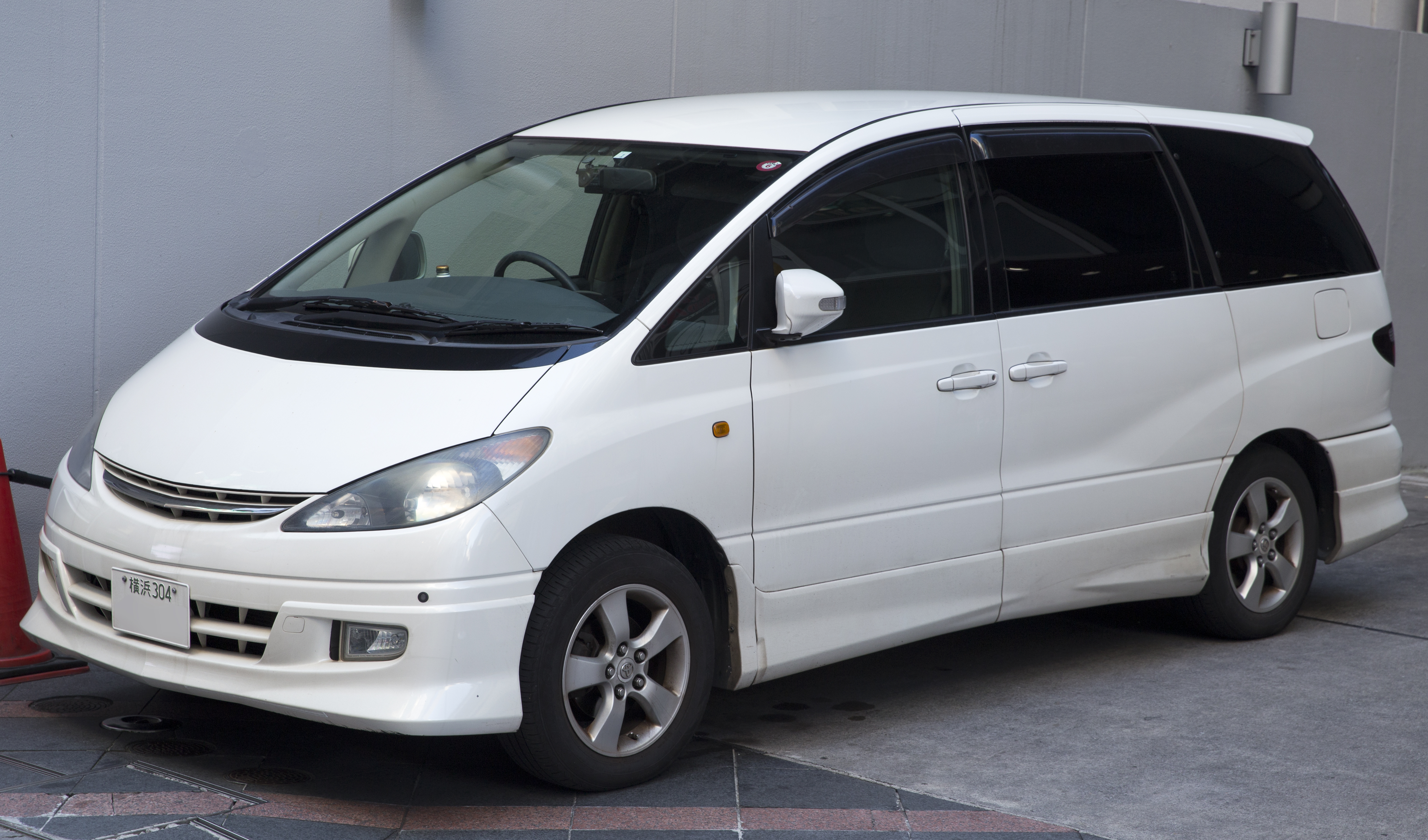
Pre-facelift Estima Aeras (Japan)

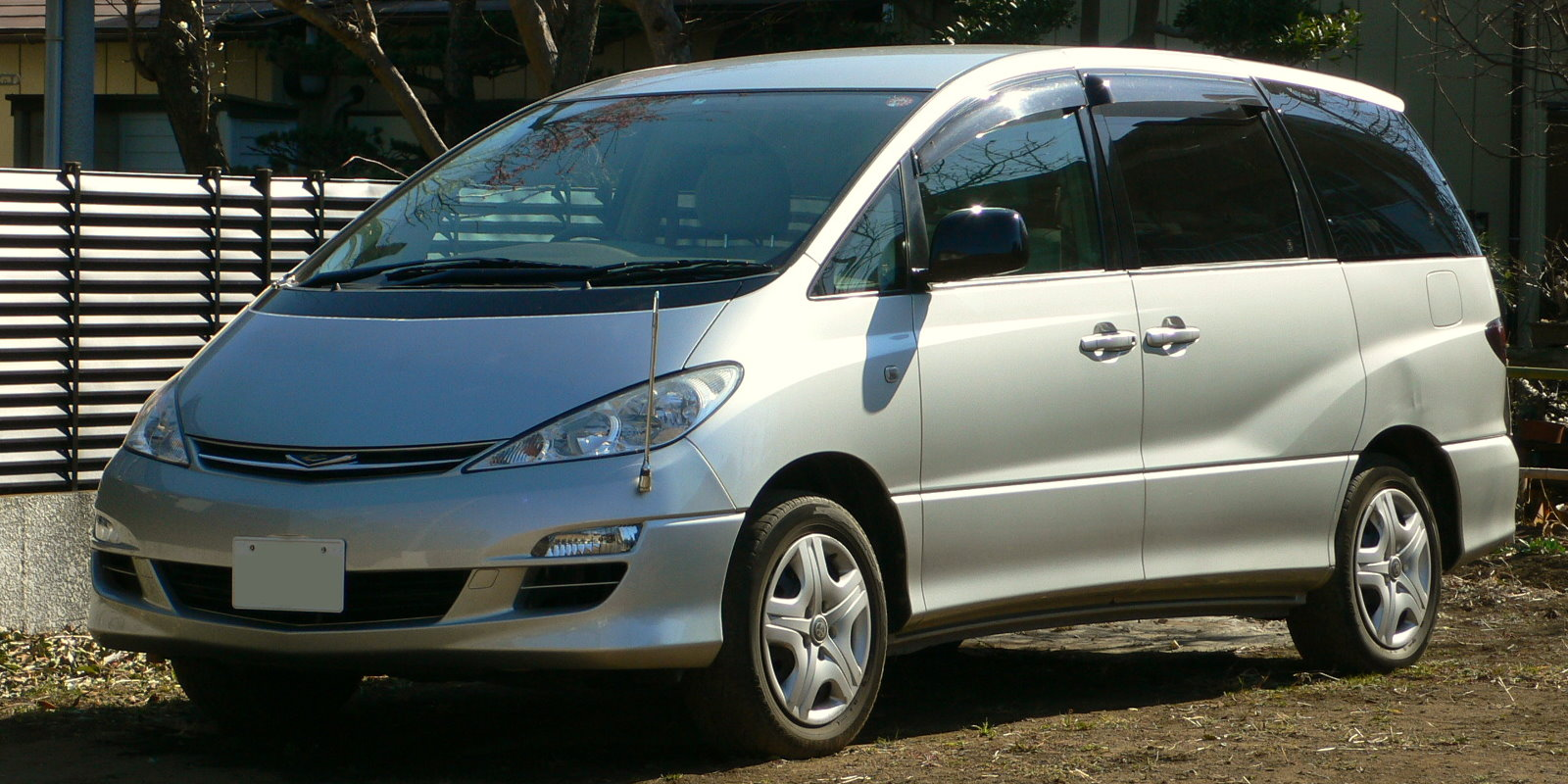
Facelift Estima (Japan)

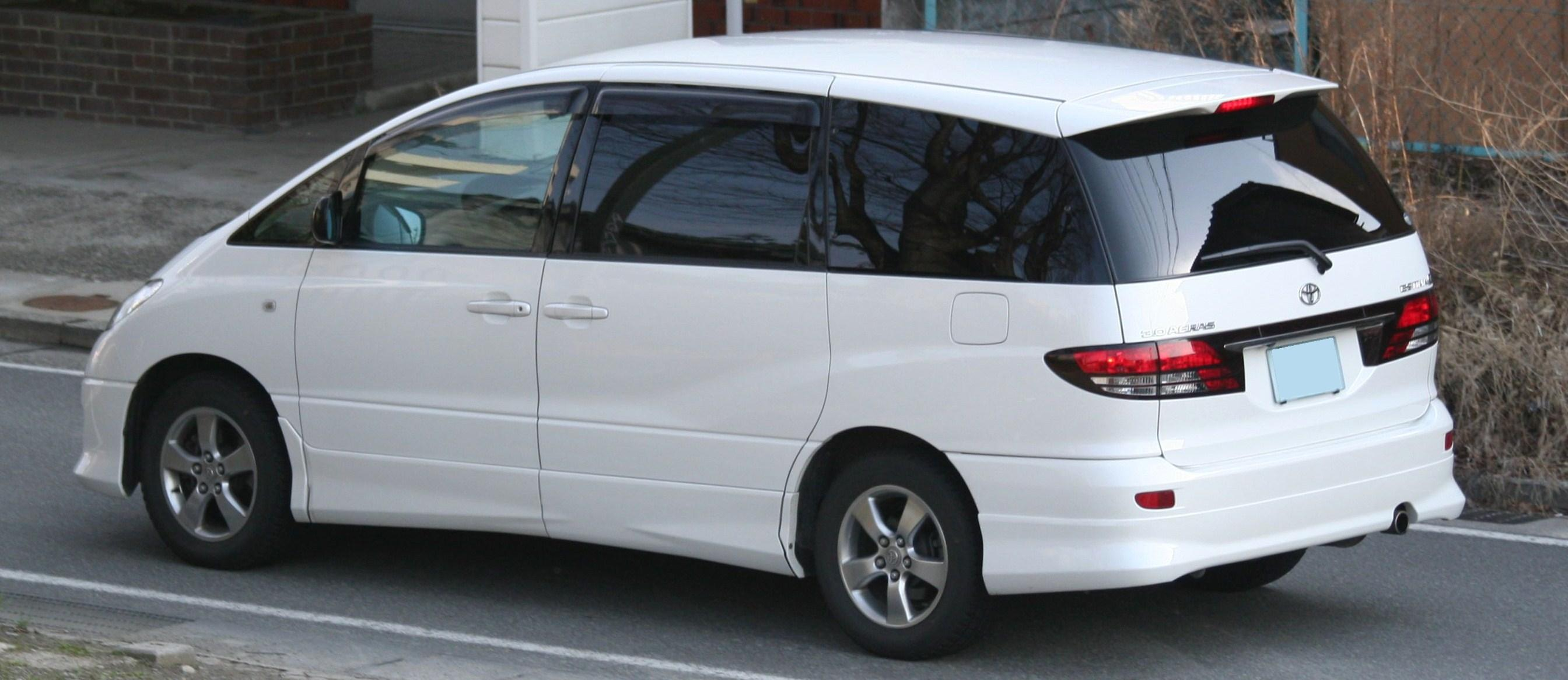
Facelift Estima (Japan)

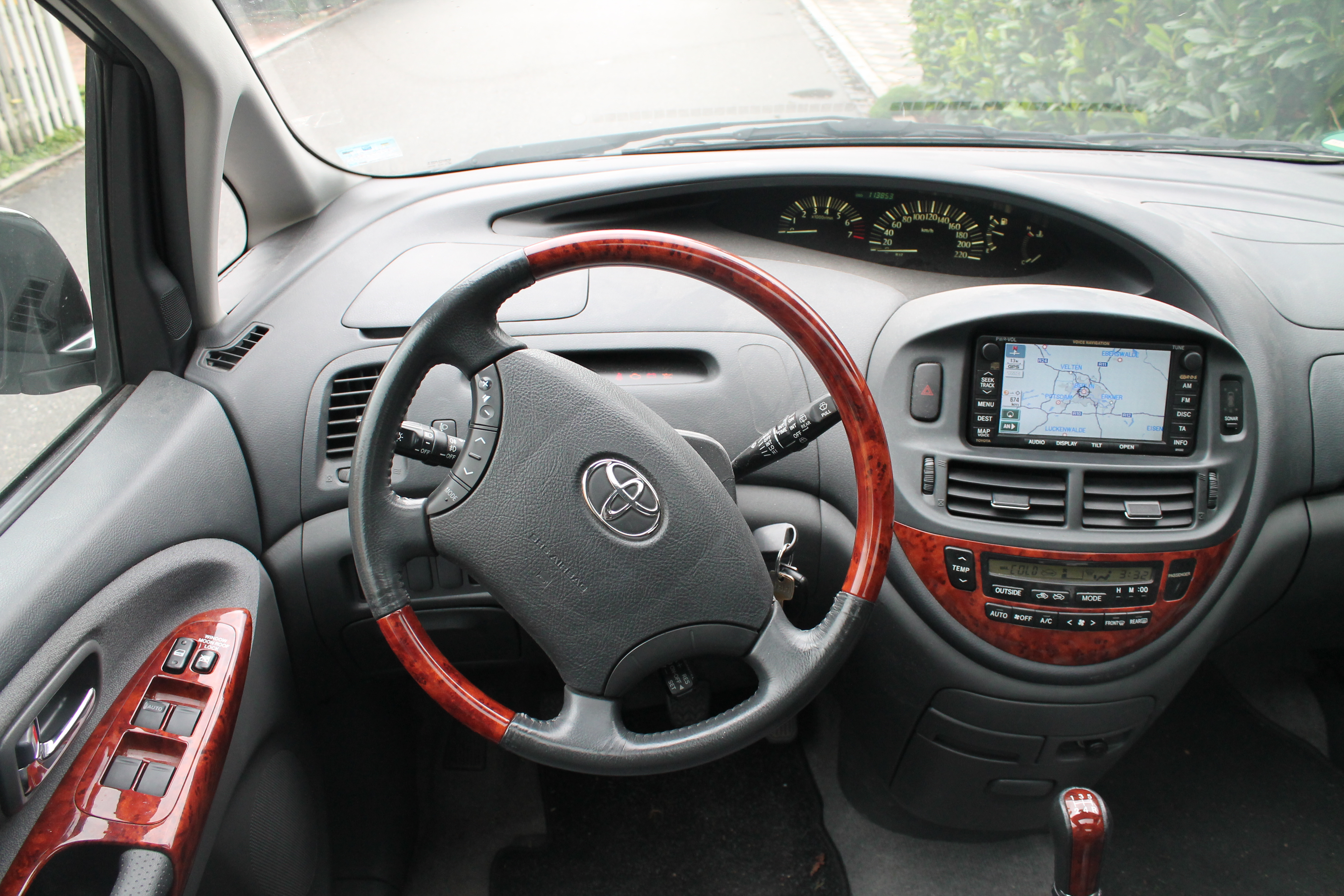
Interior

=== Estima Hybrid ===
The Estima Hybrid employed the Toyota Hybrid Synergy Drive and used two electric motors. A 2.4-liter gasoline engine and a 13 kW (17 hp) electric motor power the front wheels, while the rear wheels are propelled by a 18 kW (24 hp) electric motor. The vehicle had been on sale in Japan since June 2001. Production of the hybrid started in May 2001 at the Motomachi plant and June 2002 at the Fujimatsu plant. It is claimed by Toyota to be the world's first hybrid minivan.

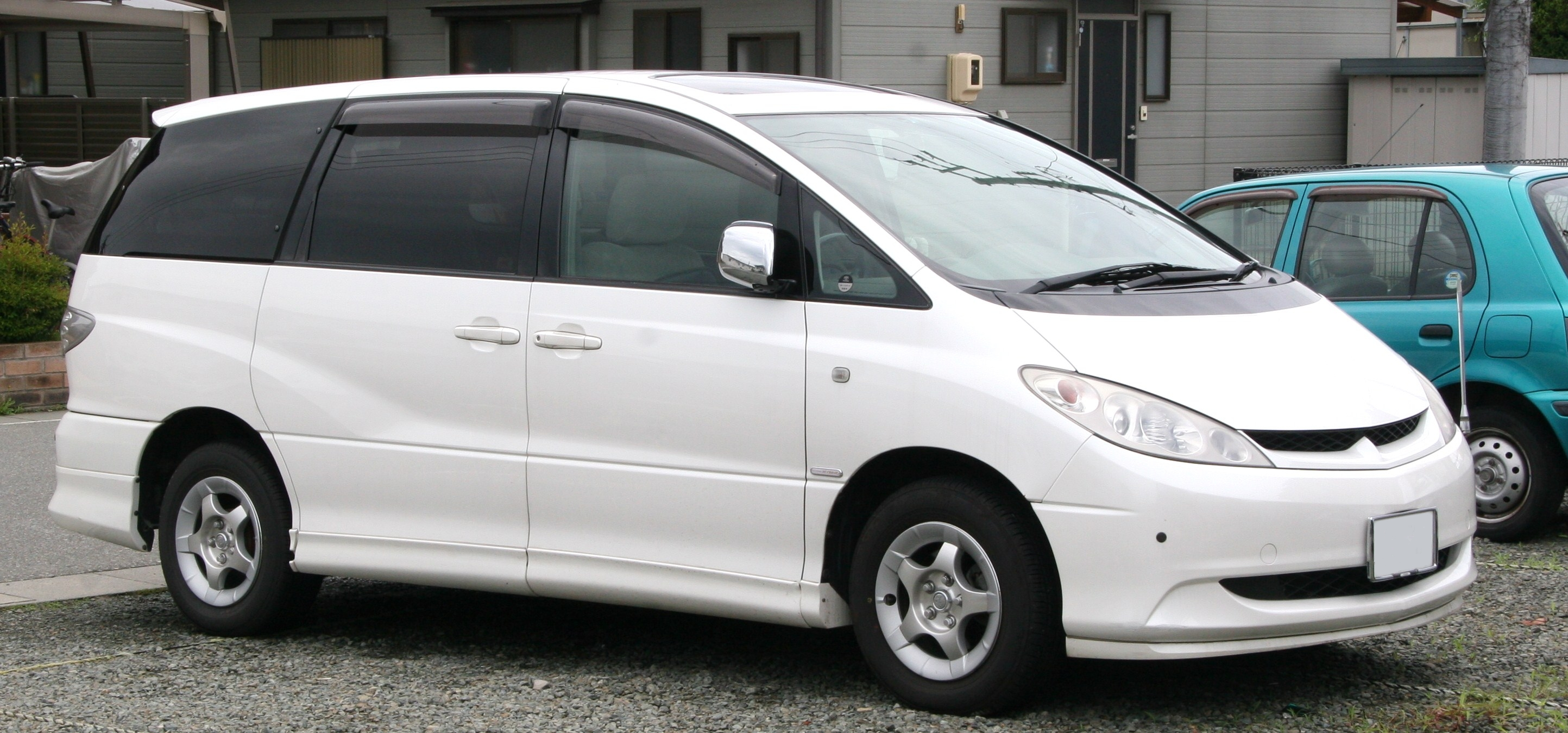
2001–2003 Toyota Estima Hybrid

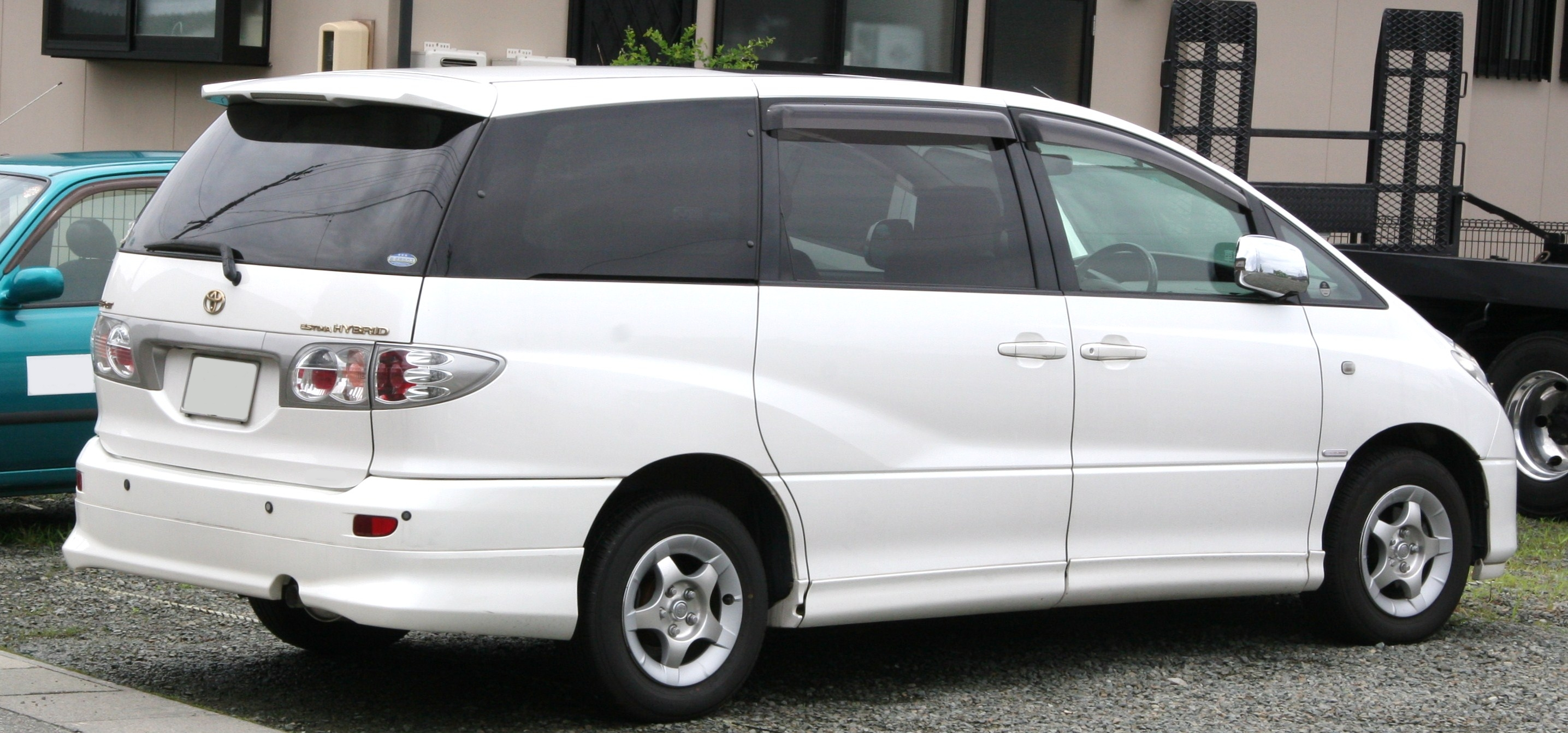
2001–2003 Toyota Estima Hybrid

== Third generation (XR50; 2006) ==
Third generation
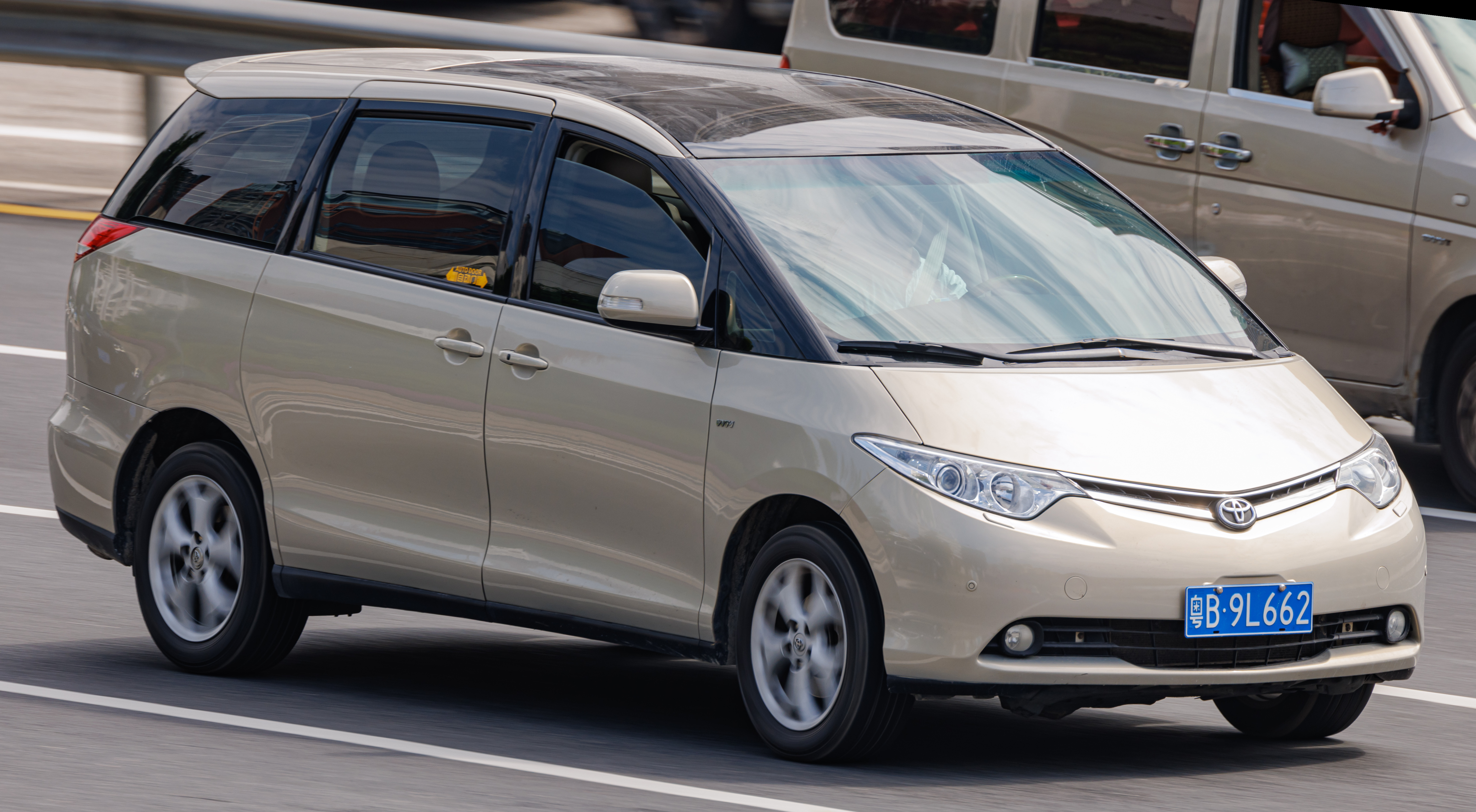
- Pre-facelift Toyota Previa (China)

Overview
- Model code: XR50
- Also called: Toyota Estima (Japan); Toyota Tarago (Australia)
- Production: January 2006 – October 2019
- Assembly: Japan: Kariya, Aichi (Fujimatsu plant); Toyota, Aichi (Motomachi plant)
- Designer: Kuniaki Toyooka

Body and chassis
- Layout: Front-engine, front-wheel-drive; Front-engine, four-wheel-drive
- Platform: Toyota New MC platform
- Related: Toyota Alphard (AH20)

Powertrain
- Engine: Petrol: 2.4 L 2AZ-FE I4; 3.5 L 2GR-FE V6; Petrol hybrid: 2.4 L 2AZ-FXE I4
- Transmission: 4-speed automatic (2.4, 2006–2010); 7-speed Super CVT-i (2.4); 6-speed automatic (3.5); e-CVT (hybrid)

Dimensions
- Wheelbase: 2,950 mm (116.1 in)
- Length: 4,795 mm (188.8 in) (2006–2015); 4,820 mm (189.8 in) (2016–2019)
- Width: 1,800 mm (70.9 in); 1,820 mm (71.7 in) (2016–2019)
- Height: 1,750 mm (68.9 in)
- Curb weight: 1,725–1,915 kg (3,803–4,222 lb)

The third-generation model was introduced in 2006 in Japanese and Australian markets as the Estima and Tarago respectively, and as the Previa in other markets. This generation was notably absent from the European market.

Features include an available second generation Hybrid Synergy Drive drivetrain (only in the Japanese market), automatic parallel and reverse parking (only on Toyota Estima), Lane-Keep Assist (LKA) system which detects the lane markers on the road and steers the car on the right direction (for Estima only), Adaptive Front-Lighting System low beam headlamps which assists to light up the upcoming road around a bend, track-mounted second row reclining seats with footrests, and power-folding split third row seats (for seven-seater models). It received a minor facelift in 2009. G-BOOK was added to the list of optional features. Active driver assist features such as Lane Keeping Assist and Dynamic Radar Cruise Control were offered as an option exclusively to V6 variants.

In some markets such as Hong Kong and Taiwan, Toyota announced the 3.5-liter V6 model in January 2007, but was dropped from the lineup after its major facelift in 2016.

In the Philippines, the XR50 replaced the XR40 Previa in 2009. It only comes in the 2.4L Q variant. It is powered by Toyota's 2.4L 2AZ-FE inline-four engine with VVT-i paired to a 4-speed automatic transmission. It came with power sliding doors, automatic climate control, faux wood trim, 2DIN 6 CD audio system, speakers, remote keyless entry, and leather seats among other features.

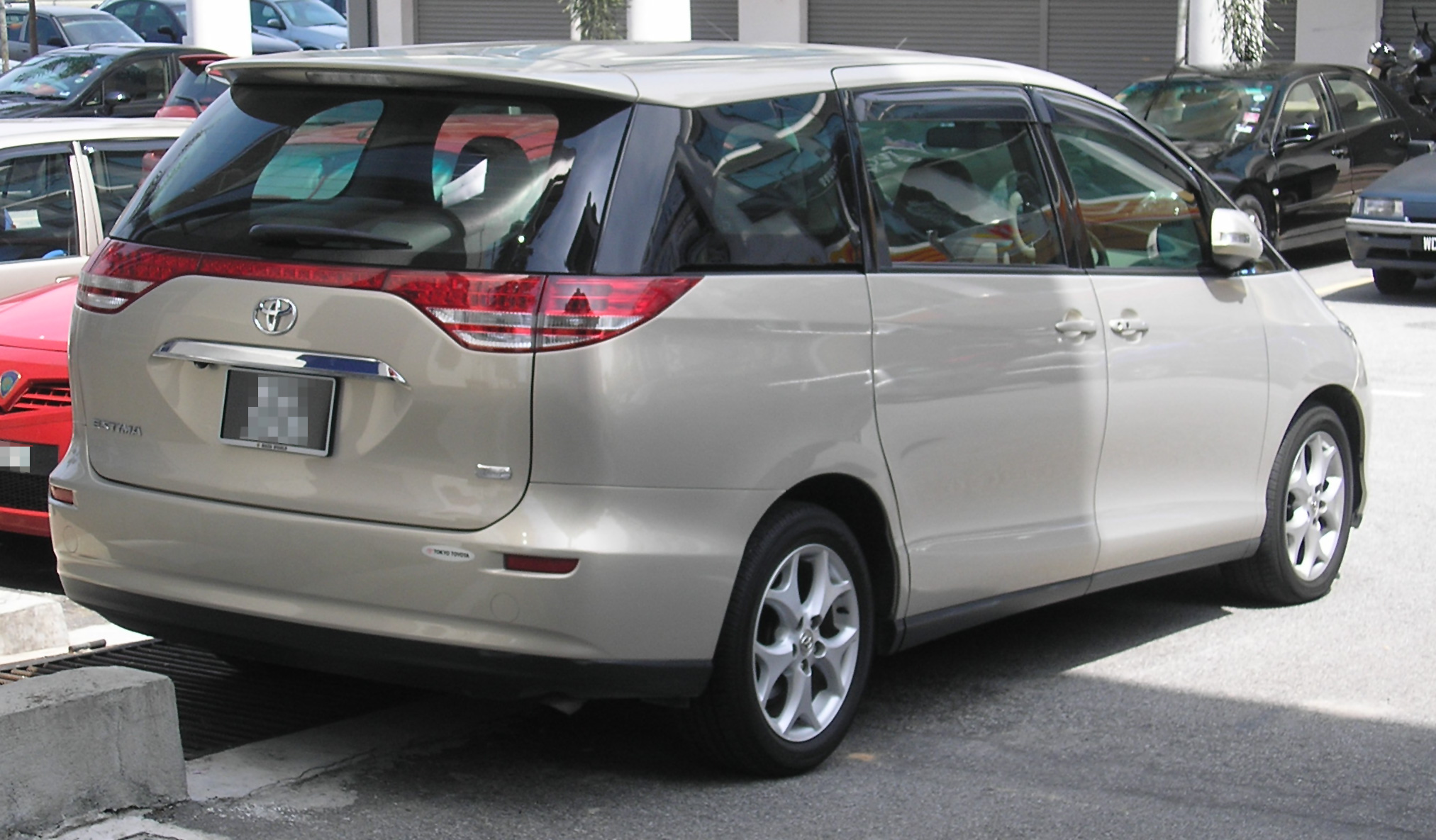
Estima, rear view (pre-facelift)

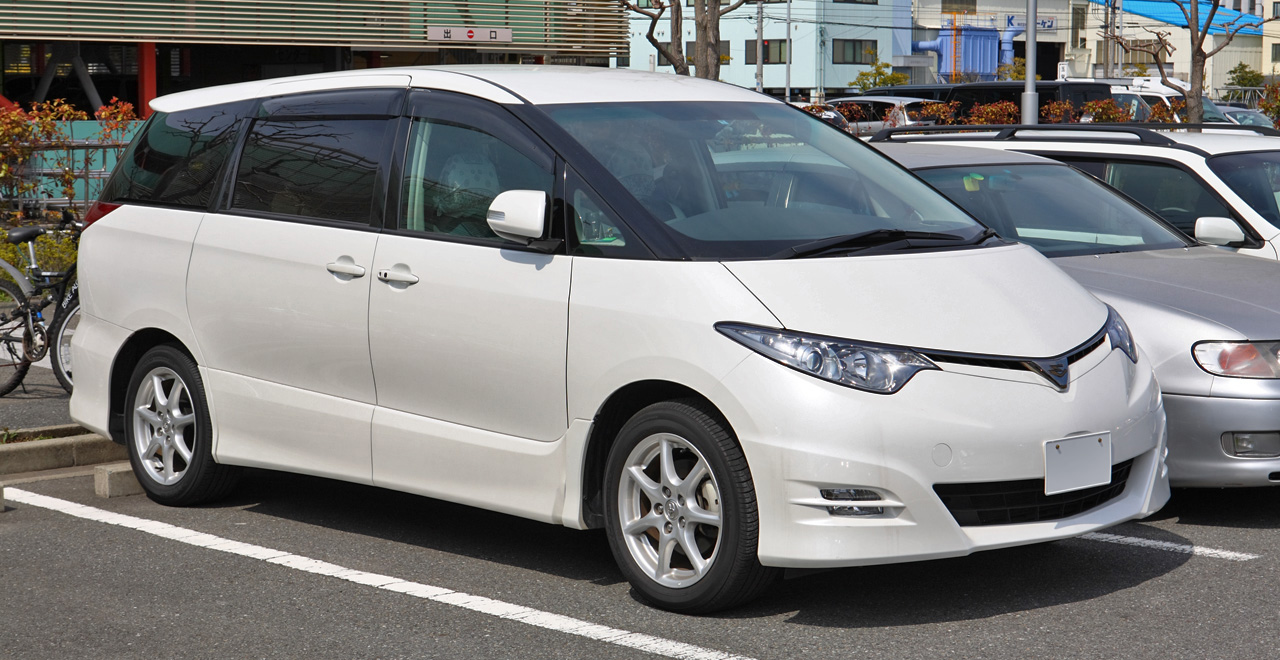
2006 Toyota Estima Aeras (Japan)

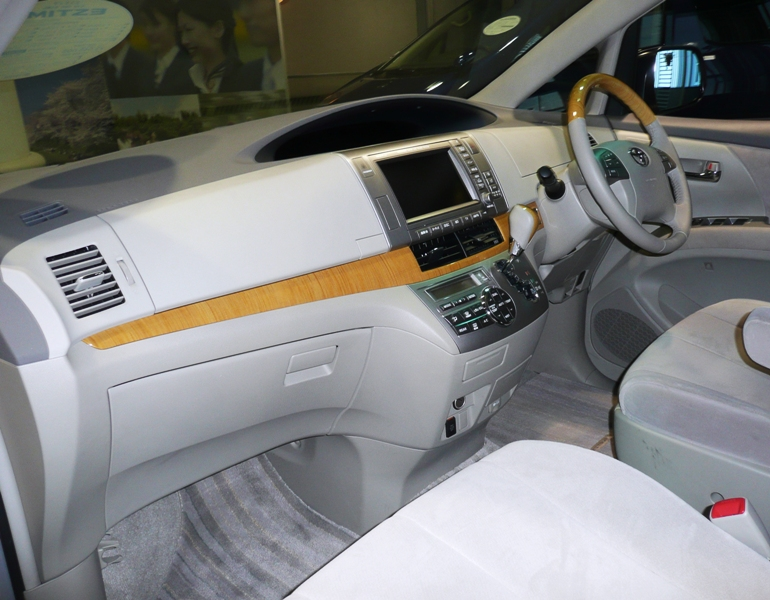
Interior (pre-facelift)

=== Estima Hybrid ===
The third generation Estima Hybrid is powered by Toyota's 2.4-liter E-Four hybrid system with all-wheel drive. The hybridized Estima bears the model code AHR20 and is specifically marketed and sold exclusively in China and Japan, with limited importation to Australia. It is said to be similar to that of the Lexus RX 400h, but a generation behind.

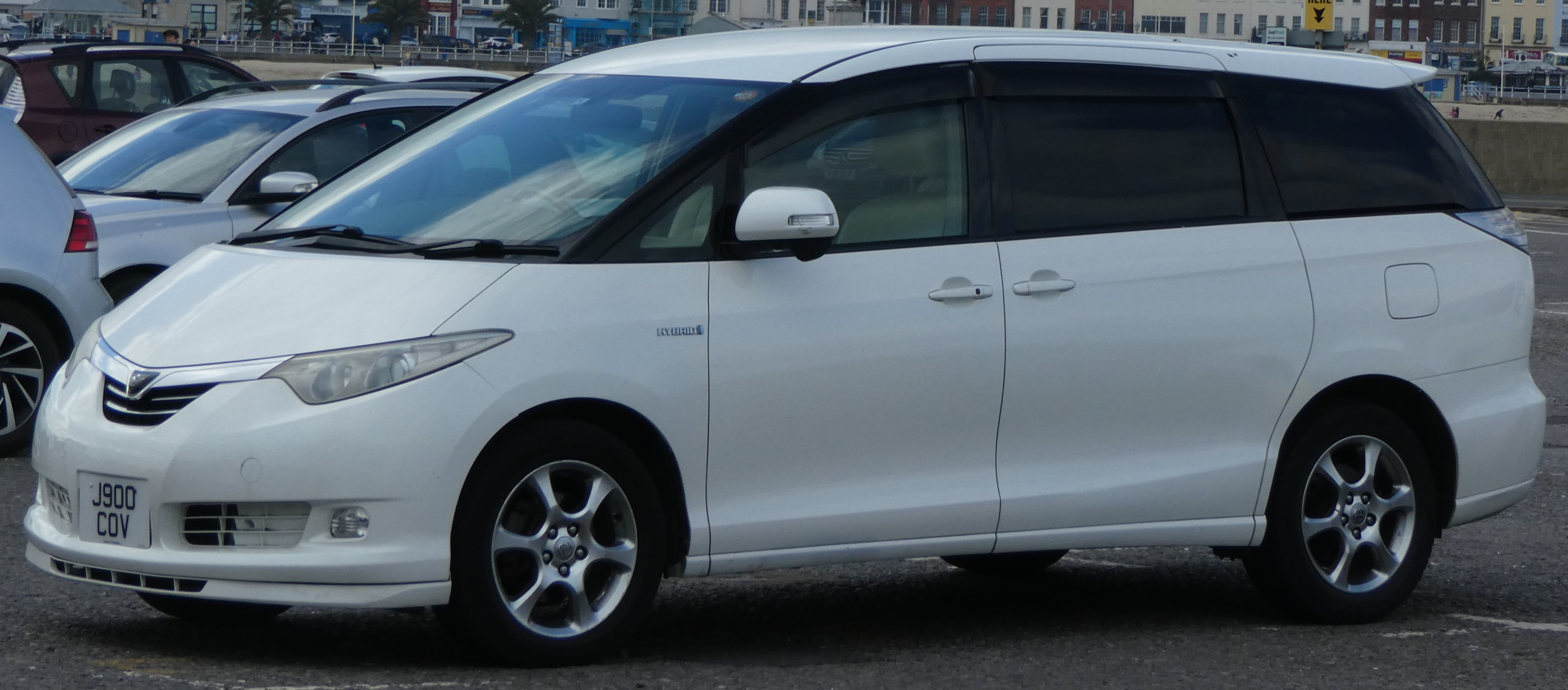
2006 Toyota Estima Hybrid (pre-facelift)

=== 2008 Facelift ===
The first facelift of the model was launched in December 2008, redesigned to provide more visual distinction between the Estima and the Estima Hybrid. This included a revised front fascia with a new radiator grille with chrome elements and a redesigned front bumper. The headlamps were updated to a design that pointed downward, contrasting with the previous upward curve towards the center of the grille. Advanced HID headlights with an Adaptive Front-Lighting System (AFS) were introduced, improving night-time visibility by aligning the low-beam headlights with the car’s steering. The rear received a redesigned garnish and combination LED lamps. Inside, the seven-seater Previa offered an eight-way power driver seat, dual armrests, and a leather package on the top grades. The center panel was adorned with wood trim, and the Optitron meter gauge was modified for a more contemporary look. Safety was improved with the integration of an active Whiplash Injury Lessening (WIL) System into the headrests of the driver and front passenger seats.

In December 2009, both the 2.4 and the 3.5 engine were revised and now produced only 75% of the emissions allowed under the 2005 standards; the HDD navigation system was also updated.

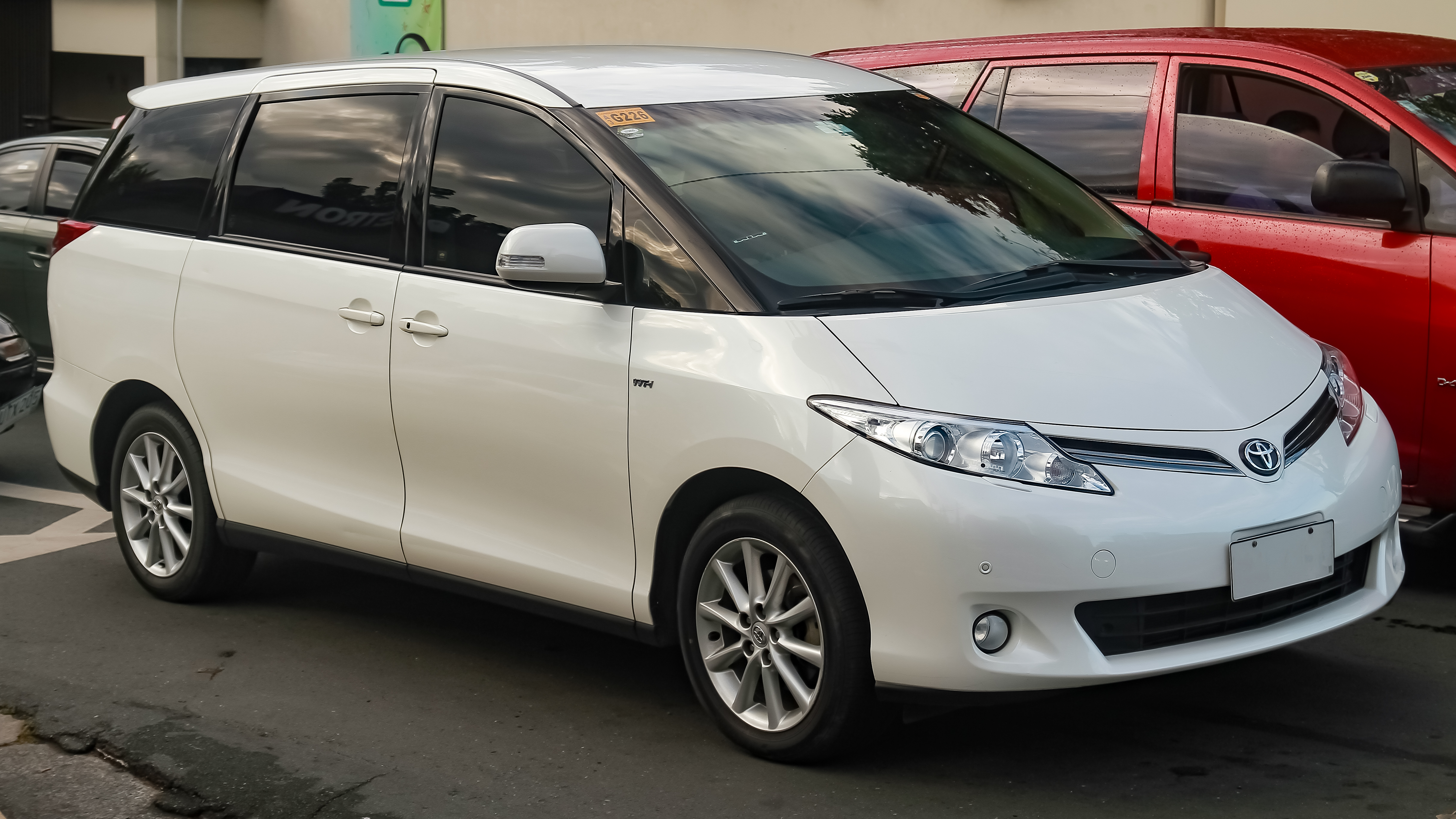
2008 facelift Toyota Previa

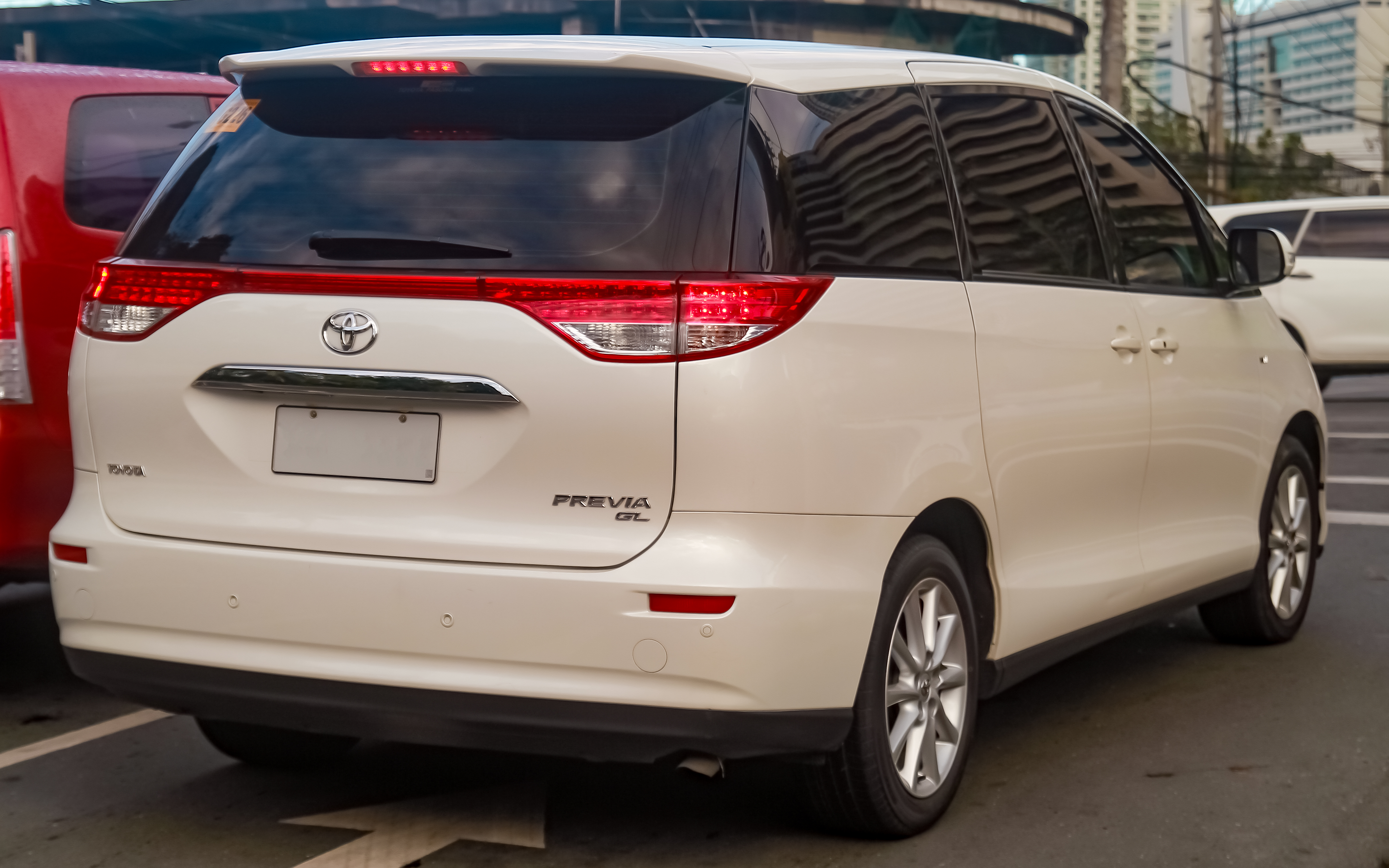
Rear view (facelift)

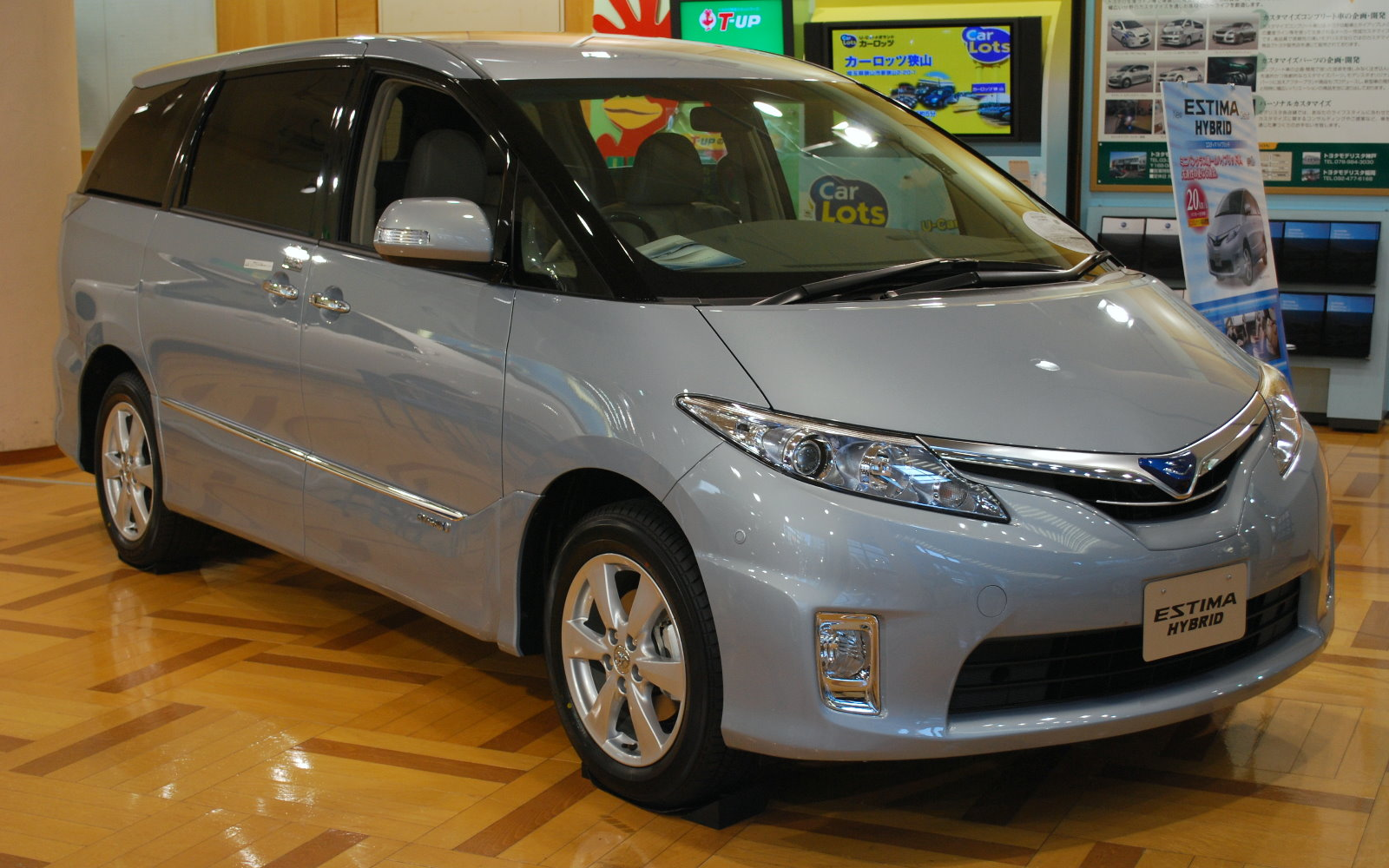
Toyota Estima Hybrid (2008 facelift)

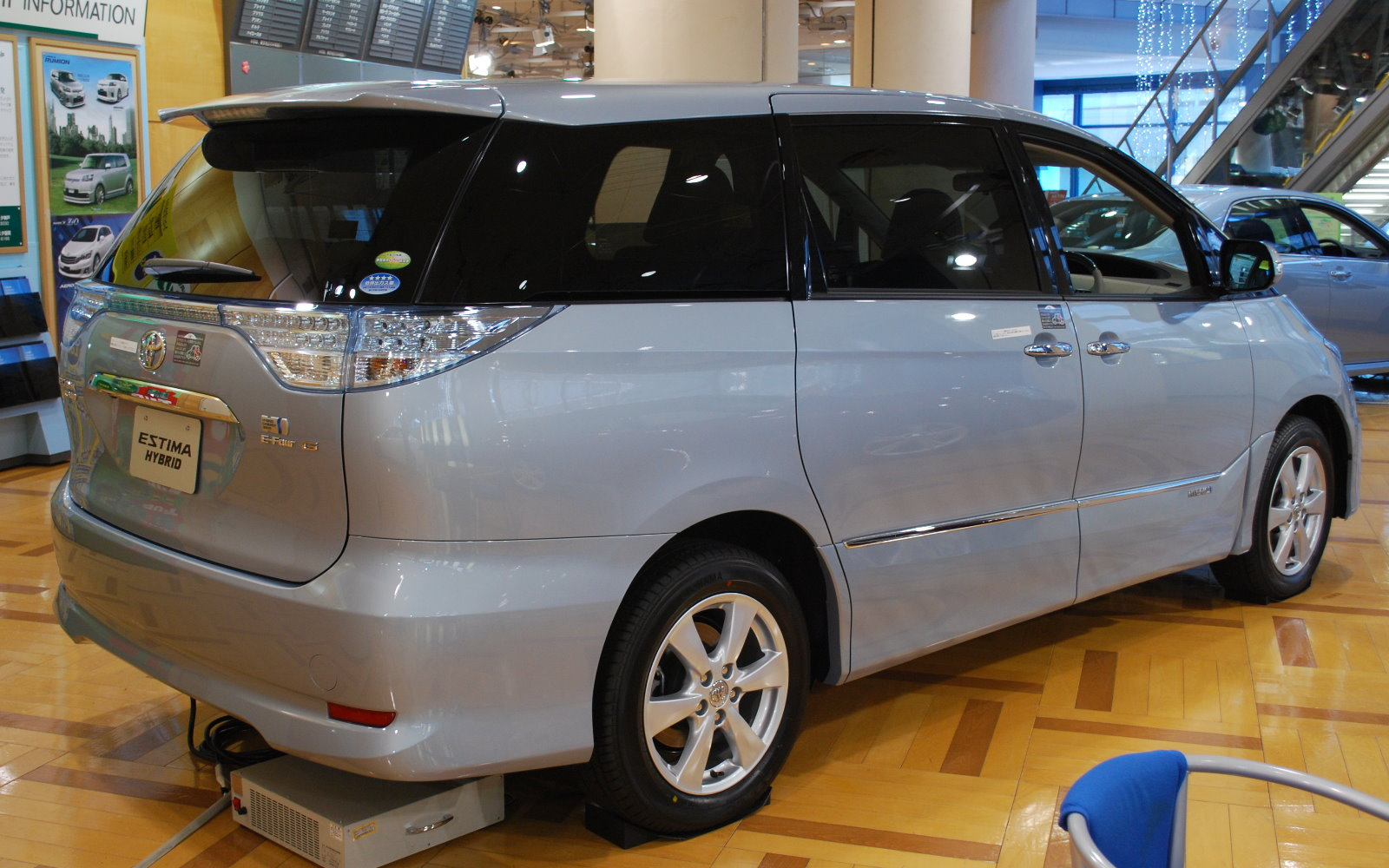
Rear view (facelift)

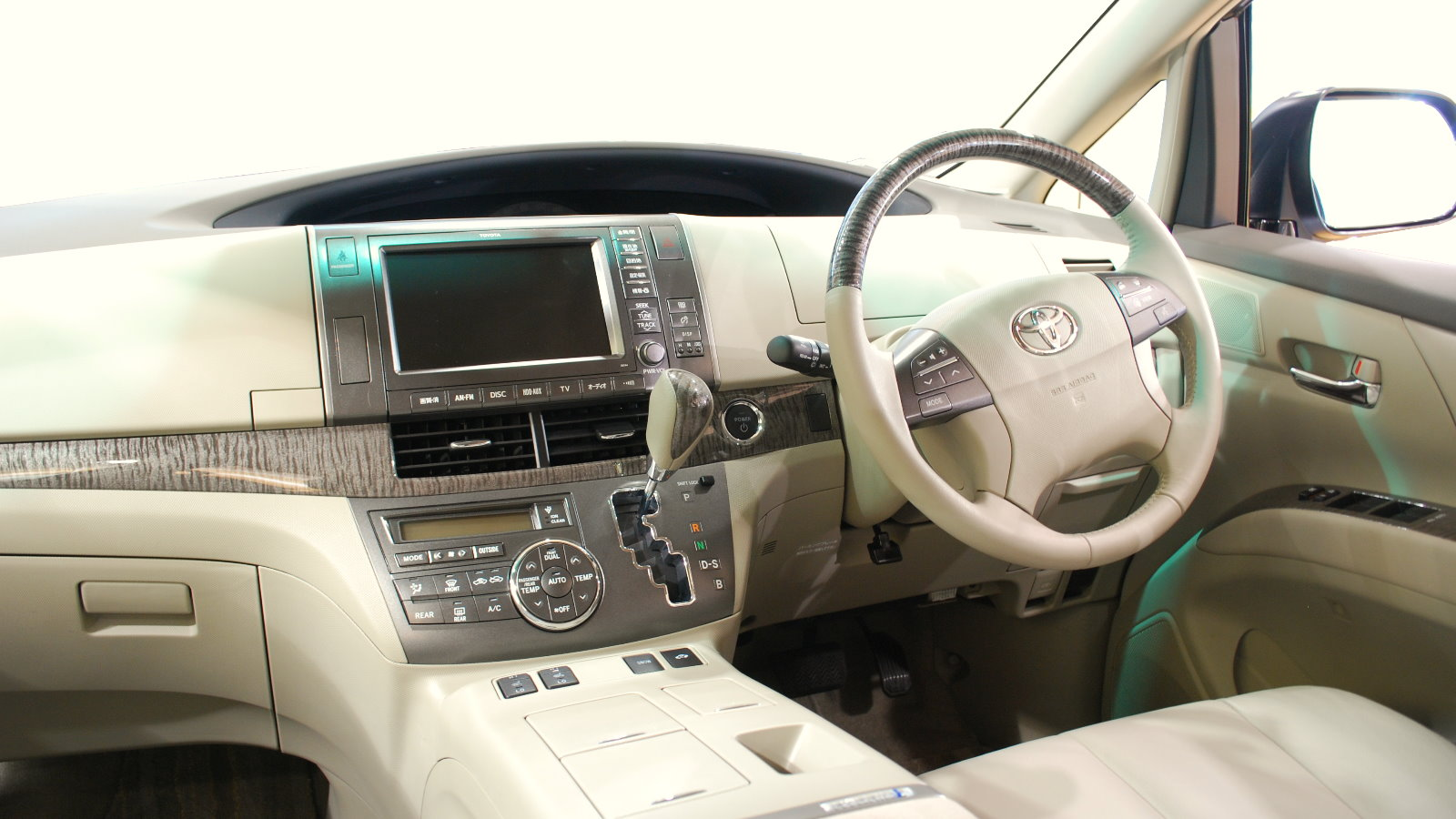
2008 interior (Estima Hybrid; facelift)

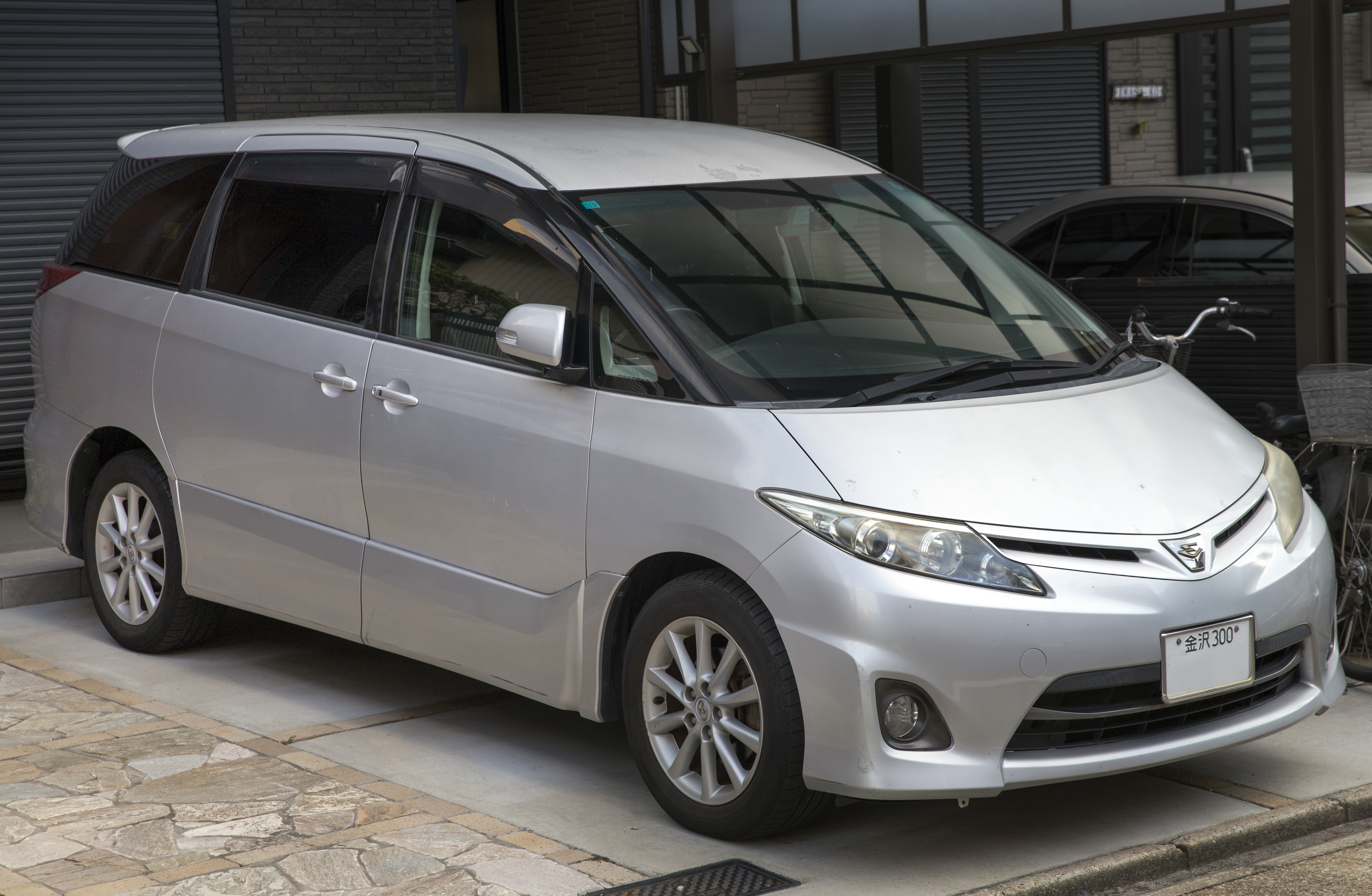
Estima Aeras (2008 facelift)

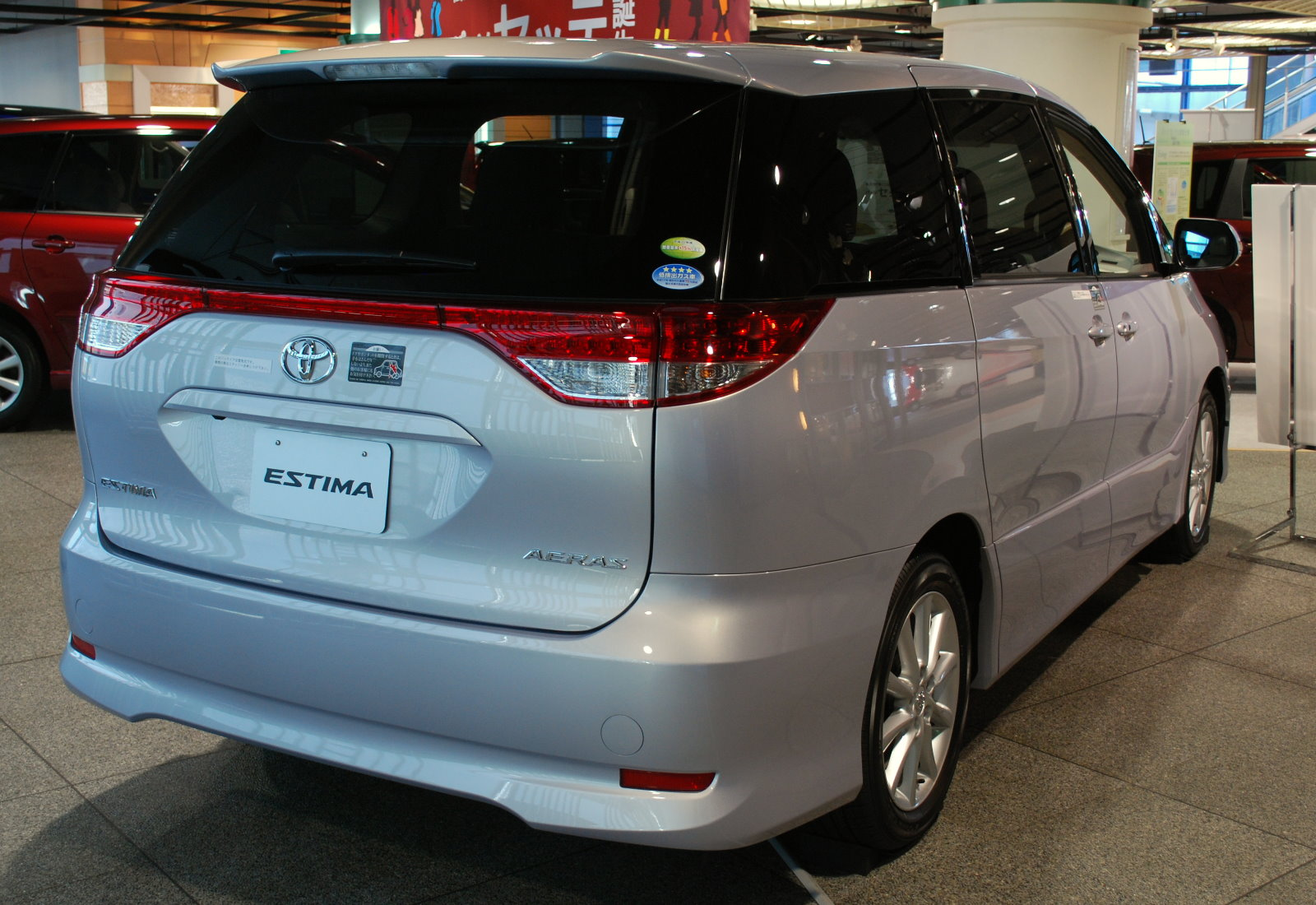
Toyota Estima Aeras (2008 facelift; rear)

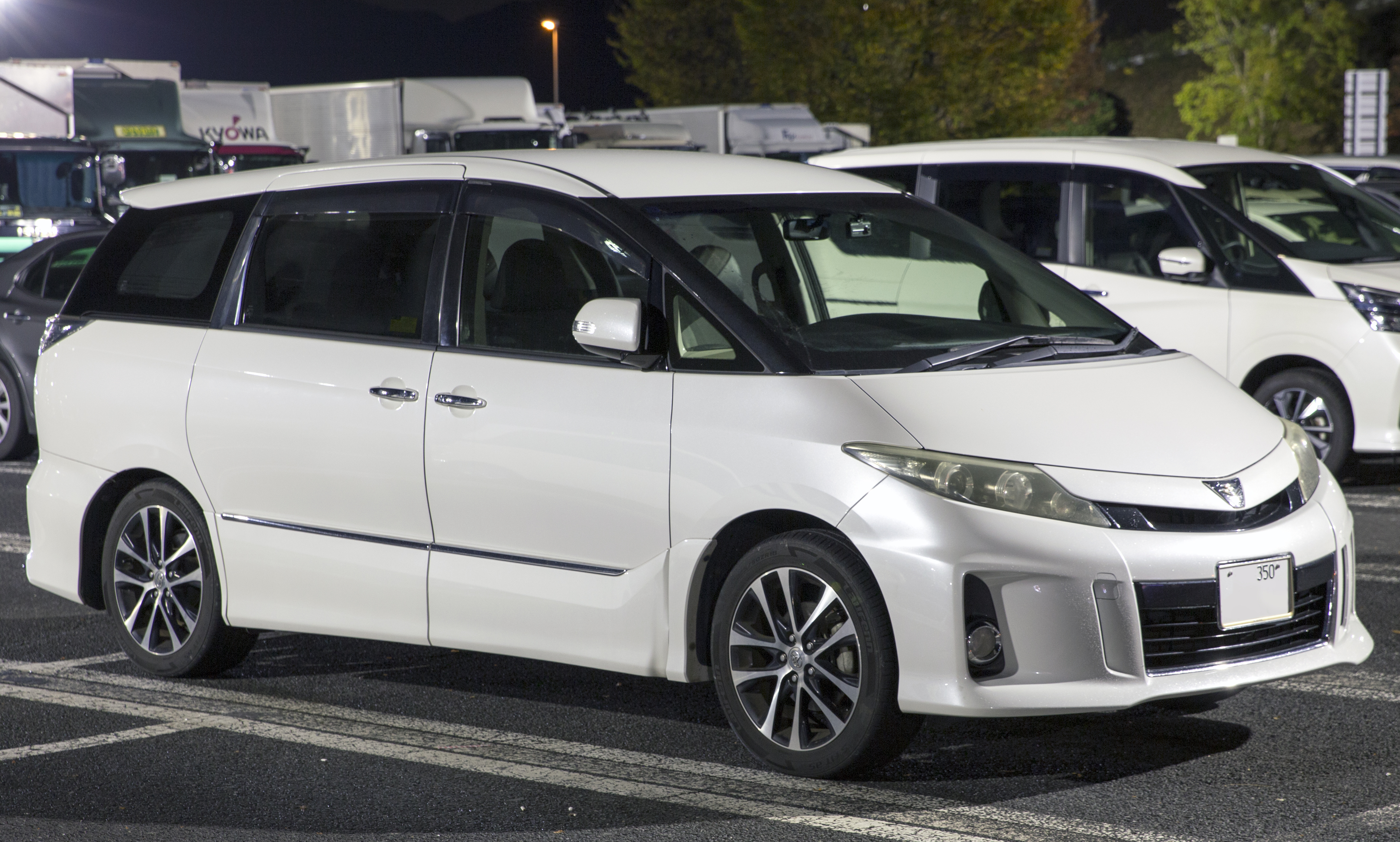
Estima Aeras (2012 facelift)

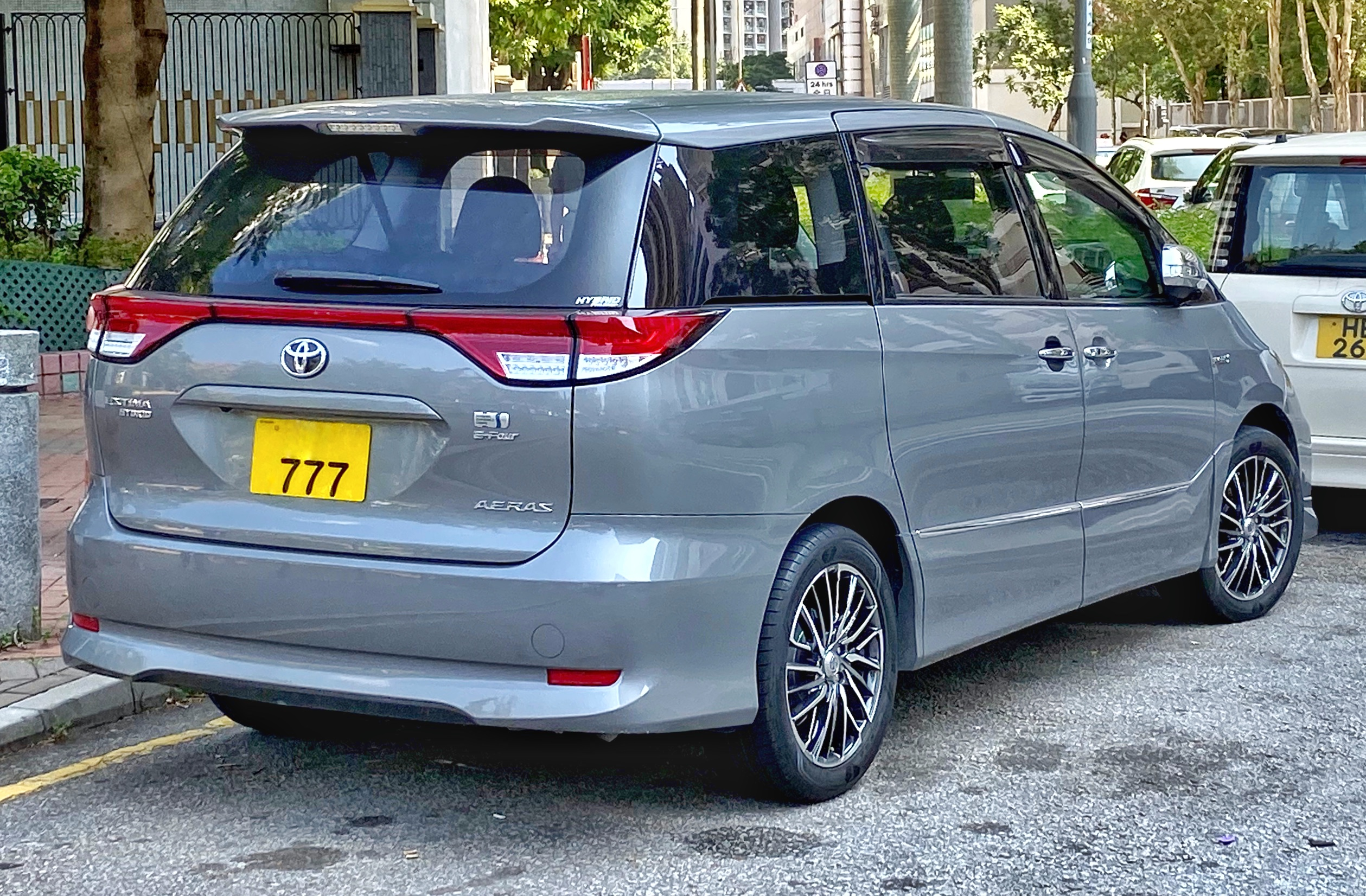
2013 Estima Hybrid Aeras

=== 2016 Facelift ===
The second facelift of the model was launched in mid-2016, its dimensions remain mostly unchanged while it receives various new additional equipment to keep up with its competitors. In the interior features a redesigned multifunction steering wheel and a piano black center console that neatly houses a large touchscreen infotainment display. A new safety system "Toyota Safety Sense C" was offered for the first time in the facelifted Estima, but only for Japanese models. The former includes pre-collision system with pedestrian detection function, lane keep assist, high beam assist and radar cruise control.

Along with the new safety features comes with slightly redesigned headlights with LED daytime running lights, tail lights, bumpers, as well as interior with updated steering wheel design, it also becomes the first Toyota to have 360 degree 99% UV cut glass preventing 99% of UV rays from entering into the vehicle creating a cooler environment overall, this 99% UV cut glass also gets a recommendation from Skin Cancer Foundation and has a SPF 50+/PA++++ rating. The Estima drops its 3.5 L V6 engine option and now only offers the 2.4 L inline-4 producing 170 PS (125 kW), and 224 N⋅m (165 ft⋅lbf) and its hybrid variant.

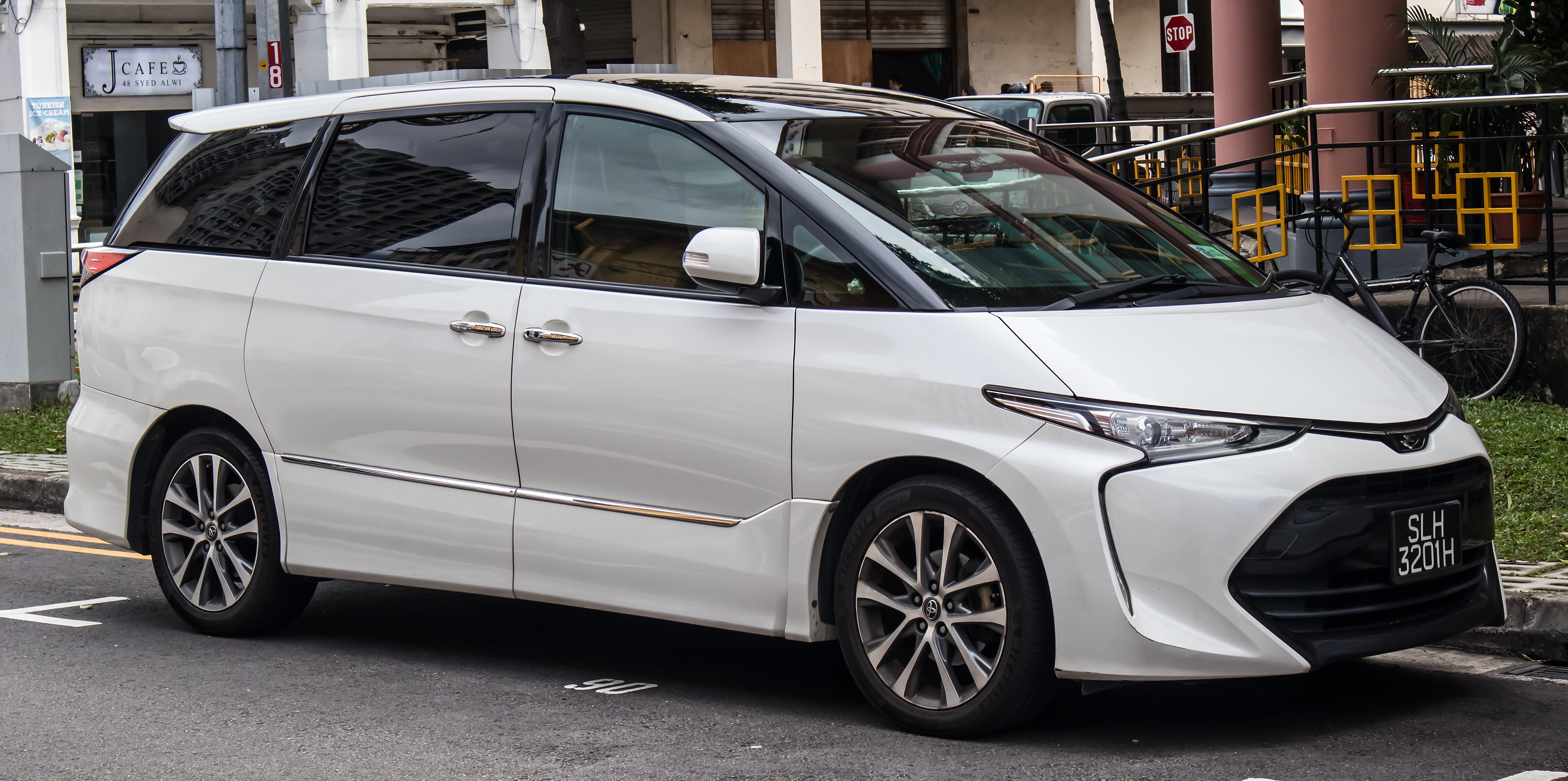
Toyota Estima Aeras (2016 facelift)

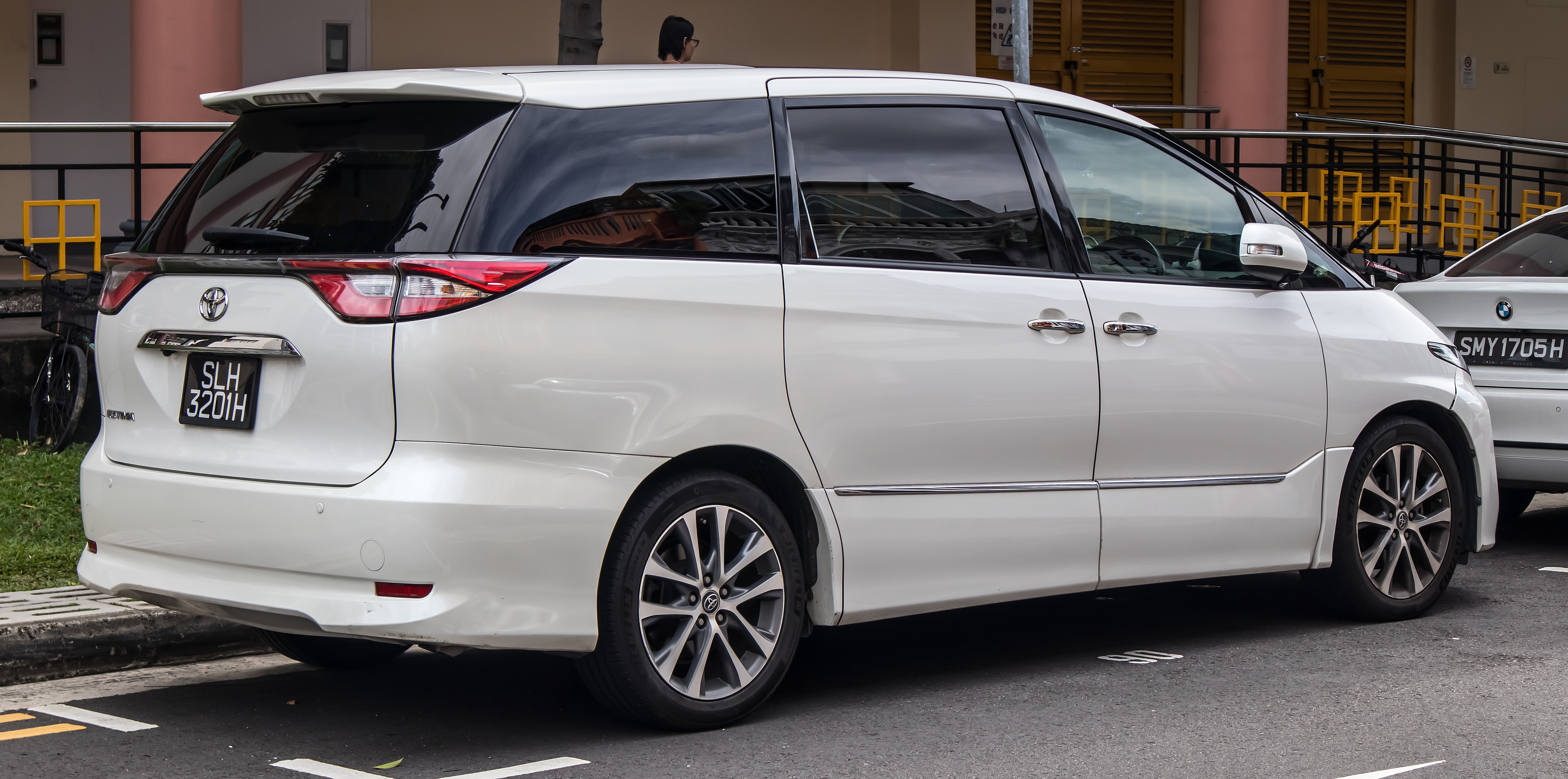
Toyota Estima Aeras (2016 facelift)

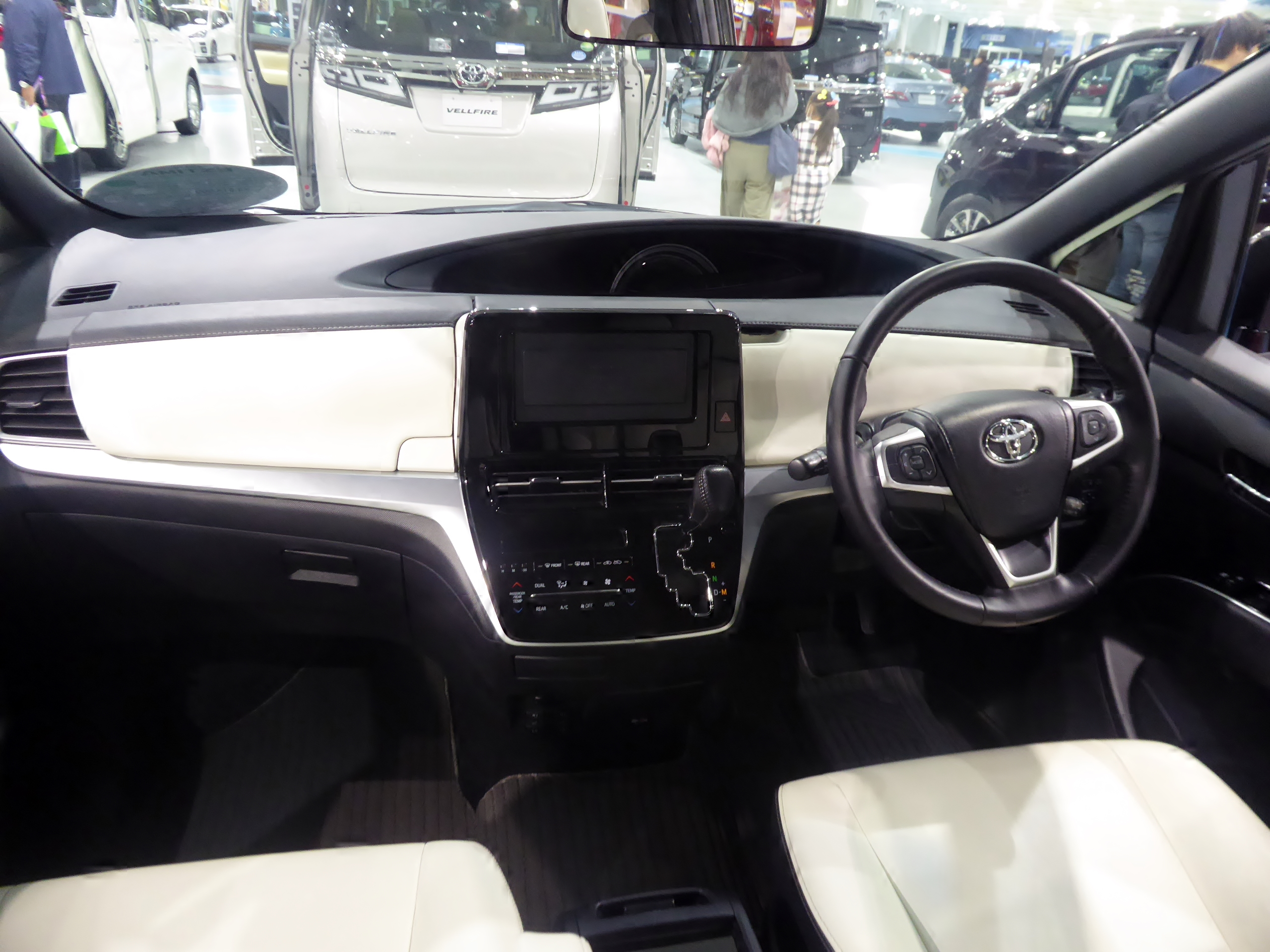
Interior (2016 facelift)

=== Tarago ===
The Australian-market version kept the Tarago name when it was released in March 2006, bearing the ACR50R model code and featuring the 2.4-liter 2AZ-FE inline-four engine found in the ACV40R Camry. In February 2007, Toyota released the GSR50R model with the 3.5-liter 2GR-FE V6 engine producing 202 kW (271 hp) and 340 N⋅m (251 ft⋅lbf) found in the GSV40R Aurion.

The model gained a facelift in 2009 with revised headlamps and bumpers, following the introduction of a seven‑seat option in 2008. A 2012 update added smart start across all variants, smart entry on GLX V6 and Ultima models, upgraded audio systems, automatic headlights, and a new Rustic Brown colour. A major refresh arrived in 2016, bringing an updated interior and additional standard features while retaining the familiar exterior design. The vehicle is offered as a family van, a standard passenger taxi, and a wheelchair‑accessible taxi with a longer wheelbase and integrated ramp.

In May 2019, Toyota revealed the Granvia, which is heavily based on the HiAce van. Toyota Australia confirmed the Granvia would replace the Tarago by the end of 2019, however, they were sold alongside each other for a short period of time. As of March 2020, the Tarago has been discontinued in the Australian market and removed from the Toyota Australia website.

=== Safety ===
ANCAP test results* Toyota Tarago GLi (2007)
Test	Score
Overall	4 /5 stars
Frontal offset	12.45/16
Side impact	16/16
Pole	Not Assessed
Seat belt reminders	2/3
Whiplash protection	Not Assessed
Pedestrian protection	Marginal
Electronic stability control	Optional

ANCAP test results* Toyota Tarago all variants (2010)
Test	Score
Overall	4 /5 stars
Frontal offset	14.45/16
Side impact	16/16
Pole	2/2
Seat belt reminders	2/3
Whiplash protection	Not Assessed
Pedestrian protection	Marginal
Electronic stability control	Standard
