= Toyota C engine =

The Toyota C engine family was a series of inline-4 diesel engines. Japanese market vehicles with diesel engines were exclusive to Toyota Japan dealerships called Toyota Diesel Shop locations from 1979 until the dealership was cancelled in 1988.

There were two earlier generations of an engine Toyota named as the "Type C". The first generation was introduced in 1940 as a modification of the Type A engine and ran on petrol. This first "Type C" was installed in the Toyota AE. The second generation “C” was the diesel engine used in the 1959 Toyota Crown CS20. None of the generations designs are related to each other.

== C ==
The original C engine was first introduced on October 11, 1958 in a prototype Crown Diesel (CS20) at the 5th Tokyo Motor Show with sales commencing on October 19th the following year. Derived from the R-series petrol engine, it has a displacement of 1,491 cc and produces 40 PS (29 kW). It was underpowered, and due to the use of the insufficiently strong R-series block it was also not very durable. When the new 3R engine required a re-designed block, Toyota chose to cancel the C engine rather than re-engineer it. Production ended in March 1961, and Toyota chose to focus on the more powerful diesel J engine which appeared in 1964.

Applications:

- Toyota Crown Diesel (CS20)

Technical specifications:

- Type:4-stroke Inline 4 cylinder, Swirl Chamber Indirect Injection Diesel
- Capacity: 1,491 cc
- Bore: 78 mm
- Stroke: 78 mm
- Compression Ratio: 19:1
- Power: 40 PS (29 kW; 39 hp) at 4000 rpm
- Torque: 8.5 kg⋅m (83 N⋅m; 61 lb⋅ft) at 2400 rpm

== Features at a glance ==
| Code | Capacity (cc) | Bore (mm) | Stroke (mm) | Injection | Turbo |
|---|---|---|---|---|---|
| 1C | 1839 | 83.0 | 85.0 | | |
| 1C-L | 1839 | 83.0 | 85.0 | | |
| 1C-LC | 1839 | 83.0 | 85.0 | | |
| 1C-TL | 1839 | 83.0 | 85.0 | | turbo |
| 1C-TLC | 1839 | 83.0 | 85.0 | | turbo |
| 2C | 1974 | 86.0 | 85.0 | | |
| 2C-L | 1974 | 86.0 | 85.0 | | |
| 2C-E | 1974 | 86.0 | 85.0 | EFI | |
| 2C-T | 1974 | 86.0 | 85.0 | | turbo |
| 2C-TL | 1974 | 86.0 | 85.0 | | turbo |
| 2C-TLC | 1974 | 86.0 | 85.0 | | turbo |
| 2C-TE | 1974 | 86.0 | 85.0 | EFI | turbo |
| 3C | 2184 | 86 | 94 | | |
| 3C-E | 2184 | 86 | 94 | EFI | |
| 3C-T | 2184 | 86 | 94 | | turbo |
| 3C-TE | 2184 | 86 | 94 | EFI | turbo |

== 1C ==
1C

Overview
- Manufacturer: Toyota

Layout
- Displacement: 1.8 L (1839 cc)
- Cylinder bore: 83.0 mm
- Piston stroke: 85.0 mm
- Valvetrain: SOHC
- Compression ratio: 22.5:1 - 23.0:1

Combustion
- Fuel type: diesel

=== 1C, 1C-L, 1C-LC ===
The First Generation 1C was first introduced in the seventh generation Corona on January 26, 1982 and May 12, 1983 for transversely mounted applications as the 1C-L in the front-wheel drive models of the fifth Generation Corolla. It used a direct drive OHC mechanism that would later be adopted by the L series engine.

Technical specifications(1C/1C-L):

- Type:Inline 4, Precombustion Chamber Indirect Injection Diesel
- Fuel injection system:Distributor Type
- Capacity: 1,839 cc
- Bore: 83 mm
- Stroke: 85 mm
- Compression Ratio: 22.5:1

Applications:

63 PS (46 kW; 62 hp) at 4500 rpm, 11.3 kg⋅m (111 N⋅m; 82 lb⋅ft) at 3000 rpm (Japan, Gross JIS)

- CR26 TownAce/LiteAce Van 1982-1988 (Japan only)
- CM20/25 LiteAce Van /LiteAce Truck/TownAce Truck 1982-1986

-

65 PS (48 kW; 64 hp) at 4500 rpm, 11.5 kg⋅m (113 N⋅m; 83 lb⋅ft) at 3000 rpm (Japan, Gross JIS)

- CA60/67 Carina 1.2.1982-1988
- CE70/71/72 Corolla/Sprinter 8.2.1982-1987
- CE80 Corolla/Sprinter 1983-1987
- CT140/147 Corona 1.26.1982-1987

=== 1C-II ===
The second generation 1C engine updated with a higher compression ratio of 23:1

Applications:

64 PS (47 kW; 63 hp) at 4700 rpm, 12 kg⋅m (118 N⋅m; 87 lb⋅ft) at 2600 rpm (Japan, Net JIS)

- CE90/91/96/97 Corolla/Sprinter 1987-1990
- CM35/50 LiteAce Van/LiteAce Truck/TownAce Truck 1985-1989 (Japan only) (may also be available in Australia-CM35RVMRSBEQ)

=== 1C-III ===
Uprated version of the 1C-II

Applications:

67 PS (49 kW; 66 hp) at 4700 rpm, 12.5 kg⋅m (123 N⋅m; 90 lb⋅ft) at 3000 rpm (Japan, Net JIS)

- CE90 Corolla/Sprinter Sedan 1990-1992

=== 1C-TL, 1C-TLC ===
Introduced on August 18, 1983 in the V10-series Camry/Vista it is the turbocharged version of the first generation 1C. This model was only installed in the V10-series Camry/Vista . The European model premiered at the 1983 Frankfurt Motor Show and produces 73 PS (54 kW) at 4500 rpm and 145 N⋅m (107 lb⋅ft) at 2600 rpm.

Applications:

74 PS (54 kW; 73 hp) at 4500 rpm, 14.3 kg⋅m (140 N⋅m; 103 lb⋅ft) at 3000 rpm (US, Net SAE)

73 PS (54 kW; 72 hp) at 4700 rpm, 14.8 kg⋅m (145 N⋅m; 107 lb⋅ft) at 2600 rpm (Europe)

80 PS (59 kW; 79 hp) at 4700 rpm, 15.5 kg⋅m (152 N⋅m; 112 lb⋅ft) at 2400 rpm (Japan, Gross JIS)

- CV10 Camry/Vista 1983-1985

== 2C ==
2C

Overview
- Manufacturer: Toyota
- Production: 1983-2013

Layout
- Configuration: Inline-4
- Displacement: 2.0 L (1974 cc)
- Cylinder bore: 86.0 mm (3.39 in)
- Piston stroke: 85.0 mm (3.35 in)
- Cylinder block material: Cast Iron
- Cylinder head material: Aluminum
- Valvetrain: SOHC 2 valves per cylinder
- Valvetrain drive system: Timing belt
- Compression ratio: 22.5:1 - 23.0:1

Combustion
- Turbocharger: Toyota CT12 or CT9 turbo
- Fuel system: Mechanical fuel injection Electronic fuel injection
- Fuel type: Diesel
- Oil system: Wet sump
- Cooling system: Water-cooled

Output
- Power output: 68–91 PS (67–90 hp; 50–67 kW)
- Torque output: 126–190 N⋅m (13–19 kg⋅m; 93–140 lb⋅ft)

Dimensions
- Dry weight: 400 lbs

The 2C was a long running diesel engine, with some models (e.g. Corona, Townace, Liteace) receiving the turbo version 2C-T which provided 65 kW. It was replaced by the more economical 3C-TE in the above models from 1999.

=== 2C, 2C-L ===
Output:

- 2C, 2C-L: 73 hp (54 kW) at 4700 rpm, and torque 97 lb·ft (132 N·m) at 3000 rpm

Applications:

- CT141 Corona taxi 1986-1991
- CXC10 Deliboy 1991-1994
- CM26 LiteAce 1985-1986 (Japan)

68 PS (50 kW; 67 hp) at 4500 rpm, 12 kg⋅m (118 N⋅m; 87 lb⋅ft) at 3000 rpm (Europe, DIN)

72 PS (53 kW; 71 hp) at 4500 rpm, 12.8 kg⋅m (126 N⋅m; 93 lb⋅ft) at 2600 rpm (Japan, Gross JIS)

- CT150 Carina/Carina II/Corona1984-1988 (Japan)

=== 2C-II ===
The second generation 2C engine updated with a higher compression ratio of 23:1

Applications:

70 PS (51 kW; 69 hp) at 4600 rpm, 13.1 kg⋅m (128 N⋅m; 95 lb⋅ft) at 2600 rpm (Europe, EEC)

- CT150 Carina II1985-1988

70 PS (51 kW; 69 hp) at 4700 rpm, 13 kg⋅m (127 N⋅m; 94 lb⋅ft) at 2600 rpm (Japan, Net JIS)

75 PS (55 kW; 74 hp) at 4700 rpm, 13.5 kg⋅m (132 N⋅m; 98 lb⋅ft) at 2600 rpm (Japan, Gross JIS)

- CM30/31/36/41LiteAce Van and Wagon 1985-1992(Japan only)
- CR21/27/28/36 TownAce/LiteAce 1984-1996
- CM51/52/55/60/61/65 LiteAce / TownAce Truck 1989-1999 (Japan)

=== 2C-III ===
Uprated version of the 2C-II

Applications:

72 PS (53 kW; 71 hp) at 4600 rpm, 13.4 kg⋅m (131 N⋅m; 97 lb⋅ft) at 2800 rpm (Pakistan, Net SAE)

- CE120 Corolla (Altis) 2001-2004 (Asia)
- CE140 Corolla (Altis) (Asia)

73 PS (54 kW; 72 hp) at 4700 rpm, 13.5 kg⋅m (132 N⋅m; 98 lb⋅ft) at 3000 rpm (Japan, Net JIS)

- CE95 Corolla/Sprinter 1989-1991 (Japan)

73 PS (54 kW; 72 hp) at 4700 rpm, 13.5 kg⋅m (132 N⋅m; 98 lb⋅ft) at 2800rpm (Japan, Net JIS)

- CE100/104/106/108/109 Corolla/Sprinter 1991-1998 (Japan)/1995-1998

73 PS (54 kW; 72 hp) at 4700 rpm, 13.2 kg⋅m (129 N⋅m; 95 lb⋅ft) at 2800rpm (Japan, Net JIS)

- CE110/114 Corolla/Sprinter Sedan 1995-2001

73 PS (54 kW; 72 hp) at 4700 rpm, 13.5 kg⋅m (132 N⋅m; 98 lb⋅ft) at 3000rpm (Japan, Net JIS)/(Europe)

- CT170/176/177 Carina/Corona/Carina II 1987-1992 (Japan)

73 PS (54 kW; 72 hp) at 4700 rpm, 13.2 kg⋅m (129 N⋅m; 95 lb⋅ft) at 2500rpm (Japan, Net JIS)

- CR41V/51V TownAce/LiteAce Van 1996-1999

70 PS (51 kW; 69 hp) at 4600 rpm, 13.4 kg⋅m (131 N⋅m; 97 lb⋅ft) at 2500 rpm (Europe, EEC)

73 PS (54 kW; 72 hp) at 4700 rpm, 13.5 kg⋅m (132 N⋅m; 98 lb⋅ft) at 2800rpm (Japan, Net JIS)

- CT190/190G/195/196/198 Caldina/Carina/Corona/Carina E 1992-1996

70 PS (51 kW; 69 hp) at 4600 rpm, 12.7 kg⋅m (125 N⋅m; 92 lb⋅ft) at 3000 rpm (Philippines, Net SAE)

- CF50 Tamaraw FX Wagon/Tamaraw Truck 1994-1998 (Philippines)

=== 2C-E ===
EFI version of the 2C-III

Applications:

72 PS (53 kW; 71 hp) at 4600 rpm, 16.3 kg⋅m (160 N⋅m; 118 lb⋅ft) at 2600 rpm (Europe) 75 PS (55 kW; 74 hp) at 4500 rpm, 16.3 kg⋅m (160 N⋅m; 118 lb⋅ft) at 2400 rpm (Japan; JIS Net)

- CE110 Corolla 23.05.1997-01.02.2000

=== 2C-T, 2C-TL, 2C-TLC ===
Turbocharged version of the 2C engine with a compression ratio of 22.5:1

Applications:

80 PS (59 kW; 79 hp) at 4500 rpm, 16.2 kg⋅m (159 N⋅m; 117 lb⋅ft) at 3000rpm (US, Net SAE)

- CV11 Camry/Vista 1985-1986

=== 2C-(II)T ===
Turbocharged variant of the higher compression 2C-II engine adopting the Ceramic reinforced pistons from the 2LTE series.

Note: Toyota

Applications:

82 PS (60 kW; 81 hp) at 4500 rpm, 16.3 kg⋅m (160 N⋅m; 118 lb⋅ft) at 2400rpm (Japan, Net JIS)

- CM30/40 LiteAce 1985-1992 (Japan only)

84 PS (62 kW; 83 hp) at 4500 rpm, 16.7 kg⋅m (164 N⋅m; 121 lb⋅ft) at 2400rpm (Europe)

82 PS (60 kW; 81 hp) at 4500 rpm, 16.3 kg⋅m (160 N⋅m; 118 lb⋅ft) at 2400rpm (Japan, Net JIS)

- CV20 Camry/Vista 1986-1991

82 PS (60 kW; 81 hp) at 4500 rpm, 16.3 kg⋅m (160 N⋅m; 118 lb⋅ft) at 2400rpm (Japan, Net JIS)

88 PS (65 kW; 87 hp) at 4000 rpm, 17 kg⋅m (167 N⋅m; 123 lb⋅ft) at 2400rpm (Japan, Gross JIS)

- CR21/28/30/37 LiteAce/TownAce 1984-1992 (Japan only)

=== 2C-(III)T ===
Revised variant of the 2C-(II)T fitted with Diesel Smoke Control System to meet stricter Japanese and Euro 2 emission standards.

Applications:

- CT220 Avensis 1997-2000 (ex. Europe)

Non Intercooled

82 PS (60 kW; 81 hp) at 4000 rpm, 17.7 kg⋅m (174 N⋅m; 128 lb⋅ft) at 2000rpm (Europe)

- CT190/190G Carina E/Caldina 1994-1997

88 PS (65 kW; 87 hp) at 4000 rpm, 18 kg⋅m (177 N⋅m; 130 lb⋅ft) at 2200rpm (Japan, Net JIS)

- CT210/215 Corona/Carina 1996-1997

Intercooled

91 PS (67 kW; 90 hp) at 4400 rpm, 19.4 kg⋅m (190 N⋅m; 140 lb⋅ft) at 2600rpm (Japan, Net JIS)

- CV30 Camry/Vista 1990-1994

=== 2C-TE ===
EFI variant of the 2C-(III)T adopting electronic throttle control.

Applications:

90 PS (66 kW; 89 hp) at 4000 rpm, 20.7 kg⋅m (203 N⋅m; 150 lb⋅ft) at 2200 rpm (Europe)

- CT220 Avensis 1997-2000 (Europe only)

== 3C ==
3C

Overview
- Manufacturer: Toyota

Layout
- Displacement: 2.2 L (2184 cc)
- Cylinder bore: 86.0 mm
- Piston stroke: 94.0 mm
- Valvetrain: SOHC
- Compression ratio: 22.0:1 - 23.0:1

Combustion
- Fuel type: diesel

Although having a larger displacement than the 2C-T, the 3C-TE was more economical and powerful at 100 PS. The C series engines were replaced by the CD series in the European market, while Toyota stopped selling diesel non-commercial models in Japan after the 3C-TE.

=== 3C-E ===
EFI version with compression ratio of 23.0:1

79.0 PS (58.0 kW; 78.0 HP) at 4,400 rpm

Applications:

- CT197/199 Caldina 19.08.1998-07.2002 (Japan only)
- CR42/52 LiteAce/TownAce 1998-2006 (Japan only)

79 PS (58 kW; 78 hp) at 4400 rpm, 15 kg⋅m (147 N⋅m; 108 lb⋅ft) at 2400 rpm (Japan, Net JIS)

- CE101/102/105/107 Corolla/Sprinter Van and Wagon 1998-2002 (Japan only)
- CE113/116 Corolla/Sprinter Sedan 1998-2000 (Japan only)
- CE121 Corolla/Corolla Fielder 2000-2002 (Japan only)
- CM70/75/80/85 LiteAce / TownAce 06.1999–08.2004 (Japan only)

=== 3C-T ===
Turbocharged version with compression ratio of 22.6:1(Non Intercooled) or 20.0:1(Intercooled).

From 88.0 PS (65.0 kW; 87.0 HP) at 4,000 rpm to 91.0 PS (67.0 kW; 90.0 HP) at 4,000 rpm

Applications:

Non Intercooled

- CR22/29/31/38 LiteAce / TownAce 1993-1996 (Japan only)

91 PS (67 kW; 90 hp) at 4000 rpm, 19.6 kg⋅m (192 N⋅m; 142 lb⋅ft) at 2000 rpm (Japan, Net JIS)

- CV40/43 Vista/Camry 1994-1998 (Japan only)

91 PS (67 kW; 90 hp) at 4000 rpm, 19.8 kg⋅m (194 N⋅m; 143 lb⋅ft) at 2200 rpm (Japan, Net JIS)

- CR40G/50G LiteAce Noah / TownAce Noah 1996-2001 (Japan only)

Intercooled

100 PS (74 kW; 99 hp) at 4200 rpm, 22 kg⋅m (216 N⋅m; 159 lb⋅ft) at 2600 rpm (Japan, Net JIS)

- CXR10/11/20/21 Estima Lucida/Estima Emina 1993-1999 (Japan only)

=== 3C-TE ===
Turbocharged version with EFI and compression ratio of 22.6:1.

From 94.0 PS (69.0 kW; 92.0 HP) at 4,400 rpm to 100.0 PS (74.0 kW; 99.0 HP) at 4,200 rpm

Applications:

Non Intercooled

90 PS (66 kW; 89 hp) at 4000 rpm, 20.9 kg⋅m (205 N⋅m; 151 lb⋅ft) at 2000-2400 rpm (Europe)

94 PS (69 kW; 93 hp) at 4000 rpm, 21.0 kg⋅m (206 N⋅m; 152 lb⋅ft) at 2200 rpm (Japan, Net JIS)

- CXM10 Gaia/Ipsum/ Picnic

-

94 PS (69 kW; 93 hp) at 4000 rpm, 21.5 kg⋅m (211 N⋅m; 156 lb⋅ft) at 2000 rpm (Japan, Net JIS)

- CR40G/50G LiteAce Noah / TownAce Noah

-

94 PS (69 kW; 93 hp) at 4000 rpm, 21.0 kg⋅m (206 N⋅m; 152 lb⋅ft) at 2200 rpm (Japan, Net JIS)

- CT211/216/216G Carina/Corona/Caldina 1998-2001 (Japan only)

Intercooled

105 PS (77 kW; 104 hp) at 4200 rpm, 23 kg⋅m (226 N⋅m; 166 lb⋅ft) at 2600 rpm (Japan, Net JIS)

- CXR10/11/20/21 Estima Lucida 1993-1999 (Japan only)
