= Toyota Gaia =

Toyota Gaia (XM10)
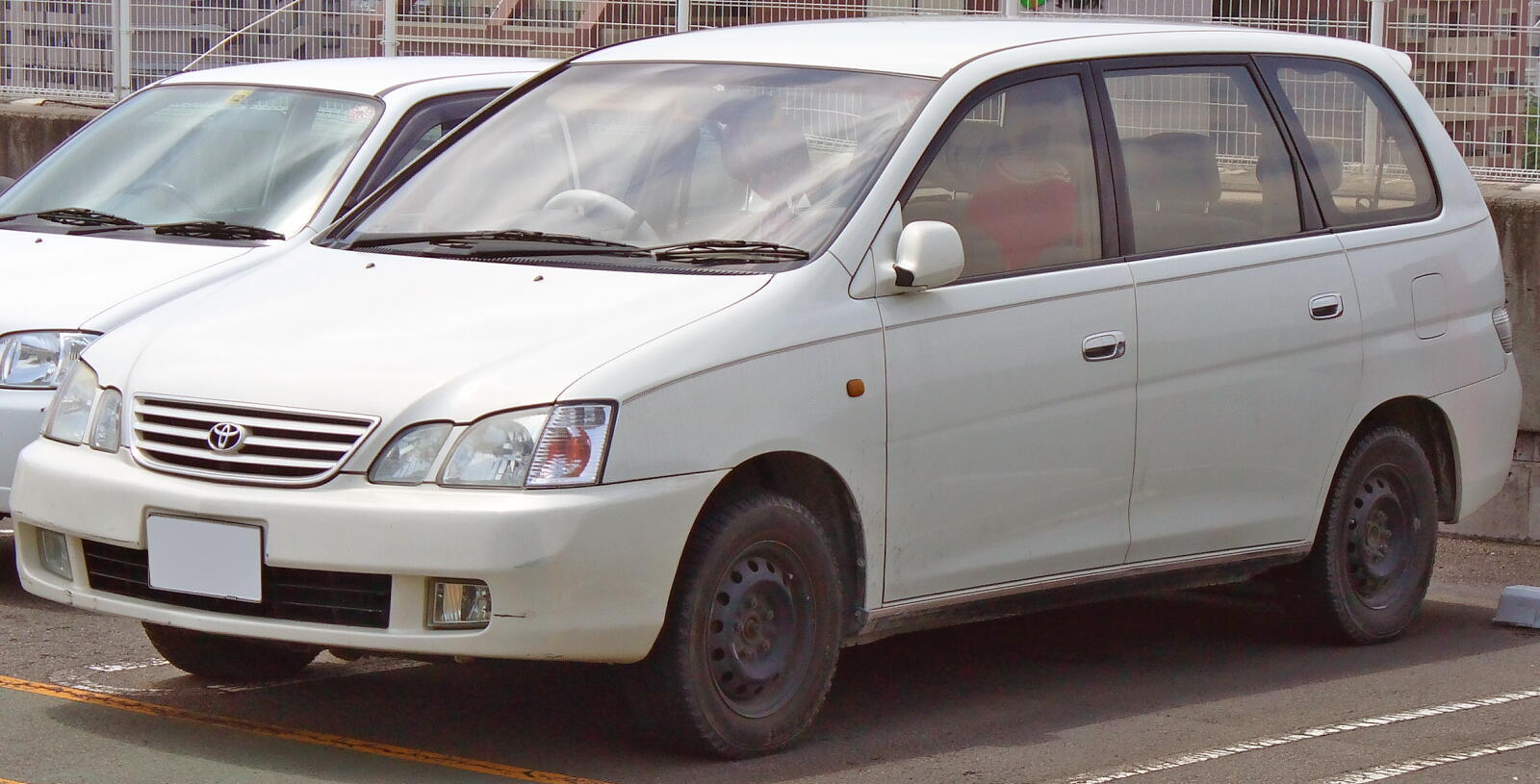
- 1998 Toyota Gaia (pre-facelift)

Overview
- Manufacturer: Toyota
- Production: May 1998 – September 2004
- Assembly: Japan: Toyota City, Aichi (Motomachi plant); Kariya, Aichi (Toyota Auto Body)

Body and chassis
- Class: Compact MPV
- Body style: 5-door station wagon
- Layout: Front-engine, front-wheel-drive; Front-engine, four-wheel-drive
- Related: Toyota Ipsum (XM10); Toyota Nadia

Powertrain
- Engine: 2.0 L DOHC 3S-FE I4; 2.0 L DOHC 1AZ-FSE I4; 2.2 L SOHC 3C-TE turbo-diesel I4
- Transmission: 4-speed automatic

Dimensions
- Wheelbase: 2,735 mm (107.7 in)
- Length: 4,620 mm (181.9 in)
- Width: 1,695 mm (66.7 in)
- Height: 1,640 mm (64.6 in)
- Curb weight: 1,250 kg (2,755.8 lb)

Chronology
- Successor: Toyota Isis

The Toyota Gaia is a Japanese-market MPV produced from May 1998 until September 2004. It competed with the Nissan Prairie, Mitsubishi Chariot, and Honda Odyssey, and was later replaced by the Isis. The Gaia is a sister model to the Ipsum and Nadia and shares a platform with the Corona Premio and Caldina. It was sold only at Toyopet Store dealerships.

The vehicle was named for Gaia, the Greek goddess personifying the Earth.

== Overview ==
Sales of the Gaia began on May 29, 1998. At launch, it was available with optional four-wheel drive and a choice of the 3S-FE gasoline engine or the 3C-TE diesel engine, the latter only being available with front-wheel drive. All powertrain options used a column-shifted 4-speed automatic transmission.

An April 13, 2001 facelift replaced the 3S-FE in FWD models with the direct-injected 1AZ-FSE. In October of 2001, the "Limited Navi Special" trim was launched, featuring a DVD-based navigation system (a precursor to Toyota's G-Book). On August 9, 2002, the 1AZ-FSE replaced the 3S-FE in 4WD models, and an "S-Edition" trim became available.

Production ended in August 2004, and sales ended the following month.

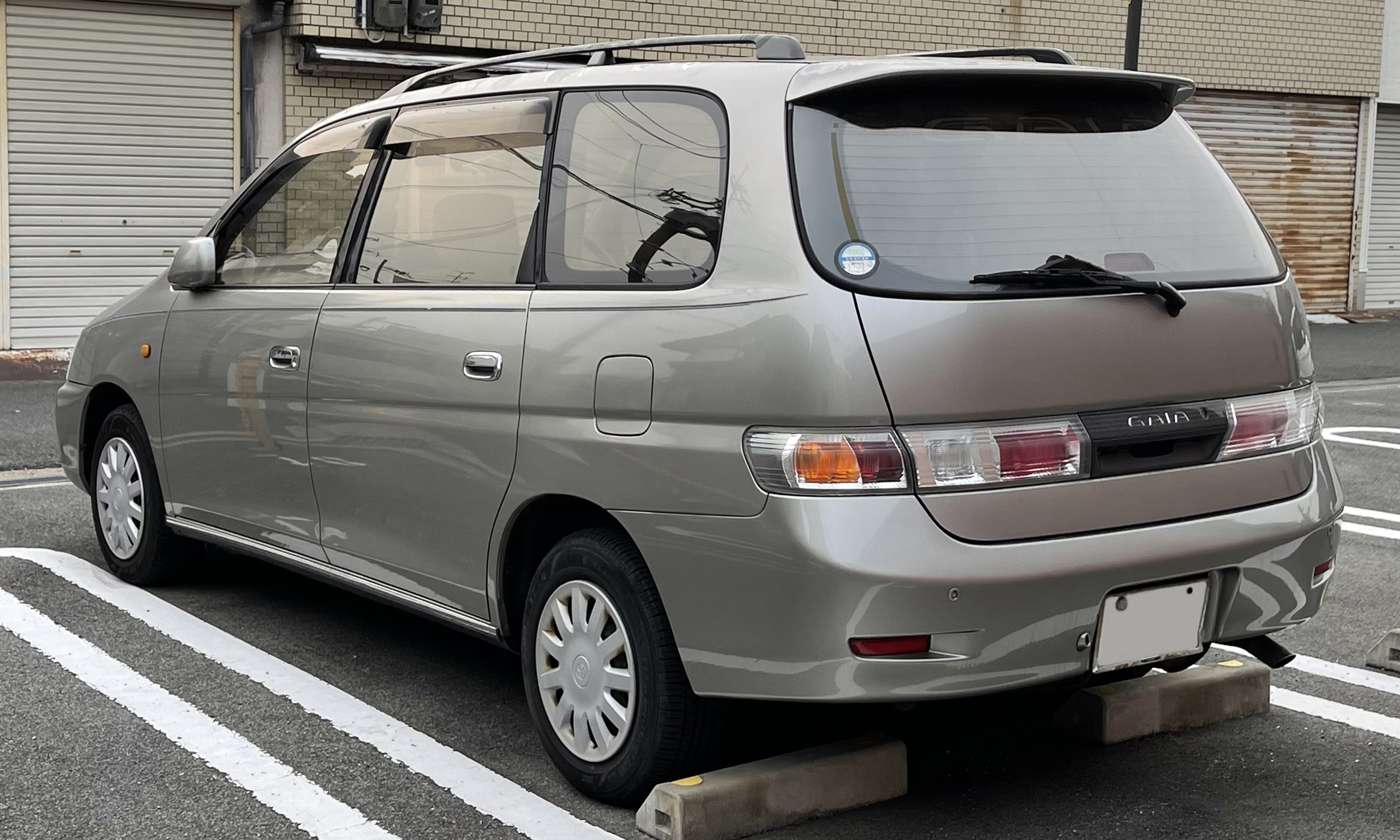
Gaia G Package (pre-facelift)

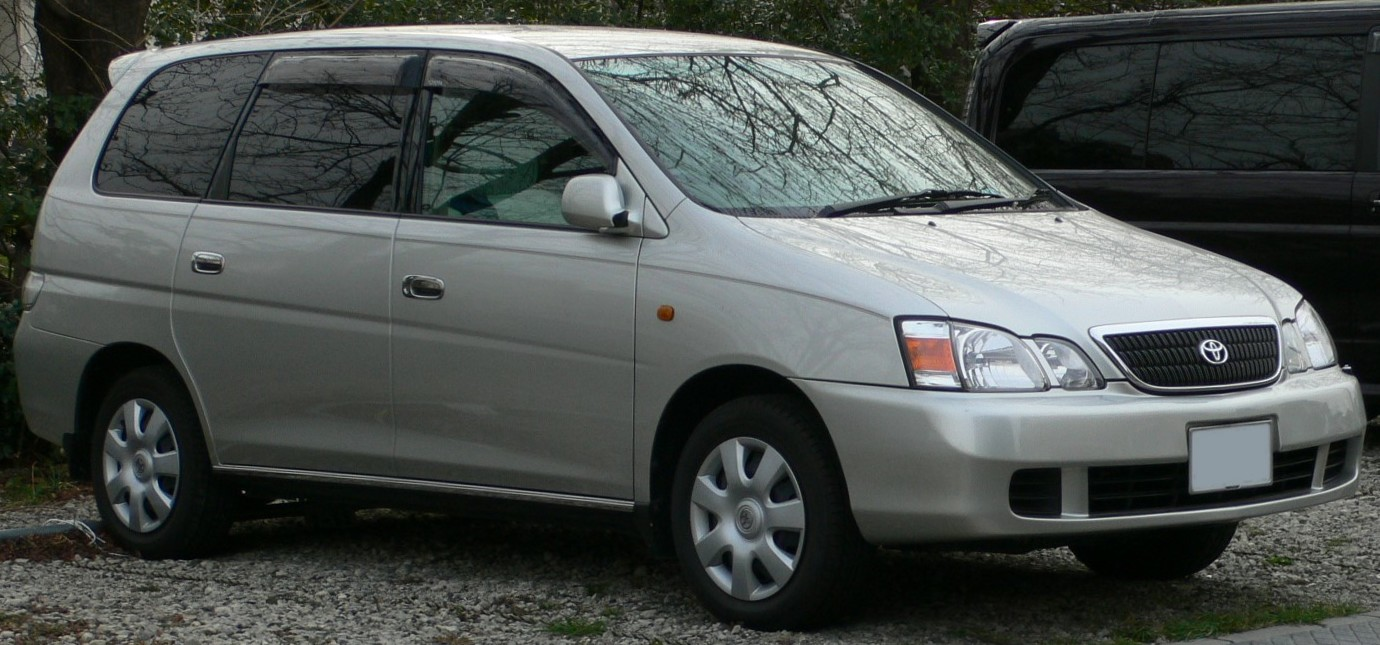
2001 Gaia (facelift)

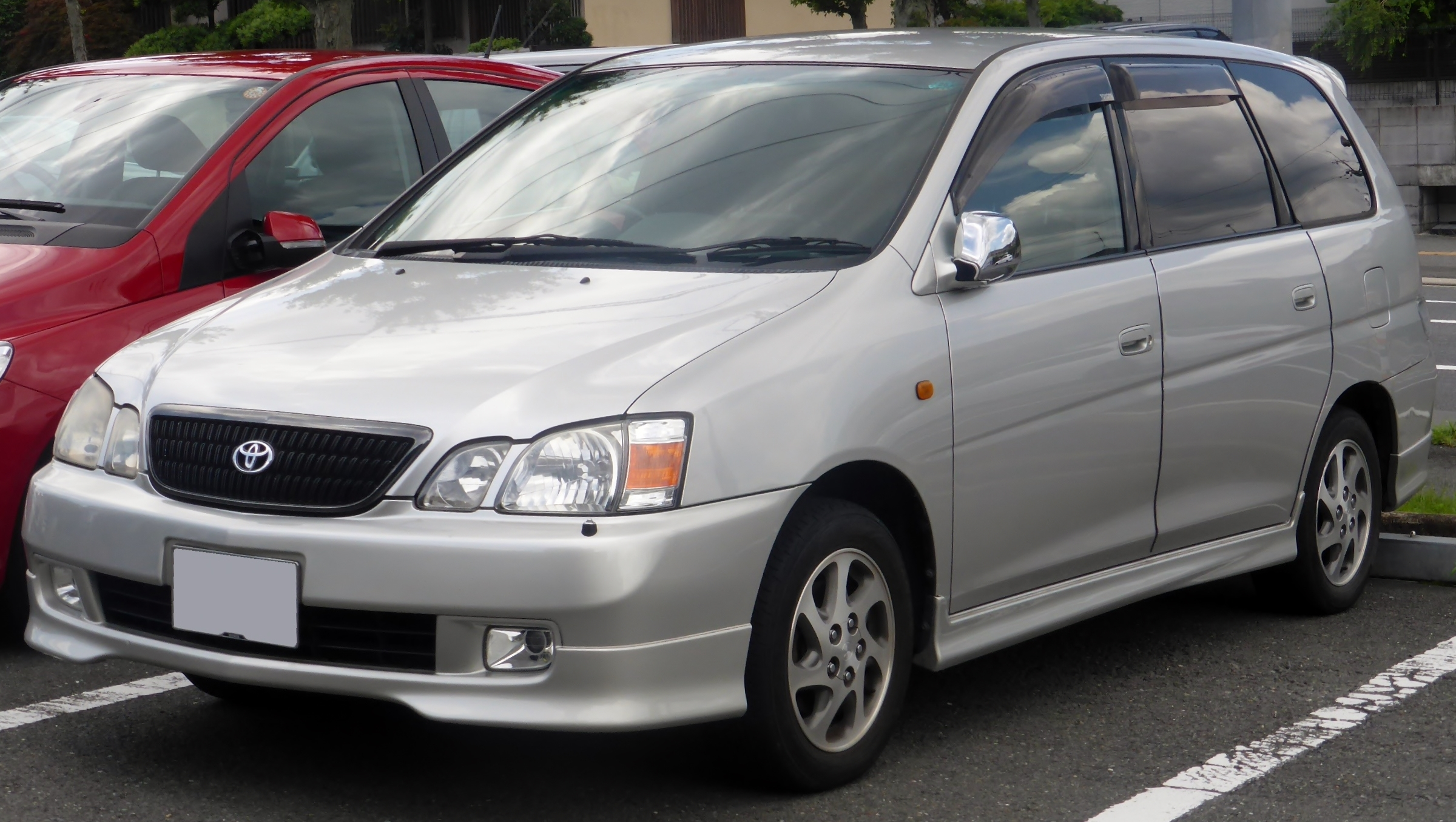
Gaia S-Edition (facelift)
