= Toyota Nadia =

Toyota Nadia (XN10)
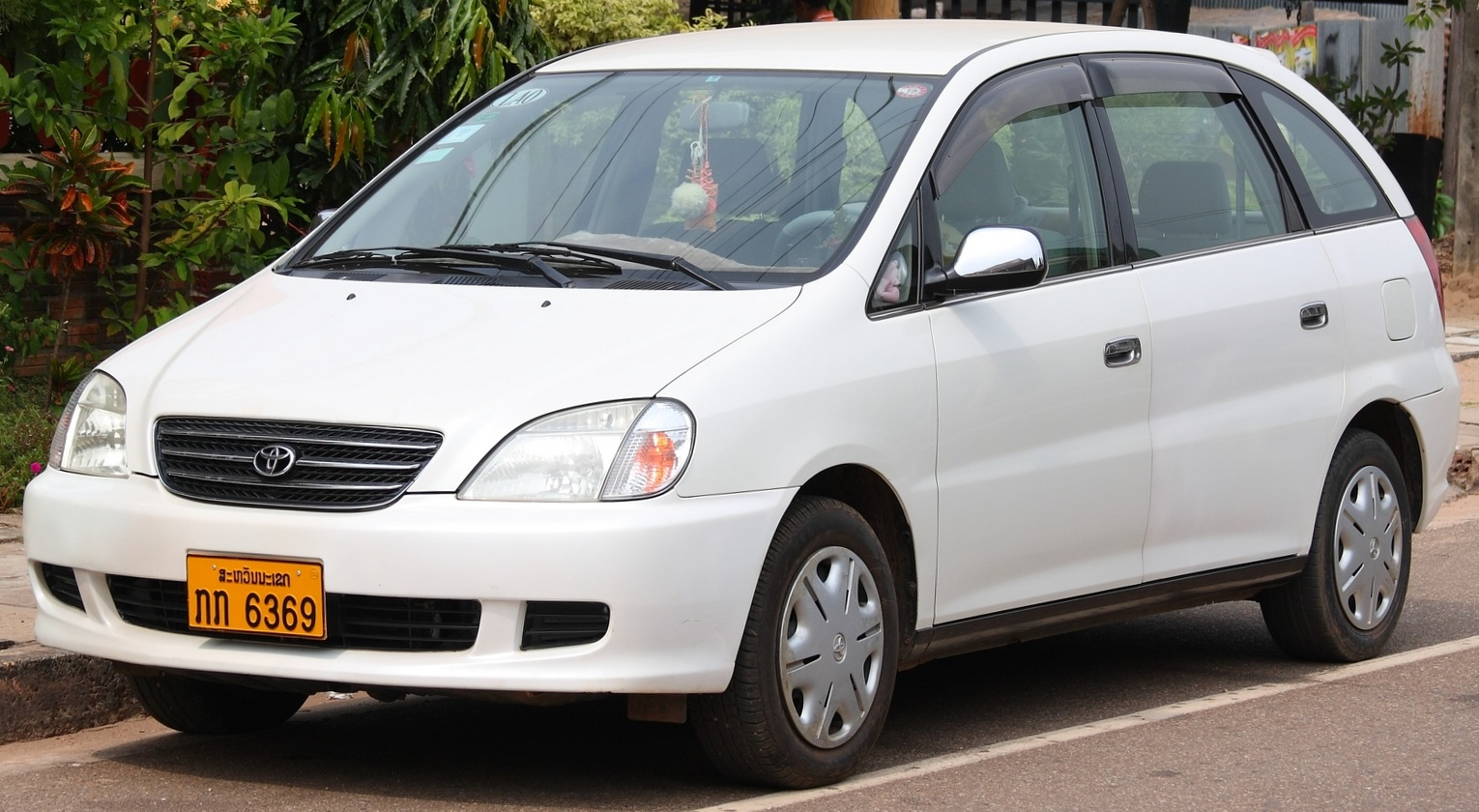
- 1998–2001 Toyota Nadia (pre-facelift)

Overview
- Manufacturer: Toyota
- Production: August 1998 – October 2003
- Assembly: Japan: Kariya, Aichi (Toyota Auto Body)

Body and chassis
- Class: Compact MPV
- Body style: 5-door station wagon
- Layout: Front-engine, front-wheel-drive; Front-engine, four-wheel-drive
- Related: Toyota Avensis Picnic/Ipsum/Picnic/SportsVan (XM10); Toyota Gaia

Powertrain
- Engine: 2.0 L I4 DOHC 3S-FE; 2.0 L I4 DOHC 1AZ-FSE
- Transmission: 4-speed automatic

Dimensions
- Wheelbase: 2,735 mm (107.7 in)
- Length: 4,435–4,450 mm (174.6–175.2 in)
- Width: 1,695–1,735 mm (66.7–68.3 in)
- Height: 1,650–1,725 mm (65.0–67.9 in)
- Curb weight: 1,420–1,470 kg (3,130.6–3,240.8 lb)

Chronology
- Successor: Toyota Corolla Spacio

The Toyota Nadia is a compact MPV produced by the Japanese automaker Toyota from 1998 to 2003. It was sold only at Japanese dealerships called Toyota Corolla Store next to the Corolla and popular in the Russian Far East (Yakutsk, Vladivostok etc.).

The name "Nadia" comes from Nadezhda, which means "Надежда" ("Hope") in Russian. It is also known as a female name.

== Overview ==
The Nadia is a minivan-style tall wagon with a two-row seat developed based on the Ipsum. Although the total length is shorter than Ipsum, the wheelbase is the same, and it was divided into five-seater with no third row seat, so the seat space where the seat can be slid is not limited to the brother car (Ipsum and Gaia). It is wider than the first-class car Century. A wide range of seat arrangements was possible depending on the grade.

At the beginning of the launch, the category of "5-seater wagons with high eyepoints" was prevalent in Europe, and Nissan's R'nessa, which has a similar concept, and Tino, and Toyota Opa handled by Toyopet stores were in a competitive relationship.

The style is a rounded one-motion form similar to that of the second generation Estima, and the interior is designed differently from the siblings in the upper half of the instrument panel and the center console, and adopts a virtual center projection digital center meter. In 1999, the crossover SUV variant, type SU was added.

The engines are all 2.0 L engines. Initially, the 3S-FE high-mechanism twin-cam engine with port injection and the 3S-FSE gasoline direct-injection (D-4) engine were installed in the 2WD standard car (5 number car). (Note: 3S-FSE is the only one in the first Ipsum series.) The D-4 engine car was equipped with a SuperECT with a flex lockup.

The tire size was not Ipsum's 14-inch, but 195/60R15 size flat tires (215/60R16 for type SU added later) with the outer diameter up. Also, as a change from the base car, the front brake has been increased in diameter (Note: 15-inch version similar to the facelifted Gaia.) and the suspension has been changed because it is not necessary to assume a heavy multi-seater ride, and it is a sporty with plenty of strokes and improved responsiveness. It is shaken by the ride.

It is the only "stepping type" parking brake among the three Ipsum brothers, and the notification type at the time of the Ministry of Transport is also N type compared to the M type of Ipsum and Gaia.

The RV boom at the beginning of Heisei ended, and the passenger car market was a vehicle that was sold during the transition period from wagons to minivans.

== Timeline ==
- August 1998 – Released.
- October 1998 – Customized car "American Billet Version" by Modellista appears. By installing special aero parts, it became a 3-number frame with a total width of 1,715 mm. Black metallic is available as a dedicated color (this can later be selected for normal models).
- 1999 – type SU added, featuring revised bumper and wheel, overfenders (making the vehicle wider than 1.7 m), revised suspension and a slightly larger outer diameter. There were a wide variety of changes, such as adopting the tires, and the SUV-like appearance came out more than the normal model. The model is changed due to the wide body specifications (SXN10H, SXN15H). In addition, the wheel of the first Harrier is diverted.
- April 2001 – Minor change. The new generation D-4 engine, 1AZ-FSE engine is installed in the 2WD vehicle. On the exterior, the design of the headlamp and taillamp was changed, and some grades were equipped with a discharge headlamp (common to Toyota's first Hi/Lo), and the design of the standard grille and front bumper was also changed. For the interior, the steering design was changed, the meter was converted to analog and Optitron, the auto air conditioner was changed for all cars, the design of the air conditioner panel was changed, and the audio panel was changed to wide 2DIN. The L grade has a power seat for the driver's seat and the S grade has a bench seat.
- 2002 – Partially improved and all models use D-4 engine.
- October 2003 – End of production.

== Gallery ==
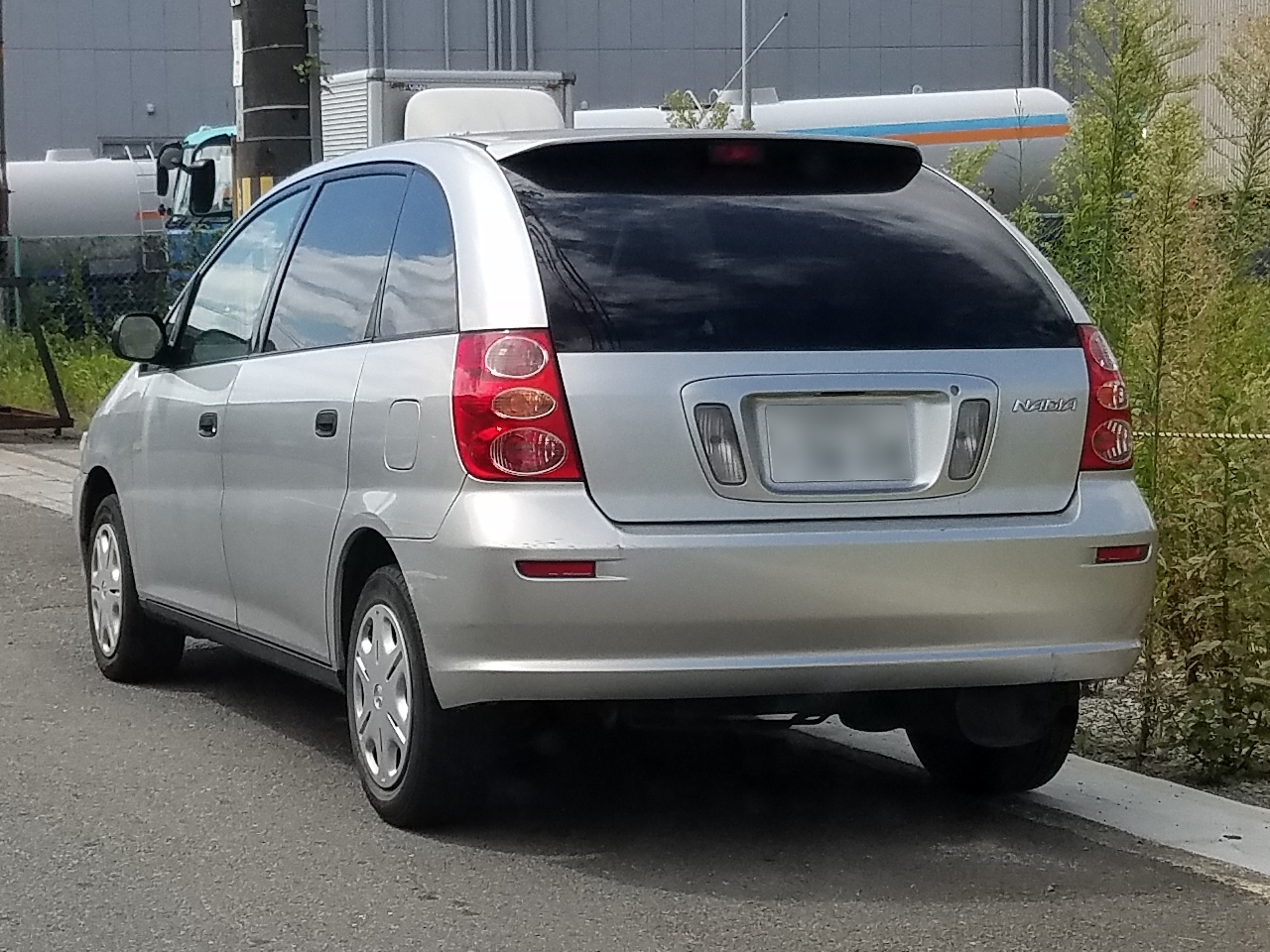
1998–2001 Toyota Nadia (pre-facelift)

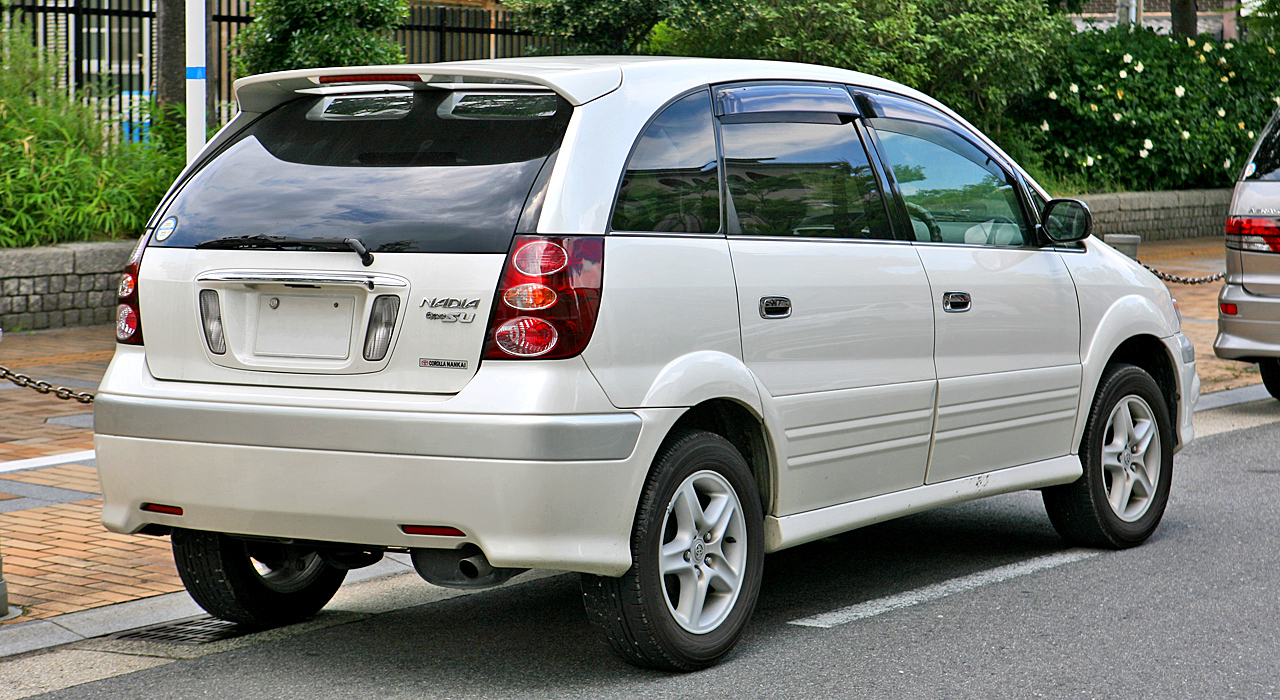
1999–2001 Toyota Nadia type SU

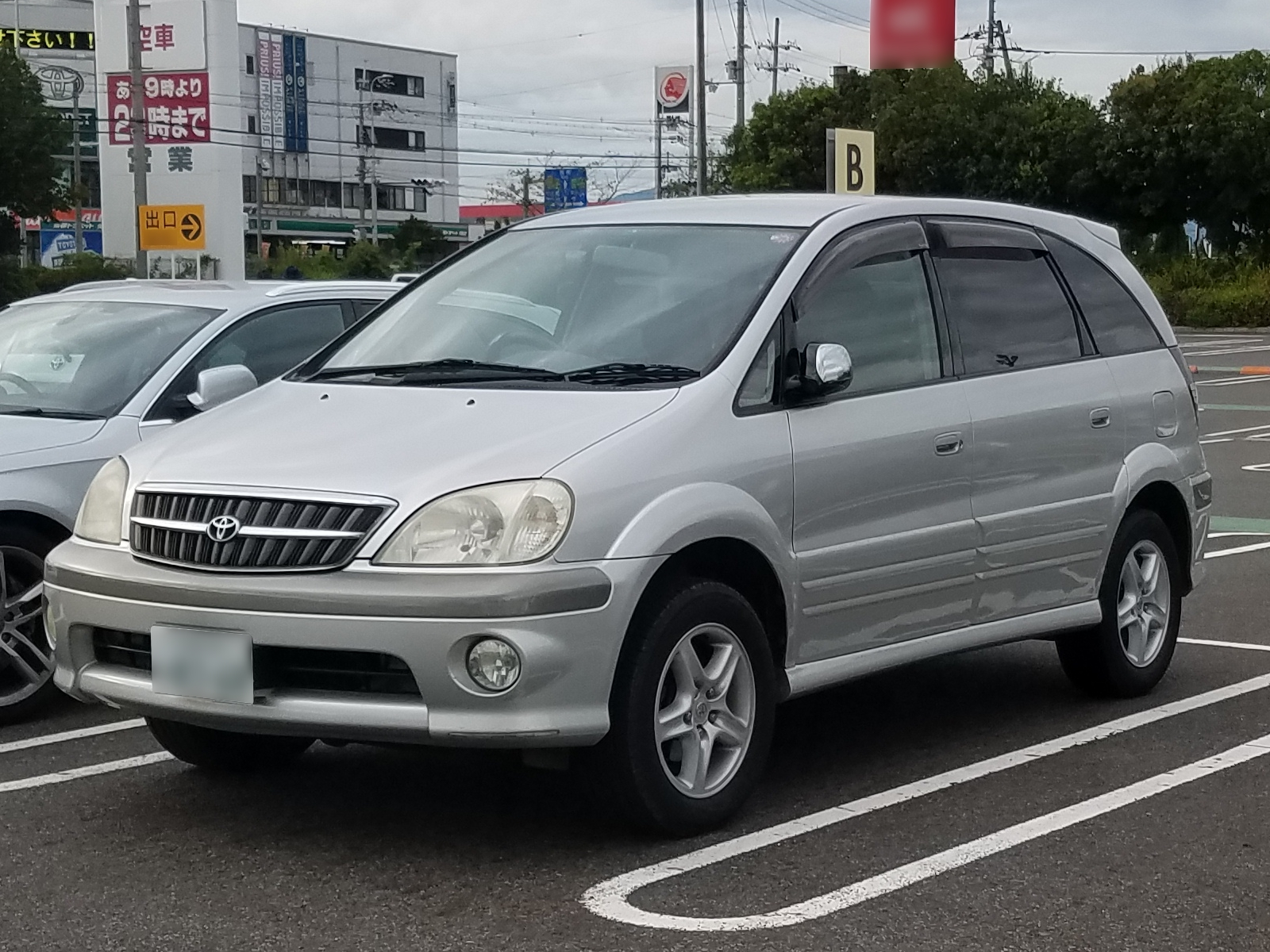
2001–2003 Toyota Nadia type SU S

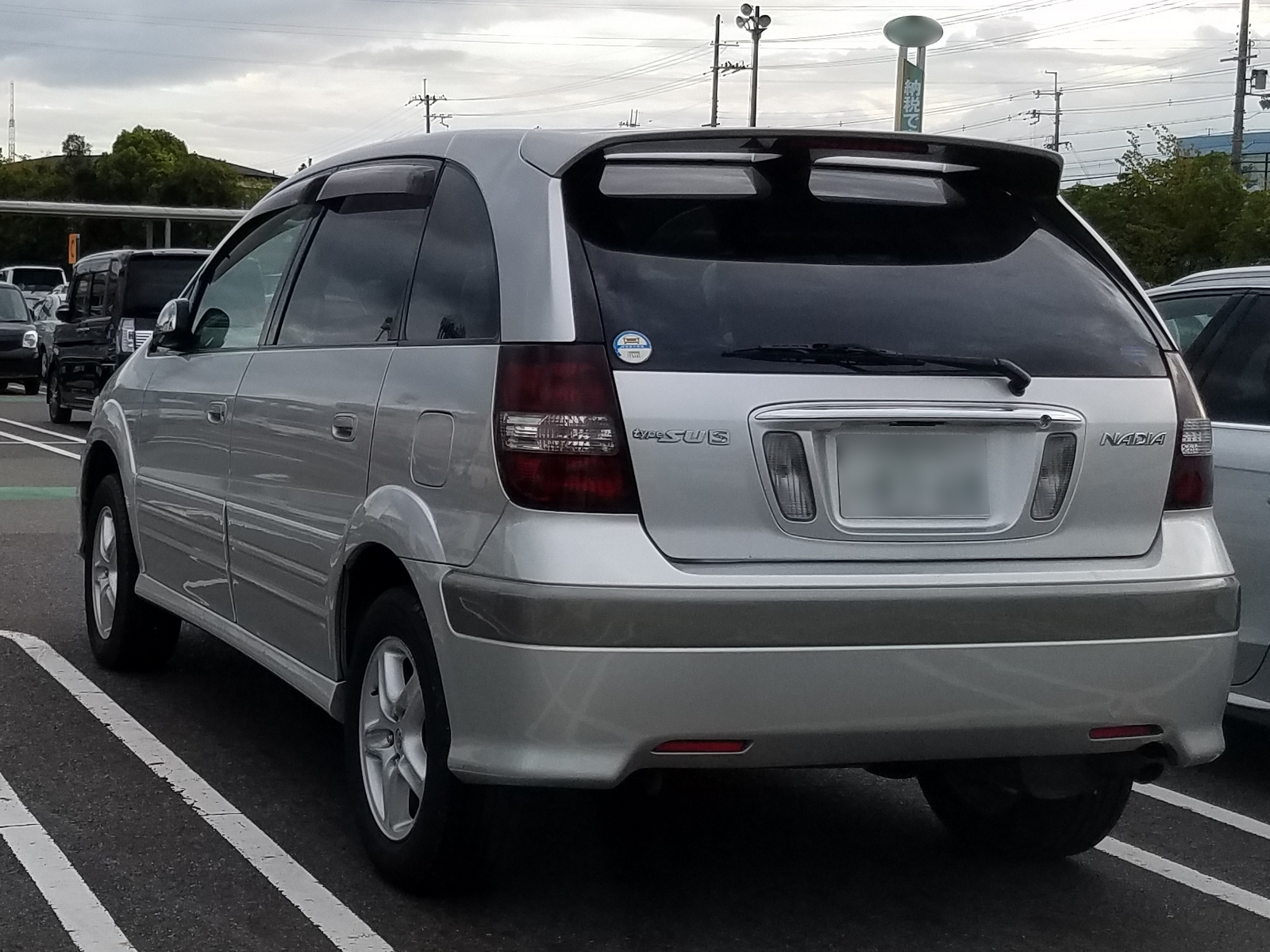
2001–2003 Toyota Nadia type SU S

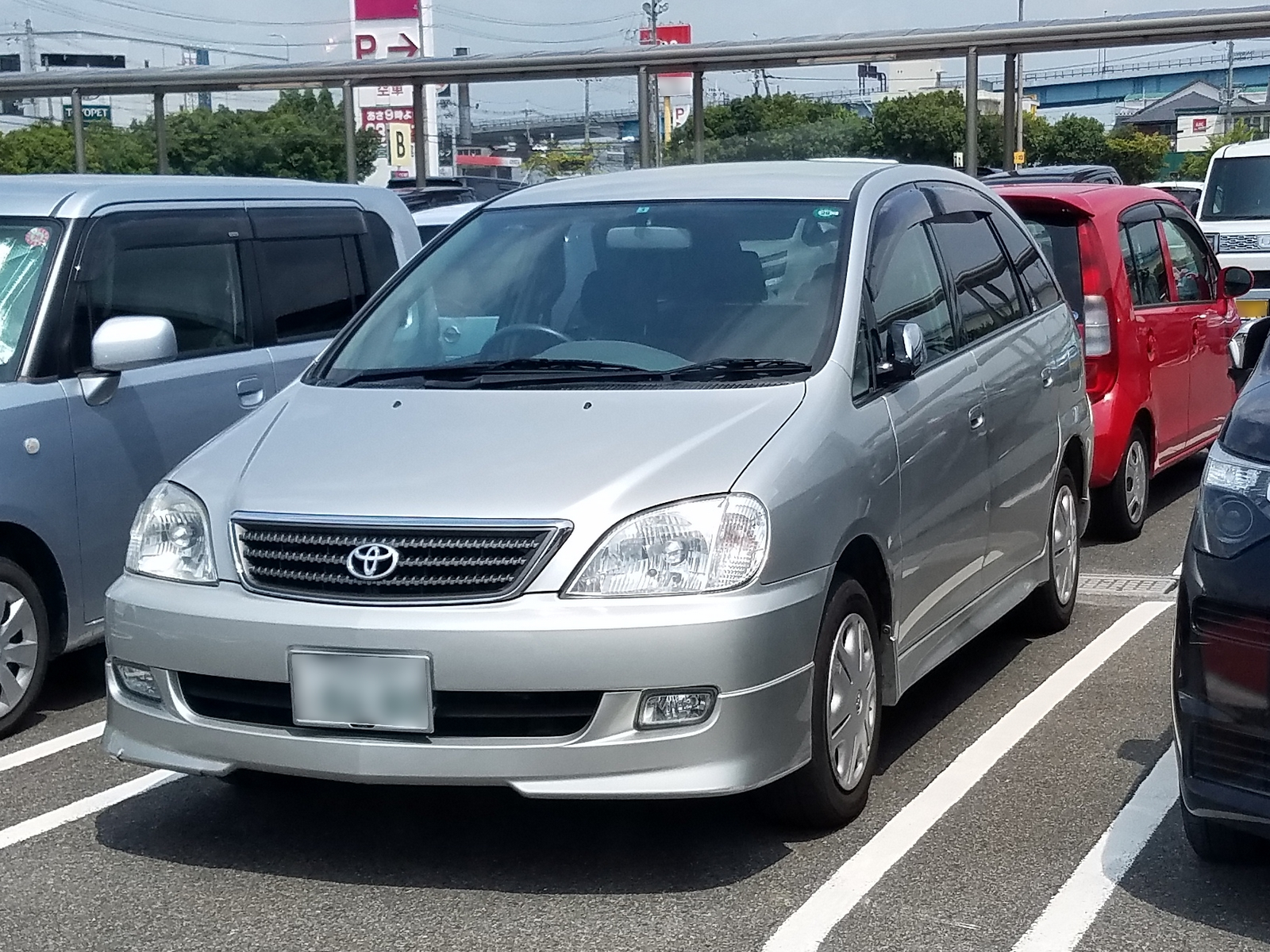
2001–2003 Toyota Nadia (facelift)

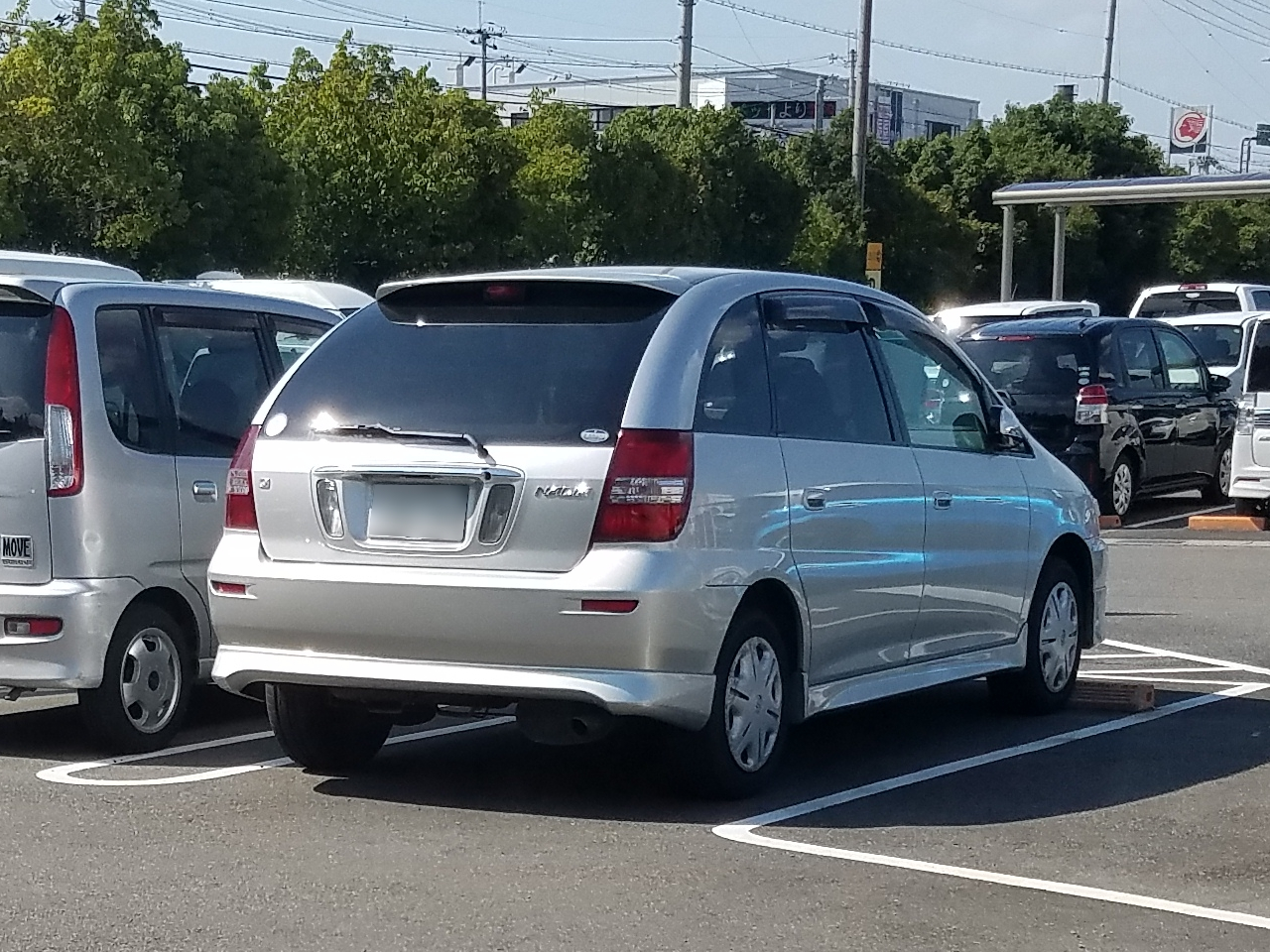
2001–2003 Toyota Nadia (facelift)

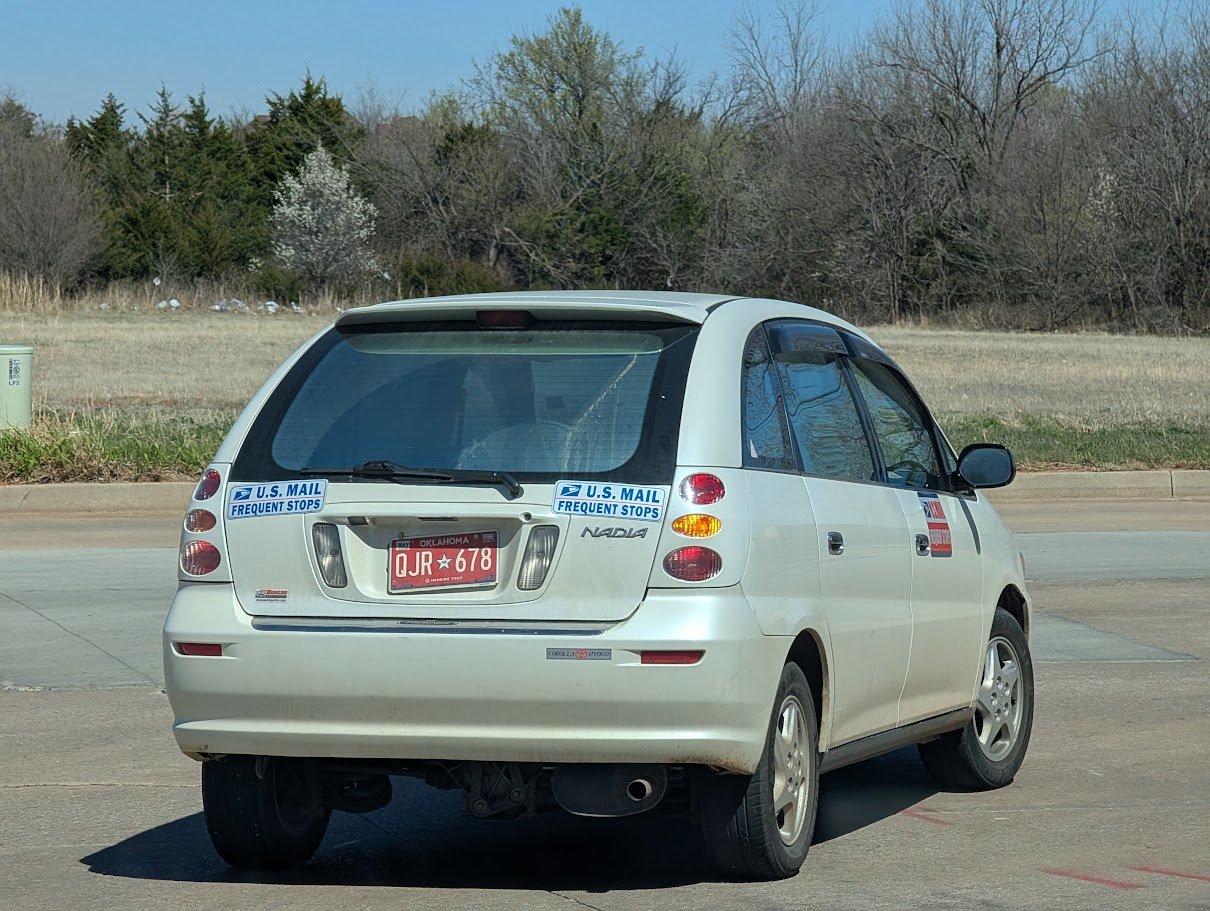
Toyota Nadia imported to Yukon, Oklahoma, US for mail carrier use
