= Toyota AZ engine =

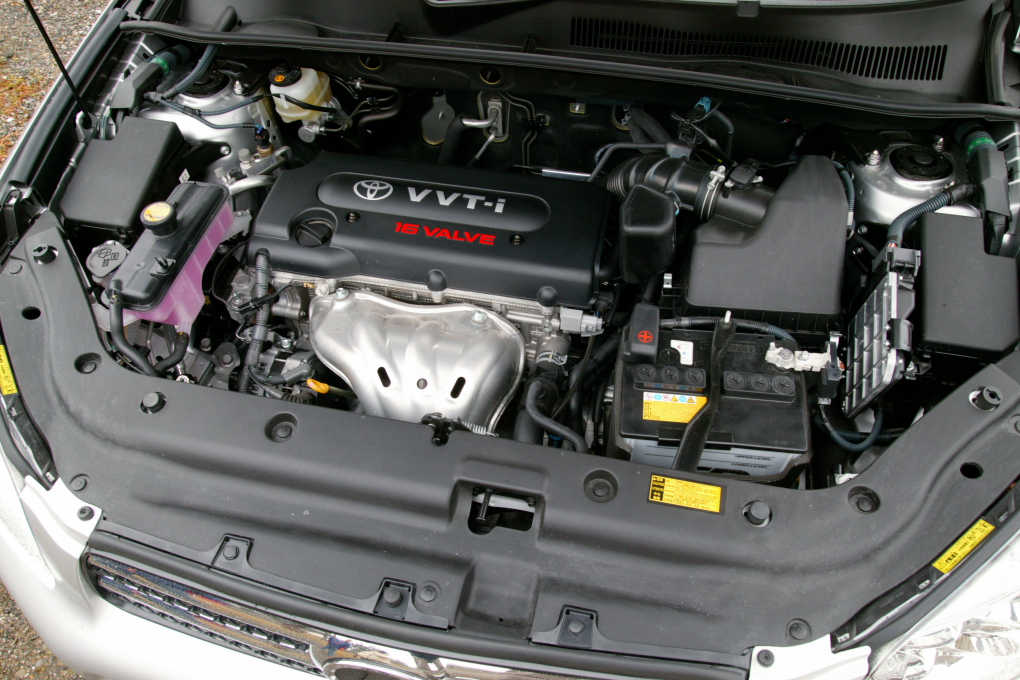
- 2AZ-FE engine

Overview
- Manufacturer: Toyota Motor Corporation
- Production: 2000–2019

Layout
- Configuration: Straight-4
- Displacement: 2.0 L (1,998 cc); 2.4 L (2,362 cc)
- Cylinder bore: 86 mm (3.39 in); 88.5 mm (3.48 in)
- Piston stroke: 86 mm (3.39 in); 96 mm (3.78 in)
- Cylinder block material: Aluminium
- Cylinder head material: Aluminium
- Valvetrain: DOHC 4 valves x cyl. with VVT-i
- Compression ratio: 9.6:1, 9.8:1, 11.0:1, 12.5:1

RPM range
- Max. engine speed: 6500

Combustion
- Supercharger: TRD (on 1st gen Scion tC and 2nd gen xB only)
- Fuel system: Sequential MPFI; D-4 direct injection
- Fuel type: Gasoline
- Cooling system: Water-cooled

Output
- Power output: 145–240 hp (108–179 kW)
- Torque output: 190–325 N⋅m (140–240 lb⋅ft)

Dimensions
- Length: 626 mm (24.6 in)
- Width: 608 mm (23.9 in)
- Height: 681 mm (26.8 in)

Chronology
- Predecessor: Toyota S engine
- Successor: Toyota AR engine

The Toyota AZ engine family is a straight-4 piston engine series. The AZ series uses an aluminium engine block with cast iron cylinder liners and aluminium DOHC cylinder head. The engine series features many advanced technologies including slant-squish combustion chambers, offset cylinder and crank centers, and the VVT-i continuously variable intake valve timing system. The aluminium engine measures 626 mm (24.6 in) long, 608 mm (23.9 in) wide, and 681 mm (26.8 in) tall.

The cylinder block is an open-deck, midi-skirt die-cast aluminium type with cast-in iron liners and a die-cast aluminium lower crankcase and a stamped oil pan. The forged steel crankshaft is fully balanced with eight counterweights and supported by five main bearings. A helical gear pressed in No. 3 counterweight drives twin contra-rotating balance shafts in the shaft housing within the lower crankcase.

The dual overhead camshafts are driven by a single-stage roller chain of 8 mm (0.31 in) pitch, enabling a narrow included valve angle of 27.5°. The camshafts act on four valves per cylinder via bucket tappets. As in the recent Toyota engine practice, no clearance adjusting shim is employed. Valve diameters are 34 mm (1.3 in) for intake and 29.5 mm (1.16 in) for exhaust, with 8 mm (0.31 in) lift for both intake and exhaust. The four-vane VVT-i device is fitted on the intake camshaft, altering timing by 50°. The valve cover is made of magnesium to save weight.

Fuel is injected sequentially via an ultra-fine-atomization injector with twelve small injection holes, each 0.18 mm (0.0071 in) in diameter. As in the smaller NZ engine, the new AZ adopts a plastic, built-up, and vibration-welded intake manifold integrating a large volume plenum chamber (3.5 L (210 cu in) volume including a 1.3 L (79 cu in) resonator). Exhaust manifolds are of tubular construction with integrated catalytic converters.

The AZ is the replacement for the S engine. Its successor is the AR engine.

== Excessive oil consumption ==
The 2AZ-FE engine in certain Camry, Rav4, and Corolla models may burn excessive oil. Pursuant to a lawsuit, Toyota offered warranty extensions to mitigate the problem. The campaign ended on October 31, 2016.

Toyota service would perform a free oil consumption test to determine if the engine was affected. To qualify for repair, all of the following must apply:

- Burning more than 1 US quart (946 ml) of oil in 1,200 miles (1,931 km)
- Has less than 150,000 miles (241,402 km)
- Is less than 10 years old
- Is located in the U.S.

There were approximately 1,715,200 vehicles covered by this Warranty Enhancement Program. A similar campaign was also done in Japan by Toyota in 2014.

== 1AZ ==
The 1AZ line of engines have 2.0 L (1,998 cc) of displacement.

=== 1AZ-FE ===
The 1AZ-FE is a 2.0 L (1,998 cc) version. Output is 108 kW (145 hp) at 6000 rpm with 190 N⋅m (140 lb⋅ft) of torque at 4000 rpm for the Camry Aurion version. Rav4 and Ipsum engines were rated at 148–150 hp (110–112 kW) at 6000 rpm and 142 lb⋅ft (193 N⋅m) of torque at 4000 rpm.

The 1AZ has a total displacement of 2.0 L (1,998 cc) with 86 mm × 86 mm (3.39 in × 3.39 in) bore and stroke, and a compression ratio of 9.6:1.

Applications:
- 2002-2006 Toyota Camry (Southeast Asian/Taiwanese version)
- 2006–2009 Toyota Camry (Aurion version)
- 2000–2003 Toyota RAV4
- 2003-2006 Toyota RAV4 Euro
- 2001–2009 Toyota Ipsum
- 2004–2008 Toyota Wish (Southeast Asian/Taiwanese version)

=== 1AZ-FSE ===
The 1AZ-FSE is a 2.0 L (1,998 cc) version. Bore and stroke is 86 mm × 86 mm (3.39 in × 3.39 in), and a compression ratio of 11.0:1. Output is 149 PS (110 kW; 147 hp) at 5700 rpm with 196 N⋅m (145 lb⋅ft) of torque at 4000 rpm. The 1AZ-FSE features Toyota's D-4 direct injection system.

Applications:
- 2000-2003 Toyota Avensis T220 (facelift)
- 2003-2008 Toyota Avensis T250
- Toyota Avensis Verso
- Toyota Noah/Voxy
- Toyota RAV4
- Toyota Gaia
- Toyota Isis
- Toyota Ipsum
- Toyota Caldina
- Toyota Wish
- Toyota Nadia
- Toyota Allion
- Toyota Premio
- Toyota Opa

== 2AZ ==
The 2AZ line of engines have 2.4 L (2,362 cc) of displacement.

=== 2AZ-FE ===
The 2AZ-FE is a 2.4 L (2,362 cc) version built in Japan (Kamigo Plant and by Toyota Industries Corporation), at TMMK in the US and also built in China for select Scion xB models, and also in Australia, obtains a total displacement of 2.4 L (2,362 cc) with 88.5 mm × 96 mm (3.48 in × 3.78 in) bore and stroke, with a compression ratio of 9.6:1. Output is 160 hp (119 kW) at 5600 rpm; 220 N⋅m (162 lb⋅ft) of torque at 4000 rpm.

Later versions of the 2AZ-FE engine were upgraded with 9.8:1 compression ratio, a slightly more aggressive intake cam profile, 6500 rpm redline, and piston oil squirters. These later versions are rated at 161 hp (120 kW) in the Scion tC, 177 hp (132 kW) in the RAV4, and 158 hp (118 kW) in the Camry, Corolla XRS, Scion xB, and 177 hp (132 kW) for the Previa/Estima/Alphard.

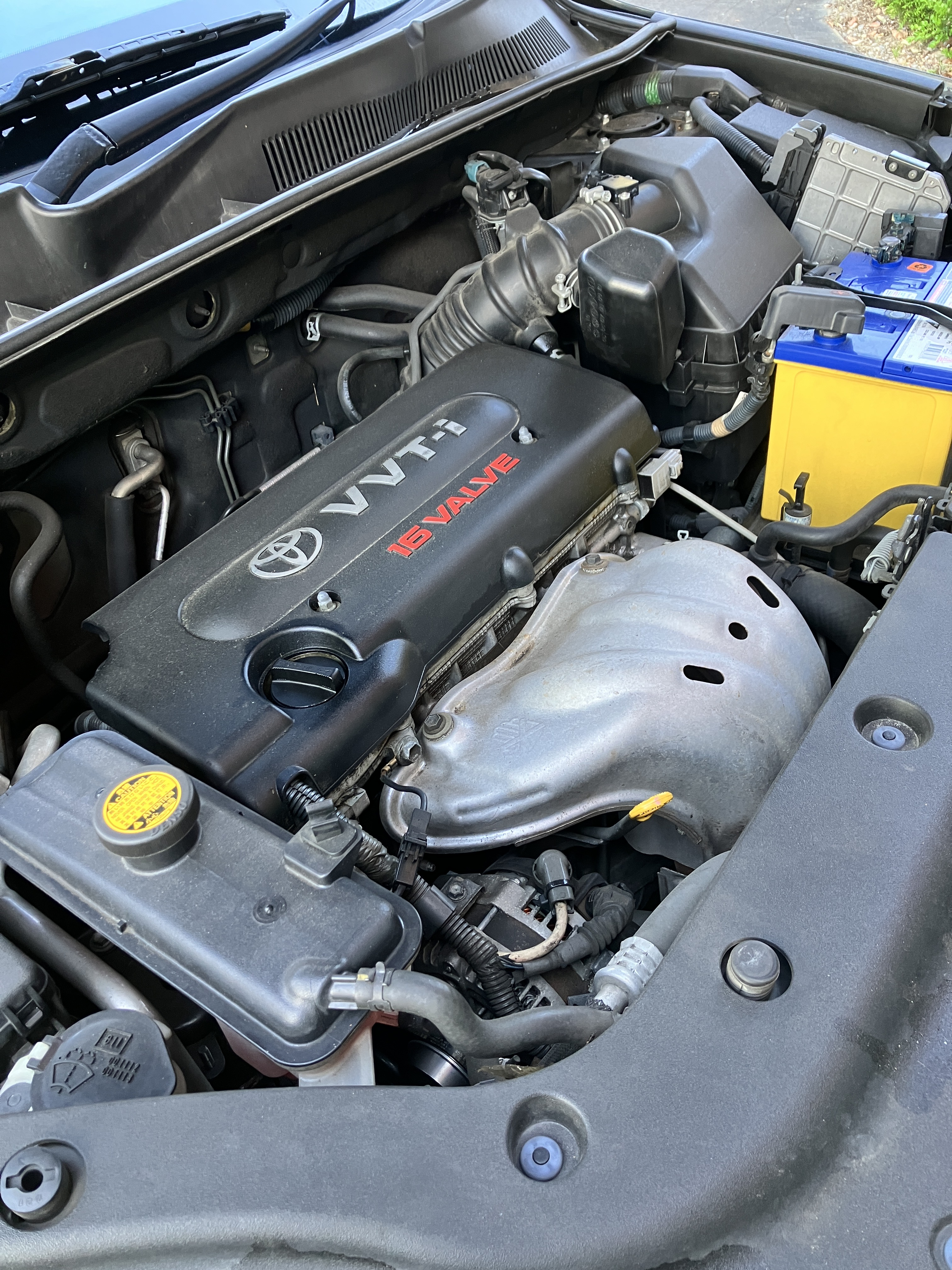
Photo of the 2AZ-FE engine used in a Toyota RAV4 2007

Some Japan-made Toyota vehicles with the 2AZ-FE engine were equipped with the K112 transmission also referred to as 7-speed Super CVT-i automatic (Seven-speed Sequential Shiftmatic) from October 2005.

However, these later 2AZ-FE models were the first to be rated under the new SAE J1349 standard. The new standard usually produces more conservative numbers, though no definitive comparison is available since the two versions were never tested by the same standard. The RAV4 uses a different timing chain cover from the Camry, they can however be interchanged.

A TRD supercharger was available for the Scion tC and 2nd generation xB until Spring 2009.

There have been complaints of this engine "burning oil" in North America from the 2006 model year onwards, with the issue starting after 45,000 miles (72,000 km), though mostly after 60,000–75,000 miles (97,000–121,000 km). Piston ring design has been identified as a potential problem. Toyota has issued a TSB (Technical service bulletin) TSB #0094-11 in August 2011 but has not issued a recall. Alternative theories point to a head gasket problem: the 2AZ-FE aluminum block threads may wear out on the back three middle bolts (closest to firewall). Check TSB SB-0015-11.

There are several class-action lawsuits underway regarding this issue. In January 2015, Toyota North America issued extended warranty notification (ZE7) for this issue for Toyota North America vehicles only.

Applications:
- 2002–2011 Toyota Camry in Australia. ACV40R
- 2009–2011 Toyota Matrix S (USA)/XR (Canada)/XRS
- 2009–2010 Pontiac Vibe
- 2009–2010 Toyota Corolla XRS (2011-2013 only in Mexico and in Canada)
- 2002–2008 Toyota Camry Solara
- 2004–2012 Toyota RAV4
- 2000–2007 Toyota Highlander/Kluger
- 2000−2013 Toyota Harrier
- 2000-2019 Toyota Estima / Toyota Previa / Toyota Tarago
- 2001-2010 Toyota Ipsum
- 2002−2015 Toyota Alphard
- 2008−2015 Toyota Vellfire
- 2006−2012 Toyota Blade
- 2003-2009 Toyota Avensis
- 2005–2010 Scion tC
- 2008–2015 Scion xB
- 2007-2013 Toyota Mark X ZiO

=== 2AZ-FSE ===
The 2AZ-FSE is a 2.4 L (2,362 cc) version. Bore and stroke is 88.5 mm × 96 mm (3.48 in × 3.78 in), and a compression ratio of 11.0:1. Output is 163 PS (120 kW; 161 hp) at 5800 rpm with 231 N⋅m (170 lb⋅ft) of torque at 3800 rpm. The 2AZ-FSE features Toyota's D-4 direct injection system.

Applications:
- Toyota Avensis

=== 2AZ-FXE ===
The 2AZ-FXE is an Atkinson cycle variant of the 2AZ-FE. It has the same bore and stroke, but the intake cam and pistons are unique. It has a physical compression ratio of 12.5:1.

The longer than normal open intake valve duration leads to a reduction in cylinder charge and reduced torque and power output, but efficiency is increased. This combination makes the 2AZ-FXE suitable for use only in hybrid vehicles, where peak torque and power demands can be met by the electric motor and battery.

Maximum output when used in the Camry hybrid is 187 hp (139 kW; 190 PS) at 6000 rpm with 257 N⋅m (190 lb⋅ft) of torque at 4400 rpm.

Applications:
- 2003–2014 Toyota Alphard Hybrid
- Toyota Estima Hybrid
- 2007–2011 Toyota Camry Hybrid AHV40
- 2010–2014 Lexus HS 250h
- 2009–2017 Toyota Sai

== 3AZ ==
The 3AZ line of engines have 2.4 L (2,362 cc) of displacement.

=== 3AZ-FXE ===
The 3AZ-FXE is an Atkinson cycle engine which is always paired to an electric motor in a hybrid system. This engine is an analogue of the 2AZ-FXE which is for the Chinese market only.

Applications:
* 2010 Toyota Camry Hybrid AHV40 (China)

== See also ==
- List of Toyota engines
