= Toyota Ipsum =

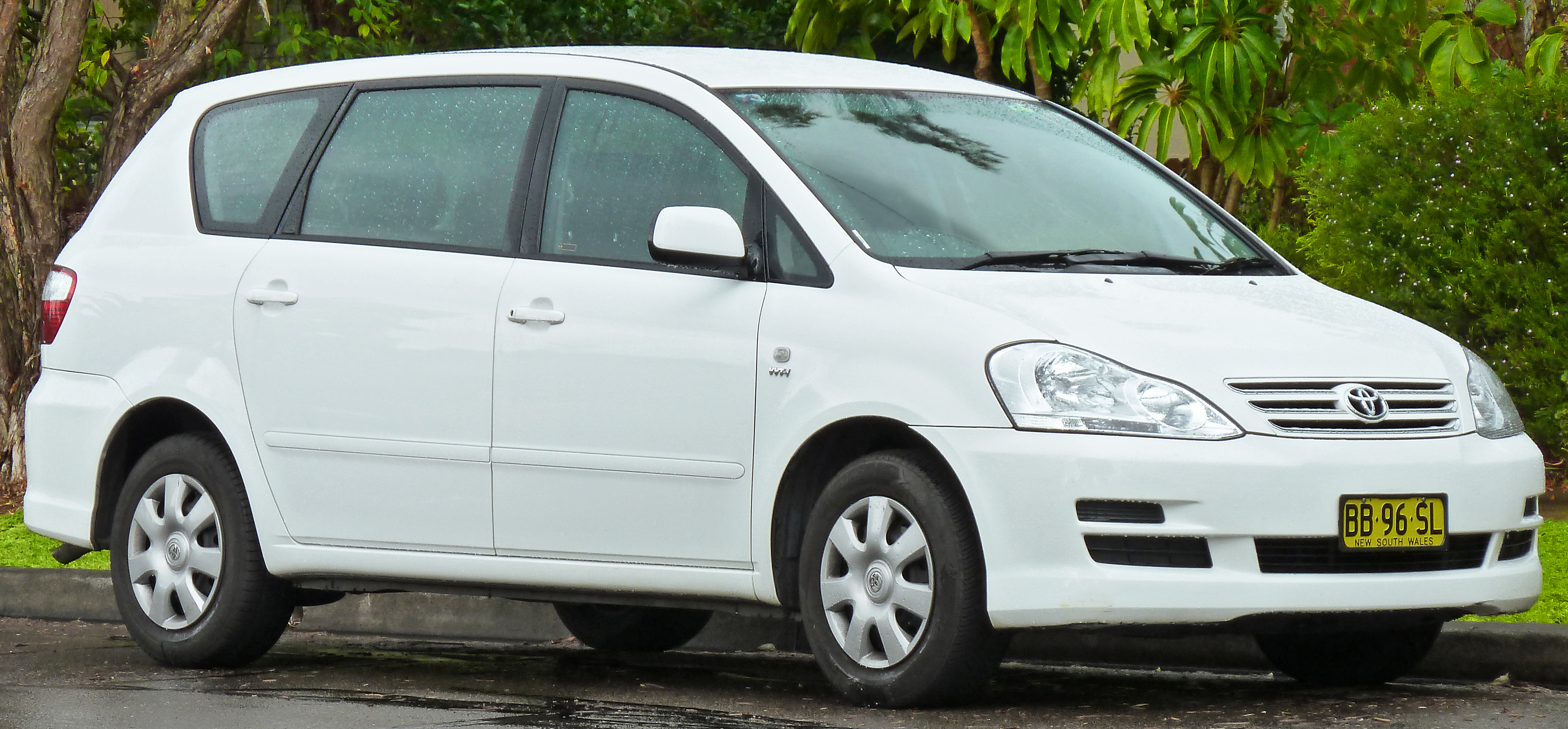
- 2003–2010 Toyota Avensis Verso GLX (ACM21R, Australia)

Overview
- Manufacturer: Toyota
- Also called: Toyota Sportsvan (Denmark); Toyota Picnic (Singapore and Hong Kong); Toyota Avensis Verso
- Production: 1995–2010

Body and chassis
- Class: Compact MPV
- Layout: Front-engine, front-wheel-drive
- Related: Toyota Avensis

Chronology
- Successor: Toyota Verso (Europe)

The Toyota Ipsum, Picnic, or Avensis Verso is a car produced by the Japanese carmaker Toyota from 1995 to 2010. It is a compact MPV with standard three-row seating. The Ipsum, like many Toyota products, was shared as a trio of the Toyota Gaia, and sold only at Japanese Toyota dealerships called Toyota Store, next to the Toyota Carina. The Gaia was unique to Toyopet Store locations, and the Toyota Nadia was sold at Toyota Corolla Store.

== First generation (XM10; 1995) ==
First generation (XM10)
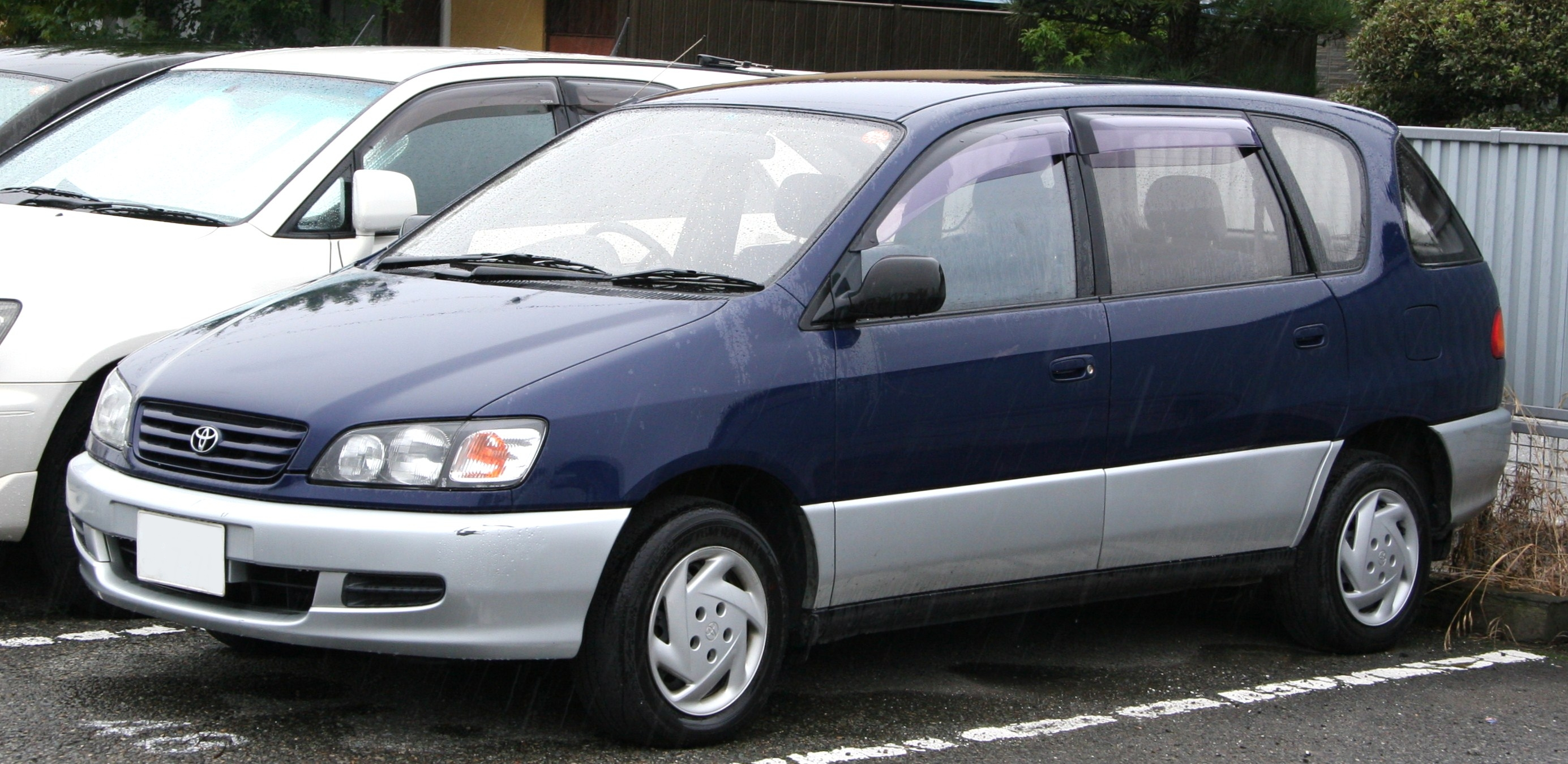
- Toyota Ipsum (pre-facelift)

Overview
- Also called: Toyota Picnic; Toyota Avensis Picnic; Toyota SportsVan (Denmark)
- Production: May 1995 – 2001
- Assembly: Japan: Toyota City, Aichi (Motomachi plant); Kariya, Aichi (Toyota Auto Body)

Body and chassis
- Related: Toyota Avensis (T220); Toyota Caldina (T210); Toyota Carina (T210); Toyota Corona (T210); Toyota Gaia; Toyota Nadia

Powertrain
- Engine: Petrol: 2.0 L 3S-FE I4; Diesel: 2.2 L 3C-TE turbo I4
- Transmission: 5-speed manual; 4-speed automatic

Dimensions
- Wheelbase: 2,735 mm (107.7 in)
- Length: 4,530 mm (178.3 in)
- Width: 1,695 mm (66.7 in)
- Height: 1,620 mm (63.8 in)

The first generation, named Ipsum in Japan and Picnic in export markets, was built from May 1995 until 2001, with export versions arriving in 1996. A commercial version was sold as the Toyota SportsVan in Denmark. It had a choice of two straight-four engines, either a petrol unit displacing 2.0-litres or a 2.2-litre turbo-diesel engine, the 3C-TE. The Ipsum was Toyota's first real success in Japan's then-new "RV" (Recreational Vehicle) market segment. The initial sales target of 10,000 units per month was exceeded by nearly fifty percent in the car's first few months on the market.

The petrol engine produces 135 or 128 PS (99 or 94 kW) in Japanese or European specifications, while the turbo-diesel has 90 PS (66 kW) on tap.

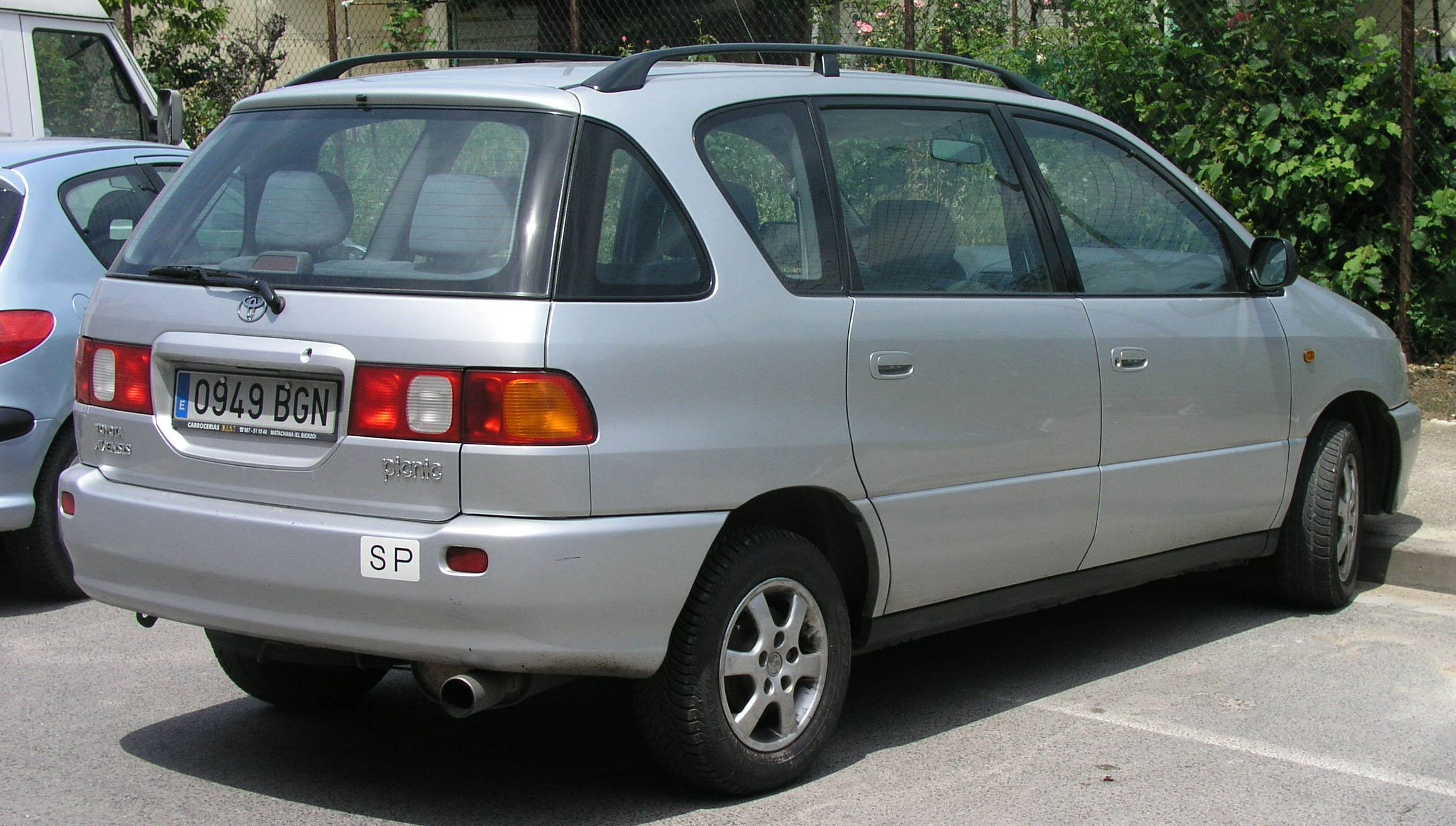
Toyota Avensis Picnic (pre-facelift)

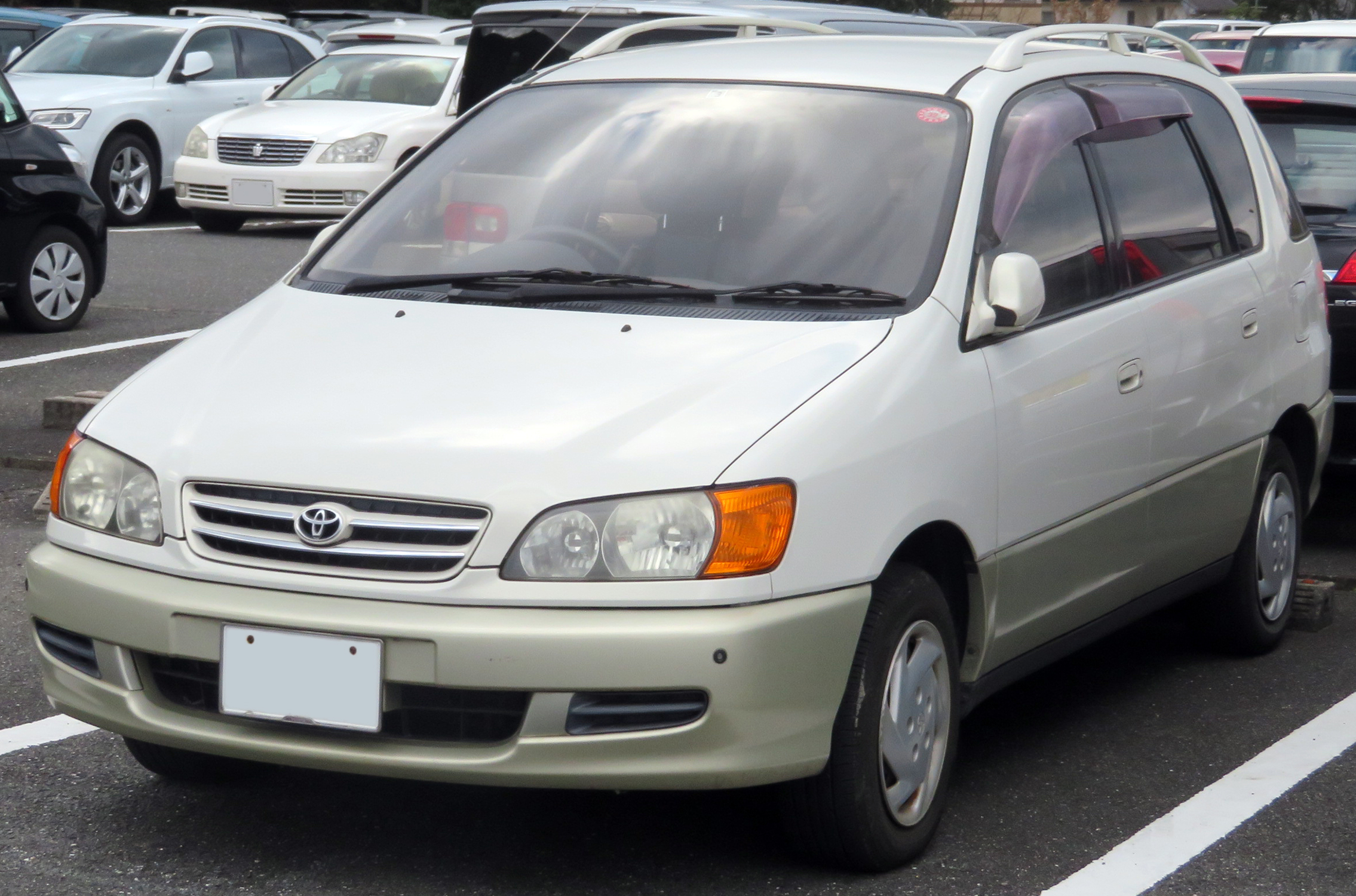
Ipsum L-Selection (facelift)

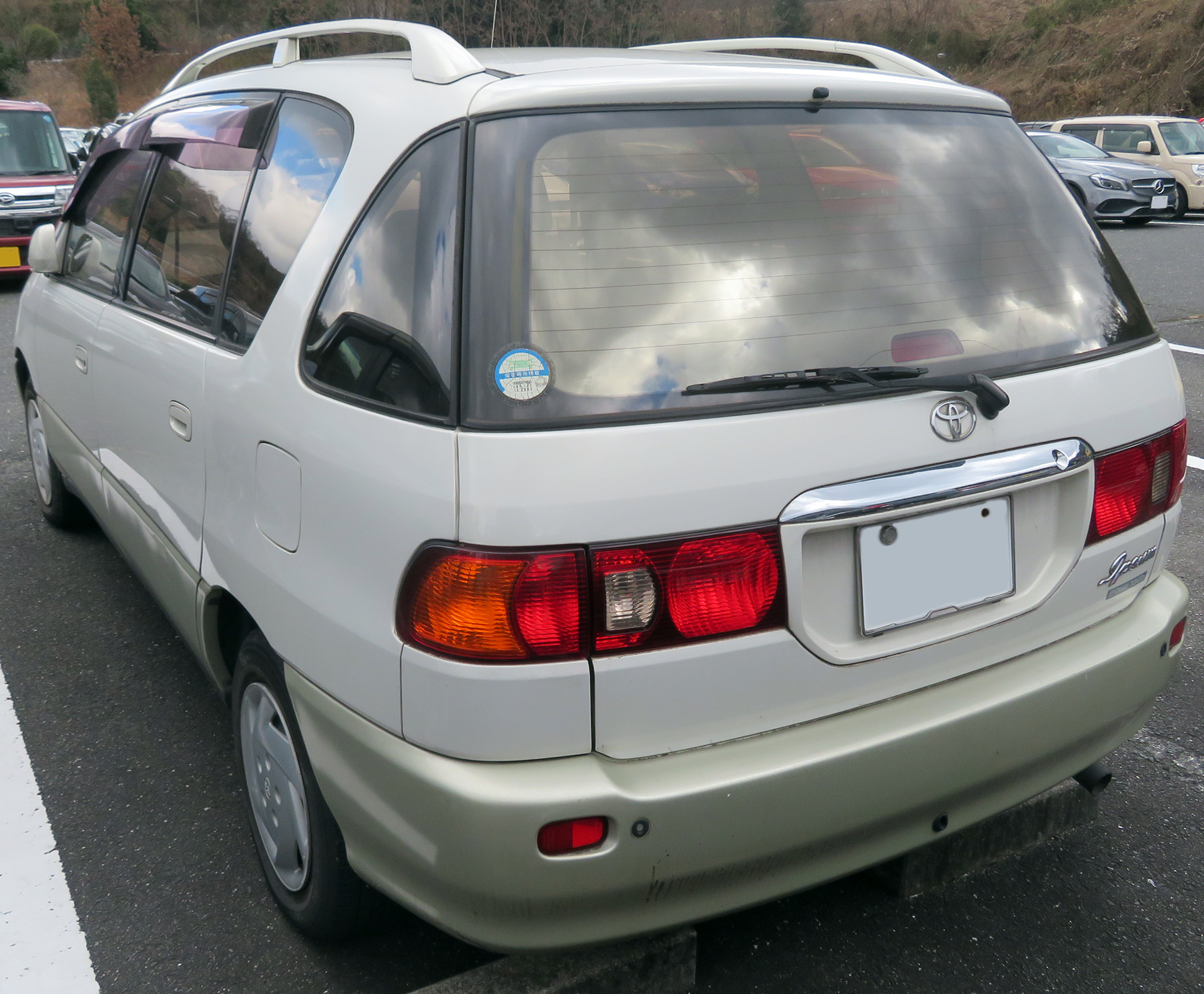
Ipsum L-Selection (facelift)

== Second generation (XM20; 2001) ==
Second generation (XM20)
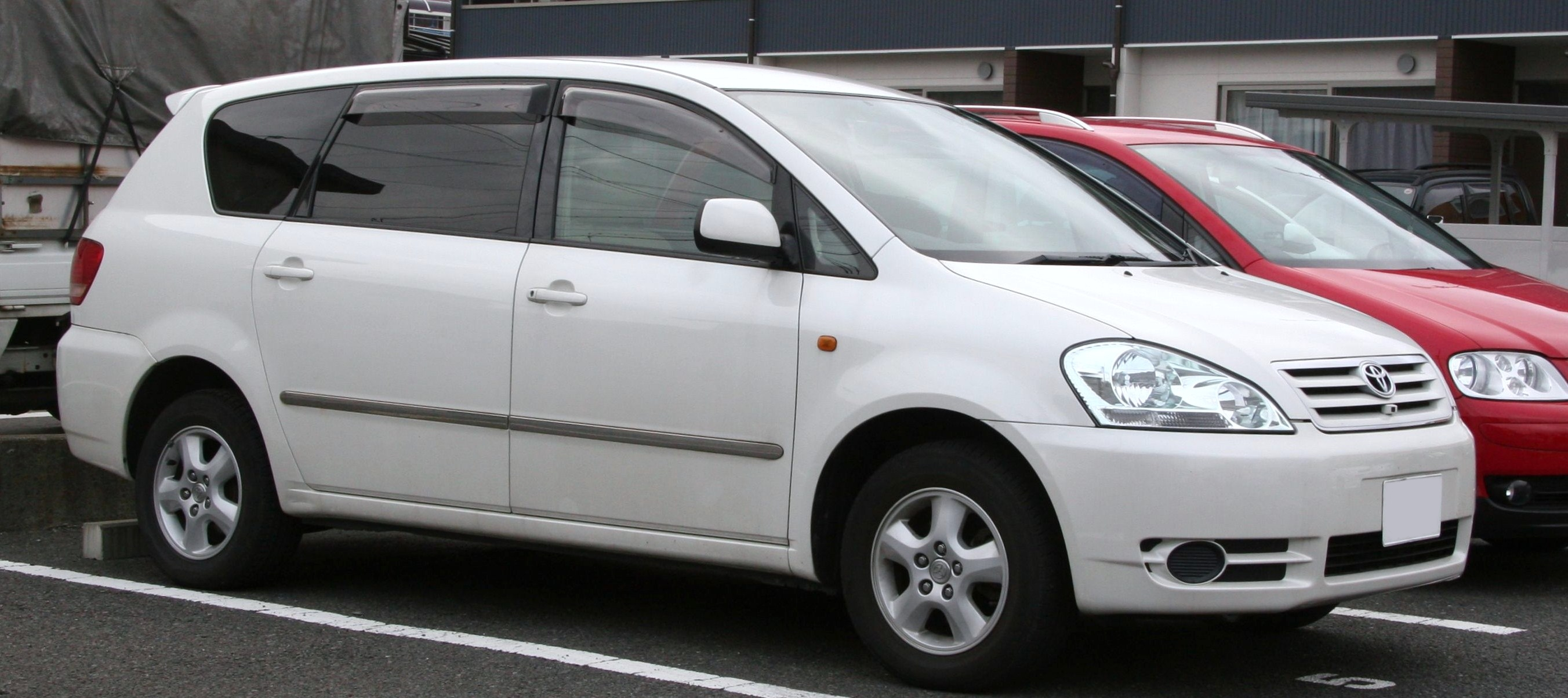
- Ipsum 240 U (ACM21R; pre-facelift, Japan)

Overview
- Also called: Toyota Avensis Verso (Europe, Australia, and New Zealand); Toyota Picnic (Singapore and Hong Kong); Toyota SportsVan (Denmark)
- Production: 2001–2010
- Assembly: Japan: Tahara, Aichi (Tahara plant); Kariya, Aichi (Toyota Auto Body)

Body and chassis
- Platform: Toyota MC platform
- Related: Toyota Avensis (T250); Toyota Noah (R60)

Powertrain
- Engine: Petrol: 2.0 L 1AZ-FE I4; 2.0 L 1AZ-FSE I4; 2.4 L 2AZ-FE I4; Diesel; 2.0 L 1CD-FTV turbo I4
- Transmission: 5-speed manual; 4-speed automatic

Dimensions
- Wheelbase: 2,825 mm (111.2 in)
- Length: 4,690 mm (184.6 in)
- Width: 1,760 mm (69.3 in)
- Height: 1,675 mm (65.9 in)
- Curb weight: 1,490–1,540 kg (3,284.9–3,395.1 lb)

The second generation was introduced in May 2001 in Japan and also in Europe and Australia (where it was marketed as the Avensis Verso).

The car is known as the Toyota Picnic in some markets, including Singapore and Hong Kong. Apart from Japan, the Ipsum was also available (for Malaysia and Singapore). The commercial "SportsVan" model continued to be available in Denmark; after the Ipsum/Picnic was discontinued Toyota Denmark applied the SportsVan name to a commercial version of the Toyota Verso (R20).

It features an enlarged wheelbase, rear air conditioners and inner room for seven seats. There is also an optional roof rack that provides ability to carry outdoor equipment. The seats can be pushed forward and flat for various configurations.

Engine options included a 2.0-litre 1AZ-FE petrol engine producing 150 PS (110 kW), a 2.4-litre 2AZ-FE petrol engine and a 2.0-litre 1CD-FTV D-4D turbo-diesel engine producing 116 PS (85 kW).

It received its facelift in October 2003, featuring a redesigned front and rear bumper, headlamps, new LED tail lamps and high mount stop lamp, interior trim and new alloy rims.

In Australia, the Avensis Verso was available from 2001 to 2010 and was back-to-back winner of Australia's Best People Mover award in 2002 and 2003. There were two models, the 2001–2003 ACM20R and the 2003–2010 ACM21R and both came in two trim levels, the base GLX and the Ultima with upgraded interior trim and roof rails. The ACM20R model came in 3 variants with all having the 2.0 L 1AZ-FE engine. The GLX was available with either a 4-speed automatic or a 5-speed manual transmission while the Ultima was only available with the 4-speed automatic. The 2004 model ACM21R arrived with a minor facelift and an upgraded 2.4 L 2AZ-FE engine. Both the GLX and Ultima variants were now only available with the 4-speed automatic.

The Avensis Verso was discontinued in Europe in 2005. Production of the Ipsum ended in December 2009, and it was discontinued in Japan on the following month. Exports of the Avensis Verso to Australia continued until 2010.

Pre-facelift

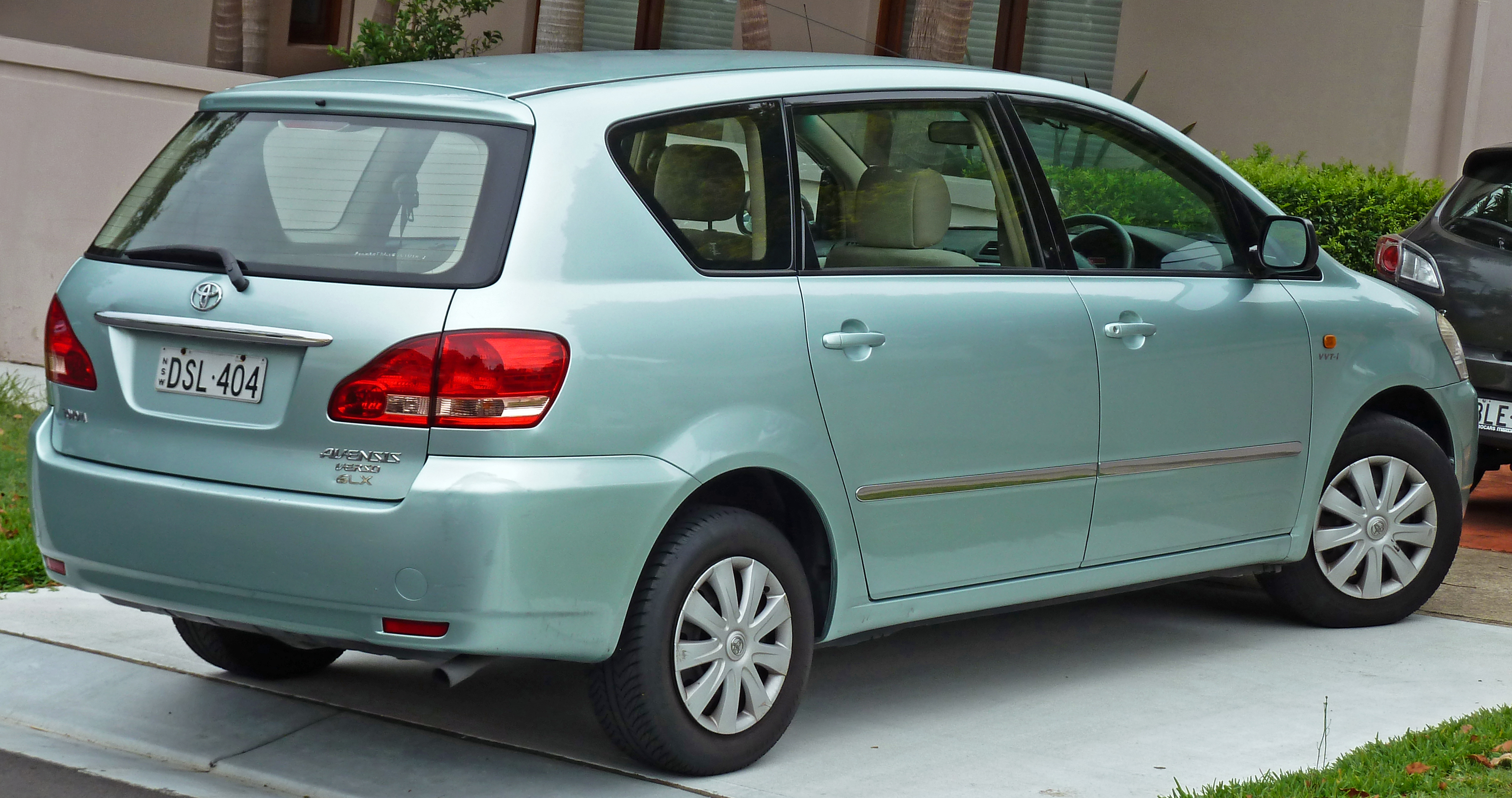
Avensis Verso GLX (ACM20R, Australia)

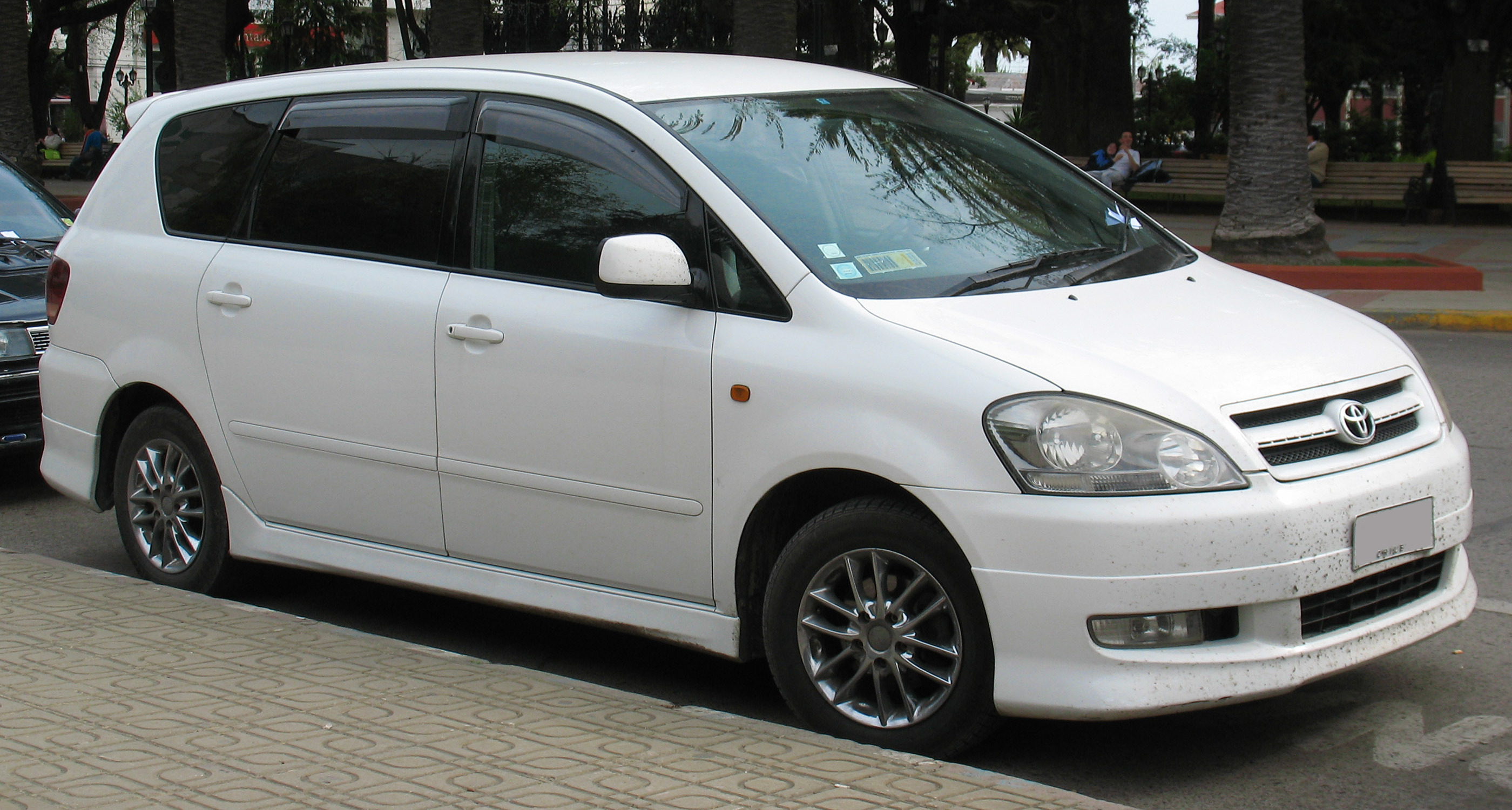
Ipsum 240 S (ACM21R)

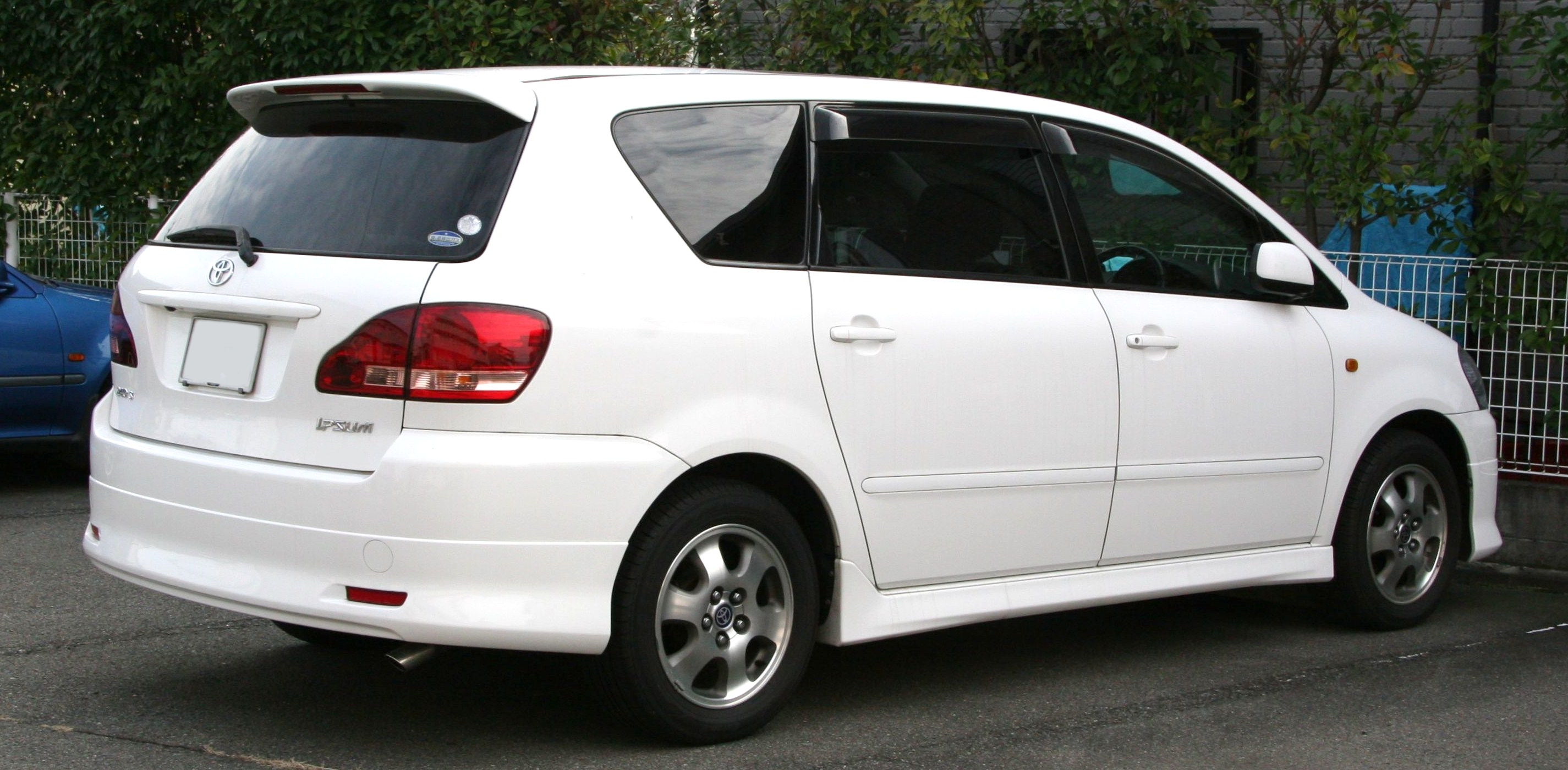
Ipsum 240 S (ACM21R, Japan)

Facelift

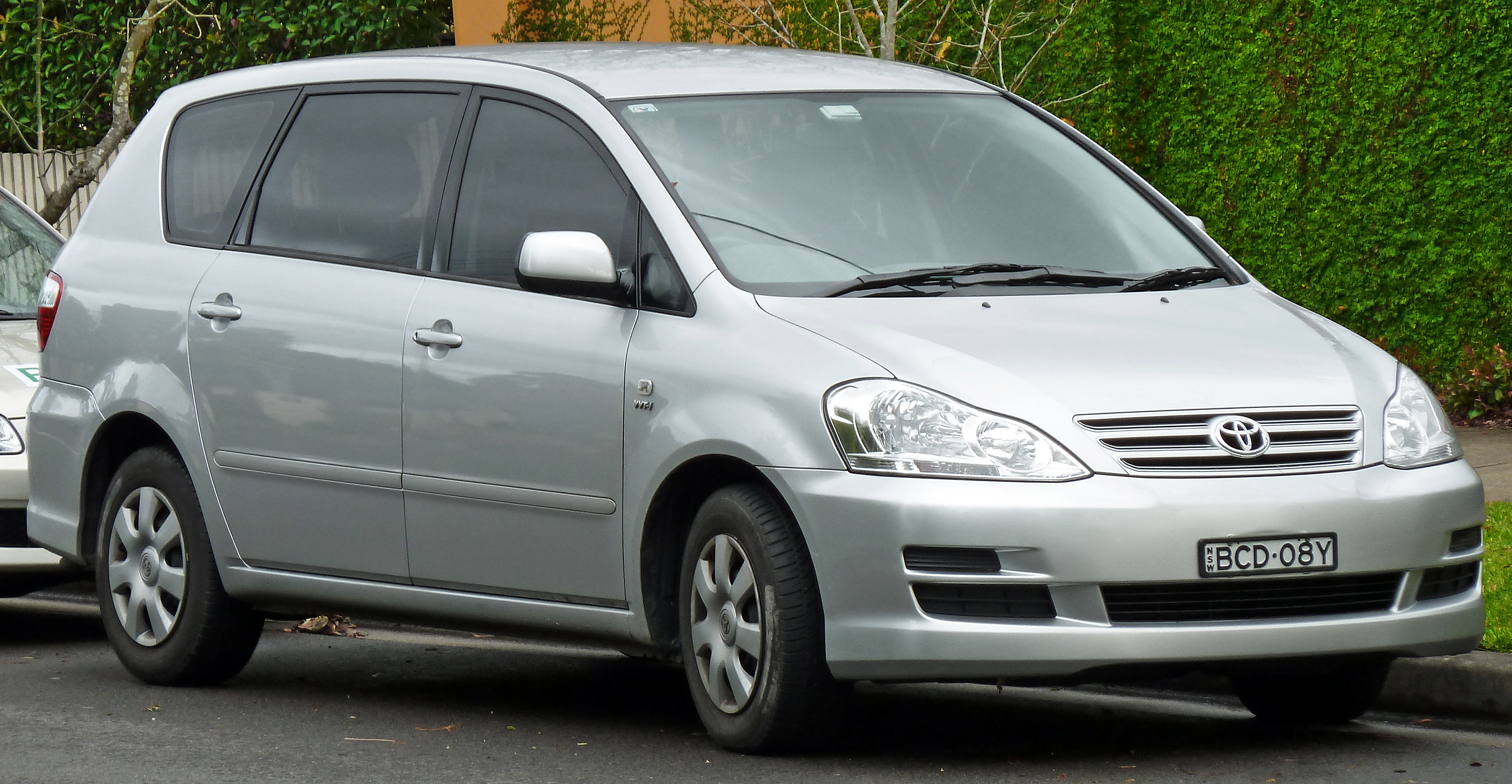
Avensis Verso GLX (ACM21R, Australia)

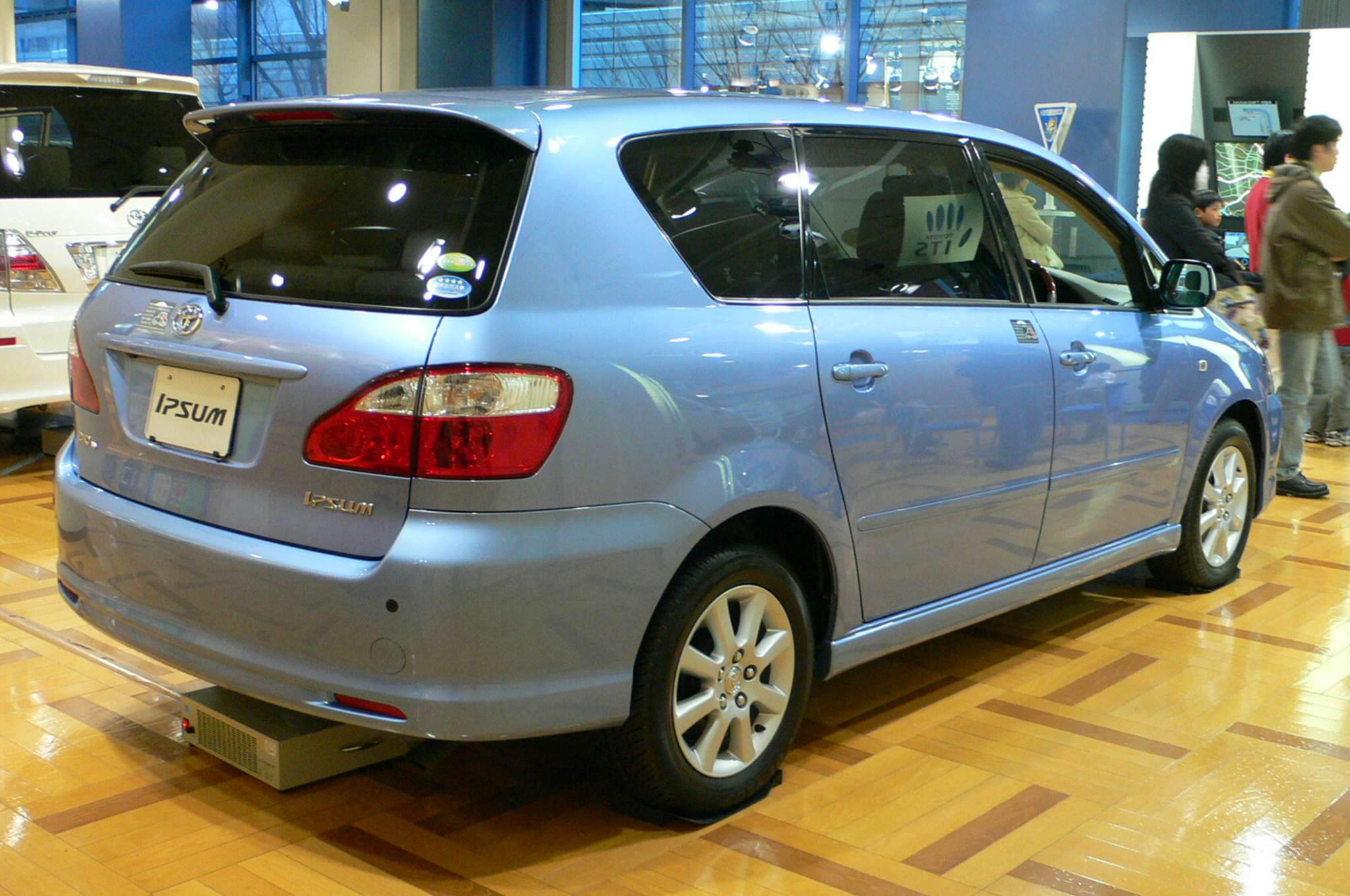
Ipsum 240 U (ACM21R, Japan)

== See also ==
- List of Toyota vehicles
