= Toyota dealerships (Japan) =

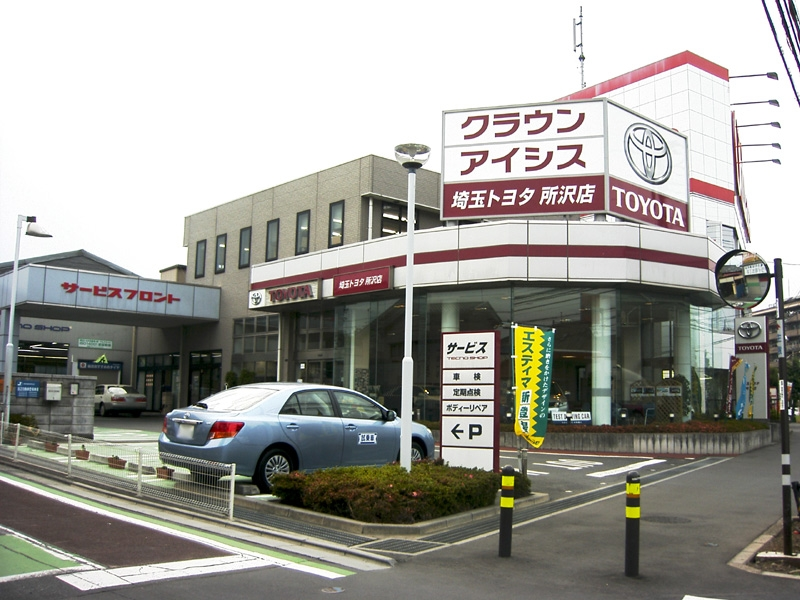
Toyota Store Saitama

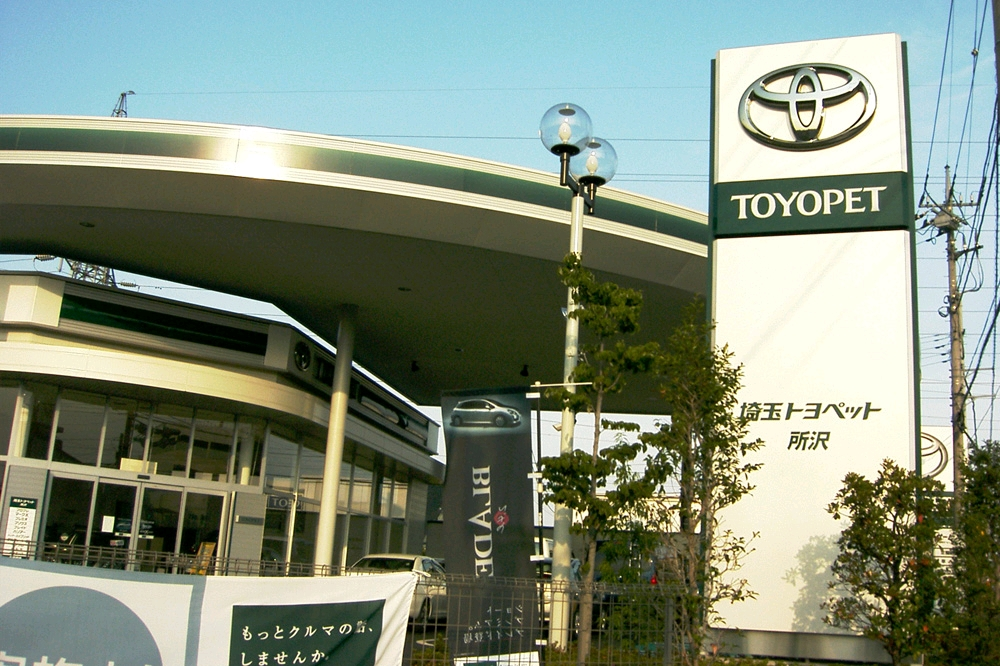
Toyopet Store, Saitama

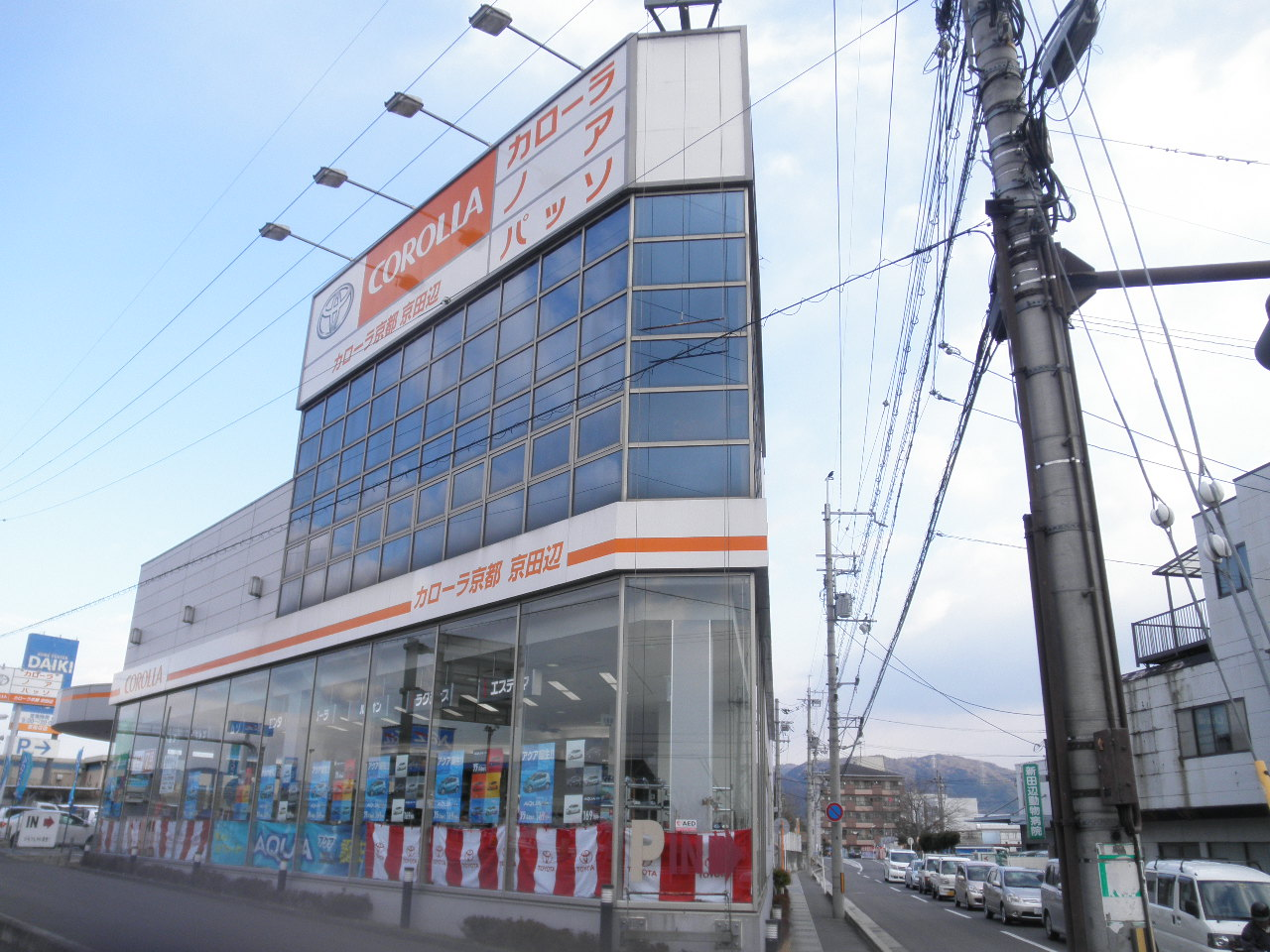
Corolla Store Kyotanabe

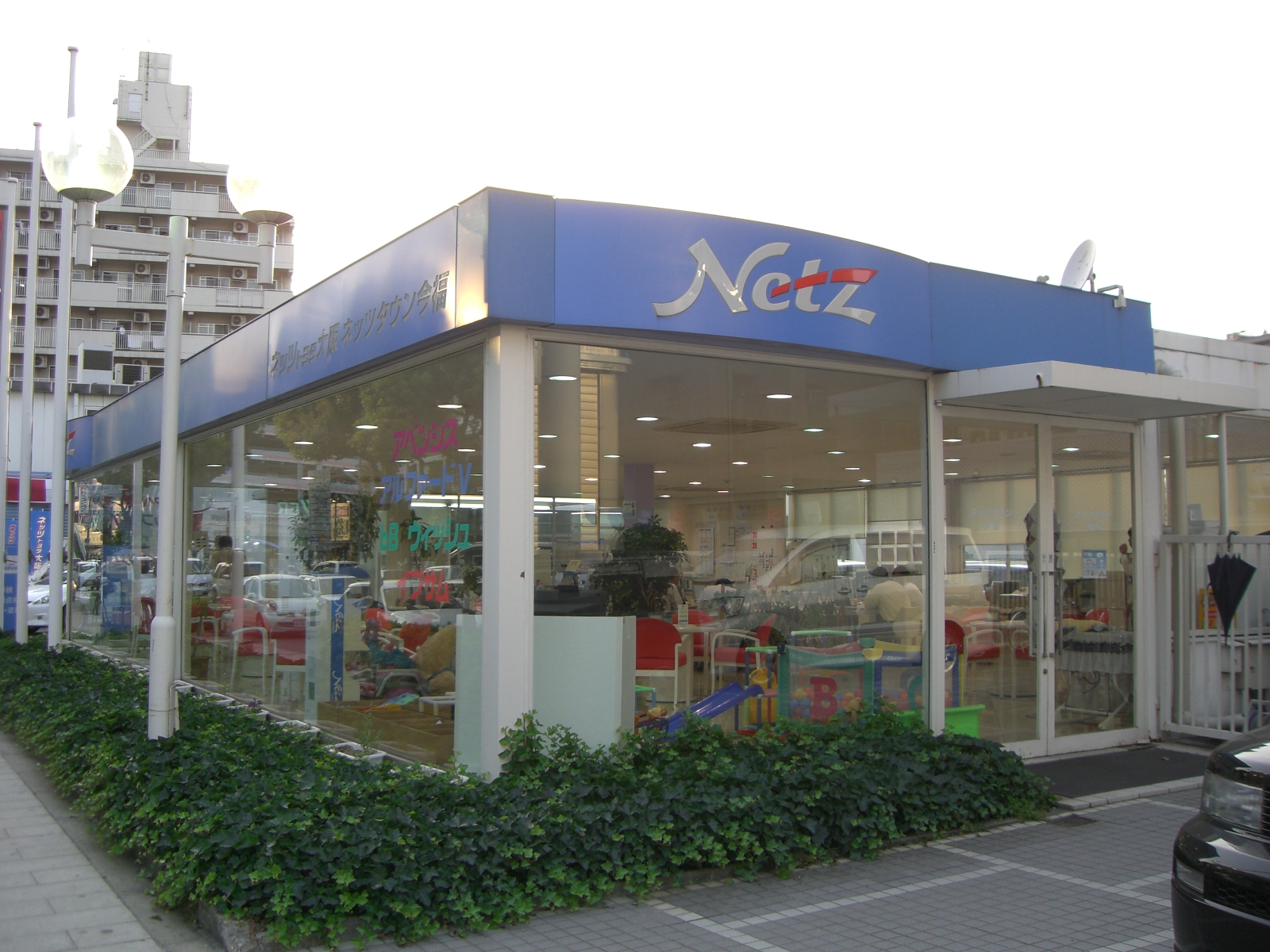
Netz Store, Tsurumi-ku, Osaka

Toyota vehicles in Japan are distributed to numerous dealership chains throughout the country. Up to May 2020, each dealership chain had a different product offering, with some models restricted to one chain to maintain exclusivity. Since May 2020, every Toyota model in Japan was available in all dealership chains. Current dealership chains include Toyota Store, Toyopet Store, Toyota Corolla Store and Netz Store.

== History ==
In Japan in the late 1940s, Toyota's sales department was part of its manufacturing company and had its office in Nagoya.

At that time, the Japanese auto industry was controlled by the U.S. government. The majority of Toyota's sales was composed of trucks and buses. The new car business in Japan was quite limited. There was little need for consumer-oriented branding or consumer-oriented showrooms.

On April 3, 1950, Toyota established a separate company for sales of its motor vehicles, including exports, called トヨタ自動車販売株式会社 Toyota Jidōsha Hanbai Kabushiki Gaisha, Toyota Auto Sales Corporation, sometimes abbreviated トヨタ自販 Toyota Jihan. In 1950, there were forty-seven sales outlets for Toyota vehicles in Japan.

In 1955, Toyota launched a new style of sedan, the Crown.

In 1957, Toyota began manufacturing a slightly smaller and more economical sedan, the Corona. A separate sales network, Toyopet Stores (トヨペット店 Toyopetto-ten), was created to sell the Corona and Toyopet ToyoAce trucks. To offer a Crown-sized luxury sedan, the Mark II was offered.

To distinguish Crown showrooms from Corona showrooms, the former came to be called Toyota Stores (トヨタ店 Toyota-ten). In the 1960s, Toyota Stores added a new luxury car, the Century. In the 1970s the Carina was added as a vehicle between the Corolla and the Corona.

In 1957, Toyota launched Toyota Diesel Stores (トヨタディーゼル店 Toyota Dīzeru-ten), a dealership network for diesel commercial vehicles that initially sold trucks, buses, and forklifts, such as the Dyna and Coaster. Hino products were likewise sold at Diesel Stores after Toyota acquired that company in 1967. Starting in 1980, Diesel Stores sold the Starlet, Corolla, Corona, Vista, Mark II, and Crown equipped with diesel engines, as well as the first-generation Tercel, although it was not available with a diesel engine at the time. When the Toyota Diesel store network was disbanded in 1988, commercial vehicles were divided between Toyota Stores and Toyopet Stores.

Toyota Publica Stores (トヨタパブリカ店 Toyota Paburika-ten) were established in 1961 to sell the Publica. In 1966, the chain of outlets was renamed Toyota Corolla Store" (トヨタカローラ店 Toyota Karōra-ten) to offer the Corolla, followed by the sports hardtop and liftback Celica and the Supra.

The "Toyota Auto Stores" (トヨタオート店 Toyota Ōto-ten) sales network was established in 1967 to sell a Corolla clone called the Sprinter. In the 1970s the Chaser and the LiteAce added more choices. "Toyota Vista Stores" (トヨタ・ビスタ) sales network was established in 1980, and a Camry and sister car called the Vista was developed in 1982.

Toyota Auto Stores were rebranded as NETZ Store (ネッツトヨタ店 Nettsu-Toyota-ten) ("Network of Energetic Teams for Zenith"), targeting young buyers, in August 1998. Toyota Vista Stores was subsequently merged into NETZ Toyota in April 2004. Some former NETZ Store models, such as the Altezza, were rebranded as Lexus (レクサス Rekusasu). At the same time, other products were taken over by NETZ Store, which was already selling the ist and the RAV4. One of its distinctive characteristics is the use of the Netz logo on the front, instead of the Toyota logo.

In 2012, selected Japanese dealerships were given a special designation, Area 86, that resembled the North American Toyota network, called Scion, to sell the 86, building on the marketing approach started with WiLL-branded products. As of 2017, the Area 86 network was rebranded as GR for Gazoo Racing, sharing a similar approach to the performance division Toyota Racing Development (TRD), providing various upgrades for the 86, Vitz, Prius, Mark X, Harrier, Noah and Voxy.

In the idol group, AKB48, Toyota and AKS have worked together to create a subunit named Team 8, which was marketed with the slogan: "Idols who come to meet you." They have a total of 47 members, each representing a prefecture of Japan.

In the Tokyo, vehicle exclusively at a particular dealer system was abolished on 1 April 2019, faster than other prefectures, and all Toyota models are handled by Toyota Mobility Tokyo' (トヨタモビリティ東京 Toyota Mobiriti Tōkyō) .

On 24 June 2019, Toyota announced that they leave the vehicle exclusively at a particular dealer for almost 60 years. Starting May 2020, all vehicles that were previously exclusive to certain dealers were available in all dealership chains. Consequently, in Japan a customer can purchase any Toyota new from any of the four dealership groups, while Lexus products remain exclusive to Lexus locations.

== List of models sold in the retail channels ==
The following is a list of models that used to be available to certain dealerships. The discontinued models are identified with a ☆ while the present models are identified with a ★. Most of the present models can now finally be found in every store from all dealership groups since May 2020 (April 2019 in Tokyo) due to Toyota's Unification Strategy. Exceptions like the Century are labelled with an ◎.

Some cars appear in more than one dealership list (e.g. the Toyota Prius shows up in the car list of all four dealerships). This is because such cars were already available in more than one dealership.

=== Toyota Store ===

Vehicles sold at Toyota Store:

Century★◎, Crown Majesta☆, Crown★, Master☆, SAI☆, Mirai★, Prius★, Aqua★, Allion☆, Succeed☆, Blade☆, Avensis☆, Sienta★, Corolla RunX☆, C-HR☆, Porte☆, Estima☆, Isis☆, Roomy★, Raize★, FJ Cruiser☆, Comfort☆, JPN Taxi★, Land Cruiser★, Hilux Surf★, Land Cruiser Prado★, Dyna★, Stout☆, Esquire☆, Coaster★, 2000GT☆, Carina☆, Carina ED☆, GR86★, Brevis☆, Gaia☆, Cavalier☆, Classic☆, MasterAce☆, Hilux★, Mega Cruiser☆, Soarer☆, Origin☆, Caldina☆, AA sedan☆, Toyopet SA☆, G1 series truck☆, FA series truck☆, BX series truck☆.

=== Toyopet Store ===

Previously, the Toyopet, which existed before it became a dealership name, was both a car name and a separate brand from Toyota.

Vehicles sold at Toyopet Store:

Mark X☆, SAI☆, Mirai★, Premio☆, Prius★, Aqua★, Belta☆, Mark X ZiO☆, Succeed☆, Ractis☆, Auris☆, Blade☆, GT-86 (ZN6)☆, Porte☆, Harrier☆, Vanguard (3rd gen RAV4)☆, Esquire☆, Rush☆, C-HR☆, Avensis☆, Alphard★, Comfort☆, HiAce★, ToyoAce☆, Tank☆, Sienta★, Pixis Space☆, Raize★, Mark II☆, Mark II Qualis☆, Mark II Blit☆, Corona☆, Corona EXiV☆, Corona Coupe☆, Corsa☆, Opa☆, Avalon☆, Progrès☆, Cami☆, ist☆, Platz☆, Soarer☆, Hilux★, Cynos☆, Regius☆, Celsior☆, Origin☆, Caldina☆, Ipsum☆.

=== Toyota Corolla Store ===

Vehicles sold at Toyota Corolla Store (starting 1966), formerly Publica Store:

SAI☆, Camry☆, Prius★, Aqua★, Corolla★, Corolla Axio☆, Corolla Fielder☆, GR86★, Belta☆, Spade☆, Probox★, Corolla Rumion☆, C-HR☆, Ractis☆, Passo☆, Raize★, Corolla Spacio☆, Vanguard (3rd gen RAV4)☆, Roomy★, Estima☆, Noah★, Avensis☆, Sienta★, TownAce★, Pixis lineup★, Publica☆, Tercel☆, Windom☆, Scepter Sedan ☆, Corolla Ceres☆, Origin☆, Nadia☆, WiLL☆, RAV4★, Sports 800☆, Celica☆, Supra☆, Corolla Levin☆, Celica XX☆, Celica Camry☆.

=== Netz Store ===

Vehicles sold at Netz Store (starting 1998), Toyota Vista Store (1980–1998), Toyota Auto Store (1967–1998):

Vitz☆, Yaris★, SAI☆, Prius★, Aqua★, ist☆, Auris☆, bB☆, Avensis☆, Raum☆, Spade☆, Wish☆, Voxy★, Raize★, RAV4★, C-HR☆, Kluger☆, Sera☆, Vellfire★, iQ☆, Allex☆, Tank☆, Pixis lineup★, Fun Cargo☆, Pronard☆, Altezza☆, Verossa☆, Curren☆, Aristo☆, MR-S☆, MR2☆, Starlet☆, Vista☆, Cresta☆, Sprinter☆, Voltz☆, Blizzard☆, Chaser☆, Sprinter Marino☆, Carib☆, Granvia☆, Sprinter Trueno☆, LiteAce★, Ipsum☆, GR86★, WiLL (1999–2004)☆.

== See also ==
- Honda automobile dealerships (Japan)
