= Toyota concept vehicles (1935–1969) =

Toyota concept vehicles produced between 1935 and 1969 include:

== A1 (1935) ==
The A1 was made in May 1935 as Toyota's first complete vehicle. It entered production in slightly modified form in 1936 as the AA.

== Sports (1957) ==
Toyota Sports

Overview
- Manufacturer: Toyota
- Production: 1957

Body and chassis
- Class: Sports car
- Body style: 2-door coupe

Powertrain
- Engine: 697 cc

Chronology
- Successor: Toyota Sports 800

The Toyota Sports was a concept vehicle made by Toyota in 1957. It was equipped with a 697 cc engine, and the Toyota Sports X and Toyota Sports 800 were based on it.

== Sports X (1961) ==
The Sports X was a concept car shown at the 1961 Tokyo Motor Show. Styling was similar to Italian show cars of the time, with slim pillars and a light roof. A 1900 cc engine was used with other mechanicals based on the Crown. It was not put into production.

== Airport Limousine (1961) ==
The Airport Limousine was a concept car shown at the 1961 Tokyo Motor Show. Based on the Crown, the Airport Limousine was a 6-door wagon that retained the fins and side panels of the Crown sedan. It had three rows of bench seats, allowed seating for 9 people, plus luggage space in the rear section. The 1900cc 3R engine produced 80 PS (59 kW) at 4600 rpm and 14.5 kg⋅m (142 N⋅m; 105 lbf⋅ft) at 2600 rpm. The Airport Limousine was not put into production.

The similar production Masterline wagon (also based on the Crown) had only 2 doors, 2 rows of bench seats to allow seating for 6 people (plus luggage) and simpler side panels (without fins).

Toyota made another 6 door Airport Limousine based on the Crown in 1977. It also failed to make production.

== X (1961) ==
Toyopet X

Overview
- Manufacturer: Toyopet
- Production: 1961

Body and chassis
- Body style: 4-door Sedan

The Toyopet X is a car made by Toyota in 1961. It is based on the Toyota Crown. It was shown at the 1961 Tokyo Motor Show.

== Publica Sports (1962) ==
Toyota Publica Sports
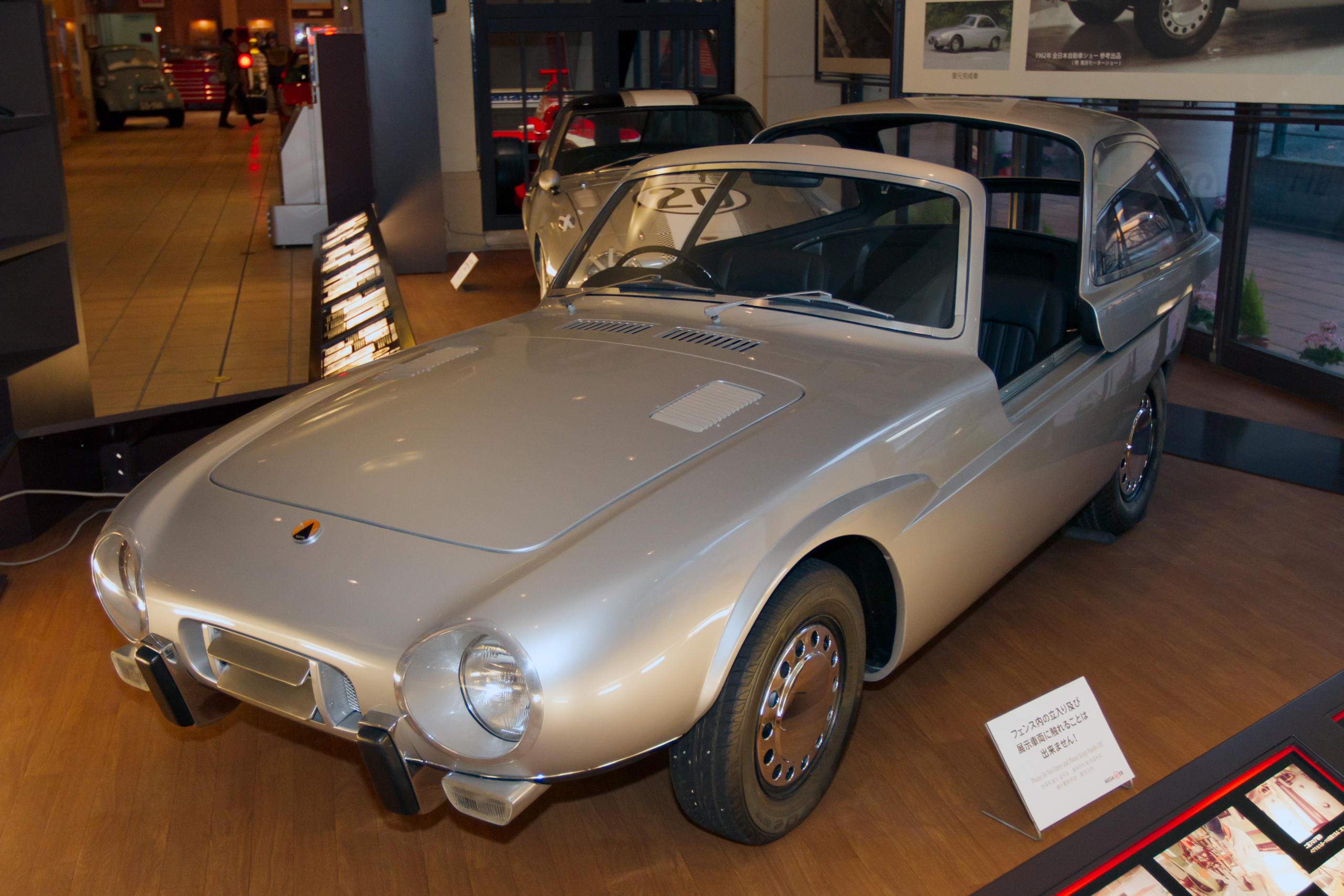

Overview
- Manufacturer: Toyota
- Production: 1962
- Designer: Tatsuo Hasegawa

Body and chassis
- Class: Sports car
- Body style: 1-door coupe
- Layout: Front-engine, rear-wheel-drive
- Doors: Canopy doors

Powertrain
- Engine: 697 cc 2U air-cooled OHV H2

Dimensions
- Length: 3,510 mm (138.2 in)
- Width: 1,454 mm (57.2 in)
- Height: 1,180 mm (46.5 in)
- Curb weight: 690 kg (1,521 lb)

The Toyota Publica Sports was a concept car that was developed from the Publica production car.

The first public viewing was at the 1962 Tokyo Motor Show. It was a strict two-seater with a single sliding canopy for entry and a small but high revving engine, a tuned version of the regular Publica's 2-cylinder boxer engine.

It was further developed into the production Sports 800 but without the sliding canopy.

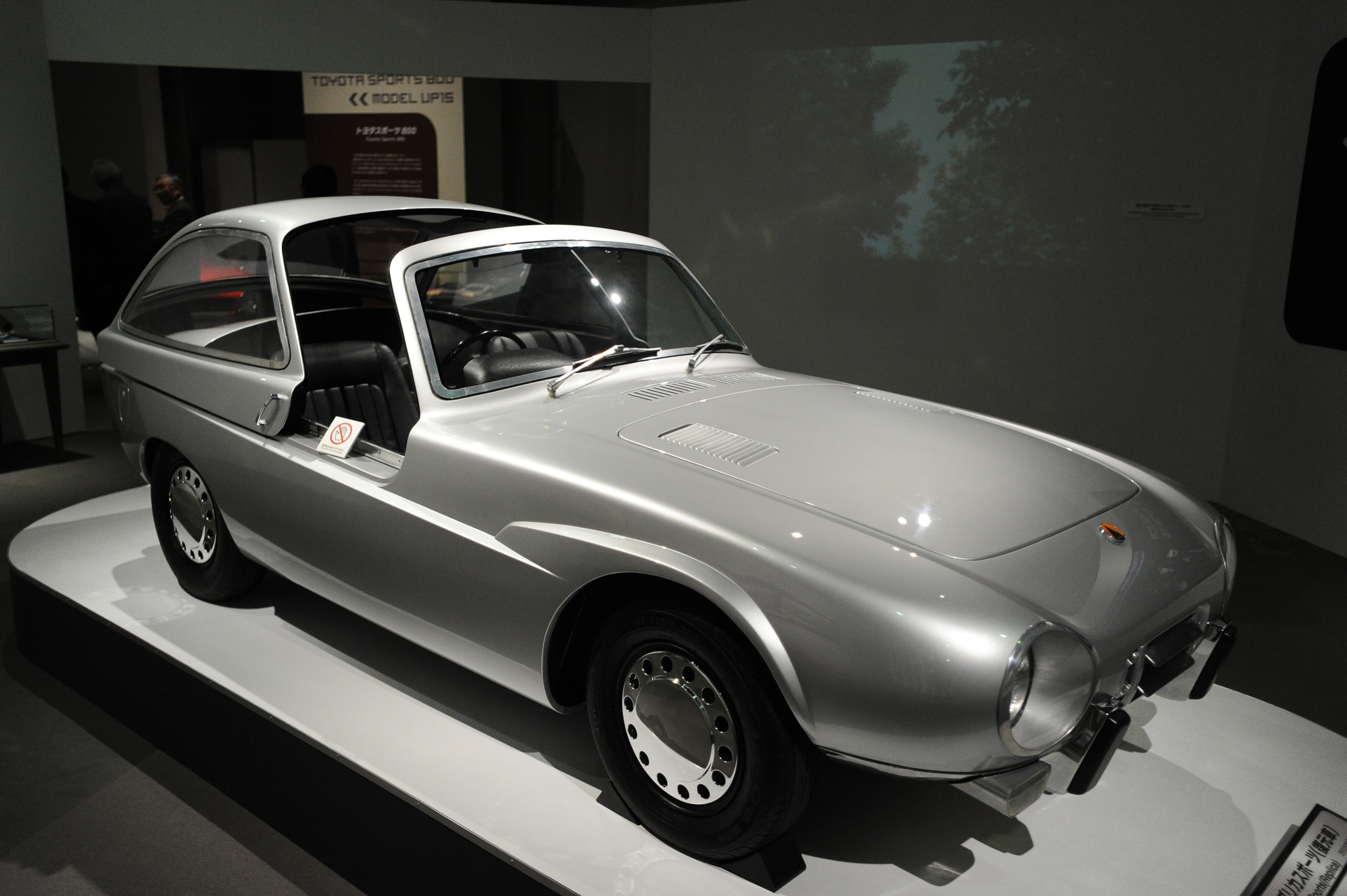
Publica Sports

== Corona 1500S Convertible (1963) ==
The Corona 1500S Convertible was a concept car displayed at the 1963 Tokyo Motor Show.

The 2-door convertible body was similar to the 4-door Corona RT20 sedan from the waistline down. The 1500 cc engine used a pair of SU carburettors and was connected to a 4-speed, all synchronised manual gearbox. It was not put into production.

== Corona 1900S Sporty Sedan (1963) ==
The Corona 1900S Sporty Sedan was a concept car displayed at the 1963 Tokyo Motor Show.

The 1897 cc 3R engine from the Crown was fitted to a Corona RT20 sedan instead of the standard 1500 cc engine, increasing power to 80 PS (59 kW). It was not sold in Japan but in 1964 it was sold in the American market as the RT30L Tiara, replacing the identical looking 1500 cc RT20L.

== Corona Sports Coupe (1963) ==
The Corona Sports Coupe was a concept car by Toyota shown at the 1963 Tokyo Motor Show. Although it used the Corona name, it shared little except for the suspension.

The body was similar to 2+2 coupes produced by many Italian design houses, with simple, clean lines instead of the more pronounced lines of the 1961 X concept car. Even the front indicators were demurely placed within the front grille next to a pair of single headlights instead of the more usual place under the bumper. The swage line started midway along the door, continued to the rear flanks and then raised up before flowing around the rear corners to form the top rear edge of the boot. Unlike other Toyota models of the time, horizontal rear indicators were used as part of the emerging trend in car design.

The engine was the 1897 cc 3R engine from the Crown with twin SU carburettors. Transmission was by a floor shift, 4 speed, fully synchronised manual gearbox. Top speed was 170 km/h.

== Crown Convertible (1963) ==
The 2-door Crown Convertible was displayed at the 1963 Tokyo Motor Show, based on the Crown 1900 coupe. Features included a hydraulically operated folding soft top and electric windows. The 1897 cc 3R engine had dual SU carburetors fitted, raising the power to 100 PS (74 kW). Transmission was by a 4-speed column shift manual gearbox. It was not put into production.

== Dream Car Model (1963) ==
The Dream Car Model was a small, scale model of a concept car shown at the 1963 Tokyo Motor Show, displayed inside of a transparent dome. This was designed as a 'running reception room inside a luxurious cabin'. The body was a cab forward van on a stretched chassis. The top half was completely formed from transparent panels, including the roof, and featured seats that faced each other.

== EX Dream Car (1965) ==
The Dream Car was a 2-seater concept sports car shown at the 1965 Tokyo Motor Show. It was a scale model displayed on a stand, meant to show a cutting edge design, featuring a centre fin that crosses over a mostly glass canopy. The headlight bulbs extended forward out of the body work and had thin spikes projecting further forward. It was made without intention of reaching production and was not made as a fully-functional concept car. As for all Toyota concept cars featuring 'EX,' it meant Experimental, and preceded the three numerically numbered EX concept cars debuted in 1969. After the initial public display at the Tokyo Motor Show, it was displayed at a Japanese Automobile Manufacturers Association (JAMA) sponsored event in the mid-to-late 60's, but the concept car and the vehicle's manufacturer documentation has been allegedly lost as early as the 1970s.

== EX-I (1969) ==
Designed to show how Japan's new highways could be used, the EX-I was a 2-seater concept sports car shown at the 1969 Tokyo Motor Show. Styling was similar to the Celica released the next year with more emphasis placed on aerodynamics. A roof mounted spoiler was raised and lowered electrically to increase stability at high speed. The interior was ergonomically designed with a wrap around console so that all switches were within easy reach of the driver. Twin exhausts and bonnet scoops hinted at an engine larger than normally used on Japanese cars.

== EX-II (1969) ==
The EX-II was a 2-seater, fully enclosed electric runabout shown at the 1969 Tokyo Motor Show.

== EX-III (1969) ==
Shown at the 1969 Tokyo Motor Show, the EX-III was the big brother of the EX-I. The larger body was even more aerodynamic, being built very low with a pointed front (no bumper), a long bonnet, sharply sloped sides and a tapered rear. Large exhaust outlets hinted at a gas turbine engine but no details were given.

== See also ==
- Toyota concept vehicles (1970–1979)
- Toyota concept vehicles (1980–1989)
- Toyota concept vehicles (1990–1999)
- Toyota concept vehicles (2000–2009)
- Toyota concept vehicles (2010–2019)
- Toyota concept vehicles (2020–2029)
