= Toyota MiniAce =

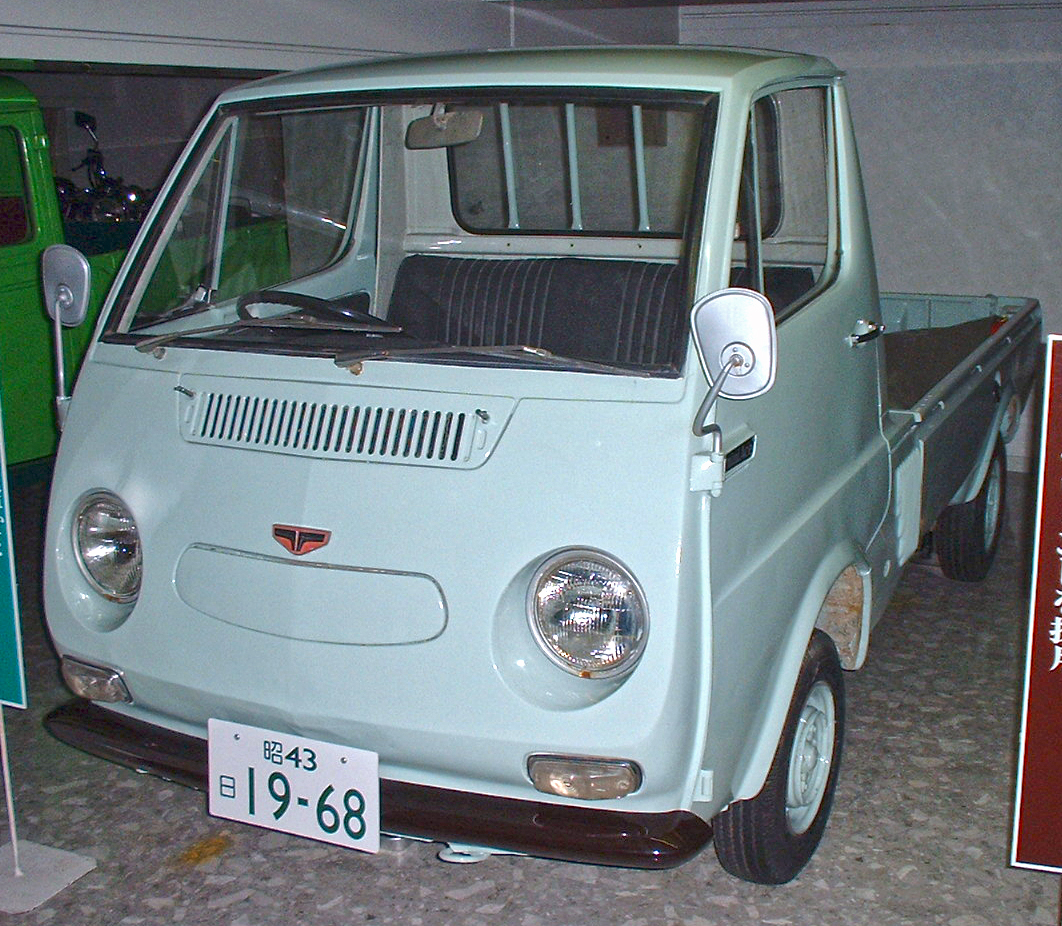

Overview
- Manufacturer: Toyota (until December 1969); Daihatsu (from January 1970); Hino Motors (from January 1970)
- Production: Nov. 1967 – Nov. 1975
- Assembly: Takaoka plant, Toyota, Aichi, Japan; Hamura, Tokyo, Japan (Hino)

Body and chassis
- Body style: truck microvan microbus
- Layout: MR
- Platform: P100-series
- Related: Toyota Publica

Powertrain
- Engine: 790 cc 2U air-cooled OHV H2
- Transmission: 4-speed manual (column shift)

Dimensions
- Wheelbase: 1,950 mm (77 in)
- Length: 3,505 mm (138 in) (truck); 3,610 mm (142 in) (van/bus)
- Width: 1,380 mm (54 in)
- Height: 1,625–1,675 mm (64–66 in)
- Curb weight: 600–770 kg (1,320–1,700 lb)

Chronology
- Successor: Toyota TownAce

The Toyota MiniAce was a small utility vehicle built by Toyota from November 1967 until November 1975. It shared many parts with the Toyota Publica, especially the Publica P20 Pickup. In Japan, it was sold through the Toyota Corolla Store and Toyota Auto Store networks. Because it shares many parts with the popular Toyota Publica and the highly collectable Toyota Sports 800 most MiniAces have been used for parts and very few survive. Its exterior dimensions and engine displacement, while very small, do not conform to "kei car" Japanese government regulations.

== History ==
The concept originally possessed a particularly small turning circle of only 7.8 m (25.6 ft). It entered the market in November 1967, as a truck or as a panel van. Priced low, in consideration of its 500 kg (1,100 lb) payload, the MiniAce sold well, especially due to its compliance to the Japanese annual road tax obligation.

True success followed once the MiniAce Van (UP100V) and MiniAce Coach, a seven-seater minibus, were added in August 1968. Soon, though, more modern challengers like Mitsubishi's Delica began whittling away at the market share of the MiniAce. Its toughest competitor, the 1969 Datsun Sunny Cab received a water-cooled 1.2 liter engine for 1972. The MiniAce's 2U-B engine offered only 36 PS (26 kW) at 4,600 rpm, which was enough for a claimed top speed of 110 km/h (68 mph). Nonetheless, Toyota's 1967 engagement with Daihatsu meant that Toyota was to relinquish this portion of the market, and no more serious investments in the MiniAce were made. After December 1969, manufacture was transferred from Toyota's Takaoka plant and was now shared between Hino, Daihatsu, and the Fuji Auto Body Co., Ltd. which made the bodies.

In the early seventies the MiniAce received a very light facelift, mainly consisting of a plastic shield with a "Toyota" script located just beneath the front windshield. As the air-cooled U engine would have a hard time passing new, stricter emissions standards for 1976, production was halted in November 1975. Although the MiniAce had become too small and spartan for the now more sophisticated Japanese consumers, it was still a strong seller in other Asian markets. The larger LiteAce and all new TownAce took over, with Daihatsu's Hijet covering the lower end of the segment.

In December 2011, Toyota returned to this market segment with the introduction of the Toyota Pixis Van and Truck, rebadged Daihatsu Hijets.
