= Toyota Sports 800 =

Toyota Sports 800 (UP15)
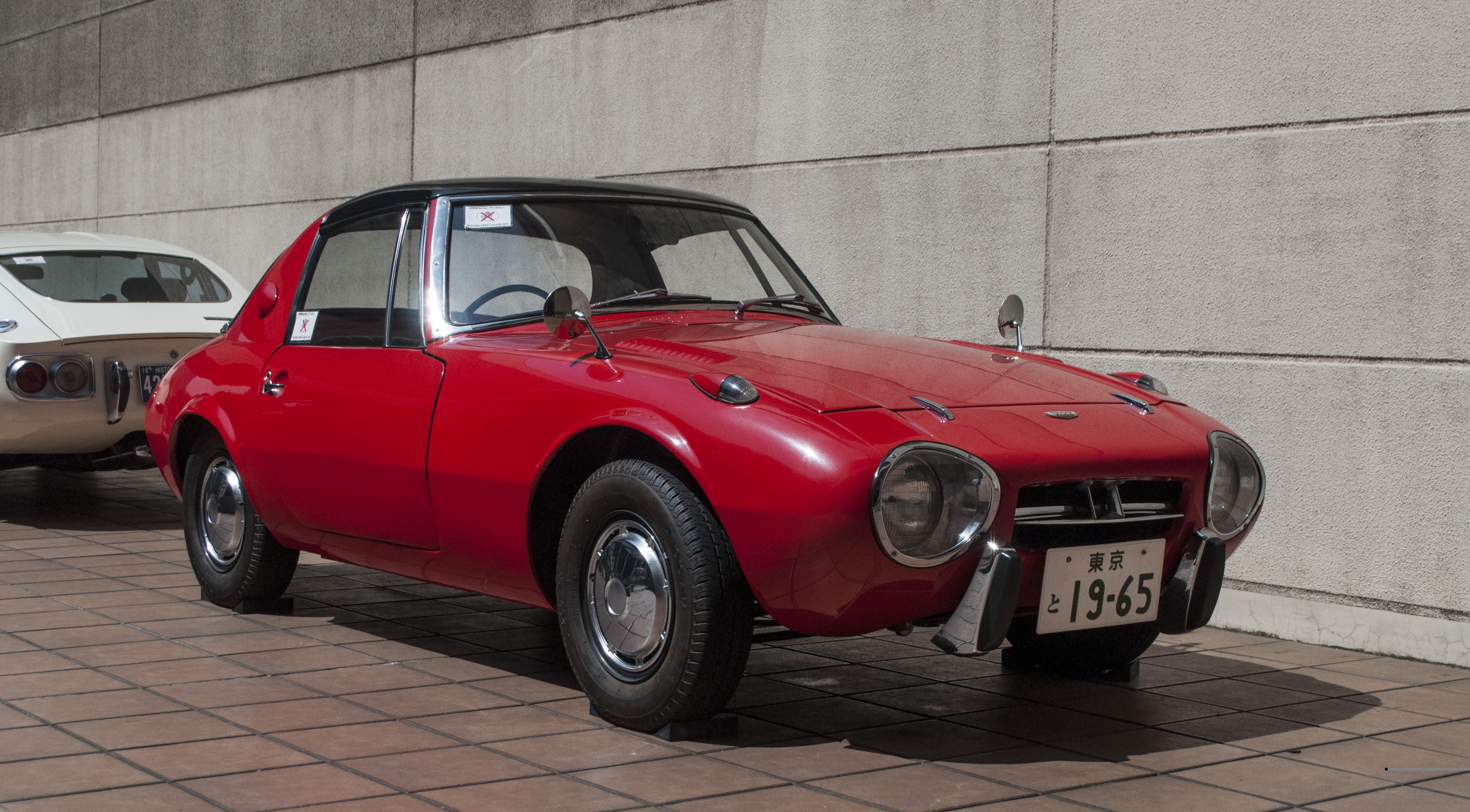

Overview
- Manufacturer: Toyota
- Production: April 1965 – October 1969; 3,131 produced
- Assembly: Japan: Yokosuka, Kanagawa (Kanto Auto Works)
- Designer: Shozo Sato, Tatsuo Hasegawa

Body and chassis
- Class: Sports car
- Body style: 2-door coupé
- Layout: Front-engine, rear-wheel-drive
- Related: Toyota Publica

Powertrain
- Engine: 790 cc 2U-B H2 (petrol)
- Power output: 33 kW (44 hp; 45 PS)
- Transmission: 4-speed manual

Dimensions
- Wheelbase: 2,000 mm (78.7 in)
- Length: 3,580 mm (140.9 in)
- Width: 1,465 mm (57.7 in)
- Height: 1,175 mm (46.3 in)
- Curb weight: 580 kg (1,279 lb)

The Toyota Sports 800 (Japanese: トヨタ・スポーツ800, Hepburn: Toyota Supōtsu Hachihyaku) is Toyota's first production sports car. The prototype for the Sports 800, called the Publica Sports, debuted at the 1962 Tokyo Auto Show, featuring a space age sliding canopy and utilizing the 21 kW (28 hp; 29 PS) powertrain of the Publica 700, a Japanese market economy car. The Toyota Sports 800 is affectionately called the "Yota-Hachi" (ヨタハチ), which is a Japanese short form for "Toyota 8". In Japan, the vehicle was exclusive to Toyota Japan retail sales channel called Toyota Publica Store alongside the Publica.

== History ==
The car went into production in 1965, with chassis code UP15 and an increase in engine displacement from 700 cc to 800 cc, as well as dual carburetors, which increased power from 28 to 45 PS (21 to 33 kW). This engine was sufficient to power the light car around town at 70 km/h (45 mph) or on a race track up to about 160 km/h (100 mph). Production started after the introduction of Honda's first car, called the Honda S500, and joined the market segment that was already represented by the Datsun Fairlady, and the Daihatsu Compagno.

The car had aerodynamic styling by Shozo Sato, a designer on loan from Datsun, and Toyota engineer Tatsuo Hasegawa. Hasegawa had been an aircraft designer in World War II and the resulting Sports 800 was a lightweight and agile machine. The Sports 800 was one of the first production cars featuring a lift-out roof panel, or targa top, pre-dating the Porsche Targa. The aluminum targa top could be stored in the trunk, when not in use.

Between 1965 and 1969 approximately 3,131 units were built by Toyota subcontractor Kanto Auto Works. Only about 10% of those vehicles are known to have survived, most being in Japan.

Production tables show 1,235 cars manufactured in 1965, 703 in 1966, 538 in 1967, 440 in 1968, and 215 in 1969. The Sports 800 was available in three colours from new : Seminole Red, Zircon Blue and Amethyst Silver Metallic.

The vast majority of the 3,131 cars were right hand drive, but some 300 were left hand drive models, built primarily for the Okinawan market (having been American occupied, Okinawa drove on the right side of the road unlike the rest of Japan). A very limited number of left hand drive cars were used by Toyota to "test drive" in the US, but the American dealerships decided the 800 would not sell well in the US and made a decision not to import or sell the cars in the US market. Toyota let these dealers keep the original batch of around 40 Sports 800s in the US instead of having them shipped back to Japan.

There are subtle design differences between the years. Noticeable differences have included: change over from non-synchro to synchro first gear in 1967; a grille and bumperette change in 1968; and side marker lights in 1969. The basic body design, however, remained unchanged.

An air-cooled 790 cc horizontally opposed two-cylinder boxer engine powered the vehicle. The 0.8 liter 2U (45 PS at 5,400 rpm) was produced from 1965 through 1969, while a similar 2U-B was produced from 1966 through 1976 (in 1975 the Dyna Coaster Bus manual shows that Toyota used the 2U-B as a separate auxiliary engine, just to run the air conditioning unit for the bus). In a less tuned form, the 2U was also used in the Publica (UP20/UP26) and MiniAce (UP100).

Weight was kept down by using aluminum on selected body panels and thin steel on the unibody construction. For the first few years of production even the seat frames were made of aluminum.

Toyota produced a one-off prototype Sports 800 Gas Turbine Hybrid for the 1979 Tokyo Motor Show. The body of the Sports 800 also served as basis of the Sports EV and Sports EV Twin electric concept cars, both unveiled in 2010.

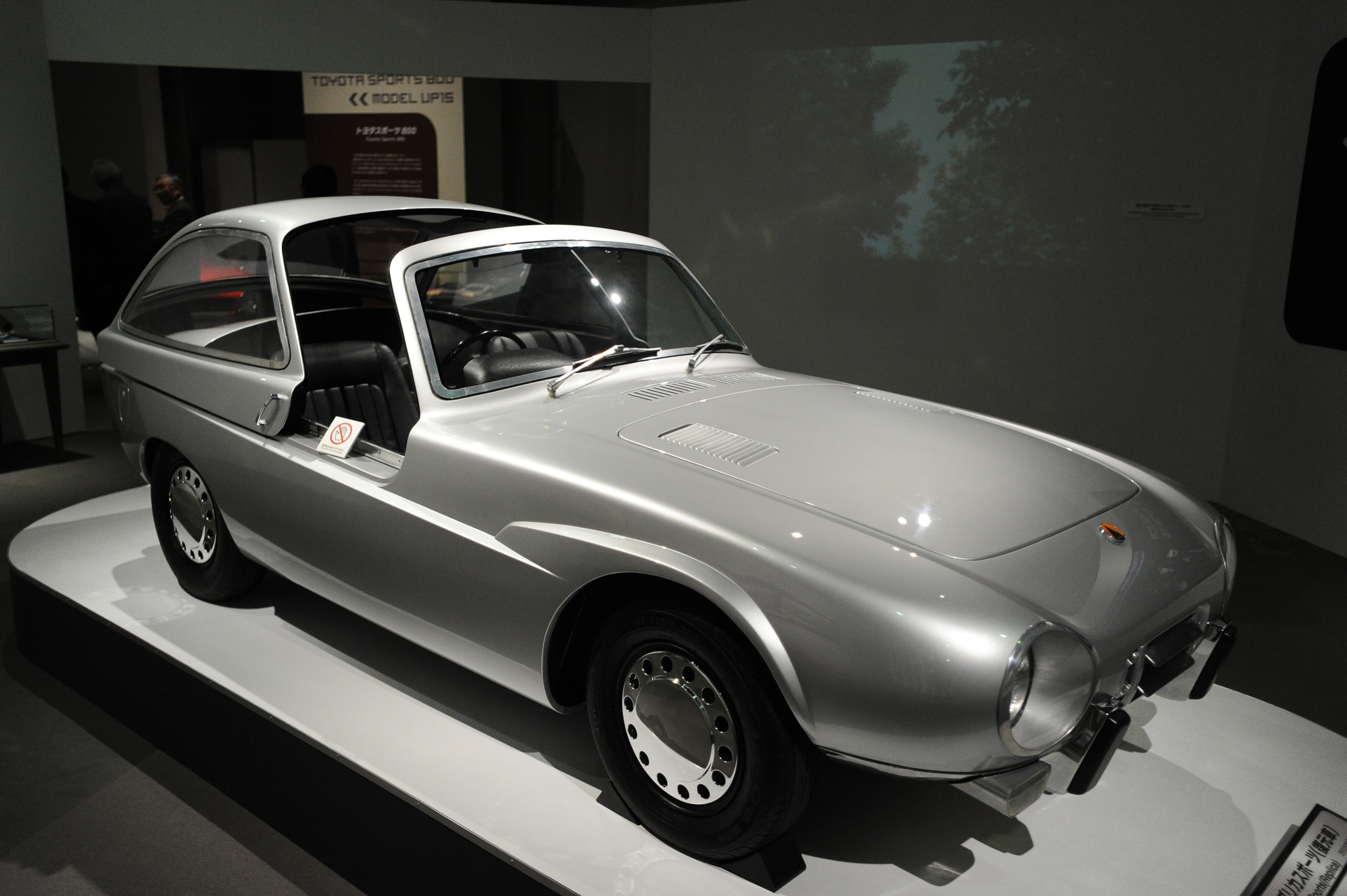
Publica Sports styling prototype

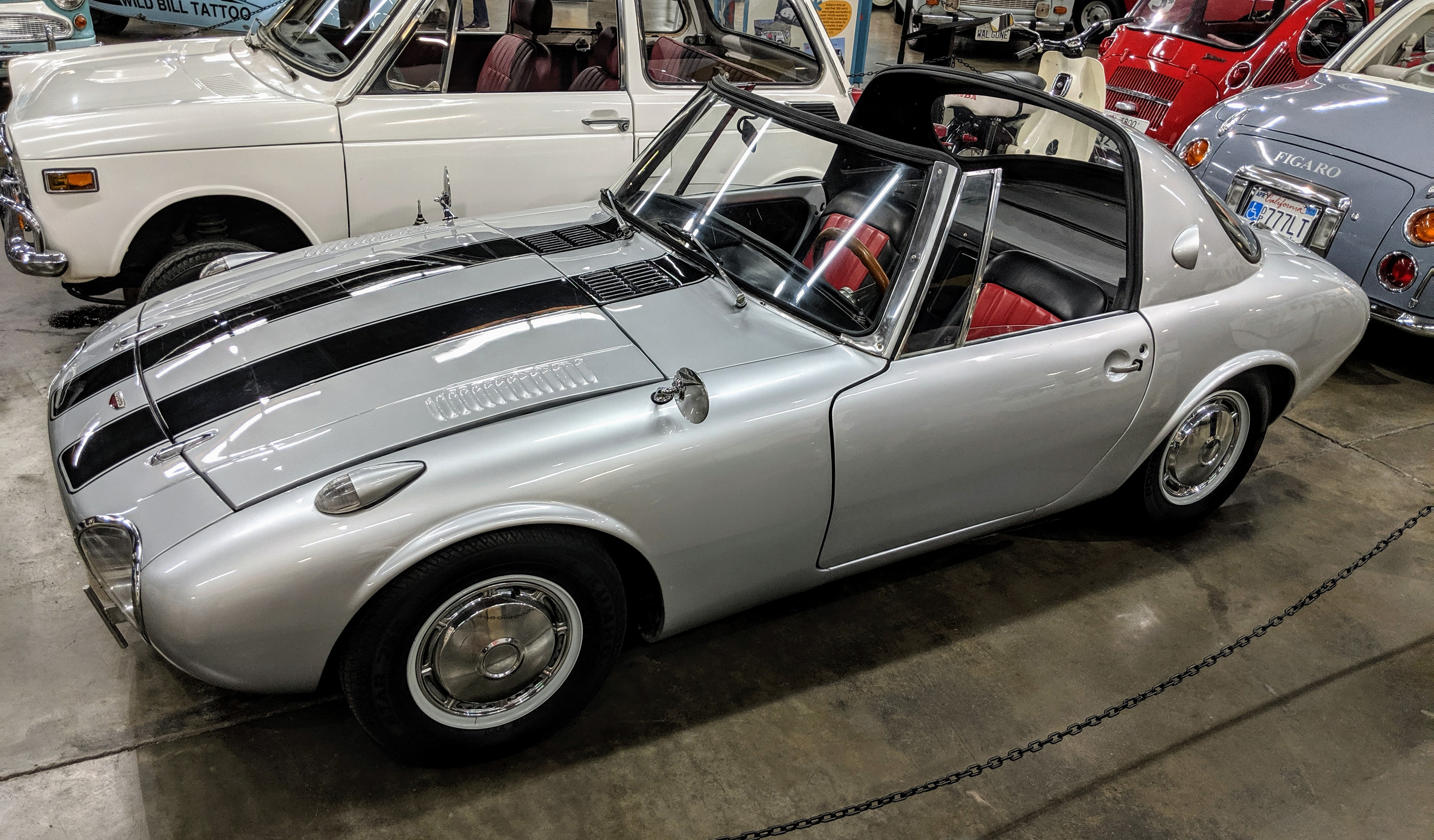
A 1967 Toyota Sports 800 in left-hand drive configuration

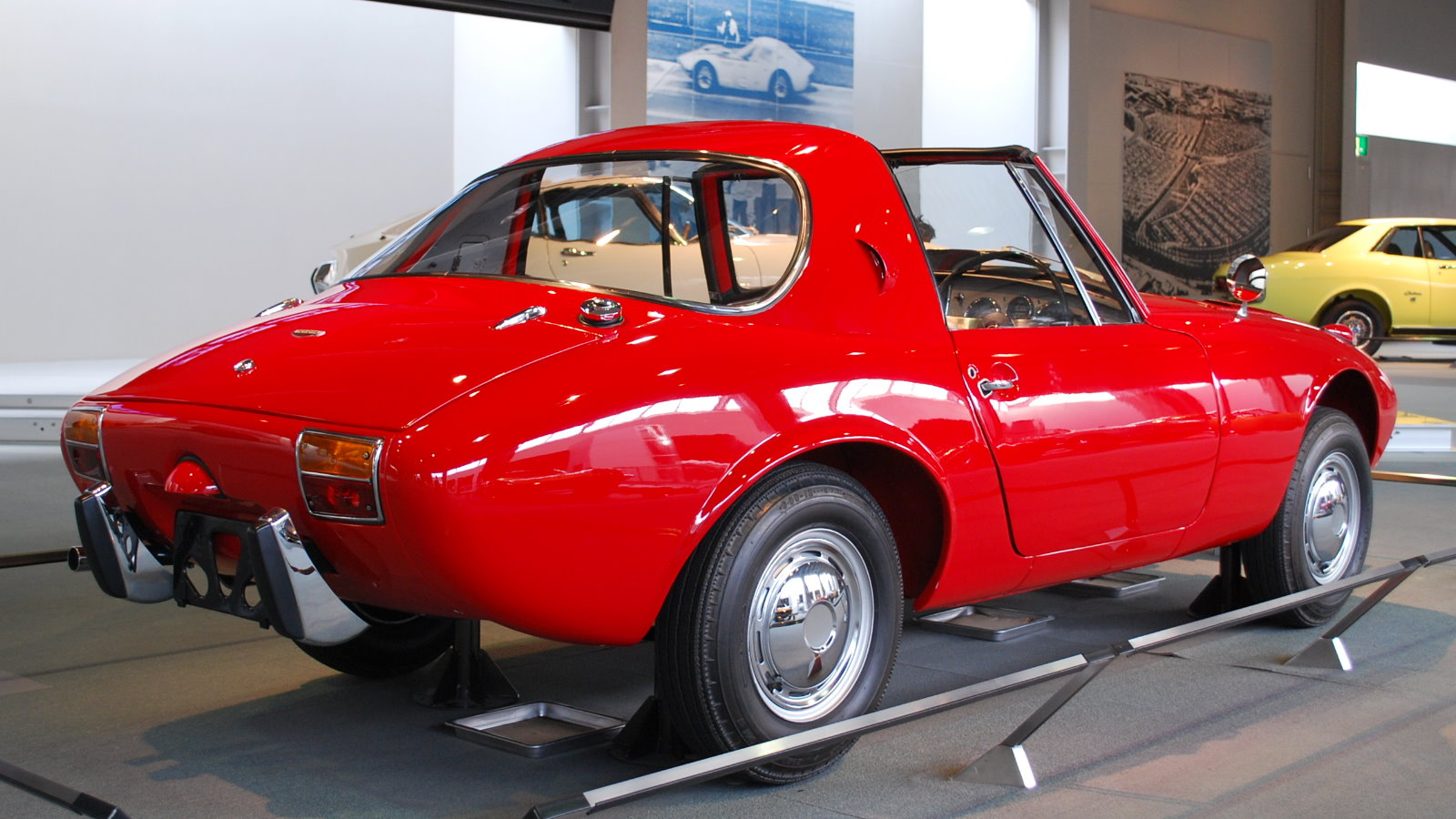
Rear view of 1965 Sports 800 with roof panel removed

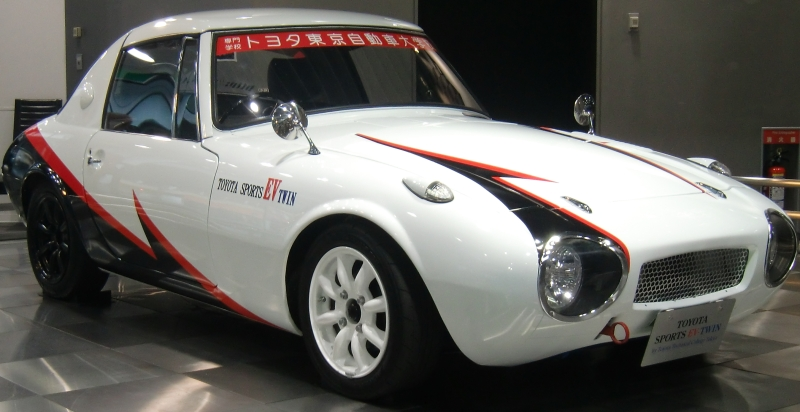
Toyota Sports 800 EV Twin

== See also ==
- Toyota Publica Sports
- Toyota Publica

== Bibliography ==
- Toyota 2000GT Sports 800. Neko Publishing Co.
- Toyota Publica & Sports 800. Miki Press.
- Toyota Sports 800 Production Figure Documents. Toyota Motor Corporation, Global External Affairs Division.
- "1968 Toyota Motor Sales" (Press release). USA: Toyota.
- 1975 Toyota Dyna Coaster Bus Manual.
