= Toyota concept vehicles (1990–1999) =

Toyota Concept Vehicles produced between 1990 and 1999 include:

== TownAce Van EV (1991) ==
Toyota TownAce Van EV

Overview
- Manufacturer: Toyota
- Production: 1991

Body and chassis
- Related: Toyota TownAce (R20)

The TownAce Van EV is a battery-electric prototype of the R20 series TownAce.

== Avalon (1991) ==
Toyota Avalon

Overview
- Manufacturer: Toyota
- Production: 1991
- Designer: Calty

Body and chassis
- Body style: 4-door convertible
- Layout: FR

Unveiled in 1991, at the 29th Tokyo Auto Show, the Avalon was a concept vehicle designed by Calty. It was a 4-door convertible where the windshield would retract and cover the passenger compartment when the vehicle was parked and secured. It could only be driven with the top open with the roof serving as the windshield, with two additional glass panels that would retract rearward and stack behind the rear seats. It was roughly the size of the Toyota Corolla Ceres. The doors were not installed with side windows which means in inclement weather the passengers were exposed, in a similar fashion to touring car bodystyles of the early 1900s. It did not appear to have any direct relation to the Avalon sedan that was later placed into production.

== AXV-III (1991) ==
Toyota AXV-III

Overview
- Manufacturer: Toyota
- Production: 1991

Body and chassis
- Platform: T190 Carina

The AXV-III was a concept vehicle first shown at the October 1991 Tokyo Motor Show and later shown at the February 1993 Chicago Auto Show. Based on the new Carina, it demonstrated automated driver aids such as vehicle-to-vehicle distance maintenance and a voice synthesiser that gave instructions for upcoming intersections.

The AXV-III cruise control maintained vehicle-to-vehicle distance. Distances over 33 feet were measured by a pulsed laser beam. Distances under 33 feet were measured by a CCD camera using techniques similar to a camera's auto-focus. The usual accelerator linkage was replaced by an electronic version so that the computer could slow the car down automatically by removing power and activating the brakes when the car in front came too close.

A voice activated GPS system displayed the current location on a display while additional safety was supplied by two door mounted airbags.

== AXV-IV (1991) ==
Toyota AXV-IV
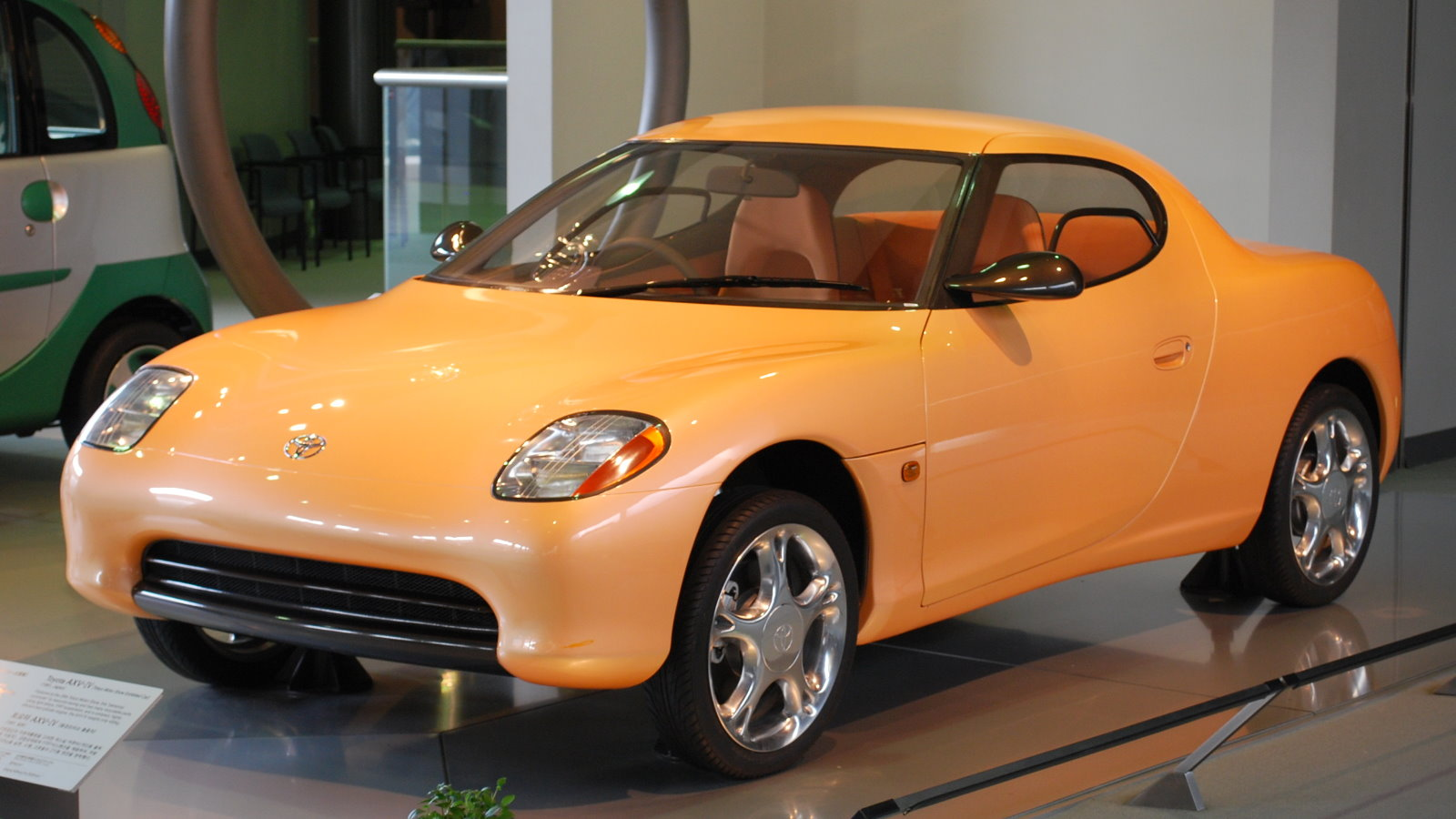

Overview
- Manufacturer: Toyota
- Production: 1991

Body and chassis
- Body style: 2-door coupe
- Layout: FR

Powertrain
- Engine: 804 cc two-cylinder supercharged two-stroke

Dimensions
- Curb weight: 450 kilograms (990 lb)

The AXV-IV was a concept vehicle first shown at the October 1991 Tokyo Motor Show. It is a small coupe designed to be an environmentally friendly personal commuter. The AXV-IV is extremely light, weighing only 450 kilograms (992 lb). It is powered by an 804 cc supercharged two-stroke engine, rated at 64 hp (48 kW). The car also utilized light-weight FRP (fiberglass reinforced plastic) coil springs.

== Fun Runner (1991) ==
The Toyota Fun Runner is a 1991 concept produced by Toyota at the 29th Tokyo Motor Show. It is based on the Toyota 4Runner. Toyota demonstrated its unflagging commitment to people-friendly car-making for the 21st century that harmonized with society and the earth's environment. It is made to be a luxury sport utility vehicle.

== AXV-V (1993) ==
Toyota AXV-V

Overview
- Manufacturer: Toyota
- Production: 1993

Body and chassis
- Body style: sedan

Powertrain
- Engine: 2.0 L D-4 throttleless

The AXV-V was a concept vehicle first shown at the October 1993 Tokyo Motor Show. It is a mid-size coupe designed to be an environmentally friendly, fuel efficient family car.

The AXV-V was extremely aerodynamically efficient, with Cd=0.20. To achieve this while still being able to seat four people, the cabin was longer and further forward than normal. Aerodynamic deflectors were used before and after each wheel and the rear wheels had covers. The door handles were made flush with the body.

Power came from the D-4. This was a direct injection, four valve engine, which avoided the pumping losses of using a throttle. Control was by charge stratification at low to medium loads and by homogeneous mixture control at high loads. At low loads, one of the inlet valves was disabled.

There were two 8 inch LCD screen in the front and two 6 inch LCD screens in the rear. The driver's screen showed a three-dimensional speedometer and collision-avoidance information. The passenger screens showed navigational and a TV monitor.

== Crown Majesta EV (1993) ==
Toyota Crown Majesta EV

Overview
- Manufacturer: Toyota
- Production: 1993

Body and chassis
- Class: 4-door sedan

The Crown Majesta EV was introduced in 1993. It is based on the S140 series Crown Majesta. It includes all the same features as the Crown Majesta S140, but being battery-powered.

== ASV (1995) ==
Toyota produced the first ASV (Advanced Safety Vehicle) in 1995. It includes 17 safety systems: Drowsy Driving Warning System, Tyre Pressure Warning System, Fire Alarm System, Automatic Headlight Arrangement System, Corner Monitor System, Next-Generation Information Display System, Lamp-Based Intervehicle Information, Transmission System, Navigation System for Road Traffic Information, Automatic Collision-Reduction Braking System, SOS Vehicle Stop System, Seat Belt Pretensioner System (all seats), Side Air Bag System, Collision-Sensing Automatic Braking System, Hood Air Bag System, Fire Extinguishing System, Accident Reporting System, and a Drive Recorder System. It is built on a Toyota Sprinter base, and can seat 4 people.

== FLV (1995) ==
Toyota FLV

Overview
- Manufacturer: Toyota
- Production: 1995

Body and chassis
- Body style: station wagon
- Layout: FWD

Powertrain
- Engine: 3.0 L 1MZ-FE V6

Dimensions
- Wheelbase: 2,720 mm (107.1 in)
- Length: 4,775 mm (188.0 in)
- Width: 1,800 mm (70.9 in)
- Height: 1,515 mm (59.6 in)

The FLV (Future Luxury Vehicle) was a concept vehicle built by Toyota. It was first shown at the October 1995 Tokyo Motor Show as the Toyota FLV and then at the January 1996 North American International Auto Show as the Lexus FLV. The exterior design was by Toyota USA's Calty Design Research.

The FLV was designed to be luxurious and also practical for an active lifestyle by having a large cargo compartment access by a rear hatch. The side windows are shaped like ordinary sedan windows but the roofline is closer to that of a wagon. Toyota called the shape a "monoform oval silhouette'.

The seat height was chosen so that the passenger's legs could swing out onto the ground without having to shift their body up (as in a normal sedan) or down (as in an SUV). An electronic centre console in the dash housed accessories such as a navigation display, air conditioning controls, the entertainment system and email (connected to a cell phone network).

The 2005 Toyota FT-SX concept vehicle fulfilled a similar purpose.

== Fun Runner II (1995) ==
The Second Fun Runner. Produced in 1995. Added additional off-road options.

== MRJ (1995) ==
Toyota MRJ

Overview
- Manufacturer: Toyota
- Production: 1995

Body and chassis
- Class: 2 door convertible
- Body style: convertible
- Layout: 4WS

Powertrain
- Engine: 4-cylinder DOHC20

Dimensions
- Wheelbase: 2550 mm
- Length: 3995 mm
- Width: 1695 mm
- Height: 1240 mm

The Toyota MRJ is a concept convertible made by Toyota in 1995. Toyota says, "At Toyota, we know exactly what a sports car should be: responsive to the driver's every command, quick off the mark, and nimble on a twisty road. We've always felt the midship engine design was the best way to meet all those goals, and ensure unprecedented comfort. The Toyota MRJ has all the sportscar characteristics a midship engine car can offer, plus extra utility that lets you add sporty driving to your everyday life. Enthusiasts today want the joy of a sports cars with a personal touch-with individualist form and colouring. The Toyota MRJ fits the bill perfectly."

== Hybrid Electric Bus (1995) ==
Toyota Hybrid Electric Bus

Overview
- Manufacturer: Toyota
- Production: 1995

Body and chassis
- Related: Coaster

Powertrain
- Engine: 1.3 L 4E-FE I4

Dimensions
- Length: 6,990 mm (275.2 in)
- Width: 2,070 mm (81.5 in)
- Height: 2,580 mm (101.6 in)
- Curb weight: 4,150 kg (9,149 lb)

The Hybrid Electric Bus was a petrol-electric hybrid concept vehicle built by Toyota and first shown at the October 1995 Tokyo Motor Show. It was based on the Coaster bus and was operated the same as a normal small bus.

The 1.3 L engine generated 20 kW (27 hp), which was fed to a bank of 24×12V sealed lead acid batteries. The batteries then supplied power to a 70 kW (94 hp) / 405 N⋅m (299 lbf⋅ft) AC induction electric motor. Top speed was 80 km/h (50 mph). A regenerative braking system was fitted.

The display vehicle had 14 ordinary seats, could hold one extra passenger in a wheelchair and was fitted with a wheelchair lifter.

== Moguls (1995) ==
Toyota Moguls

Overview
- Manufacturer: Toyota
- Production: 1995

Powertrain
- Engine: 1.5 L 5K I4

Dimensions
- Wheelbase: 2,000 mm (78.7 in)
- Length: 3,165 mm (124.6 in)
- Width: 1,640 mm (64.6 in)
- Height: 1,795–2,295 mm (70.7–90.4 in)

The Moguls was a 4WD concept vehicle built by Toyota and first shown at the October 1995 Tokyo Motor Show. It was a narrow 2-seater designed to provide access to forest areas that are not accessible by conventional 4WD vehicles.

The driver sat in the centre of the front row with a large, almost horizontal steering wheel. Visibility was enhanced by a large front window, small windows in the lower sections of the doors, a low instrument panel and powered external mirrors. The single passenger sat behind and to the right of the driver. A single large door was used on the right hand side and a small door was used on the left hand side (driver access only). A light, open cargo area was provided at the rear.

Each wheel could also be raised and lowered independently by up to 500mm so that the vehicle could remain level at all times or so that the vehicle could be raised to clear stumps and large rocks. Each wheel was automatically adjusted to keep equal pressure on all wheels - helping to maintain grip. For extremely rough ground, the wheels could be replaced by 4 individual caterpillar tracks - the front tracks were steerable to lessen damage to the ground.

Conventional drive shafts allow only a limited height range. Instead, the engine was connected to two hydraulic pumps (one for each side) that used pipes to drive individual hydraulic motors in each wheel. The hydraulic transmission could use three sets of valves to provide 2WD/4WD selection by disconnecting the front motors, LSD functionality by locking the left and right hydraulic circuits together or to make tighter turning circles by providing less power to the inner wheels. To go down steep slopes, a low range could be used that did not require the driver to directly control the accelerator or brakes, allowing him to concentrate on outside conditions.

== FCHV-1 (1996) ==
Toyota FCHV-1

Overview
- Manufacturer: Toyota
- Production: 1996

Body and chassis
- Body style: SUV

Powertrain
- Engine: Hydrogen fuel cell

Chronology
- Predecessor: Toyota RAV4
- Successor: Toyota FCHV-2

The FCHV-1, introduced in 1996, was Toyota's first fuel cell vehicle, based on the Toyota RAV4 and equipped with a hydrogen-absorbing alloy storage unit.

== FCHV-2 (1997) ==
Toyota FCHV-2

Overview
- Manufacturer: Toyota
- Production: 1997

Body and chassis
- Body style: SUV

Powertrain
- Engine: Hydrogen fuel cell

Chronology
- Predecessor: Toyota FCHV-1
- Successor: Toyota FCHV-3

The FCHV-2, introduced in 1997, was equipped with a reformer to extract hydrogen from methanol. Like the FCHV-1, it was built from the body of a RAV4.

== Funcargo (1997) ==
Toyota Funcargo

Overview
- Manufacturer: Toyota; Stola
- Production: 1997
- Designer: Toyota EPOC

Body and chassis
- Body style: 2-door van
- Layout: FR
- Related: Funcoupe, Funtime

Chronology
- Successor: Toyota FunCargo

The Funcargo was a concept vehicle designed at Toyota's EPOC studio by Sotiris Kovos as part of the NBC (New Basic Car) Funcars project. Rendering was done at D3 Marquettes Prototypes in France and Stola in Italy. The Funcargo (one word) was shown at the September 1997 Frankfurt Motor Show and the October 1997 Tokyo Motor Show and put into production in late 1998 as the Fun Cargo (two words). The mechanicals and chassis were shared with the Funcoupe and the Funtime.

== Funcoupe (1997) ==
Toyota Funcoupe
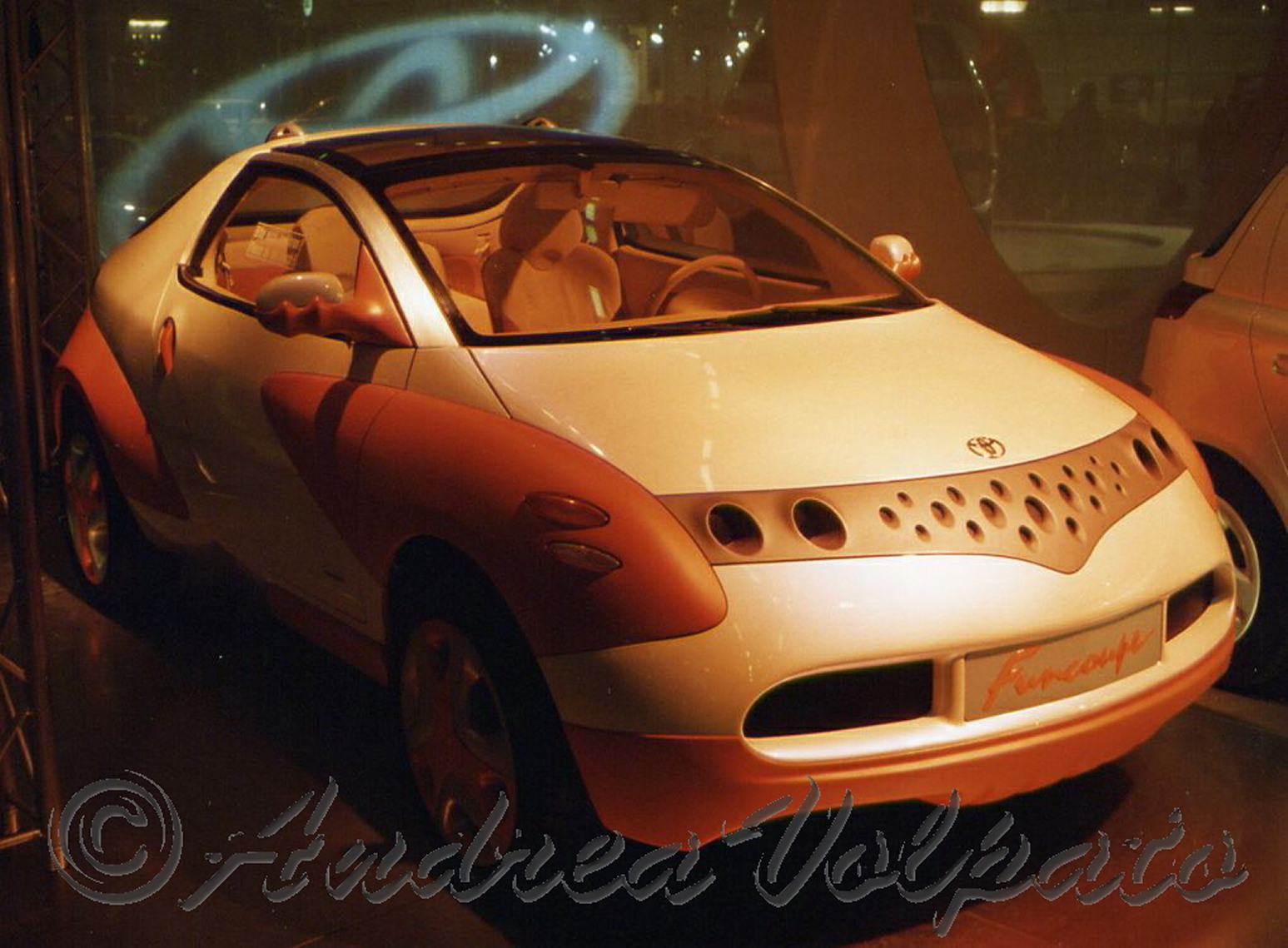

Overview
- Manufacturer: Toyota; Stola
- Production: 1997
- Designer: Toyota EPOC

Body and chassis
- Body style: 2-door coupe
- Layout: FR
- Related: Funcargo, Funtime

The Funcoupe was a concept vehicle designed at Toyota's EPOC studio by Sotiris Kovos as part of the NBC (New Basic Car) Funcars project. Rendering was done at D3 Marquettes Prototypes in France and Stola in Italy. The Funcoupe was shown at the September 1997 Frankfurt Motor Show and the October 1997 Tokyo Motor Show but was not put into production. The mechanicals and chassis were shared with the Funcargo and the Funtime.

== FCEV (1997) ==
The Toyota FCEV is a fuel cell vehicle, using methanol to drive. It was introduced in 1997. It is based on the Toyota FCHV and the Toyota Highlander.

== Funtime (1997) ==
Toyota Funtime

Overview
- Manufacturer: Toyota
- Production: 1997
- Designer: Toyota EPOC

Body and chassis
- Body style: 4-door hatchback
- Layout: FR
- Related: Funcargo, Funcoupe

Chronology
- Successor: Toyota FunCargo

The Funtime was a concept vehicle designed at Toyota's EPOC studio by Sotiris Kovos as part of the NBC (New Basic Car) Funcars project. Rendering was done at D3 Marquettes Prototypes in France and Stola Spa and Forum in Italy. The Funtime was shown at the September 1997 Frankfurt Motor Show and the October 1997 Tokyo Motor Show and put into production in late 1998 as the Vitz/Yaris/Echo. The mechanicals and chassis were shared with the Funcargo and the Funcoupe.

== NEW (1997) ==
Toyota NEW

Overview
- Manufacturer: Toyota
- Production: 1997
- Assembly: Japan

Body and chassis
- Class: SUV
- Body style: 5-door crossover SUV

Dimensions
- Length: 4615 mm
- Width: 1825 mm
- Height: 1685 mm

The Toyota NEW, officially the Toyota NEW Concept, is a prototype 5-door crossover SUV. It was shown at the 1997 Tokyo Motor Show. The NEW has dimensions of 4615 mm/1825 mm/1685 mm.

== NC250 (1997) ==
Toyota Progrès NC250

Overview
- Manufacturer: Toyota
- Production: 1998-2007

Body and chassis
- Class: sedan
- Body style: 5 door sedan
- Layout: RWD

Powertrain
- Engine: 6-cylinder, 2.5-litre

Dimensions
- Wheelbase: 2,780 mm
- Length: 4,500 mm
- Width: 1,700 mm
- Height: 1,490 mm
- Curb weight: 1460 kg

The Toyota Progrès NC250 is a luxury sedan made by Toyota since 1998. A prototype was presented as the NC250 at the 32nd Tokyo Motor Show in 1997. It features a long wheelbase, short overhang, and a large cabin to allow advanced FR features and extra interior space surpassing that of FF vehicles. The exterior has a new silhouette that gives the impression of vitality and luxury. The NC250 is mounted with an in-line, 6-cylinder, 2.5-litre petrol engine with electronic throttle control and Variable Valve Timing-intelligence (VVT-i) technology. The newly developed AI*1-Shift (cooperative shift control) extracts road configuration and positional information from the navigation system to recognize approaching comers and apply a combination of braking and downshifting for an incredibly smooth ride. Also, an antilock brake system (ABS), traction control (TRC), Vehicle Stability Control (VSC), and Brake Assist systems enhance active safety performance. The NC250's passive safety features include a Toyota Passive Safety Body (GOA*2), dual Supplemental Restraint System (SRS) airbags, and SRS side airbags. During a side collision, a newly developed SRS curtain-shield airbag deploys from the front pillars and sides of the roof, to help reduce head impact injury. The navigation system, using a 7-inch pop-up monitor, conforms to the Vehicle Information and Communication System (VICS) and MONET*3, an on-line information service from Toyota. A radar cruise control helps relieve driver burden by maintaining a fixed distance from the preceding vehicle.

== Solara Concept (1998) ==
Toyota Solara Concept

Overview
- Manufacturer: Toyota
- Also called: Toyota Camry Solara
- Production: 1998
- Designer: Calty Design Research

Body and chassis
- Class: Convertible
- Body style: Mid-size car
- Related: Toyota Camry Solara; Lexus ES300

Powertrain
- Engine: 3.0-litre twincam V6
- Transmission: four-speed automatic

Chronology
- Predecessor: Toyota Camry

The Toyota Solara Concept was made in 1998, but entered production as the Toyota Camry Solara. The Solara convertible is a joint venture between Toyota Motor Manufacturing Canada (TMMC) and ASC. The convertible is sold only in North America. It has large lower body panels, hood, and front and rear fascias. The front bucket seats are softly comfortable and supportive, and feature perforated leather surfaces for improved comfort. The driver's seat is power-adjustable, while the front passenger seat adjusts manually. The console flows into the center stack, which contains the automatic climate control system and the AM/FM/cassette/CD audio system. A 6-CD in-dash changer is built in to the dashboard. The rear seat is contoured for two passengers, and access is helped by a front passenger seat that is spring-loaded to automatically move forward when necessary. The Solara Concept has a 149 kW (200 hp) 3.0-litre twincam V6 engine. Maximum torque is 290 N⋅m (214 lb⋅ft) at 4400 rpm. The production convertible was offered only with an electronically controlled four-speed automatic transmission.

== Celica Cruising Deck (1999) ==
Toyota Celica Cruising Deck

Overview
- Manufacturer: Toyota
- Production: 1999

Body and chassis
- Body style: 2-door coupe
- Layout: FF
- Platform: T230 Celica
- Related: Celica

Powertrain
- Engine: 1.8 L 2ZZ-GE I4

The Celica Cruising Deck was a concept vehicle built by Toyota and first shown at the October 1999 Tokyo Motor Show. Based on the newly released Celica, the liftback rear was replaced with a flat deck that could be folded upright to form the vertical cushion of a rear passenger seat. The window behind the front passengers could be lowered into the divider between the front and rear cabins. This divider could then be folded down to form the lower cushion of the rear seat. The headrests for the rear passengers were folded down from the high-mounted rear wing. This is similar to the rear decking and revealable rear seat of the 1979 CAL-1 concept vehicle.

The Celica Cruising Deck was often displayed connected to a similarly styled trailer holding a Jet Ski. Toyota first displayed a Jet Ski behind a concept vehicle on the RV-1.

== Celica XYR (1999) ==
Toyota Celica XYR

Overview
- Manufacturer: Toyota
- Production: 1999

Body and chassis
- Body style: 2-door coupe
- Layout: FF

Chronology
- Successor: Celica

The Celica XYR was a concept vehicle built by Toyota, with photos being released in early 1999. The Celica released in late 1999 closely resembled the XYR.

== HV-M4 (1999) ==
Toyota HV-M4
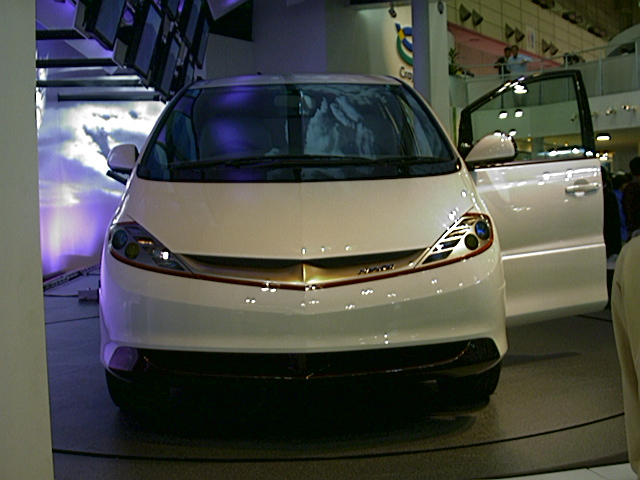

Overview
- Manufacturer: Toyota
- Production: 1999

Body and chassis
- Body style: minivan
- Layout: 4WD
- Related: Estima Hybrid

Powertrain
- Engine: 2.4 L
- Transmission: CVT

The HV-M4 was a concept vehicle built by Toyota that was first shown at the October 1999 Tokyo Motor Show, then the March 2000 Geneva Motor Show. The front wheels were powered by a petrol-hybrid system based on the first generation Prius and the rear wheels were powered by a second electric motor. It entered production in 2001 as the Estima Hybrid.

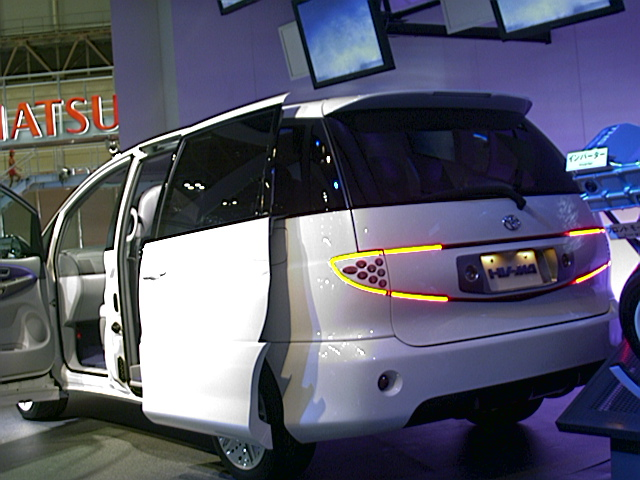
Toyota HV-M4 rear

== NCSV (1999) ==
Toyota NCSV

Overview
- Manufacturer: Toyota
- Production: 1999

Body and chassis
- Body style: 3-door wagon

The NCSV was a concept vehicle built by Toyota that was first shown at the October 1999 Tokyo Motor Show, then the March 2000 Geneva Motor Show.

The body is a blend of a three-door hatchback with a 3-door wagon with seating for 5 people. The B-pillar has been removed and the C-pillar is highly slanted towards the front of the vehicle.

== Retro Cruiser (1999) ==
Toyota Retro Cruiser

Overview
- Manufacturer: Toyota
- Production: 1999

Body and chassis
- Layout: 4WD

The Retro Cruiser was a concept vehicle built by Toyota that was first shown at the February 1999 Chicago Auto Show. It combined a modified Land Cruiser FJ40 body with the chassis and V8 engine from the Land Cruiser UZJ100.

== See also ==
- Toyota concept vehicles (1935–1969)
- Toyota concept vehicles (1970–1979)
- Toyota concept vehicles (1980–1989)
- Toyota concept vehicles (2000–2009)
- Toyota concept vehicles (2010–2019)
- Toyota concept vehicles (2020–2029)
