= Toyota concept vehicles (1970–1979) =

== EX–7 (1970) ==
Toyota EX-7

Overview
- Manufacturer: Toyota
- Production: 1970

Body and chassis
- Class: Concept sports car (S)
- Body style: 2-door coupe
- Layout: Mid-engine, rear-wheel-drive
- Related: Toyota 7

Powertrain
- Engine: 5.0 L V8
- Transmission: rear mounted manual tranaxle

The EX-7 was a 2-seat concept car made by Toyota and shown during the 1970 Tokyo Motor Show. It was an experiment (hence 'EX') to see what a supercar based on the Toyota 7 (hence '-7') racing car would be like.

The mid mounted 5 L (310 cu in) engine was similar to the Toyota 7 engine except that EX-7 did not have turbochargers. The Toyota 7 had 800 bhp (597 kW; 811 PS) but the EX-7 was detuned down to 450 PS (331 kW; 444 hp) for road use. Transmission was by a manual gearbox as part of a transaxle.

Double wishbone independent suspension was on all 4 wheels and vented disc brakes were used on both the front and rear.

The body shape was similar to that of other supercars of the time, like the Mercedes C111, with a long flat nose blended into a long windscreen and a high rear with a vertical cutoff. The doors were shaped like a typical gull-wing door but unusually the hinge was at the rear of the roof section of the door and each door opened to the rear.

== Electronics Car (1970) ==
Toyota Electronics Car

Overview
- Manufacturer: Toyota
- Production: 1970

Body and chassis
- Platform: T90 Corona

Powertrain
- Engine: 1.7 L 6R I6

A modified Corona was shown at the 1970 Tokyo Motor Show as the Electronics Car. Based on the Corona Hardtop 1700SL, it was a cutaway model showing EFI, Electric Skid Control, Electronic Automatic Transmission, air bags, monitor display and cruise control.

It was not put into production but many of its components did eventually reach production in various Toyota models.

== SV–1 (1971) ==
Toyota SV-1

Overview
- Manufacturer: Toyota
- Production: 1971

Body and chassis
- Body style: 2-door Liftback
- Layout: FR layout
- Platform: A20 Celica

Powertrain
- Engine: 1.6 L 2T-G I4
- Transmission: T50 5 speed manual

Shown at the Tokyo Motor Show in October–November 1971, the SV-1 was the prototype for the Celica liftback released in April 1973.

The prototype was built on a TA22 GT chassis with frame number TA22-026004. This was originally built in May 1971 as a Celica TA22 GT coupe. The mechanicals of the TA22 GT were retained (1600cc 2T-G twincam engine).

The front of the interior was the same as the TA22 GT except for a different fabric pattern on the seats. Electric window lifts were used (optional but rare on the TA22 GT) but the TA22 GT's optional air conditioning was not present.

The rear 2 seats were individually reclining using the same reclining hinges and latches as the front seats except that the rear latches were in the middle. A centre padded vinyl console was between the 2 rear seats and the seat belts clipped into it when not in use. The spare tyre sat vertically at the very rear of the cargo area under a vinyl cover.

The SV-1 had a rear fuel filler similar to the early coupes. Toyota changed all Celicas to side fuel fillers in mid 1972, so from the RA28 all production liftbacks had fuel fillers on the left rear quarter panel with a cover flap. The RA25 and TA27 were the first production liftbacks and their fuel fillers were in the centre rear of the vehicle, behind a pulled down panel.

The SV-1 rear hatch glass was a bit larger than the production version. The key hole for the hatch was on the beaver panel (it was on the hatch on production liftbacks). The grill was an ST type – just like all 1973–1975 production liftbacks (even the GT models). Dual exhaust tips exited out the rear (production Celicas had a single exhaust tip). An electric aerial was put in the left rear quarter (the TA22 had this on the left front wheel guard).

The RV-1 (a prototype 2 door wagon based on the Celica coupe) with the Marinetta boat and trailer was also shown at the 1971 Tokyo Motor show but did not reach production.

== Marinetta (1971) ==
Toyota Marinetta

Overview
- Manufacturer: Toyota
- Production: 1971

Body and chassis
- Body style: trailer

The Marinetta was a concept trailer made by Toyota and shown during the 1971 Tokyo Motor Show behind the RV-1 concept car.

The bottom half was a conventional single axle small trailer made from fibreglass. For the exhibit, it was shown with one inflatable tent next to it and another tent packed inside. The top half of the trailer was a small boat mounted upside-down, with the bottom half of the trailer matching the boat shape along their joining edges. The boat used an outboard motor that could be disconnected and stowed in the bottom half when the halves were reassembled for towing. The exterior was painted white with a black stripe and the interior was painted bright orange.

A jet ski and its trailer were also shown alongside the Marinetta at the show stand.

== RV–1 (1971) ==
Toyota RV-1

Overview
- Manufacturer: Toyota
- Production: 1971

Body and chassis
- Platform: A20 Celica

The RV-1 was a 2-door wagon concept car based on the Celica and shown during the 1971 Tokyo Motor Show.

The front had vertical corners instead of the normal Celica's sloping park lights (indicator lights in some markets). The bonnet was also extended forward to match. An unusual grill was used featuring large round holes instead of the more common slats or hexagonal holes.

The front windows and the doors remained the same as the Celica but the roof line was extended to cover the rear passenger seats and then continued as a thin spine to the rear of the car. On each side of the spine a centre hinged gull wing window completed the roof and continued down to the waistline. A large integral roll bar completed the rear and also held up the rear of the roof spine. The tail lights and rear indicators shown through many small round holes in the rear face of the bodywork. Unusually for Celicas, the rear bumper had cut-outs to house red reflectors and reversing lights. A 1 metre wide tail gate with a frameless wind-down window occupied the centre of the rear. The centre section of the bumper moved with the tail gate instead of being fixed directly to the body.

A tow bar was fitted so that it could be shown with the Marinetta.

The RV-1 was designed a part of a recreational vehicle system that included the RV-1 car, the Marinetta trailer (which included a fibreglass dinghy), a 5-person inflatable tent and a jet ski on its own trailer.

The SV-1 Celica liftback prototype was also shown at the same time at the 1971 Tokyo Motor Show. The RV-1 never went into production but the SV-1 did.

== MH20 (1972) ==
The Toyota MH20 is a concept car introduced in 1972, at the 19th Tokyo Motor Show. It is a motor home, based on a small bus.

== MP20 (1972) ==
The Toyota MP20 is a multi-purpose vehicle based on a small bus.

== RV–2 (1972) ==
Toyota RV-2
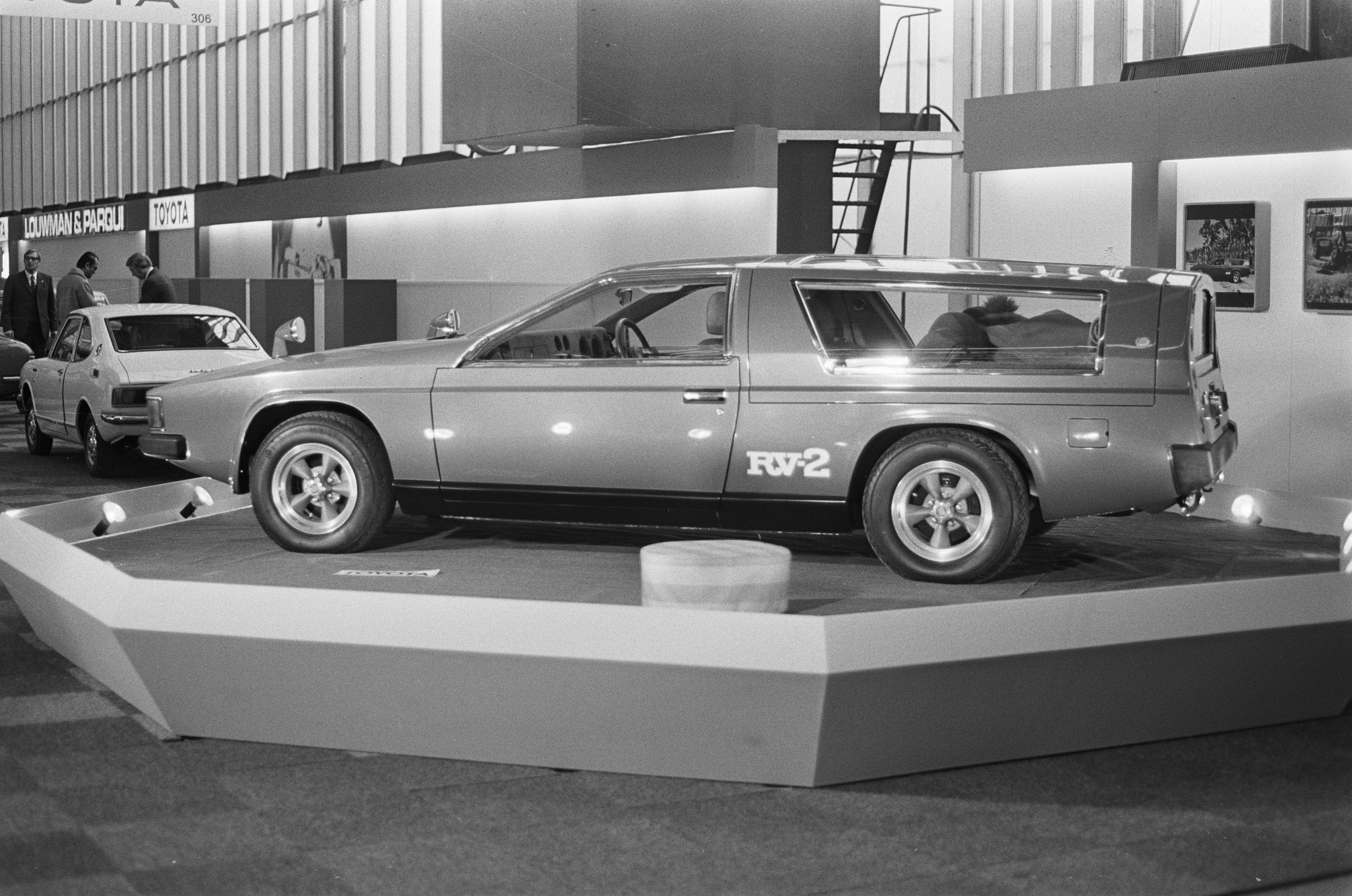

Overview
- Manufacturer: Toyota
- Production: 1972

Body and chassis
- Body style: Wagon
- Layout: RWD
- Platform: X10 Mark II or S70 Crown

Powertrain
- Engine: 2.6 L 4M I4
- Transmission: 5-speed manual

Dimensions
- Wheelbase: 2,733 mm (107.6 in)
- Length: 4,729 mm (186.2 in)
- Width: 1,788 mm (70.4 in)
- Height: 1,331 mm (52.4 in)

The RV-2 was a 2-door wagon concept car shown during the October 1972 Tokyo Motor Show. and the April 1973 New York International Auto Show.

Styling was up-to-date with sharply formed edges and large rectangular headlights. The front bumper covered only the corners, allowing the grill to be much more prominent than normal. The roof line terminated behind the large door on each side. Above the rear waistline were a pair of side hinged clam shell doors covering the entire rear section. An integrated roll bar terminated the body work and also formed a place for the clam shell doors to seal. The clam shell doors met each in the middle of the roof with no centre support. When the doors were raised you could stretch a tent between them. Two adults could sleep in the tent section and another two adults could sleep on the front seats, which could fold down flat. Finally, the rear section included a full-width tail gate with a wind-down window nestled under the rear roll bar.

Larger than the 1971 RV-1, some sources say the RV-2 was based on the Mark II while others say it was based on the Crown. Both the Mark II and the Crown shared major mechanical parts with the RV-2 (4M engine, transmission, suspension), so either could be true. The RV-2 uses wheels with 5 studs, just like the Crown and unlike the 4 stud Mark II wheels but these parts are easy to swap between the cars. The 2600 cc 4M engine was uprated to include SU carburettors to give 190 km/h.

A fully working prototype in RHD was shown at the Tokyo Motor Show and reviewed in the August 1973 issue of Penthouse magazine. Toyota also printed a large number of a brochure for the USA market in order to gauge the market reaction. It was generally well received but apparently not enough to put it into production. The brochure included sketches with the steering wheel clearly shown on the left hand side but the photographs of the real vehicle hid the steering wheel – which was on the right hand side.

== ESV–2 (1972) ==
Toyota ESV-2

Overview
- Manufacturer: Toyota
- Production: 1972

Powertrain
- Engine: 1600 cc 2T

The ESV was a 2-door, 2-seater concept car built to conform to the Japanese government's Experimental Safety Vehicle specifications and shown during the 1972 Tokyo Motor Show. Weight had to be under 1,150 kg (2,535 lb) and prevent serious injury in a crash with a 1,814 kg (4,000 lb) vehicle at 80 km/h (50 mph). In order to provide adequate crumple zones while remaining within the size given by the government specifications, Toyota was forced to make the car a 2-seater. The vehicle at the show was the second ESV made. Unique alloy wheels were used.

== Town Spider System (1973) ==
Toyota Town Spider System

Overview
- Manufacturer: Toyota
- Production: 1973

Dimensions
- Length: 2,480 mm (97.6 in)
- Width: 1,300 mm (51.2 in)
- Height: 1,300 mm (51.2 in)

The Toyota Town Spider System is a concept vehicle made by Toyota in 1973. It was shown at the Tokyo Motor Show. The Town Spider System is a part of Toyota's MAC (Multi-functional Automobile Communication) project. The car gives the driver information about traffic and weather, and can alert the driver of road detours and car accidents. It included a telephone, which, at the time, was an item for the rich.

== ESV (1973) ==
Toyota ESV
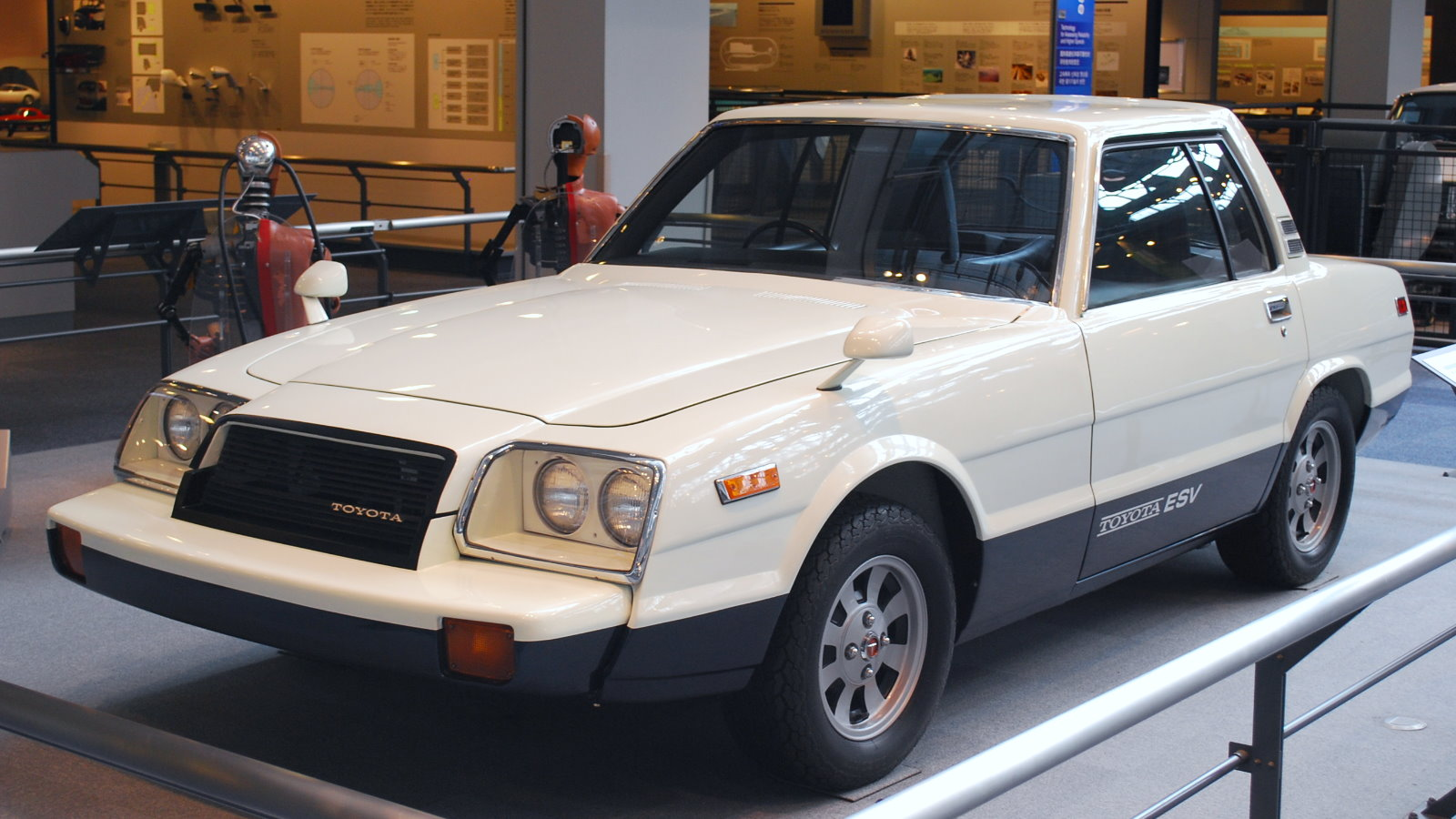

Overview
- Manufacturer: Toyota
- Production: 1973

Powertrain
- Engine: 1600 cc 2T

The ESV was a 2-door, 2-seater concept car built to conform to the Japanese government's Experimental Safety Vehicle specifications and shown during the 1973 Tokyo Motor Show. The ESV was the 100th and final vehicle produced by Toyota under the ESV program. It was mostly similar to the ESV-2 except the ESV had larger, plastic bumpers and slight differences in the trim.

Safety features included 4-wheel anti-skid brakes, 4-beam headlights, air bags, silicone rubber front bumper mounted on internal shock absorbers and crumple zones. The front suspension used double wishbones.

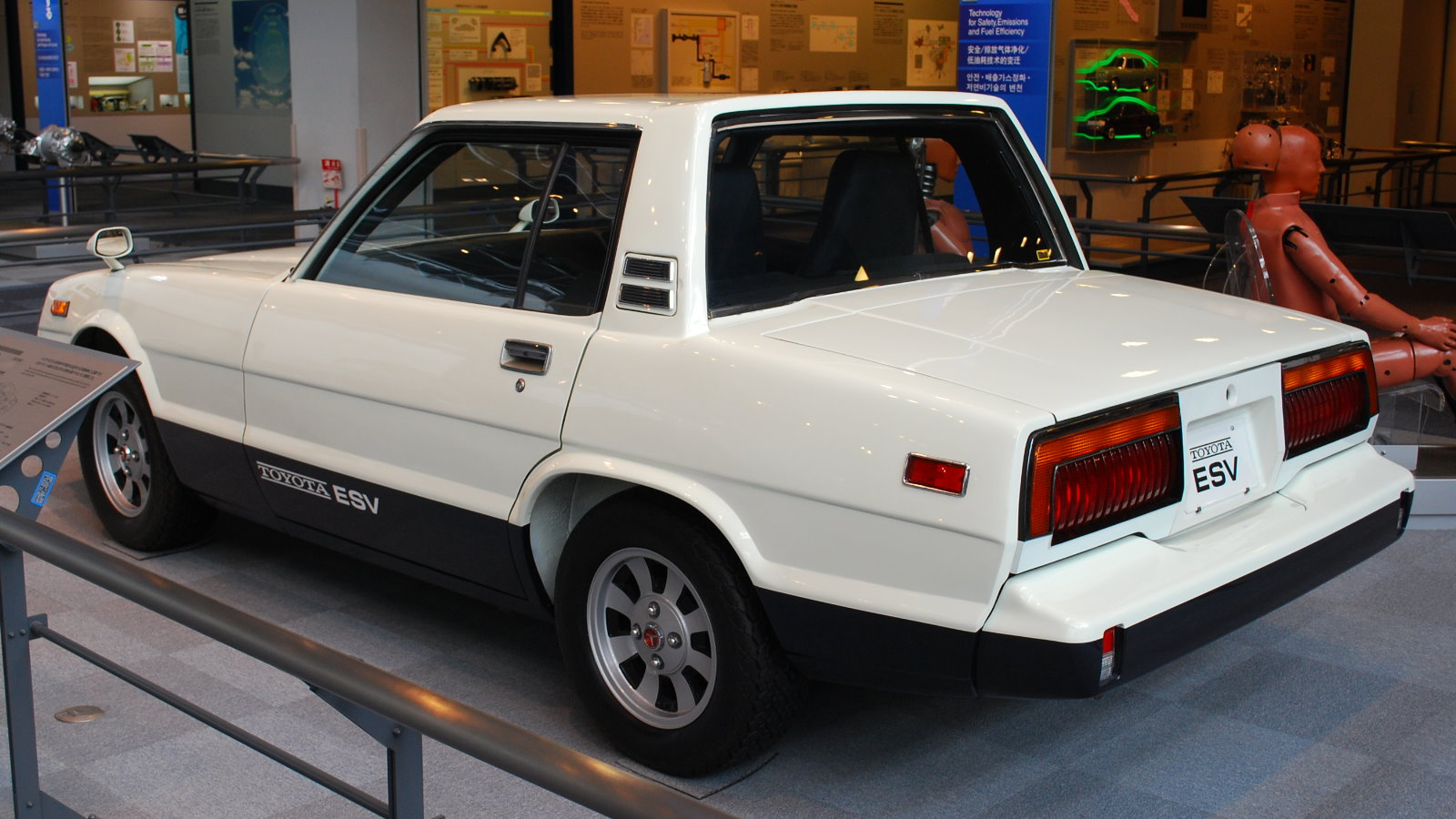
ESV

== EV2 (1973) ==
The EV2 was a concept vehicle created by Toyota in 1973. It is a small, electric vehicle and was introduced at the 1973 Tokyo Motor Show.

== F101 (1973) ==
Toyota F101

Overview
- Manufacturer: Toyota
- Also called: Toyota F110, Toyota F120
- Production: 1973

Powertrain
- Engine: 4-cylinder SOHC

Dimensions
- Length: 4,450 mm (175.2 in)
- Width: 1,617 mm (63.7 in)
- Height: 1,300 mm (51.2 in)

The Toyota F101 (later called F110 in 1977 and F120 in 1981) was a concept car introduced in 1973. The car, a wagon-type sedan, was shown at the 1971 Tokyo Motor Show. The gull-wing doors of the car caught people's attention. Toyota displayed the F101 concept, and promoted it as "the sedan of the future." With only 97 horsepower, the F101 used the same 2-liter engine found in the 1974 Corona. The oriental prototype featured four-wheel disc brakes and a fully independent suspension. The F101 became a prequel to the second generation Toyota Celica. By that time, the first generation Celica had already been produced for two years and sold well. The F101 was built for maximum efficiency. The body of the concept, blown in a wind tunnel, fully met the challenges of the time and worked for fuel efficiency. At the same time, the outlines of the car, combining straight lines with roundness, as well as possible fell into the trends of future years.

== Marinetta 10 (1973) ==
Toyota Marinetta 10

Overview
- Manufacturer: Toyota
- Production: 1973

Body and chassis
- Body style: Trailer

Dimensions
- Curb weight: 300 kg (661 lb)

The Marinetta 10 was a concept trailer made by Toyota and shown during the 1973 Tokyo Motor Show behind a Corona hardtop in a beach setting, complete with beach sand and palm trees.

The 1973 versions was very similar to the 1971 Marinetta. The fibreglass exteriors were unchanged but the bottom half was changed internally to be similar to a pop-up caravan. Once the boat half was removed, beds could be folded out to the left and right sides and a fold-out frame raised complete with a fabric covering. With the total trailer weighing 300 kg (661 lb), hydraulic brakes were used powered by the trailers own inertia when the tow car decelerates. The exterior was painted white with an orange stripe along the top of the boat and 'Marinetta 10' in white lettering inside the stripe (which would be upside-down and underwater when the boat is in use)

== Marine Cruiser (1973) ==
The Toyota Marine Cruiser truck was a concept seen at the 1973 Tokyo Motor Show. It includes water resistant seats, two radios, protective headlights, additional optics, heavy winch, cover for spare wheel, aluminum safety cage, and a mounted spotlight-seeker, and an interior wood trimmed as used for fishing boats. Under the hood was mounted 4-cyl diesel B-series engine.

== Century Gas Turbine Hybrid (1975) ==
Toyota Century Gas Turbine Hybrid

Overview
- Manufacturer: Toyota
- Production: 1975

Body and chassis
- Platform: G20 Century

Powertrain
- Engine: GT45 gas turbine with two electric motors

The Century Gas Turbine Hybrid was a Toyota Century with a GT45 gas turbine and electric motor, shown as a concept vehicle at the 1975 Tokyo Motor Show.

A GT45 gas turbine engine was mounted in a Toyota Century, one of the few Toyotas with an engine bay big enough. The engine was connected to an electrical generator connected to 20 batteries of 12 V each, which then drove two electric motors, one motor for the front left wheel and the second motor for the right front wheel. Using kerosene, 160 km/h (99 mph) could be reached and 120 km/h (75 mph) could be reached using the batteries alone.

The Century was first trialled in this manner in 1971 but not shown to the public until 1975. A similar system was trialled from 1971 on some Toyota buses.

Another version of the engine was shown at the 1977 Tokyo Motor Show (GT24), at the 1979 Tokyo Motor Show (in the Sports 800 Gas Turbine Hybrid) and another at the 1985 Tokyo Motor Show (Gas Turbine II in the Toyota GTV).

== MP–1 (1975) ==
Toyota MP–1

Overview
- Manufacturer: Toyota
- Production: 1975

Body and chassis
- Body style: 5-door wagon
- Layout: FR layout
- Platform: Crown

Powertrain
- Engine: M series I6 engine

The Toyota MP–1 (Multi–Purpose wagon) was a concept vehicle for a multi–purpose vehicle produced by Toyota and first shown at the 1975 Tokyo Motor Show. This van was unusual in being based on the Crown passenger car chassis instead of a commercial vehicle chassis. Tomica made a limited edition scale model of the MP–1.

Externally, the MP–1 resembles a van with a sharply sloped bonnet. The two front doors are normal hinged doors but the rear–most of the side doors slide backwards along rails. The entire rear of the MP–1 is a top hinged rear door. The passenger side sliding door also incorporated a lifting step to allow wheelchair access.

Internally, the front passenger can turn 360 degrees and the rear bench seat can be tipped 90 degrees to face forwards or backwards. A sunroof and refrigerator were included.

The MP–1 was meant to be FWD but time pressures forced Toyota to re–use the six–cylinder engine and RWD drive train from the Crown.

== CAL–1 (1977) ==
Toyota CAL-1

Overview
- Manufacturer: Toyota
- Production: 1977

Body and chassis
- Body style: 2-door Coupé

Dimensions
- Width: 1,650 mm (65.0 in)

Shown at the 1977 Tokyo Motor Show (Oct–Nov) and the 1978 Chicago Auto Show., the CAL-1 was based on the prototype Supra.

The CAL-1, Supra and the new generation of Celica were all designed at Calty, Toyota's California design studio. Even though the CAL-1 was designed in California, it was right hand drive and had Japanese front mounted mirrors.

The rear decking opened into a pair of rear seats and the rear window opened into a wind deflector for the rear passengers. Further portions of the rear decking could be removed to make it into a pickup.

== Experimental Aluminum Car (1977) ==
The Experimental Aluminum Car is a concept car made by Toyota in 1977. Toyota used Aluminium for the entire body of the car. The result of using this lightweight material allowed the weight reduction to improved efficiency. The car was powered by a 547cc engine and weighed only 450 kg.

== F110 (1977) ==
Produced in 1977.

== Sports 800 Gas Turbine Hybrid (1977) ==
Toyota Sports Gas Turbine Hybrid
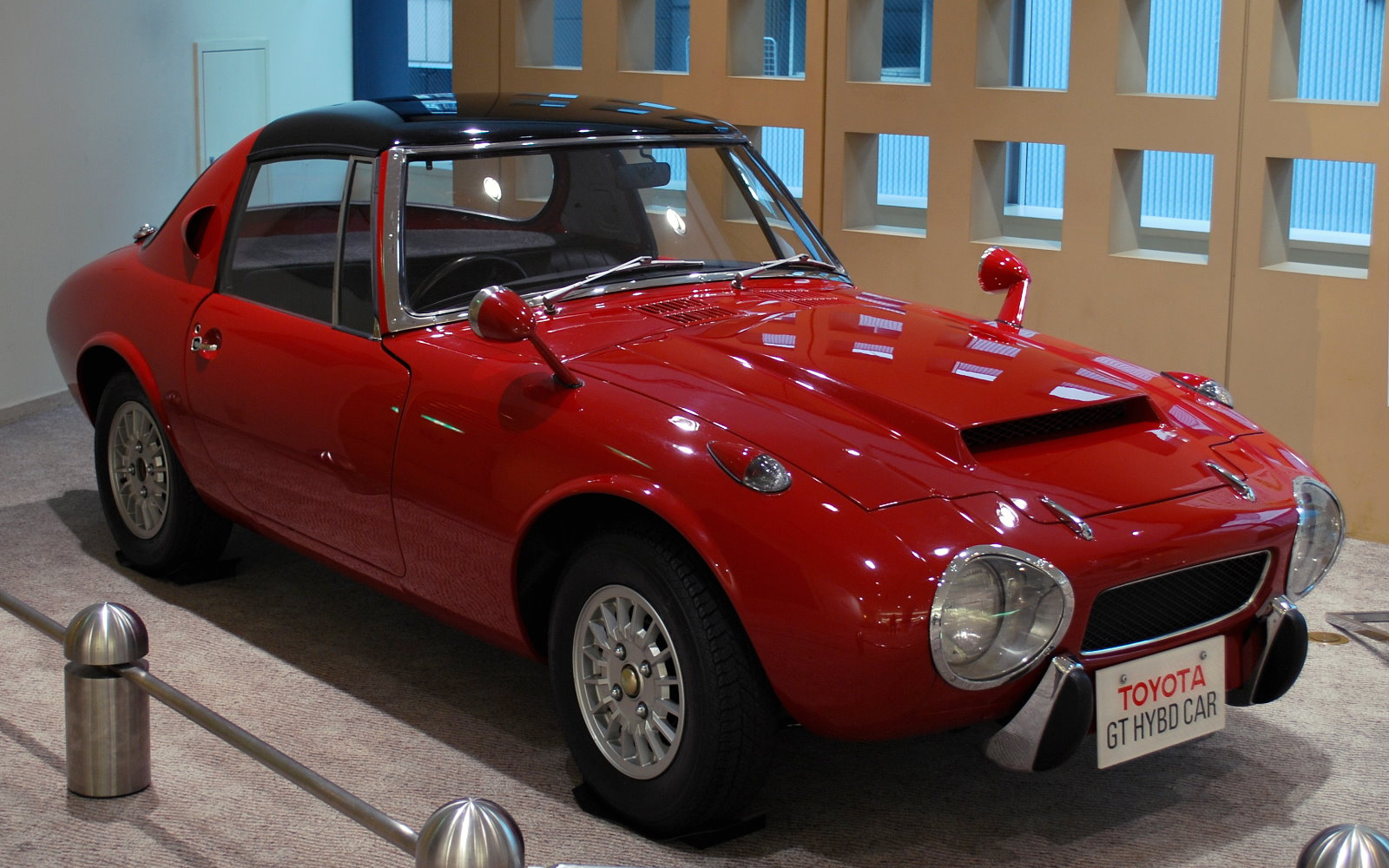

Overview
- Manufacturer: Toyota
- Production: 1977

Body and chassis
- Platform: Toyota Sports 800

Powertrain
- Transmission: 2-speed

Dimensions
- Wheelbase: 2,000 mm (78.7 in)
- Length: 3,580 mm (140.9 in)
- Width: 1,465 mm (57.7 in)
- Height: 1,175 mm (46.3 in)
- Curb weight: 1,000 kg (2,205 lb)

The Sports 800 Gas Turbine Hybrid was a concept vehicle based on the Toyota Sports 800, fitted with a gas turbine engine and first shown at the 1979 Tokyo Motor Show. The 30 bhp (22 kW) gas turbine engine was connected to a generator, which fed an electric motor connected to a 2 speed gearbox.

This vehicle was shown again in the nostalgia section of the 2009 Tokyo Motor Show. Minor changes had been made to it: the red roof had been changed to black, the black side mirrors had been changed to red, a large bonnet scoop had been added and the plain steel wheels had been replaced with alloy wheels. For unknown reasons, the placard next to the vehicle said that the vehicle had originally been shown at the 1977 Tokyo Motor Show instead of the 1979 show.

== CX–80, FCX–80 (1979) ==
Toyota CX-80, FCX-80

Overview
- Manufacturer: Toyota
- Production: 1979

Body and chassis
- Layout: FF

Dimensions
- Length: 3,500 mm (137.8 in)
- Width: 1,550 mm (61.0 in)
- Height: 1,250 mm (49.2 in)

The CX-80 (also known as the FCX-80) was a concept vehicle built by Toyota and shown at the October 1979 Tokyo Motor Show. It was designed to be an experimental city car for the future that would save fuel by being light and compact. The bonnet sloped sharply, with a pod in the middle for the headlights. Front wheel drive was used, leaving the cabin floor flat and the cabin spacious. The side windows were mounted high on the waistline but this was offset by having transparent cut-outs in the body's side panels.

== Family Wagon (1979) ==
Toyota Family Wagon

Overview
- Manufacturer: Toyota
- Production: 1979

Body and chassis
- Layout: FF

The Family Wagon was a concept vehicle built by Toyota based on the Liteace and shown at the October 1979 Tokyo Motor Show. It had three rows of seats, with the two seats in the second row able to swivel 180 degrees or to fold flat to form a continuous surface with one of the two seats in the third row. A small table was placed between the rightmost seats of the second and third rows. A rear-facing television was mounted in the roof just behind the front row of seats.

== Hilux RM-4D (1979) ==
The Toyota Hilux RM-4D was a concept version of the Toyota Hilux made in 1979. It was a special exhibit made exclusively for the 1979 Tokyo Motor Show. It was not planned to make production.

== See also ==
- Toyota concept vehicles (1935–1969)
- Toyota concept vehicles (1980–1989)
- Toyota concept vehicles (1990–1999)
- Toyota concept vehicles (2000–2009)
- Toyota concept vehicles (2010–2019)
- Toyota concept vehicles (2020–2029)
