= Toyota concept vehicles (1980–1989) =

Toyota Concept Vehicles produced between 1980 and 1989 include:

== HiLux RV-3 (1980) ==
Toyota HiLux RV-3

Overview
- Manufacturer: Toyota
- Also called: Toyota Pickup
- Production: 1980

Chronology
- Successor: Toyota Hilux

The Toyota HiLux RV-3 is a concept vehicle made by Toyota in 1980. It entered production as the third generation Hilux.

== DV-1 (1981) ==
The Toyota DV-1 was introduced in 1981. It is a Welcab style, and was shown at the Tokyo Motor Show. The car is designed for individuals with severe upper extremity disabilities. Based on the Toyota Corolla 1500SE passenger car, the DV-1 has been modified so that operations normally performed by the hands can be performed instead by other parts of the body. For example, the doors can be opened and closed with the feet. The car can be steered with the left leg. The shift lever, switches, parking brake and other devices can be operated with the right leg and right shoulder, and the turn signal switch with the head. The fully automatic air conditioner and radio respond to spoken commands. The latest Toyota technical advances are located throughout the DV-1. These include remote control door lock/unlock, automatic seatbelts, vehicle-speed-responsive door lock, headlights with automatic on/off and high and low beam use control, and "run flat tires" which can be driven on for short distances after punctures.

== EX-11 (1981) ==
Toyota EX-11

Overview
- Manufacturer: Toyota
- Production: 1981

Body and chassis
- Layout: FR
- Platform: Z10 Soarer
- Related: Toyota Soarer

Chronology
- Predecessor: Toyota Soarer

The Toyota EX-11 was a concept vehicle by Toyota shown at the 1981 Tokyo Motor Show. Based on the prototype Soarer, the EX-11 demonstrated advance electronics such as electronic engine and drive train management, colour monitors and fibre optic wiring.

== SV-2 (1981) ==
Toyota SV-2

Overview
- Manufacturer: Toyota
- Production: 1981

Body and chassis
- Layout: FR
- Platform: A60 Supra
- Related: Toyota Supra

Powertrain
- Engine: 2.8 L 5M-GEU I6

Chronology
- Predecessor: Toyota Supra

The Toyota SV-2 was a concept vehicle by Toyota shown at the 1981 Tokyo Motor Show. Based on the second-generation Supra, the SV-2 featured different styling, complete with a removable targa top and a maroon and white interior.

== RV-5 (1982) ==
Toyota RV-5

Overview
- Manufacturer: Toyota
- Production: 1982

Body and chassis
- Layout: F4
- Platform: L20 Tercel
- Related: Tercel

Powertrain
- Transmission: 5-speed manual

The Toyota RV-5 was a concept vehicle by Toyota shown at the Jan 1982 Tokyo Auto Salon and the March 1983 Geneva Motor Show. Based on the upcoming 4WD Tercel L20, the RV-5 was configured as a cross country mobile camera platform. The RV-5 was close to the released 4WD Tercel, with the main difference being that the large rear, side windows on the RV-5 could hinge upwards.

== CQ-1 (1983) ==
The Toyota CQ-1 was produced in 1983, and was based on the Toyota TownAce. The CQ-1 was a concept in automobile communications technology; meaning the vehicle boasted advanced technology for the 1980s.

== Palette, Y-1, Y-2, Y-3 (1983) ==
Toyota Palette

Overview
- Manufacturer: Toyota
- Also called: Toyota Y-1
- Production: 1983
- Designer: Studio Argo

Body and chassis
- Body style: 4-door coupe

Chronology
- Successor: Toyota AXV-II, Toyota Sera

The Toyota Palette was a concept vehicle made by Toyota in 1983. The Palette Y-2 was created in 1987, at the Tokyo Motor Show. The Y-2 was renamed the Toyota AXV-II. The Palette Y-3 was introduced in 1990, and was renamed the Toyota Sera.

== SV-3 (1983) ==
Toyota SV-3

Overview
- Manufacturer: Toyota
- Production: 1983

Body and chassis
- Body style: 2-door coupe
- Layout: MR
- Related: Toyota MR2

Powertrain
- Engine: 1.6 L 4A-GE I4

Chronology
- Successor: Toyota MR2

The SV-3 was a concept vehicle by Toyota shown at the 1983 Tokyo Motor Show. With minor changes it was put into production as the Toyota MR2.

== FX-1 (1983) ==
Toyota FX-1

Overview
- Manufacturer: Toyota
- Production: 1983

Body and chassis
- Layout: FR

Powertrain
- Engine: 2.0 L 1G-GE I6 twin-turbo (prototype)
- Transmission: 4-speed automatic

The FX-1 was a concept car by Toyota. It was first shown at the 1983 Tokyo Motor Show and also shown at the Geneva Motor Show in March 1984. It was a showcase for new technologies in driver controls, engine, suspension, materials and aerodynamics. Design cues from the FX-1 later ended up on the Toyota Camry XV20, built between 1996 and 2001.

== TAC3 (1983) ==
Toyota TAC3

Overview
- Manufacturer: Toyota
- Production: 1983

Body and chassis
- Layout: 4WD

The TAC3 was a 4WD concept car by Toyota, first shown at the 1983 Tokyo Motor Show. The driver sat in a central position, while two passengers sat behind in separate bucket seats. There was no roof but a rear roll bar provided roll over protection. The TAC3 was shown with a small trailer that also held 4 spare tyres on its towing arm.

== AXV (1985) ==
Toyota AXV

Overview
- Manufacturer: Toyota
- Production: 1985

Body and chassis
- Body style: 2 door sedan

Powertrain
- Engine: 1.1 L turbocharged diesel I3

Dimensions
- Curb weight: 650 kg (1,433 lb)

The AXV (Advanced Experimental Vehicle) was a concept vehicle by Toyota that was first shown at the October 1985 Tokyo Motor Show. Its goal was for ultra-low fuel consumption, to be under 650 kg in weight and to have the same interior volume as a small sedan.

The body was aerodynamically shaped, with Cd=0.26, while still seating four people. The bonnet, rear suspension arms and wheel rims were made from SMC (Sheet Moulding Compound), the roof was made from resin between steel sheets and the windows were made from polycarbonate resin.

The engine was a 1.1 litre 3 cylinder diesel. It used turbo-charging, direct injection and electronics to keep high performance levels while maintaining low fuel consumption.

== FXV (1985) ==
Toyota FXV

Overview
- Manufacturer: Toyota
- Production: 1985

Body and chassis
- Body style: 4 door sedan
- Layout: R4

Powertrain
- Engine: 2.0 L supercharged + turbocharged
- Transmission: 5 speed automatic

The FXV (Future eXperimental Vehicle) was a concept vehicle by Toyota that was first shown at the 1985 Tokyo Motor Show.

The FXV included both 4 wheel steering and 4 wheel drive with Electronic Skid Control.

The mid-mounted 2.0 L engine had both a supercharger and a turbocharger (with a ceramic turbine wheel), pistons made from magnesium fibre-reinforced metal (FRM), a distributor-less ignition system and a resin intake manifold.

The full colour computerised CRT displays had touch screens which could control the suspension, CD player, air conditioning, cellular phone and 8mm video display. Speed was projected onto a head-up display.

== MR2 Group B Prototype (1987) ==
Toyota's MR2 Group B Prototype was introduced in 1987. It was based on the Toyota 222D, but with added rally features, and is RWD.

== GTV (1987) ==
Toyota GTV

Overview
- Manufacturer: Toyota
- Production: 1987

Body and chassis
- Layout: FR
- Platform: T150 Carina

Powertrain
- Engine: Gas Turbine II
- Transmission: CVT

Dimensions
- Length: 4,724 mm (186.0 in)
- Width: 1,791 mm (70.5 in)
- Height: 1,326 mm (52.2 in)

The Toyota GTV (Gas Turbine Vehicle) was a concept vehicle by Toyota with a gas turbine engine. It was first shown at the October 1987 Tokyo Motor Show. A very sophisticated concept vehicle, it was based on the Toyota Carina, and was in fact a proof of concept vehicle slated initially for small-scale production.

A measure of Toyota's intent with the vehicle was its allowing journalists from Car Magazine to review the vehicle in 1986. Their view was favourable with regard to the overall performance of the vehicle, although the natural turbine lag of the engine did hurt the overall impression of the review. The CVT automatic gearbox did however endear the vehicle to testers - this gearbox has now become the cornerstone of Toyota automatic gearboxes, and the basis of the Toyota Prius gearbox. The GTV was also reviewed by Popular Science magazine.

The GTV used the Gas Turbine II engine. A one-stage turbine was used to drive the compressor while a second turbine was connected to the drive shaft. The second stage also took the place of the fluid flywheel (torque converter). Like the earlier Chrysler Turbine Car, the GTV had a de-coupled gas turbine (i.e. output was by a separate turbine) with a two-stage heat exchanger designed to reduce the exhaust gas temperature. The compressor turbine spun at up to 68,000 rpm while the output turbine spun at up to 65,000 rpm. A regenerator took waste heat and transferred it to the incoming air, increasing efficiency. The engine output was reduced by 10.13 before being mated to the gearbox, giving a maximum power of 148 hp (110 kW) at 5300 rpm and a maximum torque of 245.9 lb⋅ft (333 N⋅m).

Earlier versions of the Gas Turbine engine were shown at the Tokyo Motor Show in 1975 (in the Toyota Century) and 1977 (free standing).

== AXV-II (1987) ==
Toyota AXV-II

Overview
- Manufacturer: Toyota
- Production: 1987

Body and chassis
- Class: Sport compact car
- Body style: 3-door hatchback coupe
- Layout: FR
- Platform: P70 Starlet
- Doors: Butterfly

Powertrain
- Engine: 1.3 L 2E-ELU I4
- Transmission: 4 speed automatic

Dimensions
- Wheelbase: 2,300 mm (90.6 in)
- Length: 3,780 mm (148.8 in)
- Width: 1,650 mm (65.0 in)
- Height: 1,260 mm (49.6 in)

Chronology
- Successor: Toyota Sera

The AXV-II was a concept car built by Toyota that was first shown at the October 1987 Tokyo Motor Show.

The concept has butterfly doors and pivoted up to the front to allow passengers to exit from the car in places that ordinary conventional doors cannot handle. Gas filled struts kept the door in place when open. The doors covered the roof of the car as well as the sides, with the door glass forming part of the roof.

The hatchback was made entirely from glass that included the rear sides of the vehicle in a similar manner to the early Mazda RX-7.

Mechanical components (engine, gearbox, suspension) were the same as those in the Starlet.

The AXV-II went into production as the Toyota Sera in March 1990.

== FXV-II (1987) ==
Toyota FXV-II

Overview
- Manufacturer: Toyota
- Production: 1987

Body and chassis
- Layout: F4

Powertrain
- Engine: 3.8 L V8

The FXV-II (Future eXperimental Vehicle II) was a concept vehicle by Toyota that was first shown at the October 1987 Tokyo Motor Show.

It had an all alloy, quad cam, 32 valve, EFI, 3.8 litre V8 engine. It used a prototype of the 1UZ-FE which was later used in the Lexus LS400 (some 1UZ-FE prototypes from about 1987 were the same size). The radiator cooling fans were hydraulically driven under computer control.

At the time, the drive train was Toyota's only 4WD system using a V8. The front/rear split was normally 30/70 but could change up to 50/50. A 4 speed electronically controlled automatic gearbox was used. Electronic Skid Control and Traction Control were included.

The Pegasus (Precision Engineered Geometrically Advanced SUSpension) was a prototype for the new Toyota TEMS suspension used on later Cressidas, Soarers and Supras.

The FXV-II included 4 wheel steering and had a maximum speed of 260 km/h (160 mph) and a drag coefficient of Cd=0.26.

The interior included GPS navigation and computerised CRT displays.

Images of FXV-II

== EV-30 (1987) ==
Toyota EV-30

Overview
- Manufacturer: Toyota
- Production: 1987

Dimensions
- Length: 2,100 mm (82.7 in)
- Width: 1,320 mm (52.0 in)
- Height: 1,140–1,525 mm (44.9–60.0 in)

The EV-30 was a concept two-seat electric vehicle by Toyota that was first shown at the October 1987 Tokyo Motor Show. .

Th body was made from resin and was shown in both open (no roof) and closed (with a roof) forms, although both forms had no doors. The front bumper sloped back and upwards, running into the cabin to form the dashboard. The rear bumper sloped forward and down, running into the cabin to form the side armrests. The construction was lightweight, being designed as a LSV for use inside shopping malls, hospitals and similar environments.

Zinc-bromide batteries of 106 V were used to power an AC induction motor. This gave it a top speed of 43 km/h (27 mph). When driven at 30 km/h (19 mph) it had a range of 165 km (103 mi). The batteries could be charged from a standard Japanese 100 V mains socket.

== Soarer Aero Cabin (1989) ==
Toyota Soarer Aero Cabin

Overview
- Manufacturer: Toyota
- Production: 1989
- Assembly: Japan

Body and chassis
- Class: Mid-size car
- Body style: 2 door sports car

Powertrain
- Engine: Turbocharged 3.0L
- Transmission: 4 speed automatic

Dimensions
- Wheelbase: 2670 mm
- Length: 4675 mm
- Width: 1725 mm
- Height: 1345 mm
- Curb weight: 1610 kg

Chronology
- Predecessor: Toyota Soarer

The Toyota Soarer Aero Cabin (Aerocabin) is a sports car based on the Toyota Soarer, and produced in 1989. It is a Japan only model, and 500 were produced. It is estimated that 490 are still in good condition. It includes an electric folding roof, power windows, power locks, leather seats, folding mirrors, keyless entry, digital dash, cruise control, and automated climate control. Its emblem is a horse with wings.

== 4500GT (1989) ==
Toyota 4500GT

Overview
- Manufacturer: Toyota Motor Company
- Production: 1989
- Assembly: Japan

Body and chassis
- Class: Grand Tourer
- Body style: 2+2 coupe
- Layout: FR

Powertrain
- Engine: 4.5 L 1UZ-FE-based V8
- Transmission: 6 speed manual, rear mounted

Dimensions
- Curb weight: 1,450 kg (3,197 lb)

Chronology
- Successor: Toyota Soarer; Lexus SC400 Coupe

The Toyota 4500GT concept debuted at the 1989 Frankfurt Motor Show. It is a 2-door, 2+2 coupe that signalled Toyota's entry into the competitive upper-level luxury coupe class. Although the car's controversial styling was almost universally disliked by the show-goers at the Frankfurt show, its mechanical components were far more relevant, as they carried over much more closely to its production offspring than the styling did.

Toyota claimed the 4500GT was capable of transporting 4 passengers and their luggage comfortably at a speed of 300 km/h (186 mph). To achieve this, the car had to be both efficient, and powerful. The body's unusual shape (dropping snout, flat and abrupt rear end) yielded an extremely low coefficient of drag for the time period of Cd=0.29.

The power plant was quite impressive. A derivative of Toyota's then-new 1UZ-FE V8, the 4500GT boasted an additional 500 cc of displacement over the production unit, twin overhead camshafts per cylinder bank, and 5 valves per cylinder. This high tech masterpiece produced 220 kW (295 bhp) at 6600 rpm and 390 N⋅m (288 lb⋅ft) at 4800 rpm. This alloy V8 was mated with a 6 speed manual transmission, which was mounted at the rear with the differential to even out the front/rear weight balance.

The suspension used double control arms front and rear. The front utilized upper A arms and lower L arms, and the rear used upper L arms and lower A arms for increased camber to promote stability in high speed corners.

No acceleration testing was ever done on the car, but with 220 kW (295 bhp) and a curb weight of 1,450 kg (3,197 lb), the rear-wheel drive 4500GT could be reasonably expected to achieve 0–97 km/h (0–60 mph) in less than 7 seconds.

The 4500GT never made it directly to the showroom; however, it was the predecessor to the third generation Toyota Soarer (also known as the first generation Lexus SC). The Soarer/SC400 utilized a milder production version of the 4500GT's V8, a 4.0 L with 250 hp (186 kW). The styling of the Soarer/SC400 was in the eyes of many much more cohesive and attractive, and it went on to great commercial success on the mechanical backbone of the 4500GT concept.

== Camp Mate (1989) ==
Toyota Camp Mate

Overview
- Manufacturer: Toyota Motor Company
- Production: 1989
- Assembly: Japan

Body and chassis
- Class: campervan
- Body style: van
- Layout: 4WD

Powertrain
- Engine: 2.0 L 2C

The Toyota Camp Mate is a RV based on the Toyota LiteAce (TownAce). The concept was introduced in 1989, and was only ¥1,250,724. It features the regular LiteAce body, but includes an expandable side, adding an additional 0.9 m (3 ft) of space inside. The Camp Mate can fit up to 10 people, and has room for 2 beds, a small kitchen, a living room, and 1 bathroom. It is powered by the 2C 2.0 litre diesel engine, and uses 4WD.

== RAV-Four (1989) ==
Toyota RAV-Four

Overview
- Manufacturer: Toyota
- Production: 1989

Body and chassis
- Body style: 4-door SUV
- Layout: 4-wheel drive
- Related: Toyota RAV4

Powertrain
- Engine: four-cylinder 2.0-liter engine

Dimensions
- Length: 3695 mm
- Width: 1695 mm
- Height: 1660 mm

The Toyota RAV-Four is a concept vehicle produced by Toyota in 1989, and shown at the Tokyo Motor Show. It entered production as the Toyota RAV4. In the front, it includes a retractable winch.

== See also ==
- Toyota concept vehicles (1935–1969)
- Toyota concept vehicles (1970–1979)
- Toyota concept vehicles (1990–1999)
- Toyota concept vehicles (2000–2009)
- Toyota concept vehicles (2010–2019)
- Toyota concept vehicles (2020–2029)
