= Toyota U engine =

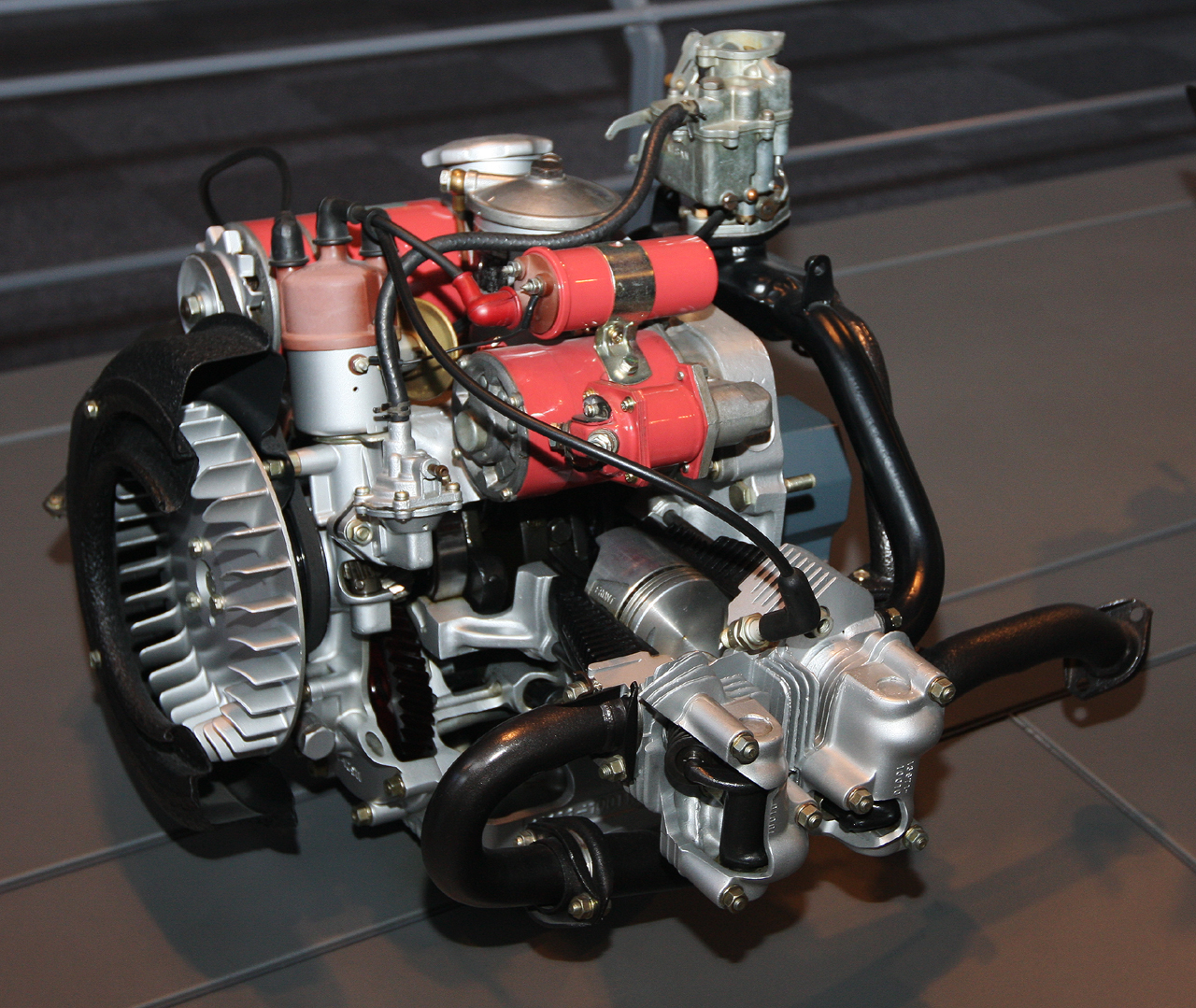

Overview
- Manufacturer: Toyota
- Production: 1961–1976; 2012–2021

Layout
- Configuration: Flat-twin; Flat-four

The Toyota U engine is a series of flat engines produced by Toyota. The original version of this engine was produced in the 1960s and 1970s in flat-twin configuration. The engine series was extended in 2012 for the engine derived from the Subaru flat-four for the Toyota 86.

== U ==
U

Overview
- Manufacturer: Toyota
- Production: 1961–1966

Layout
- Configuration: Flat-2
- Displacement: 697 cc (43 cu in)
- Cylinder bore: 78 mm (3.071 in)
- Piston stroke: 73 mm (2.874 in)

Combustion
- Cooling system: Air-cooled

Output
- Power output: 28–32 PS (21–24 kW)
- Torque output: 5.4 kg⋅m (53.0 N⋅m; 39.1 lb⋅ft)

The 697 cc U engine was produced from 1961 through 1966. The power was increased from 28 to 32 PS (21 to 24 kW; 28 to 32 hp) from engine number U-184170 onwards. It was exclusively installed in the Toyota Publica family of vehicles.

== 2U ==
2U
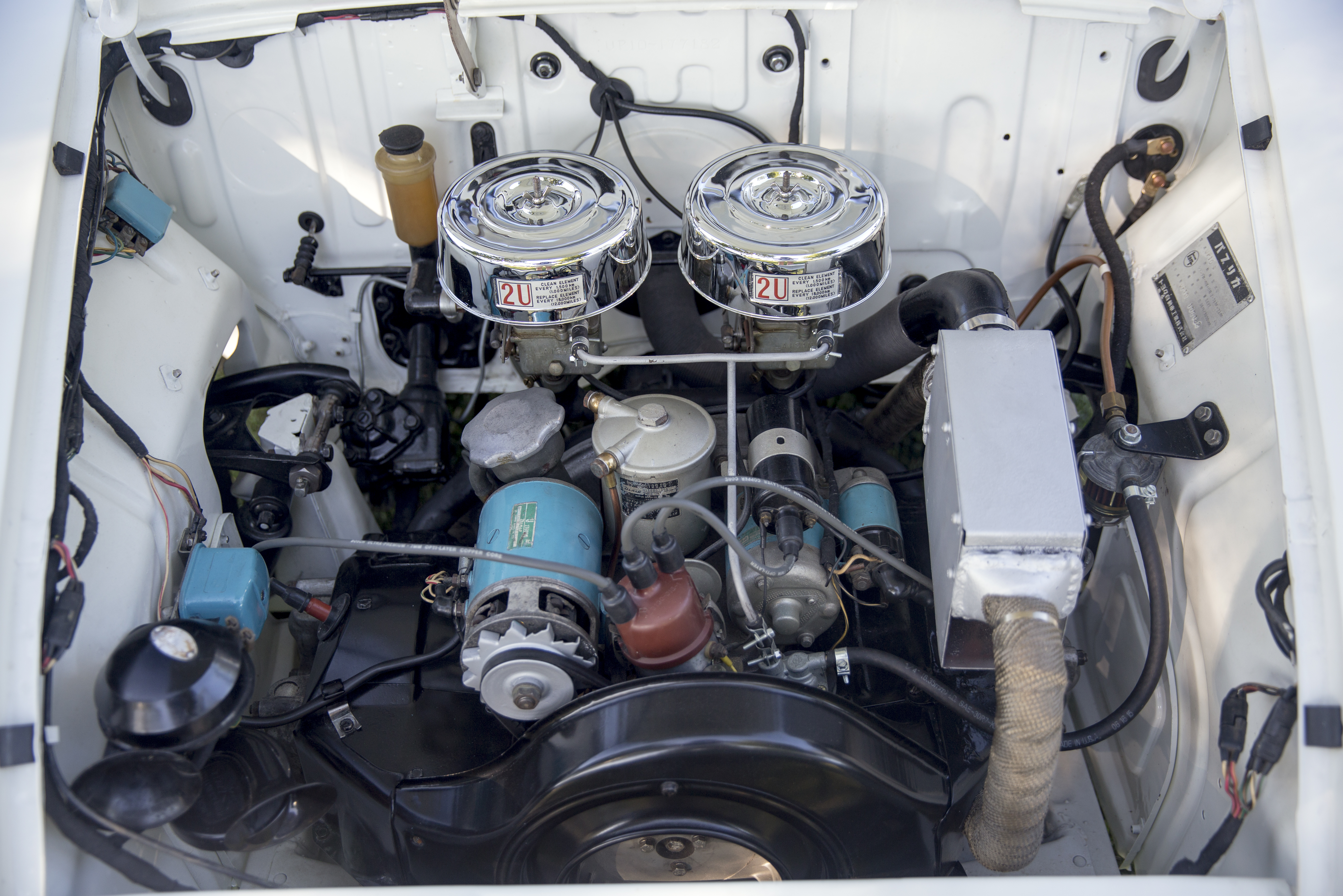
- Twin-carb 2U engine

Overview
- Manufacturer: Toyota
- Production: 1965–1976

Layout
- Configuration: Flat-2
- Displacement: 790 cc (48 cu in)
- Cylinder bore: 83 mm (3.268 in)
- Piston stroke: 73 mm (2.874 in)

Combustion
- Cooling system: Air-cooled

The 790 cc, 45 PS (33 kW) 2U was produced from 1965 through 1969, while the similar 2U-B was produced from 1966 through 1976. Output for the 2U-B when fitted to the Publica is 49 PS (36 kW) at 5,400 rpm. When installed in the Toyota MiniAce (UP100) minitruck and bus series, the engine only produces 36 PS (26 kW) at 4,600 rpm. This version has an 8.2:1 compression ratio. The 2U-C used in some models of the Publica 20 series produced 40 PS (29 kW; 39 hp) at 5,000 rpm. It was also installed in the Publica-derived sports car, called the Toyota Sports 800.

== 4U ==
4U
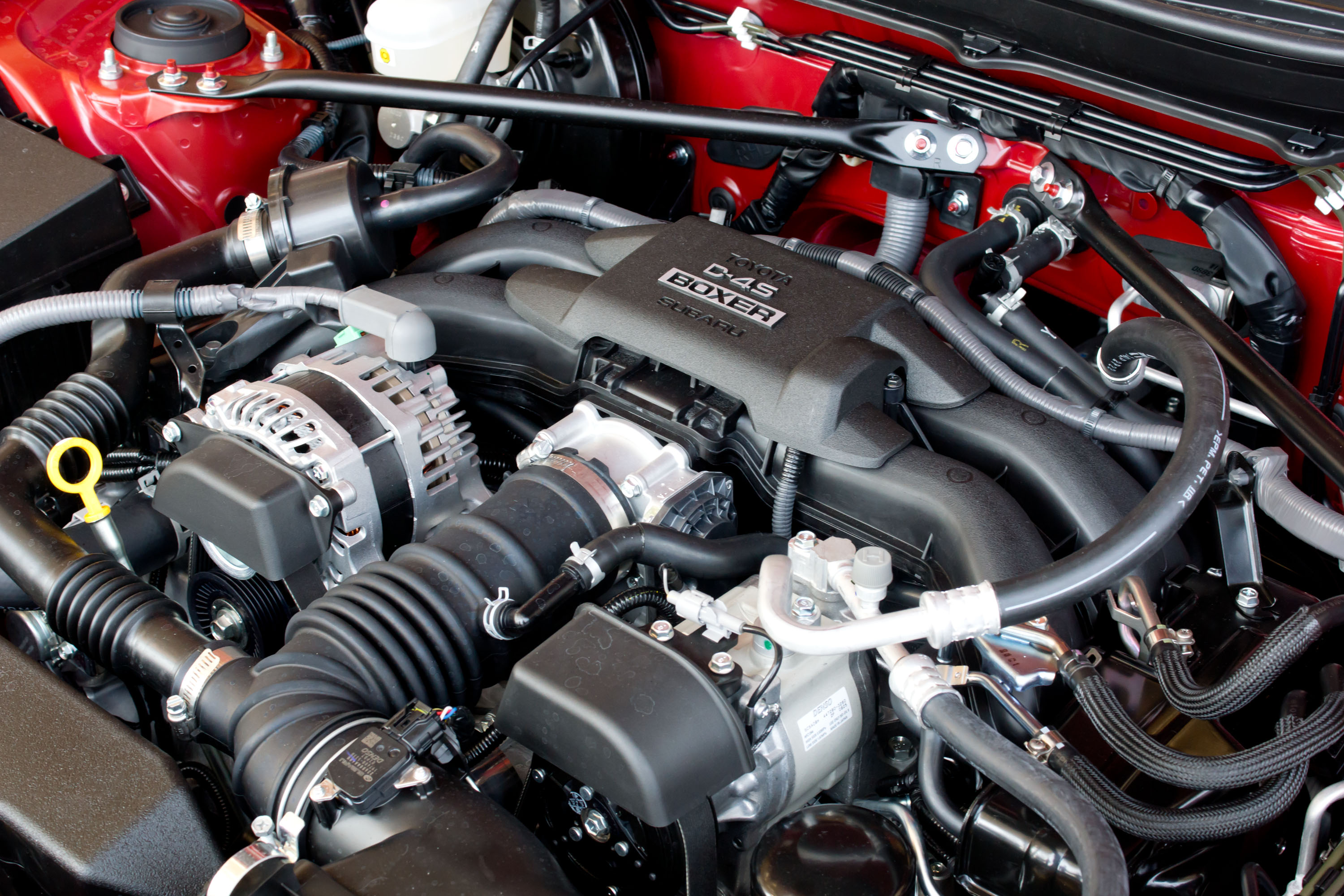

Overview
- Manufacturer: Subaru
- Also called: FA20D
- Production: 2012–2021

Layout
- Configuration: Flat-4
- Displacement: 2.0 L; 121.9 cu in (1,998 cc)
- Cylinder bore: 86 mm (3.39 in)
- Piston stroke: 86 mm (3.39 in)
- Compression ratio: 12.5:1

Combustion
- Fuel system: Direct injection and Multi-Port injection
- Fuel type: Gasoline
- Cooling system: Water-cooled

Output
- Power output: 200 PS (147 kW; 197 hp)
- Torque output: 205 N⋅m (151 lb⋅ft)

Chronology
- Successor: FA24D

Appearing in the Toyota 86 (also known as the Toyota GT 86 in Europe, Scion FR-S in the US and Subaru BRZ), the 4U-GSE is a boxer type engine with four cylinders and a bore and stroke of 86 mm (3.39 in). The engine is a Subaru designed-and-built flat-four engine called the FA20D, with a Toyota engine code. The engine is built at Subaru's Oizumi Plant in Ota, Gunma. It features Toyota's D4-S direct and port injection systems, with a maximum power rating of 200 PS (147 kW; 197 hp) at 7000 rpm and a maximum torque rating of 205 N⋅m (151 lb⋅ft) at 6600 rpm. The compression ratio is 12.5:1. In 2016, for the 2017 model year, power was increased to 208 PS (153 kW; 205 hp) when equipped with a manual transmission.

The 4U-GSE was discontinued in 2021, following the introduction of the second-generation Toyota 86 (also known as the Toyota GR86) and Subaru BRZ, which uses a 2.4-liter FA24D. Unlike the FA20, it does not use a Toyota engine code.

== See also ==
- List of Toyota engines
