= Strother MacMinn =

American car designer

- Born: 1918
- Died: January 19, 1998 (age 79); Pasadena, California
- Occupations: Car designer, educator, and motoring journalist
- Employer(s): General Motors, Henry Dreyfuss, Toyota's Calty Design Research
- Known for: Instructor at Art Center College of Design

Strother MacMinn (1918 – January 19, 1998) was an American car designer, author, and educator. While noted for his contributions to Road & Track, Motor Trend, and Automobile Quarterly and for helping found Toyota's Calty Design Research studio in California, MacMinn was widely known for an automotive design teaching career at Pasadena's Art Center College of Design that spanned fifty years — noted students include J Mays, Chris Bangle and Wayne Cherry.

Former Vice President of Design for General Motors Chuck Jordan reflected that "if you are in a car today, Mac probably influenced its design," saying also that "no one influenced car design more" than MacMinn.

== Background ==
Growing up in Pasadena, MacMinn befriended Frank Hershey, who worked for Murphy Body Company. When Frank moved on to work for GM, he helped MacMinn get his first job at the age of 17 in the Buick studio at General Motors Art and Color Section.

== Career ==
In 1937, Harley Earl assigned MacMinn to a new studio to develop the Opel Kapitän. MacMinn left GM before World War II and then returned for a short time after the war ended. He also worked for Frank Spring at Hudson.

After the war, MacMinn worked for the industrial designer Henry Dreyfuss. In 1948, he began teaching at the Art Center College of Design and remained there for 50 years.

In 1973, he helped found Toyota's Calty Design Research and remained with them until 1983.

MacMinn wrote for publications such as Road & Track, Motor Trend, Automobile Quarterly, and Sports Car International, and for museum catalogs. He was the chief honorary judge for several years at the Pebble Beach Concours d'Elegance.

== Notable designs ==
- 1938 Opel Kapitän
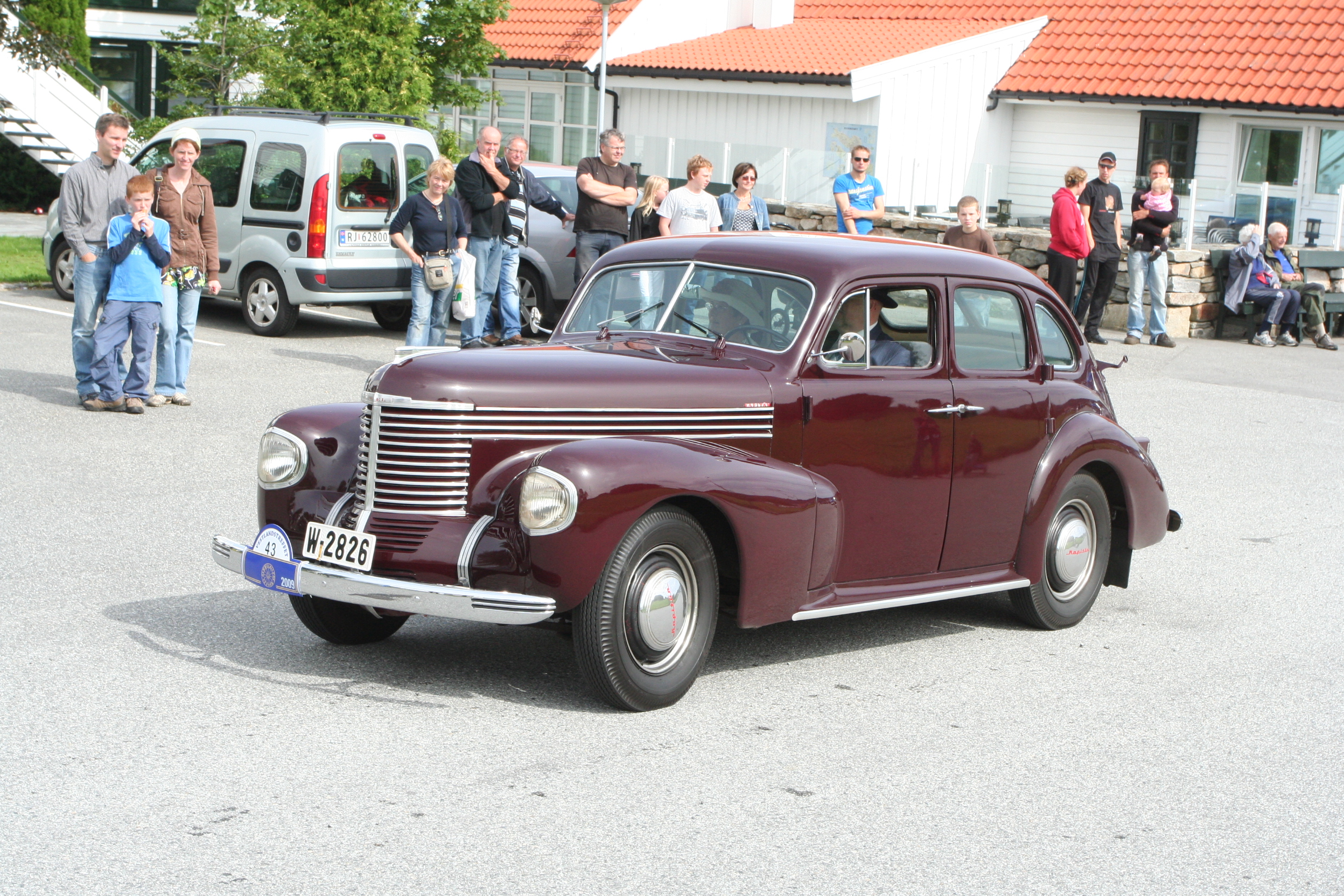
  1939 Opel Kapitän
- MacMinn's LeMans Coupe

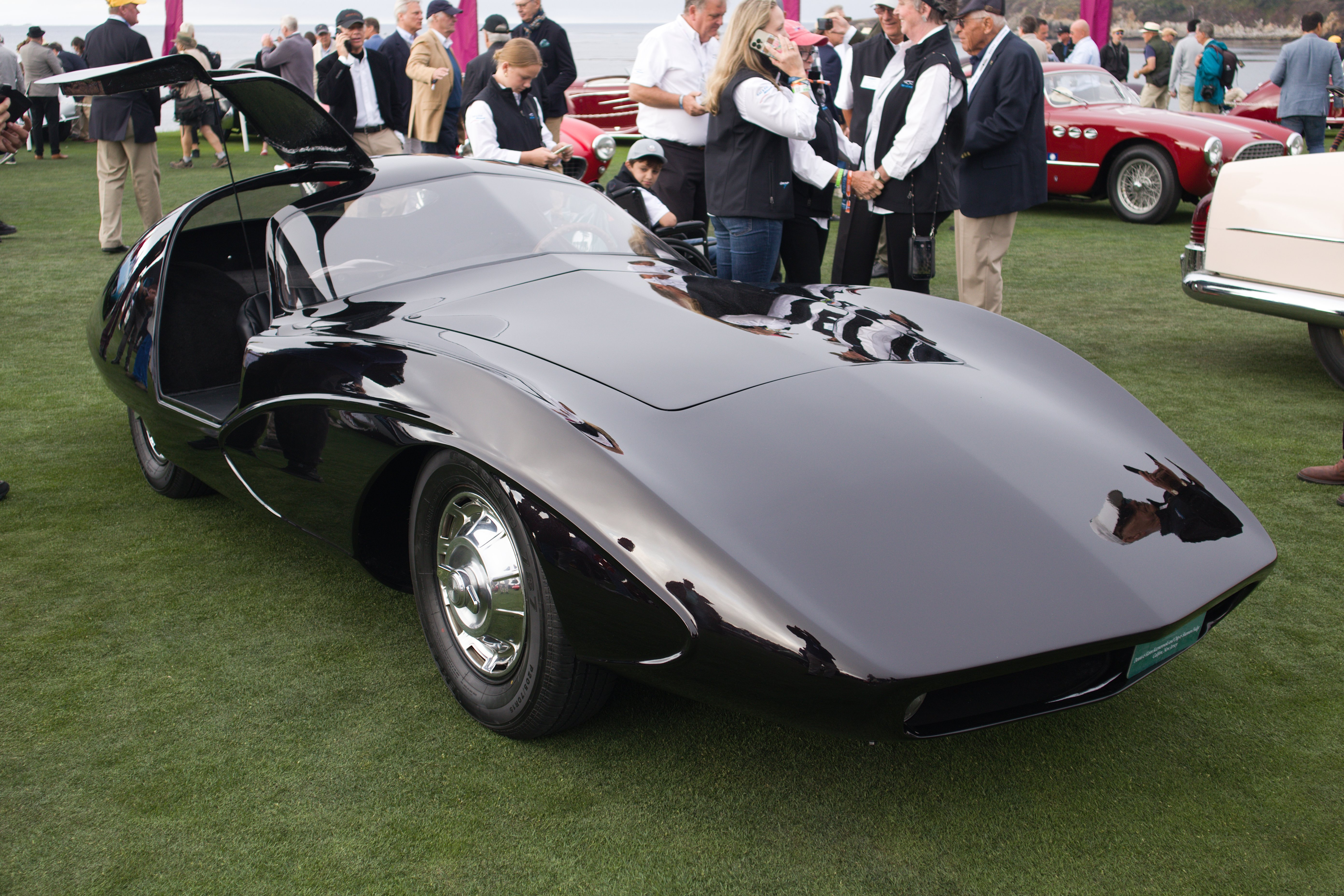
1958 MacMinn Le Mans Coupe
