= Calty Design Research =

Toyota design studio

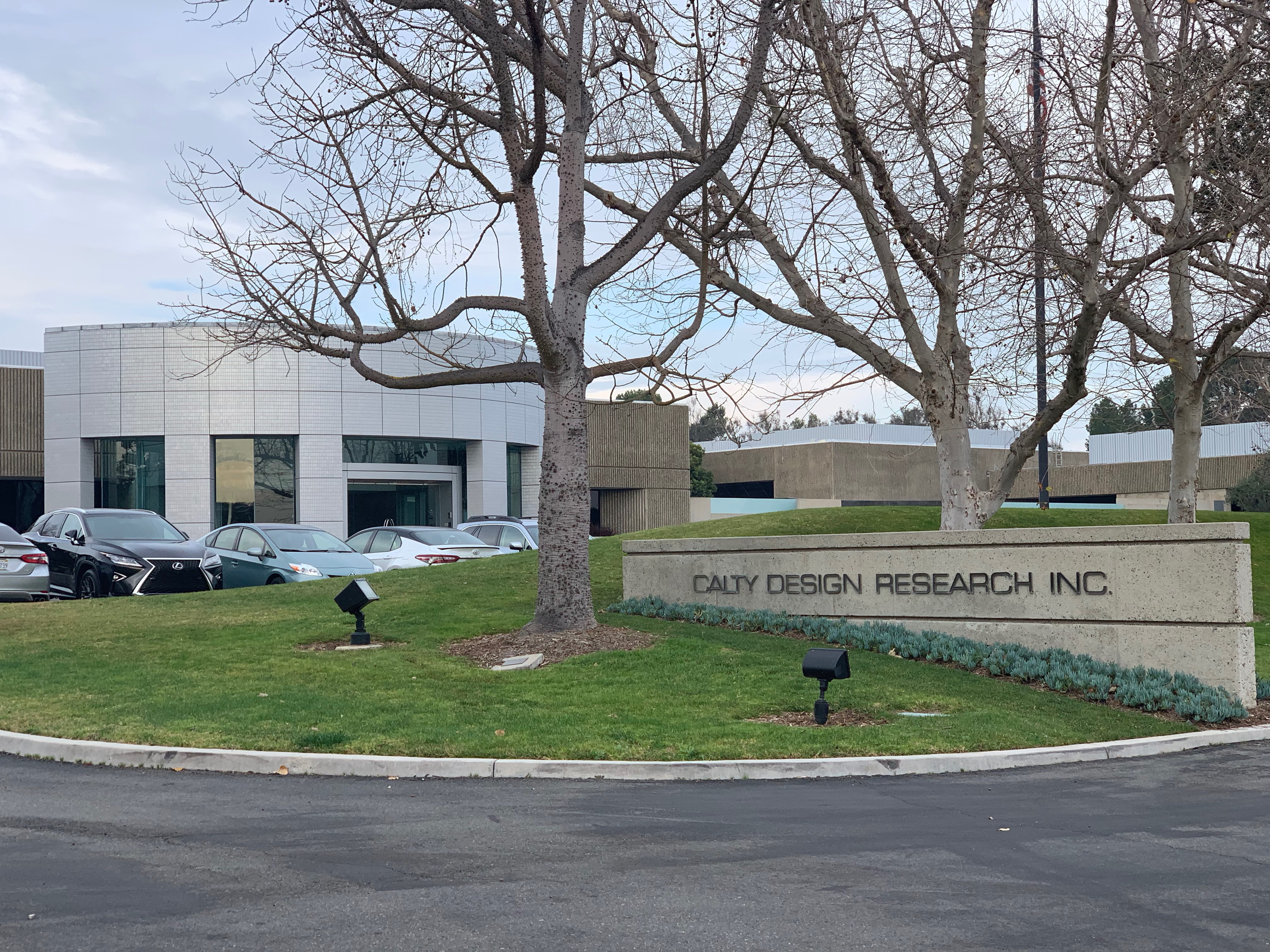
Calty Design Research Office in Newport Beach, CA

Calty Design Research Incorporated (also simply known as Calty) is a Toyota design studio established in 1973. They have two facilities: one in Newport Beach, California for concept designs, and another in Ann Arbor, Michigan for production designs. Calty provides both interior and exterior styling proposals for future Toyota vehicles and advanced design, production color and wheel design concepts for Toyota's product development operations.

Calty was initially created by Noritsuna Watanabe and David Stollery in 1973 at El Segundo, California. In 1976, Toyota sent Kazuo Morohoshi to rebuild the design center into a much stronger entity. Morohoshi was an assistant manager in Toyota who had recent completed work on the third generation Corolla and the Tercel and Corsa. His task was to build a long term design center in America to cater for American tastes and styles rather than catering to Japanese tastes and styles. Morohoshi had to develop both the direction for the new center and physical realities such as selecting the building, fitting it out and hiring staff. He choose to staff it with Americans, even though there were often cultural misunderstandings between himself and the American staff for a while. After one year under Morohoshi's management, Calty started working on the second generation Celica, aimed at the American market. American sales soon picked up as a result of the styling being aim at American tastes.

With the aid of design consultant and longtime Art Center faculty member Strother MacMinn, pure research was also undertaken in the form of concept cars. These paved the way for features incorporated into future Toyota cars. Feedback about the concept cars also allowed Toyota to gauge how American audiences perceived styling issues, which were often different from how the Japanese perceived them.

Morohoshi was called back to Japan in 1983 to head up Advanced Design at the Nagoya Design Division in Japan. The building he choose for Calty in Newport Beach is still being used by Calty.

When Toyota decided to build a luxury car (the Lexus LS400), it was aimed at the 43 year old white American male earning $100,000 per year (in 1987 dollars). A team of Japanese designers was sent to California to discover what this demographic looked for in a car and how it reflected their lifestyle. This team worked closely with Calty. As representatives of the target market, Calty was also involved in the exterior and interior design. However, Calty's sporty designs came into conflict with executives in Japan, who favored a more conservative car that appealed to middle-aged Japanese executives. Calty was also involved with the design of the new Lexus dealerships and the early training of these new dealers.

Toyota's design centers around the world often participated together to design new cars. For example, in February 1996 there was a competition among the design centers for the design of the first generation Prius. The Calty design was chosen, although the detailed work to turn it into a production car was done by Development Center 2 in Japan.

Here is a time line (model years) and list of vehicles Calty has contributed to:

- 2025 Toyota 4Runner
- 2024 Toyota Land Cruiser
- 2018 Toyota Camry NASCAR
- 2018 Toyota Camry (XV70)
- 2015 Toyota Camry NASCAR
- 2014 Toyota FT-1 concept
- 2013 Toyota Avalon
- 2013 Toyota Camry NASCAR
- 2013 Lexus GS interior
- 2011 Scion tC
- 2011 Toyota Sienna
- 2009 Toyota Venza
- 2008 Toyota Highlander
- 2007 Toyota Tundra
- 2007 Toyota FT-HS concept
- 2006 Toyota F3R concept
- 2005 Scion t2B concept
- 2005 Toyota Avalon
- 2004 Toyota FTX concept
- 2004 Lexus LF-C concept
- 2003 Lexus LF-X concept
- 2003 Toyota FJ Cruiser concept
- 2002 Toyota Matrix
- 2001 Toyota RSC concept
- 2001 Toyota RAV4
- 2001 Toyota Highlander
- 2000 Toyota Celica
- 2000 Toyota Avalon
- 1999 Toyota Solara
- 1997 Toyota Prius
- 1997? Toyota Solara convertible concept
- 1995 Lexus FLV concept
- 1995 Toyota Avalon
- 1995 Toyota Tacoma
- 1991 Lexus SC/Third-Generation Toyota Soarer
- 1990 Toyota Previa/Estima/Tarago
- 1990 Toyota Celica
- 1989 Toyota MX21 concept
- 1985 Toyota FXV-II concept
- 1979 Toyota Hilux
- 1978? Toyota FXV concept
- 1978 Toyota Celica
- 1977 Toyota F100 concept
- 1977 Toyota CAL-1 concept

== See also ==
- Toyota Motor Engineering & Manufacturing North America
