= Toyota FT-HS =

Toyota FT-HS Concept
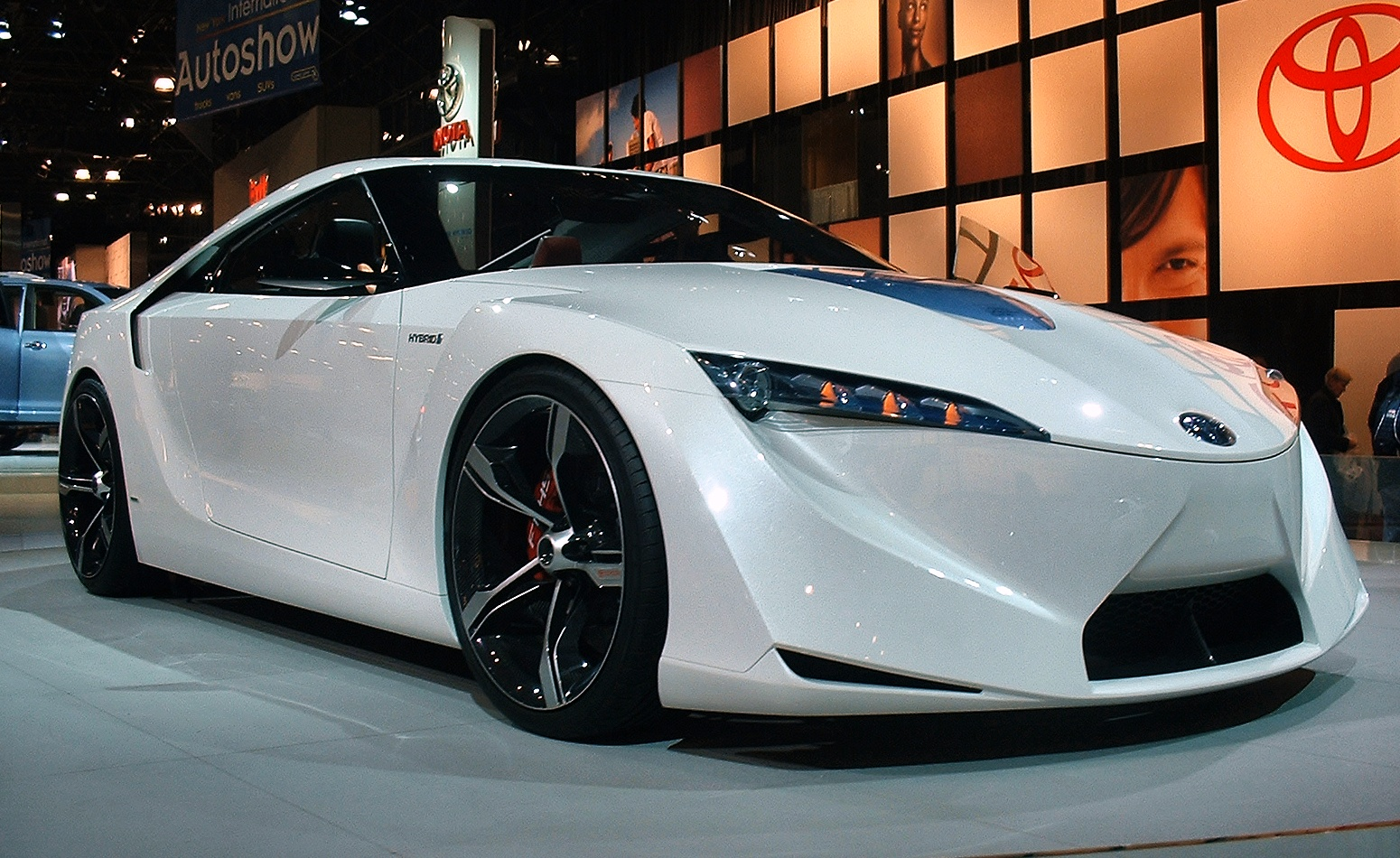

Overview
- Manufacturer: Toyota
- Production: 2007

Body and chassis
- Class: Concept car
- Body style: 2-door 2+2 coupé
- Layout: FR layout

Powertrain
- Engine: 3.5L V6 hybrid electric
- Transmission: 4-speed automatic

Dimensions
- Wheelbase: 104.33 in (2,650 mm)
- Length: 170.27 in (4,325 mm)
- Width: 73.23 in (1,860 mm)
- Height: 50.79 in (1,290 mm)

Chronology
- Predecessor: Toyota Supra (A80)
- Successor: Toyota FT-86; Toyota FT-1

The Toyota FT-HS is a hybrid sports car concept introduced at the 2007 North American International Auto Show. Calty Design Research designed the concept. FT-HS stands for Future Toyota Hybrid Sport.

The goal of the rear wheel drive hybrid powertrain is to produce 400 hp (298 kW) and achieve 0-60 mph (97 km/h) in around 4 seconds. This is accomplished by combining a 3.5 L V6 and an electric motor in a manner similar to the Lexus GS450h. Unlike the GS (and virtually all other current hybrids), a production version of the FT-HS would make use of a capacitor system designed specifically for quick charging and increased performance. Since the debut of this concept, Toyota has exhibited such technology in the Supra HV-R race car.

The 2+2 vehicle features a unique retractable roof similar to a targa top. The rear seats would be folded down when the roof is retracted, however.

In spite of the FT-HS being only a concept vehicle, Toyota's desired starting price for such a vehicle is stated to be in the mid $30,000 range.

An August 2008 article from Automotive News indicated that a production version was no longer being considered. However, a January 2009 article from Edmunds Inside Line states that "the V6 Supra replacement is still in the pipeline and is set for an early 2011 debut". The FT-HS concept was eventually succeeded in 2014 by the Toyota FT-1 concept, which inspired the fifth generation Toyota Supra that went into production in 2019. Many of the FT-HS concept's styling cues were also used in the Toyota 86 series developed jointly by Toyota and Subaru.

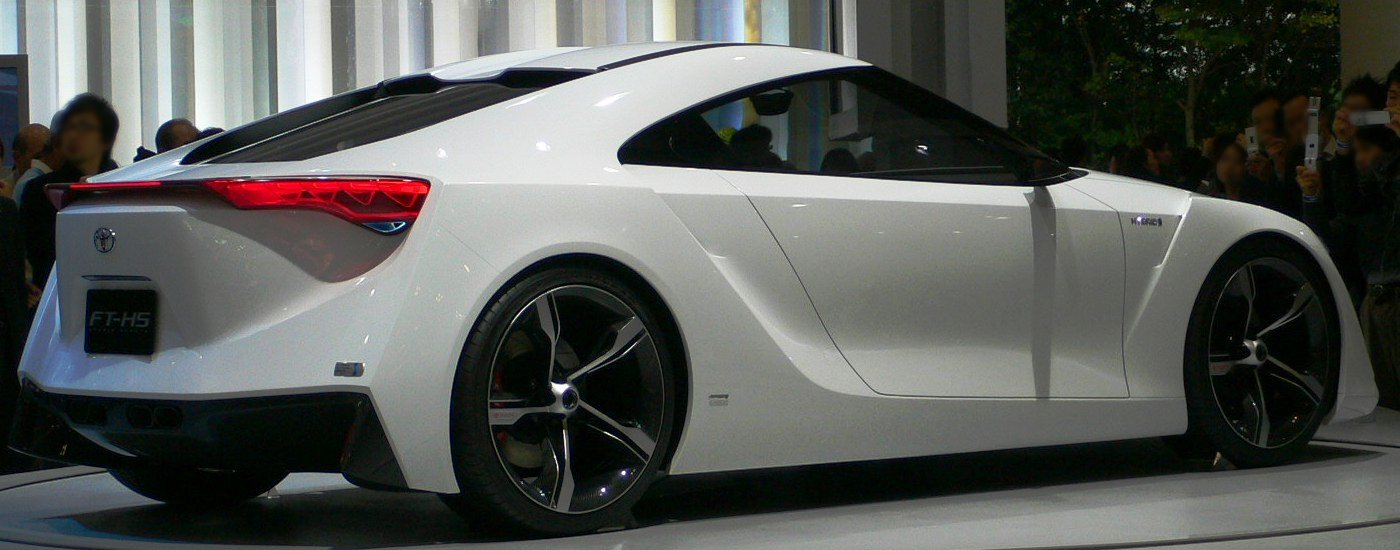
Rear shot of the Toyota FT-HS

== See also ==
- Toyota concept vehicles, 2000-2009
