= Toyota Sienna =

Minivan model by Toyota

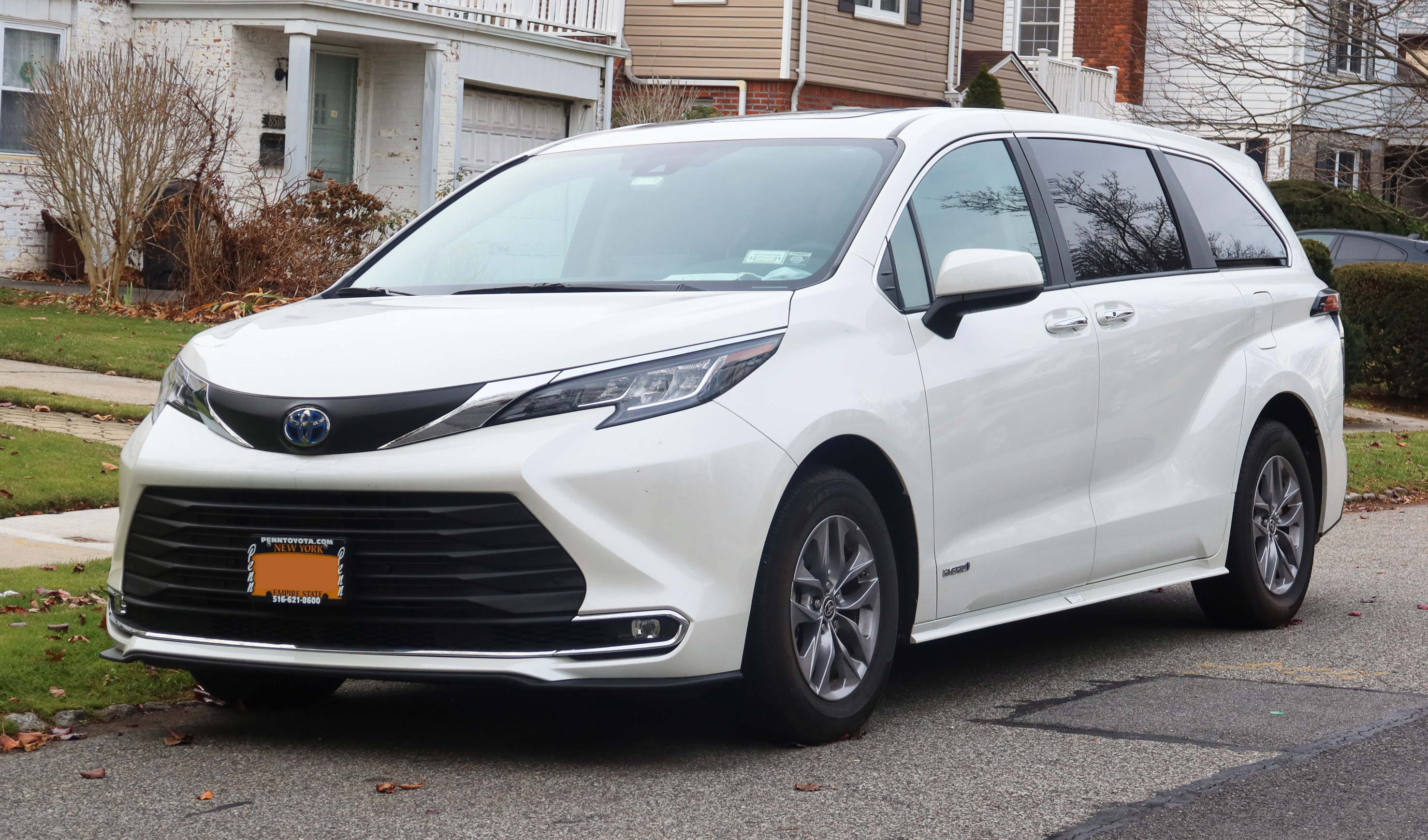
- 2021 Toyota Sienna XLE (AXLH40)

Overview
- Manufacturer: Toyota
- Also called: Toyota Granvia (China, 2022–present)
- Production: August 1997 – present
- Model years: 1998–present

Body and chassis
- Class: Minivan
- Body style: 5-door minivan

Chronology
- Predecessor: Toyota Previa (XR10) (North America); Toyota Previa (XR50) (Taiwan)

The Toyota Sienna is a minivan manufactured and marketed by Toyota primarily for the North American market. It is named for the Italian city of Siena, in the region of Tuscany. It replaced the first generation Previa van, and the Toyota Camry wagon in 1997 (for the 1998 model year) with a more conventional front-wheel drive layout and shares a heavily revised platform with the Camry. Both the Previa and original Sienna were smaller than the other minivans they competed against, but a redesign in 2003 (for the 2004 model year) increased the dimensions to match those of its competitors.

It was redesigned again in 2010 (for the 2011 model year). The third generation Sienna went on sale in the United States in February 2010 and is the first Sienna to ever receive a "Top Safety Pick" award from the Insurance Institute for Highway Safety. A 2020 redesign (for the 2021 model year) saw the Sienna becoming a hybrid vehicle for its fourth generation. While previous generations of the Sienna were exported to select Asian and European markets, the fourth generation is the first to be produced outside of the United States as Chinese production commenced in July 2021 by two Toyota joint ventures. In China, it is also marketed as the Toyota Granvia.

Following the discontinuation of General Motors' all-wheel drive minivans in 2006, the Sienna was the only minivan in its class offered with AWD in North America until the 2021 Chrysler Pacifica was introduced with an AWD option in 2020.

The Sienna is not made in right-hand drive configuration and is not sold in right-hand drive markets. The market segment in many of these markets is occupied by the Alphard/Vellfire and the HiAce/Granvia.

As of the fourth generation, introduced in 2020, the Sienna is built on Toyota's TNGA-K platform, which it shares with most of Toyota's other large MPVs and crossovers.

== First generation (XL10; 1997) ==
First generation
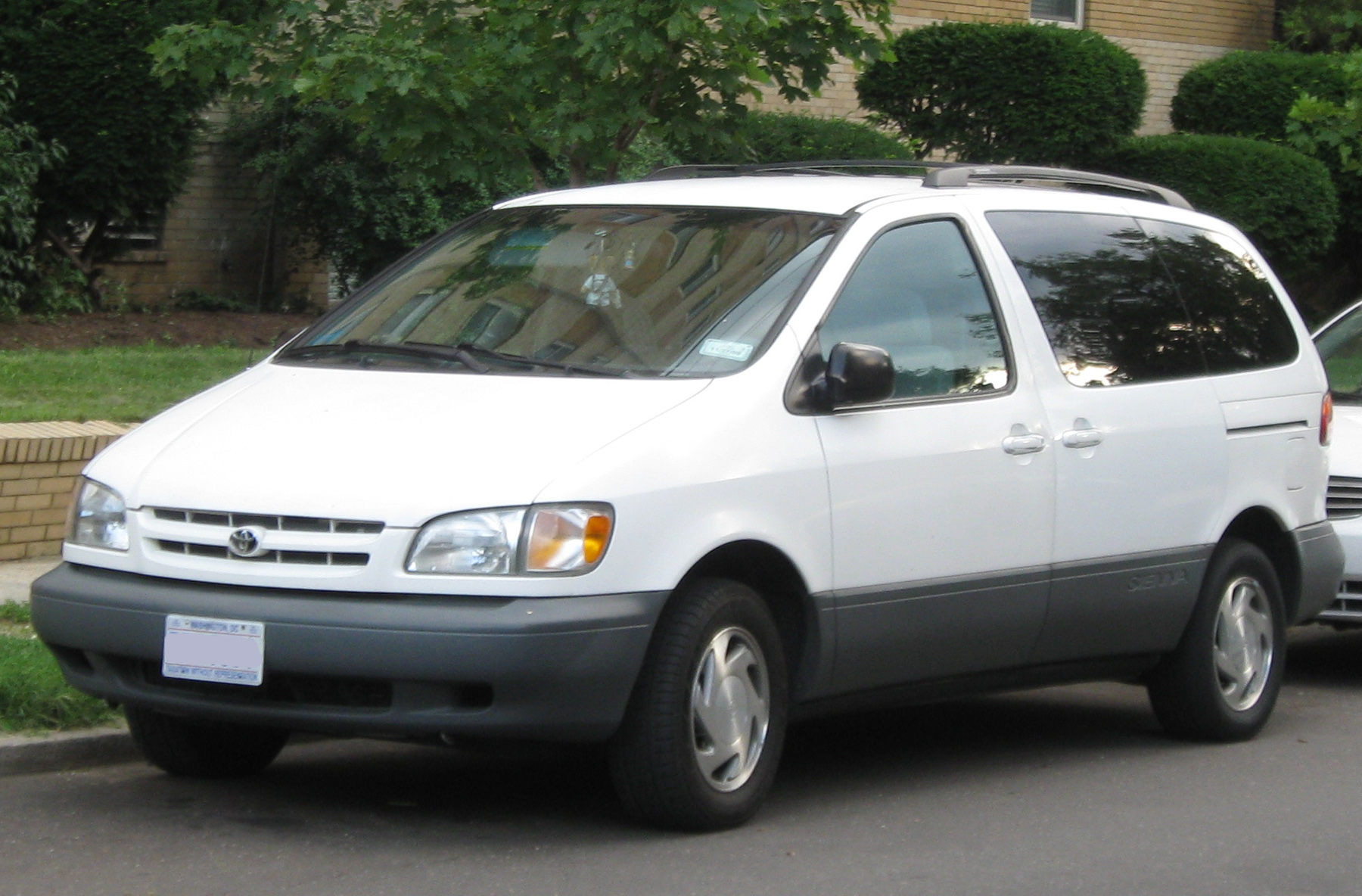

Overview
- Model code: XL10
- Production: August 1997 – December 2002
- Model years: 1998–2003
- Assembly: United States: Georgetown, Kentucky (TMMK)
- Designer: Hosoda Ikuei, Yamaji Shinichi, Mitsunori Miyazaki, Hiroaki Shibata and Hiroaki Suzuki (1994)

Body and chassis
- Layout: Front-engine, front-wheel-drive
- Related: Toyota Avalon (XX10); Toyota Camry (XV20); Lexus ES/Toyota Windom (XV20)

Powertrain
- Engine: Gasoline: 3.0 L 1MZ-FE V6
- Power output: 194–210 hp (145–157 kW; 197–213 PS)
- Transmission: 4-speed A540E/A541E automatic

Dimensions
- Wheelbase: 2,900 mm (114.2 in)
- Length: 4,840 mm (190.5 in) (1998–2000); 4,930 mm (194.2 in) (2001–2003)
- Width: 1,860 mm (73.4 in)
- Height: 1,710 mm (67.3 in)
- Curb weight: 1,802 kg (3,973 lb)

In 1997, Toyota launched the front-wheel drive 1998 model year Sienna in the North American market as a replacement for the mid-engined, rear-wheel-drive Previa. The Sienna debuted with a 3.0-liter 1MZ-FE V6 engine rated at 194 hp (145 kW) and 209 lb⋅ft (284 N⋅m) of torque. Built on an extended platform of the XV20 Toyota Camry, the Sienna was appropriately marketed as the "Camry of minivans," capitalizing on the Camry's popularity and reputation.

It came in three trim levels: CE, LE, and XLE. The LE and XLE models were equipped with second row captain's chairs while the CE models came equipped with a two-passenger bench seat in the second row. The seats may be folded and individually removed as needed. The driver side sliding door and roof rack were standard on the XLE models but were optional on the LE and CE models. The XLE models offered leather seats and a wood trim package. The Sienna also touted best-in-class fuel economy of 16 mpg_{‑US} (15 L/100 km; 19 mpg_{‑imp}) city driving and 22 mpg_{‑US} (11 L/100 km; 26 mpg_{‑imp}) highway driving. It was built in Georgetown, Kentucky. A year after its release, the Sienna faced new competition from the redesigned and V6-equipped Honda Odyssey minivan, which was larger than the Sienna.

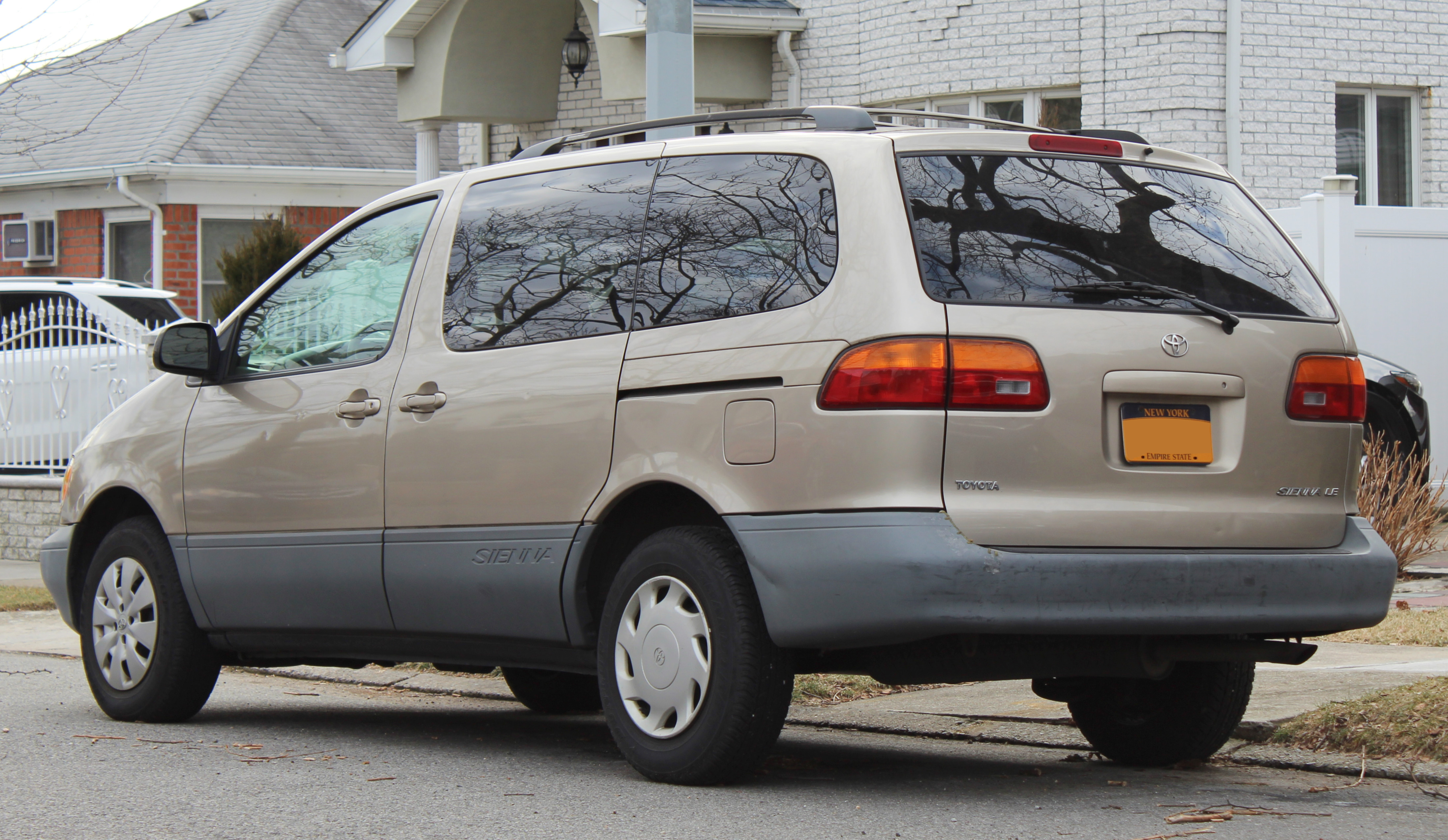
Toyota Sienna LE (pre-facelift)

=== Safety ===
This generation was noteworthy for its impressive safety content as one of the few minivans at the time to offer options including front seat-mounted side torso airbags and Vehicle Stability Control. Anti-lock braking was standard. The Insurance Institute for Highway Safety rated the Sienna "Good" in all six frontal crash test measures, which was far better than the Previa.

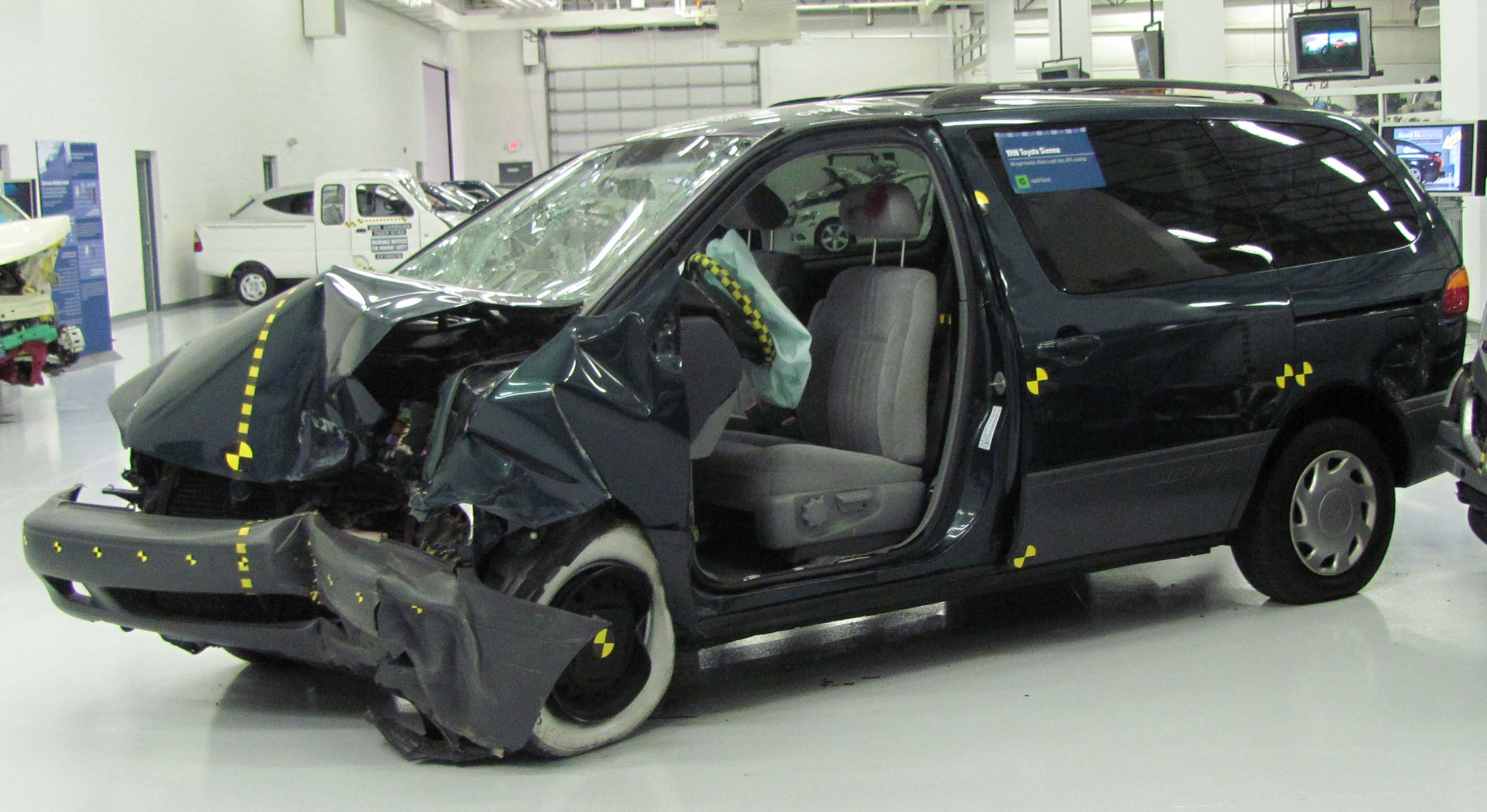
The 1998 Sienna crash-tested by the Insurance Institute for Highway Safety

NHTSA crash test ratings (1999, no side airbag):
Frontal Driver:	5/5 stars
Frontal Passenger:	5/5 stars
Side Driver:	4/5 stars
Side Rear Passenger:	5/5 stars

=== Yearly changes ===
The Sienna underwent a facelift in 2000 for the 2001 model year. Several colors were added and removed. The front grille, bumper, and tail lights were redesigned, and the speedometer got a new look. Toyota also revamped the center console area to add more usability to the HVAC controls along with new locations for the accessory switches (rear vent, power sliding doors, and heated seats (XLE models)). The engine also came equipped with a variable valve timing feature VVT-i boosting output to 210 hp (157 kW) and 220 lb⋅ft (298 N⋅m). The driver side sliding door became standard on all models, although the roof rack remained optional on the CE models.

In 2001, for the 2002 model year, the Symphony Package became available for the LE models, where some extra items included a premium JBL cassette, captain chairs in the front and middle rows, heated mirrors, and so on. It was offered with the choice of three body colors.

In 2002, for the 2003 model year, the Sienna remained unchanged.

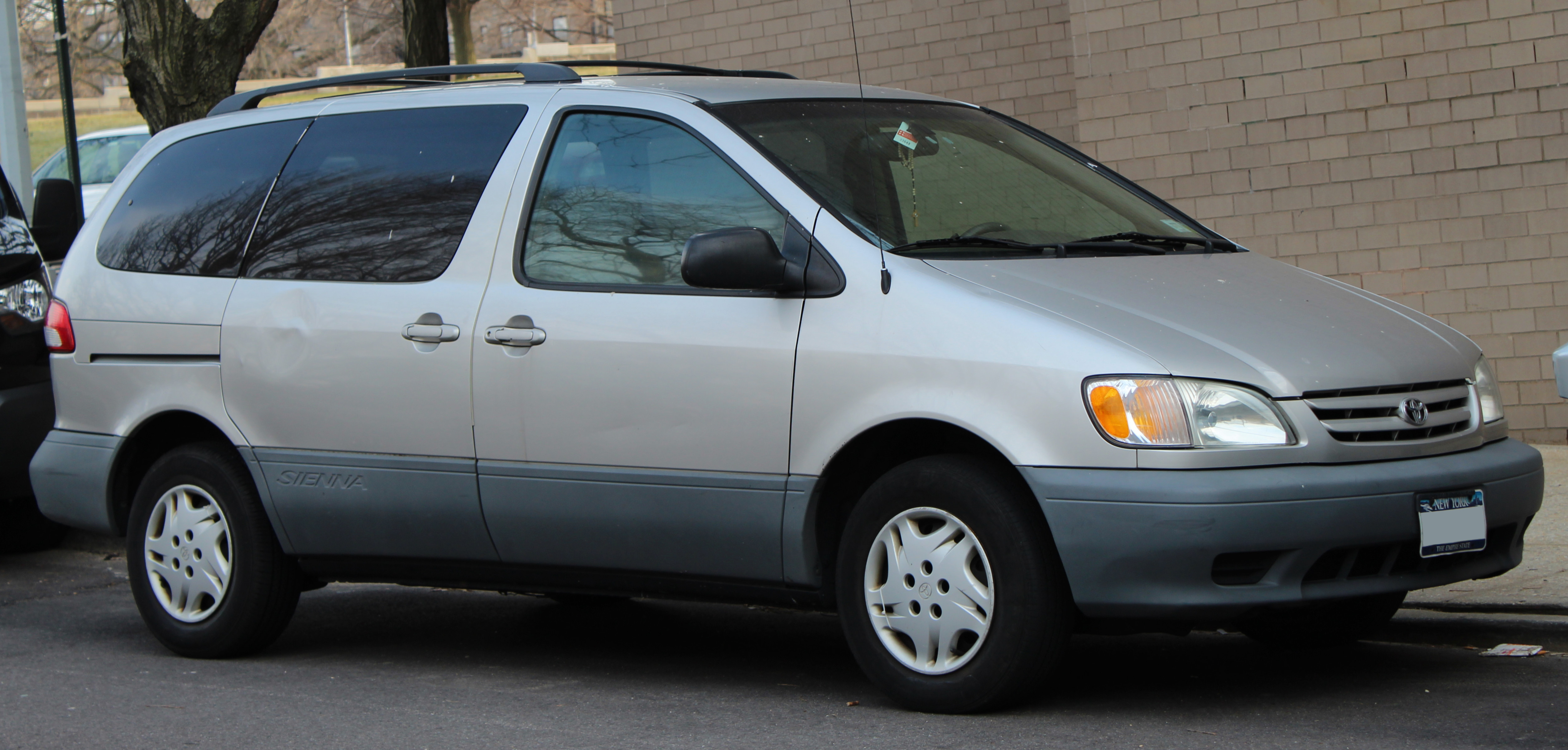
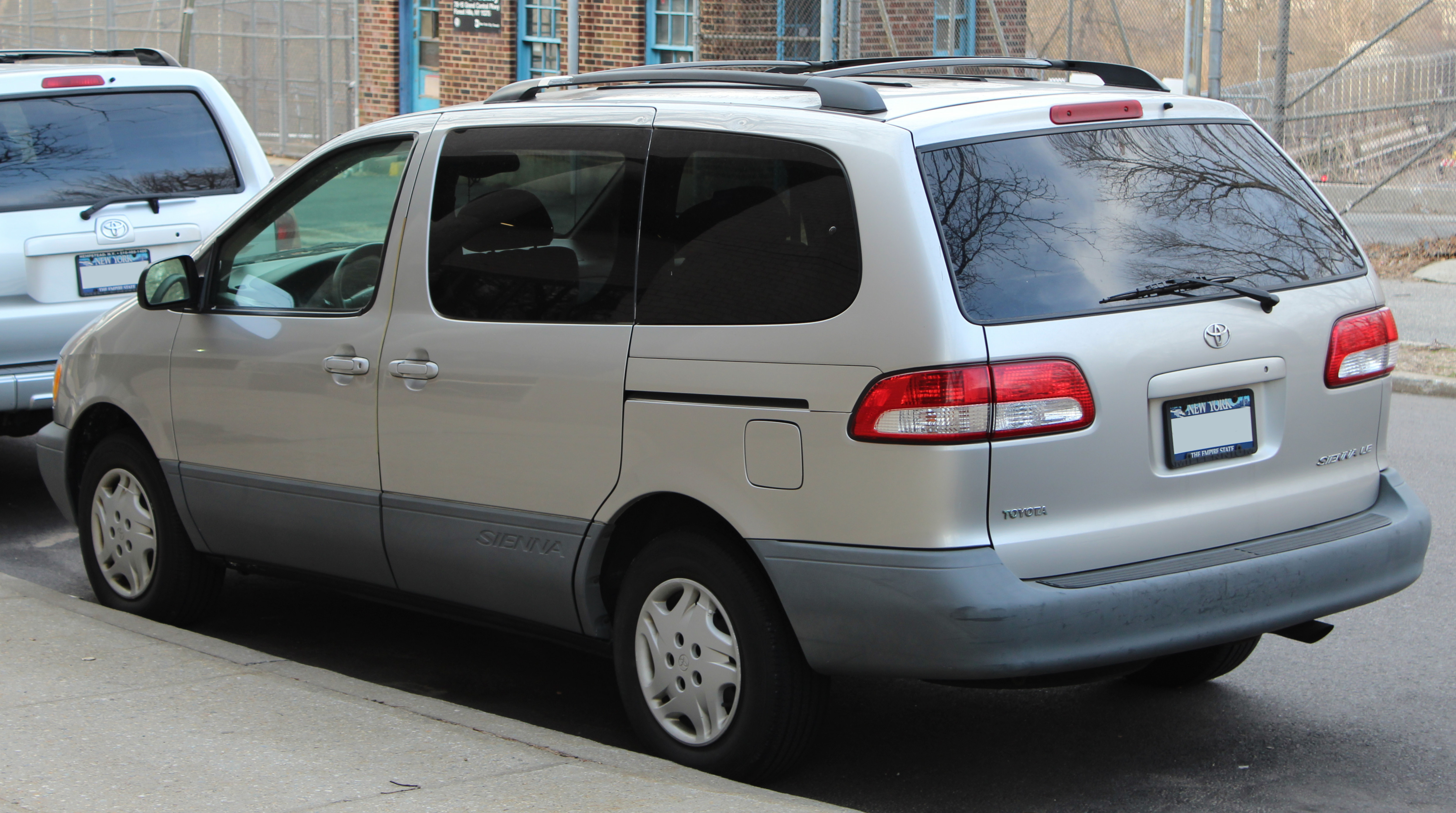
Toyota Sienna LE (facelift)

=== Oil sludge problems ===
The first-generation Sienna was marred by a class-action settlement for an engine oil sludge problem which affected the V6 engines in many Toyota models. Symptoms of the problem include oil smoke in the exhaust, oil quickly becoming dark or black after an oil change, gasoline odor in the oil, high oil consumption, and eventually engine failure.

== Second generation (XL20; 2003) ==
Second generation
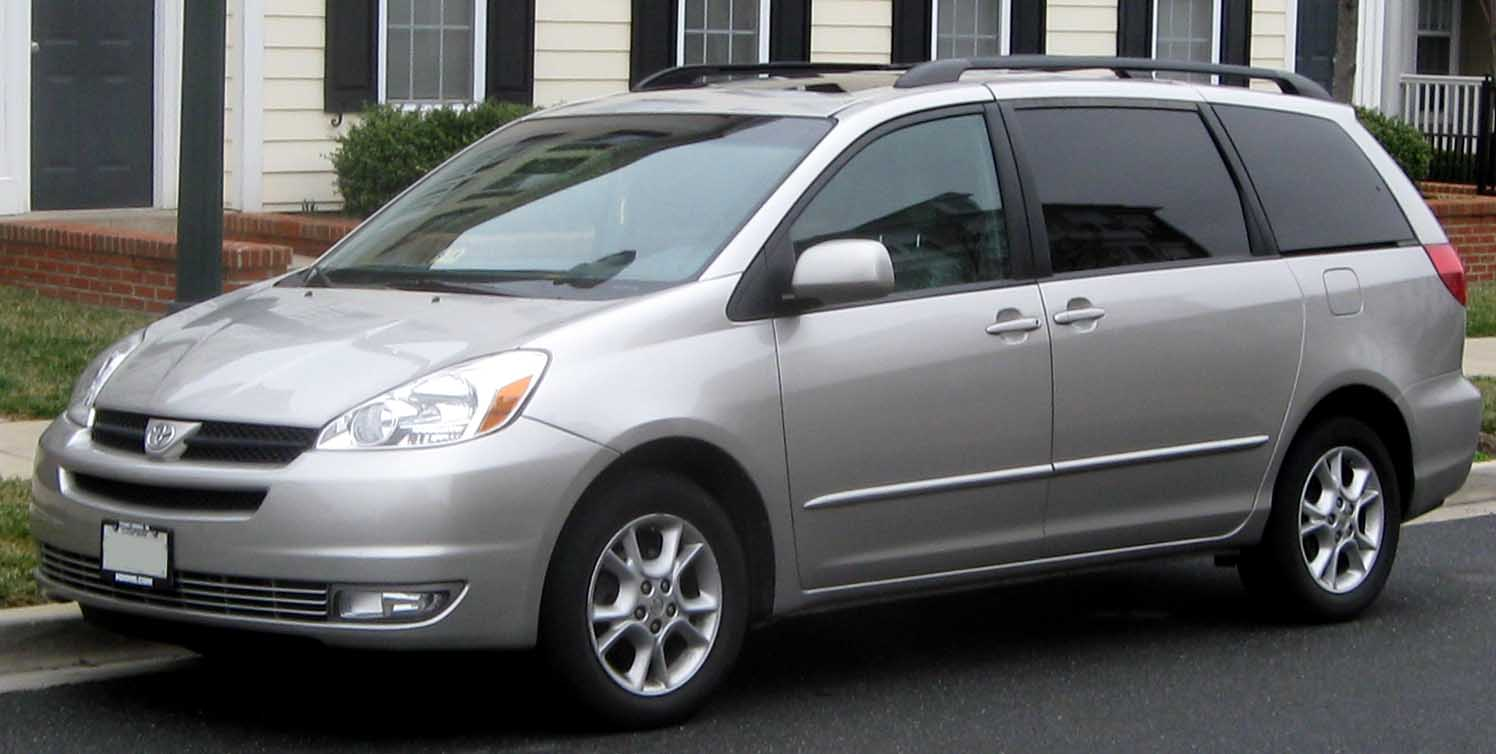
- Toyota Sienna (pre-facelift)

Overview
- Model code: XL20
- Production: January 2003 – December 2009
- Model years: 2004–2010
- Assembly: United States: Princeton, Indiana (TMMI)
- Designer: Kevin Hunter (2000)

Body and chassis
- Layout: Front-engine, front-wheel-drive; Front-engine, all-wheel-drive
- Platform: Toyota K platform
- Related: Toyota Alphard (AH10); Toyota Highlander/Kluger (XU20); Toyota Previa (XR30, XR40)

Powertrain
- Engine: Gasoline: 3.3 L 3MZ-FE V6 (MY2004–2006); 3.5 L 2GR-FE V6 (MY2007–2010)
- Power output: 230 hp (172 kW; 233 PS) (3MZ-FE); 266 hp (198 kW; 270 PS) (2GR-FE)
- Transmission: 5-speed U151E automatic (FWD); 5-speed U151F automatic (AWD)

Dimensions
- Wheelbase: 3,030 mm (119.3 in)
- Length: 5,080 mm (200 in) (2004–2005); 5,105 mm (201 in) (2006–2010)
- Width: 1,970 mm (77.4 in)
- Height: 1,750 mm (68.9 in)
- Curb weight: 2,000 kg (4,400 lb) (FWD); 2,053 kg (4,525 lb) (AWD)

On January 6, 2003, the second-generation Sienna was unveiled at the North American International Auto Show in Detroit. Production was moved from the Georgetown plant to Toyota Motor Manufacturing Indiana.

Toyota assigned Yuji Yokoya as chief engineer on the new Sienna project. Yokoya and his family drove the previous model over 53,000 miles (85,000 km) throughout North America to find weaknesses from the design.

Changes from the first generation included 45% more volume overall and 39% more cargo space. The seats were in the 60/40 split configuration, and the flat-folding third row seat was offered even with all-wheel-drive. The engine was an updated ULEV certified 3.3-liter 3MZ-FE V6 paired with a new five-speed automatic transmission. The gear stick was moved from the steering column to the center console and had a gated shift pattern. Seating for eight was optional on lower-level trims, and the third row seating was fold-flat, allowing the van to transport 4 by 8 feet (1.2 by 2.4 m) building materials like plywood and drywall sheets.

Trim levels, in order of increasing standard and available features were: CE, LE, XLE and XLE Limited (renamed Limited in later years). The most distinguishable difference on the XLE Limited model was the horizontal chrome bar placed above the rear license plate. The CE had a black trim there, while the LE and XLE had a body-colored trim.

Standard features included remote keyless entry, tilt-and-telescopic steering wheel, and high solar energy-absorbing glass (HSEA) on the windshield and front windows. All 2004–2007 Siennas had a factory tow package (hitch kit and trailer lighting connections not included) and a 3,500 pounds (1,600 kg) towing capacity.

All-wheel drive, optional on the more expensive trims included run-flat tires. The all-wheel drive system continuously divided engine power 50:50 front and rear.

Options, depending on the trim level, included HID Xenon headlamps, Dynamic Laser Cruise Control, parking sensors, a convex rear view mirror to enable the driver to see the passengers, a voice-activated navigation system (not voice activated for the 2004/2005 model year) which included a backup camera, 10-speaker JBL audio and rear-seat DVD entertainment system with two 110 V outlets.

Updated styling allowed for a drag coefficient of Cd=0.30. EPA Fuel economy was 17 mpg city driving and 23 mpg highway for the FWD version. The AWD version got 16 mpg city driving and 22 mpg highway driving. The turning radius was 11.2 metres (37 ft).

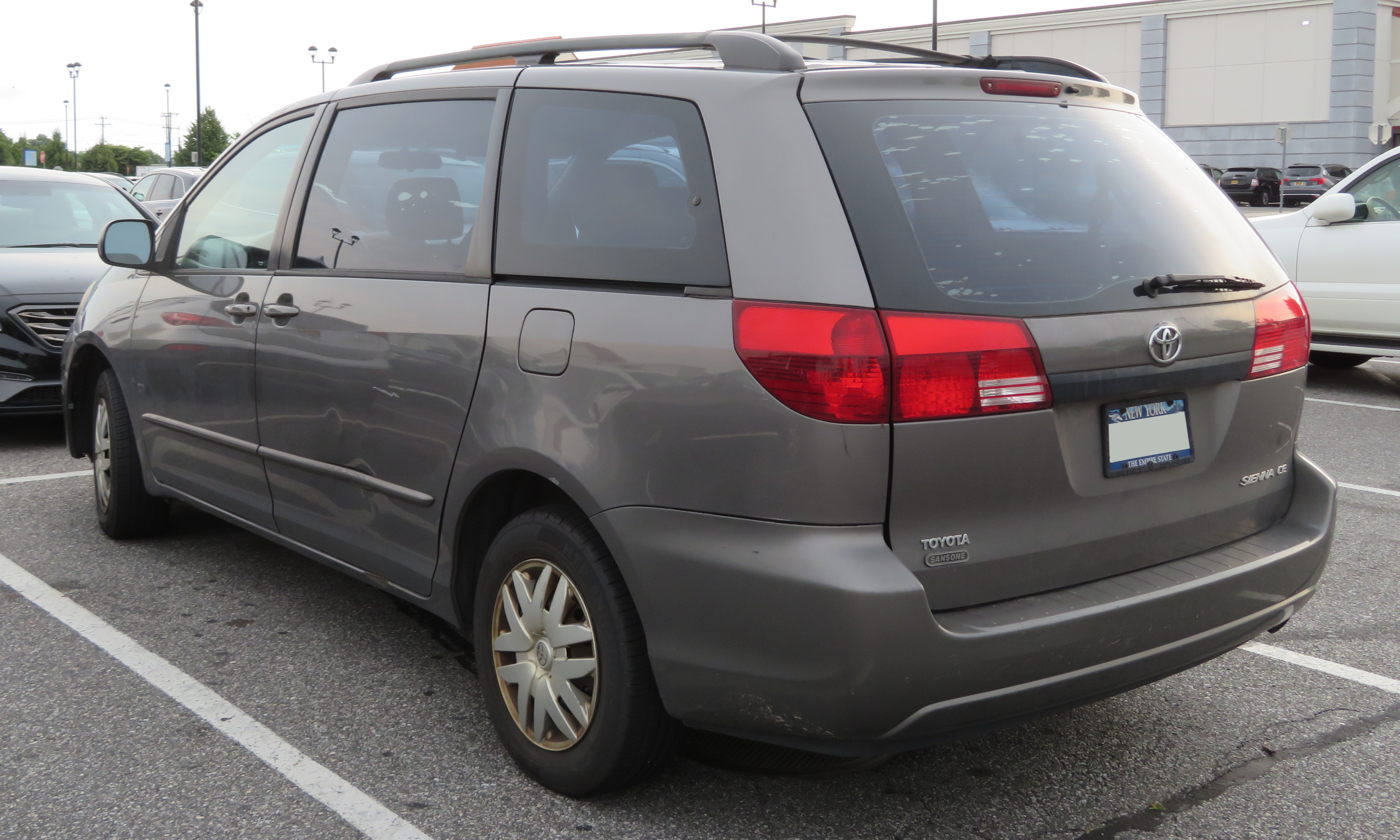
Toyota Sienna CE (pre-facelift)

=== Safety ===
The Sienna came standard with anti-lock braking system, brake assist, electronic brakeforce distribution, traction control and a tire-pressure monitoring system. Side torso airbags and side curtain airbags were standard on certain 2004 and 2005 LE and XLE trims while optional on others, but became standard on all 2006 trims. Vehicle Stability Control initially optional on lower trims became standard for 2008 models.

The IIHS gives the Sienna an overall "Good" score in their frontal offset crash test with "Good" marks in all six measured categories. All 2006 models and later receive a "Good" overall score, while pre-2006 models without side airbags receive an "Acceptable" score for side impacts.

NHTSA crash test ratings (2004, no side airbag):
Frontal Driver:	5/5 stars
Frontal Passenger:	5/5 stars
Side Driver:	5/5 stars
Side Rear Passenger:	5/5 stars
FWD Rollover:	4/5 stars

NHTSA crash test ratings (2005, no side airbag):
Frontal Driver:	4/5 stars
Frontal Passenger:	5/5 stars
Side Driver:	5/5 stars
Side Rear Passenger:	5/5 stars
FWD Rollover:	4/5 stars

=== Yearly changes ===
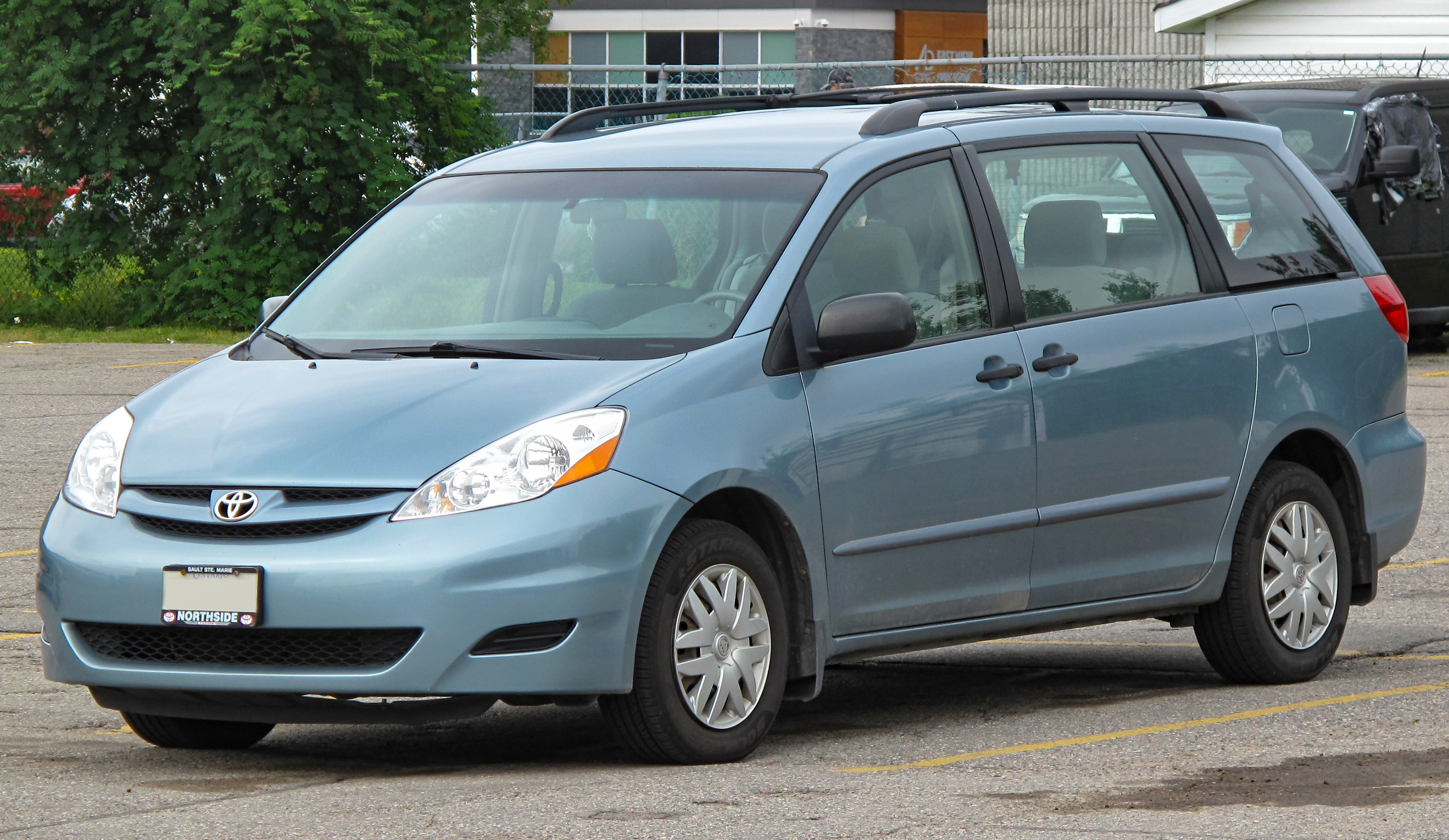
Toyota Sienna CE (facelift)

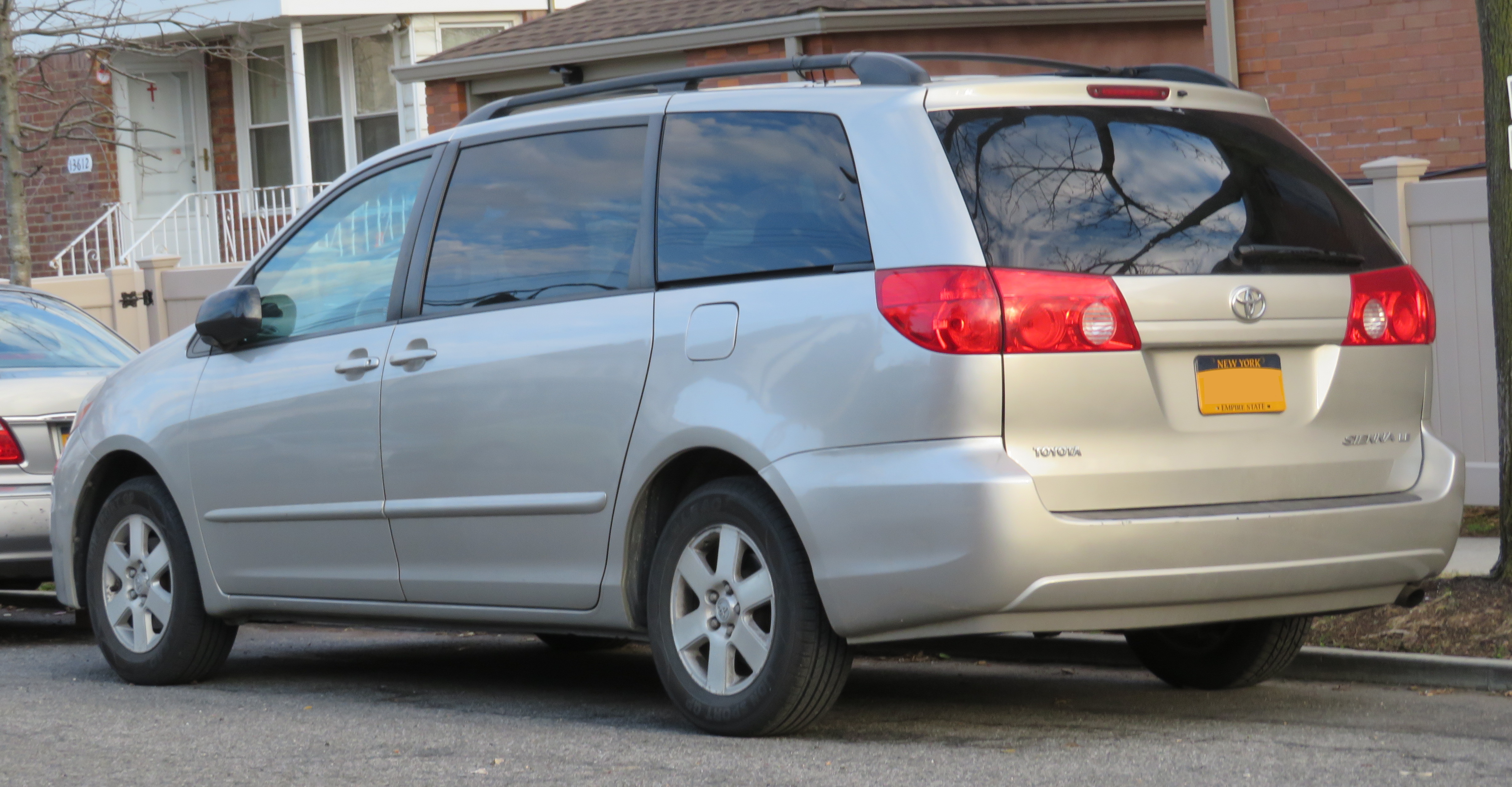
Toyota Sienna LE (facelift)

- 2006: the front fascia, side molding, headlamps and tail lights were restyled. Blue-backlit electroluminescent Optitron gauges were added to LE, XLE, and Limited trims. The "XLE" prefix in "XLE Limited" was removed, and new exclusive equipment for this trim included an optional memory function for the driver's power seat and side-view mirrors (also available on XLE as an option) and power-folding exterior side-view mirrors with integrated in-glass LED turn-signal repeaters. Other options included Bluetooth and a power-folding third-row seat. Front row side torso airbags and side curtain airbags for all three rows became standard equipment on all models. The optional rear seat audio system was discontinued. Horsepower and torque ratings were changed to meet SAE's new standard to 215 hp (160 kW) and 222 lb·ft (from 230 hp (172 kW) and 242 lb⋅ft (328 N⋅m), Toyota also started to rate engines on 87 octane).
- 2007: a new ULEV-II certified 3.5-liter 2GR-FE V6 engine rated at 266 hp (198 kW) with a rated fuel economy of 17/23 MPG for front-wheel-drive models and 16/21 MPG for AWD models replaced the 3.3-liter V6. This engine had a lower-maintenance timing chain as opposed to the timing belt of previous Sienna engines. The tire pressure monitor was upgraded, and a new seven-spoke alloy wheel design was made exclusive to the Limited and AWD models.
- 2008: Vehicle Stability Control became standard in all trims.
- 2009: the Sienna remained largely unchanged, except for a revision in pricing to become more competitive through several available comprehensively equipped "extra-value package" offerings. In Canada, base prices were lowered by up to $1,500. Rear power window switches were also modified to comply with new regulations against toggle window switches.
- 2010: the second generation Sienna was unchanged in its final model year.

== Third generation (XL30; 2010) ==
Third generation
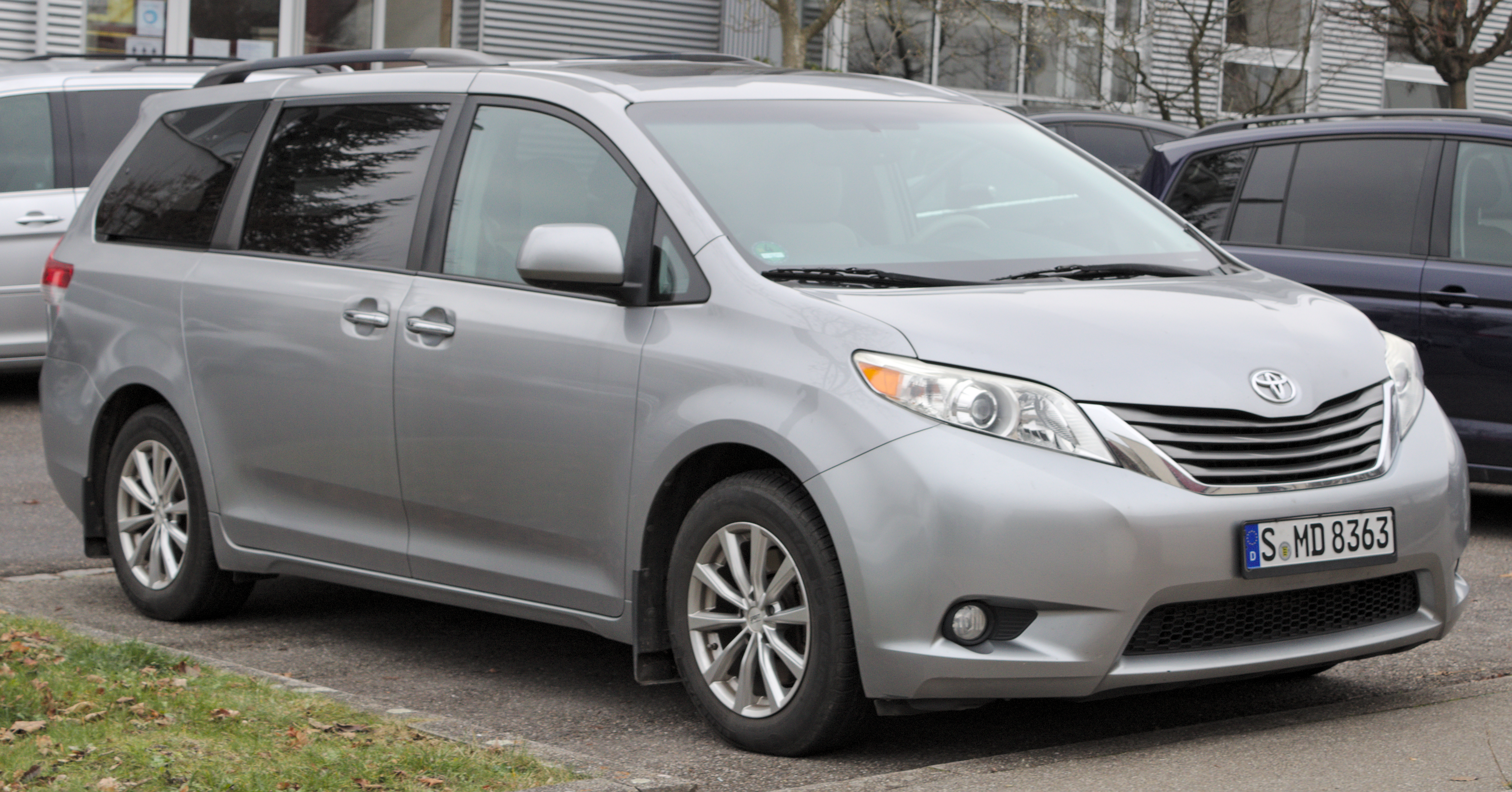
- Toyota Sienna XLE (pre-facelift)

Overview
- Model code: XL30
- Production: January 2010 – August 2020
- Model years: 2011–2020
- Assembly: United States: Princeton, Indiana (TMMI)
- Designer: Ian Cartabiano and Kazuo Mori (2006)

Body and chassis
- Layout: Front-engine, front-wheel-drive; Front-engine, four-wheel-drive
- Platform: Toyota K platform
- Related: Toyota Highlander/Kluger (XU40); Toyota Highlander/Kluger (XU50)

Powertrain
- Engine: Gasoline: 2.7 L 1AR-FE I4 (MY2011–2012); 3.5 L 2GR-FE V6 (MY2011–2016); 3.5 L 2GR-FKS V6 (MY2017–2020)
- Power output: 187 hp (139 kW; 190 PS) (1AR-FE); 266 hp (198 kW; 270 PS) (2GR-FE); 296 hp (221 kW; 300 PS) (2GR-FKS)
- Transmission: 6-speed U660E automatic (MY2011–2016); 8-speed UA80E/F (FWD/AWD) automatic (MY2017–2020)

Dimensions
- Wheelbase: 3,030 mm (119.3 in)
- Length: 5,090 mm (200.2 in)
- Width: 1,990 mm (78.2 in)
- Height: 1,750 mm (68.9 in); 1,800 mm (70.7 in) (with roof rails)
- Curb weight: 1,950 kg (4,310 lb)

The redesigned Sienna premiered at the Los Angeles Auto Show in early December 2009 for the 2011 model year. It was designed at Calty studios and engineered at Toyota Technical Center in Ann Arbor, Michigan and Toyota Motor Corporation in Japan. The new Sienna arrived at dealers in February 2010. In November 2011, exports of the XL30 Sienna to South Korea began, making it the first Toyota minivan sold in the country. In July 2016, the Sienna was officially introduced to the Taiwanese market.

In the U.S., the third-generation Sienna was offered in five trim levels, a base grade, LE, XLE, Limited and for the first time the SE trim. The new SE offers revised bodywork, clear tail lamps, 19-inch (480 mm) wheels, firmer suspension and revised steering tuning for a sportier ride. All-wheel-drive is only available with the V6 engine on the LE, XLE and Limited model trims. Described by AOL Autos as slipping a sports car in a minivan, chief engineer Kazuo Mori (an avid autocrosser) reportedly had to overcome corporate opposition to get the SE equipment package included in the line-up.

The previous 3.5-liter 2GR-FE continues, became paired to a 6-speed transmission, but for the first time the Sienna offers a four-cylinder engine, the 1AR-FE. This is the first time Toyota has offered a four-cylinder engine in a North American minivan since discontinuation of the Estima/Previa in late 1997. An electric power steering (EPS) system replaces the previous hydraulic power steering system. Toyota continued to offer all-wheel drive in the Sienna. As GM discontinued its AWD minivans after the 2006 model year, it was the only North American minivan with an available AWD drivetrain until the 2021 Chrysler Pacifica went on sale in late 2020. Toyota published EPA-estimated mileage figures of 19 mpg_{‑US} (12.4 L/100 km; 22.8 mpg_{‑imp}) city / 24 mpg_{‑US} (9.8 L/100 km; 28.8 mpg_{‑imp}) highway for models powered by the 4-cylinder engine, 18 mpg_{‑US} (13.1 L/100 km; 21.6 mpg_{‑imp}) city / 24 mpg_{‑US} (9.8 L/100 km; 28.8 mpg_{‑imp}) highway for FWD V6 models, and 16 mpg_{‑US} (14.7 L/100 km; 19.2 mpg_{‑imp}) city / 22 mpg_{‑US} (10.7 L/100 km; 26.4 mpg_{‑imp}) highway for AWD models. An optional tow package for V6 models is rated to tow 3,500 pounds (1,600 kg).

The front dashboard features a "swoop" wood trim, inspired by the Toyota Venza and Lexus RX, that gives front seat occupants a "60/60" split whether in the driver or passenger seat.

New features included an optional sliding second row with "Lounge Seating" recliner style chairs, a feature previously seen on the Lexus LS, and Toyota's keyless Smart Key System with push-button start. The rear seat entertainment option started to use a 16.4-inch (41.7 cm) LCD screen which operates in two view modes, a single 16:9-ratio widescreen or two separate 4:3-ratio split screens with separate wireless headphones.

For safety the back-up camera comes with a new 180° panoramic view. Other new options include a Pre-Collision System (PCS) as well as an automatic highbeam dimmer, Safety Connect and a more advanced stability control system known as Vehicle Integrated Dynamics Management. A driver's knee airbag became standard as well.

When the second row seats are removed, the bottom of the second row seats, which is similar to a rack, remains attached to the van floor. This means that with second row seats removed, the floor is not flat.

Toyota is the first automaker to offer a factory installed auto-access seat for disabled people. The one-touch rotating, power ascending/descending lift-up seat can lower to within 19 inches (48 cm) of the ground.

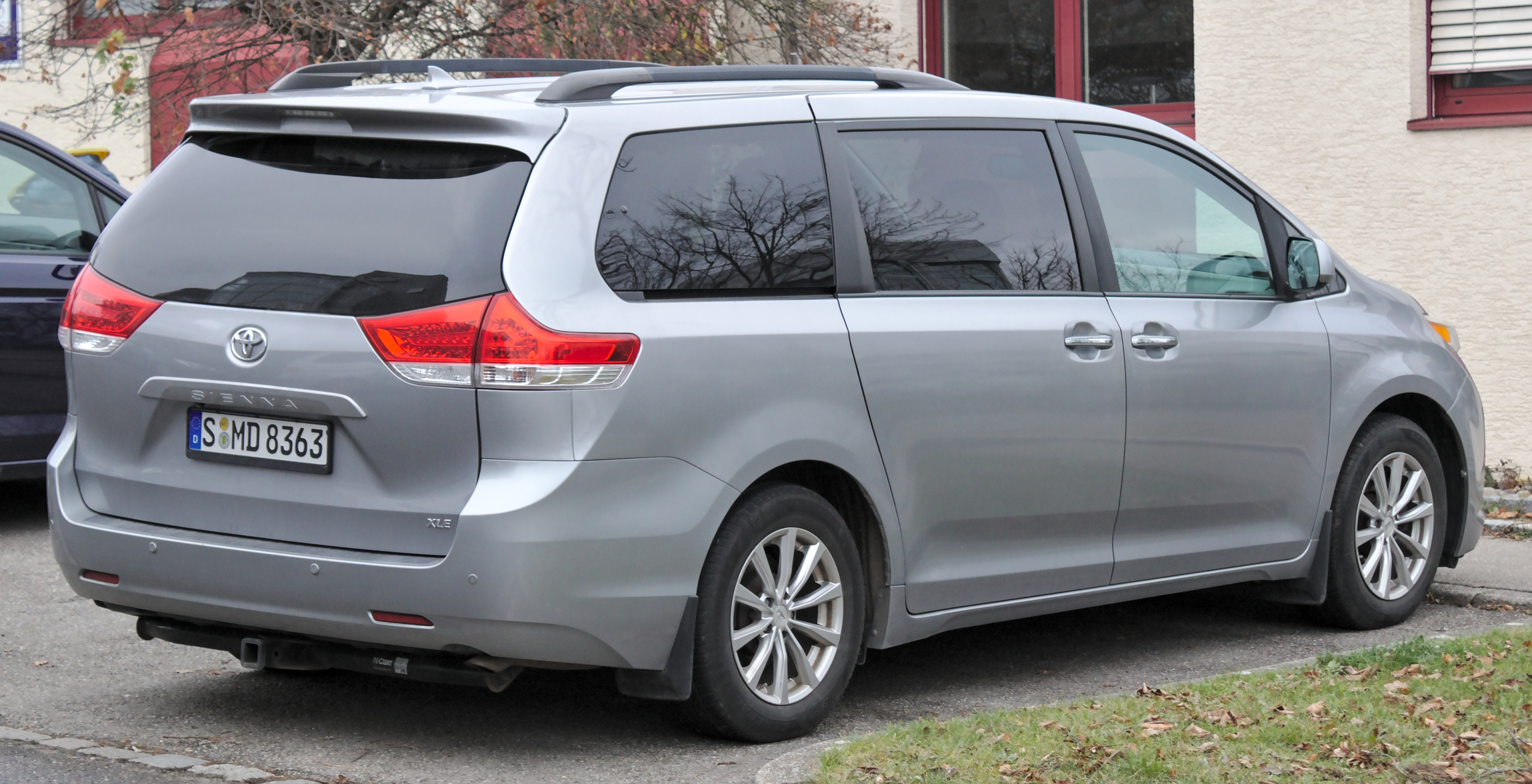
Toyota Sienna XLE (pre-facelift)

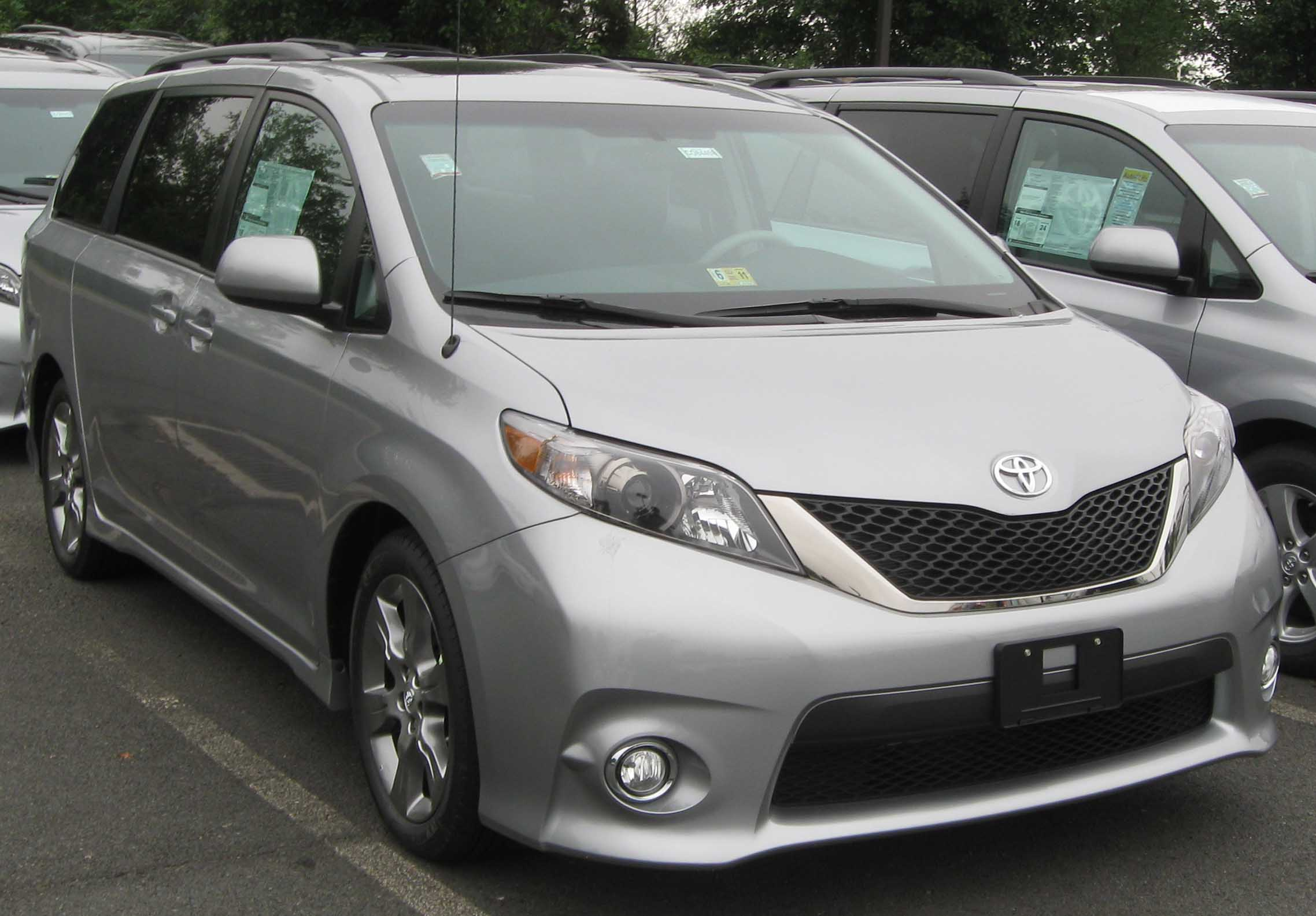
Toyota Sienna SE (pre-facelift)

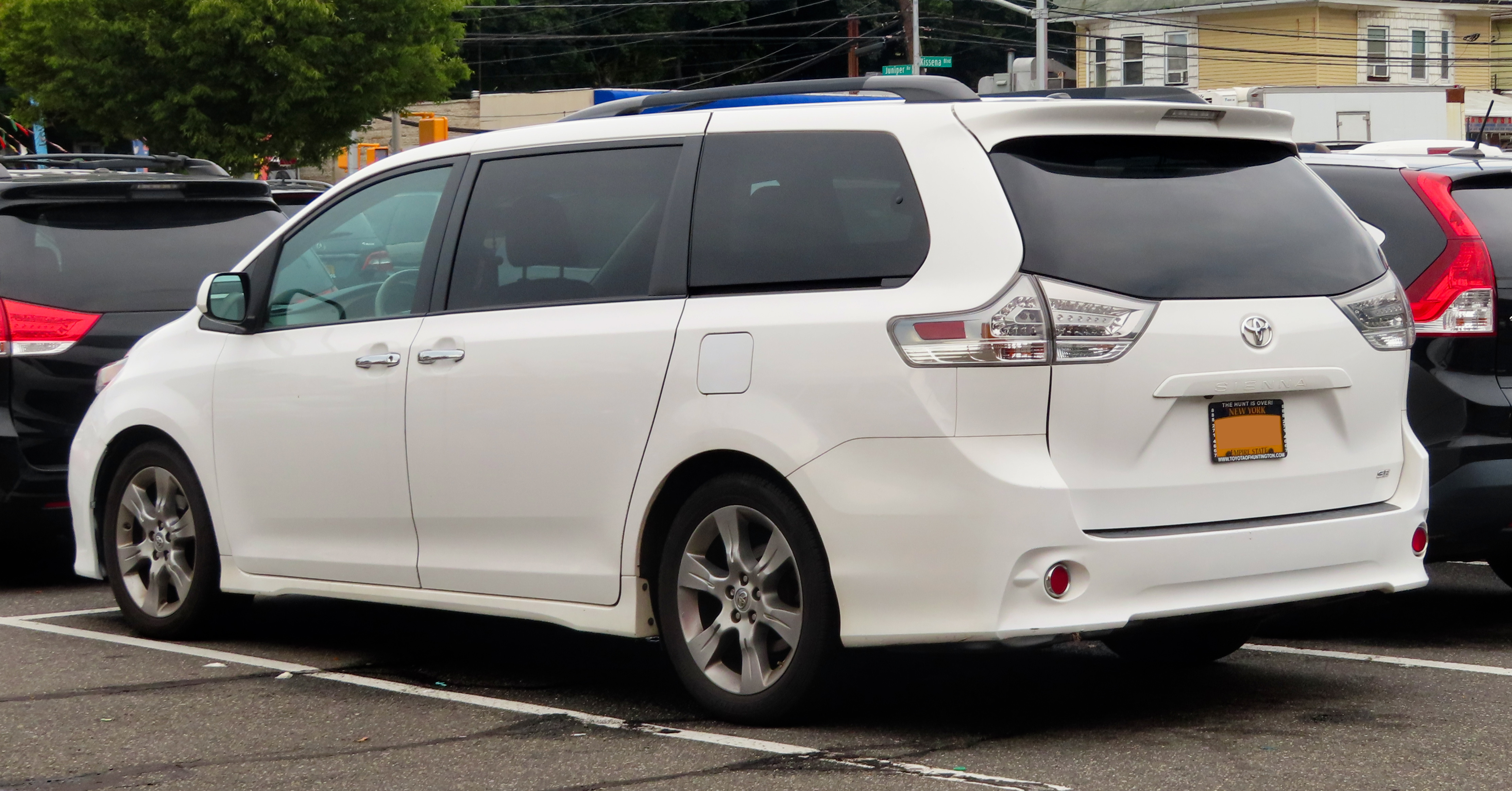
Toyota Sienna SE (pre-facelift)

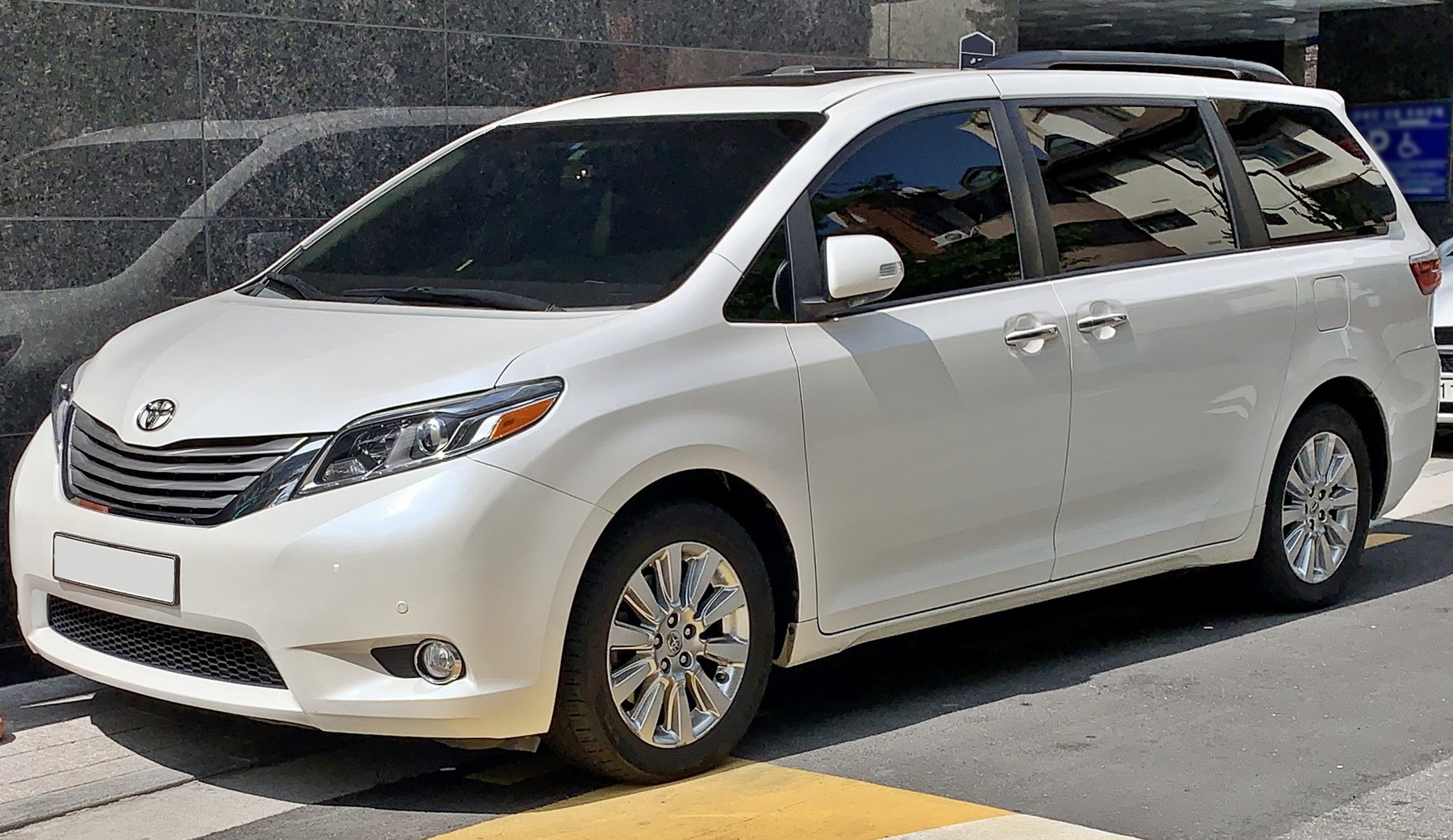
Toyota Sienna Limited (pre-facelift)

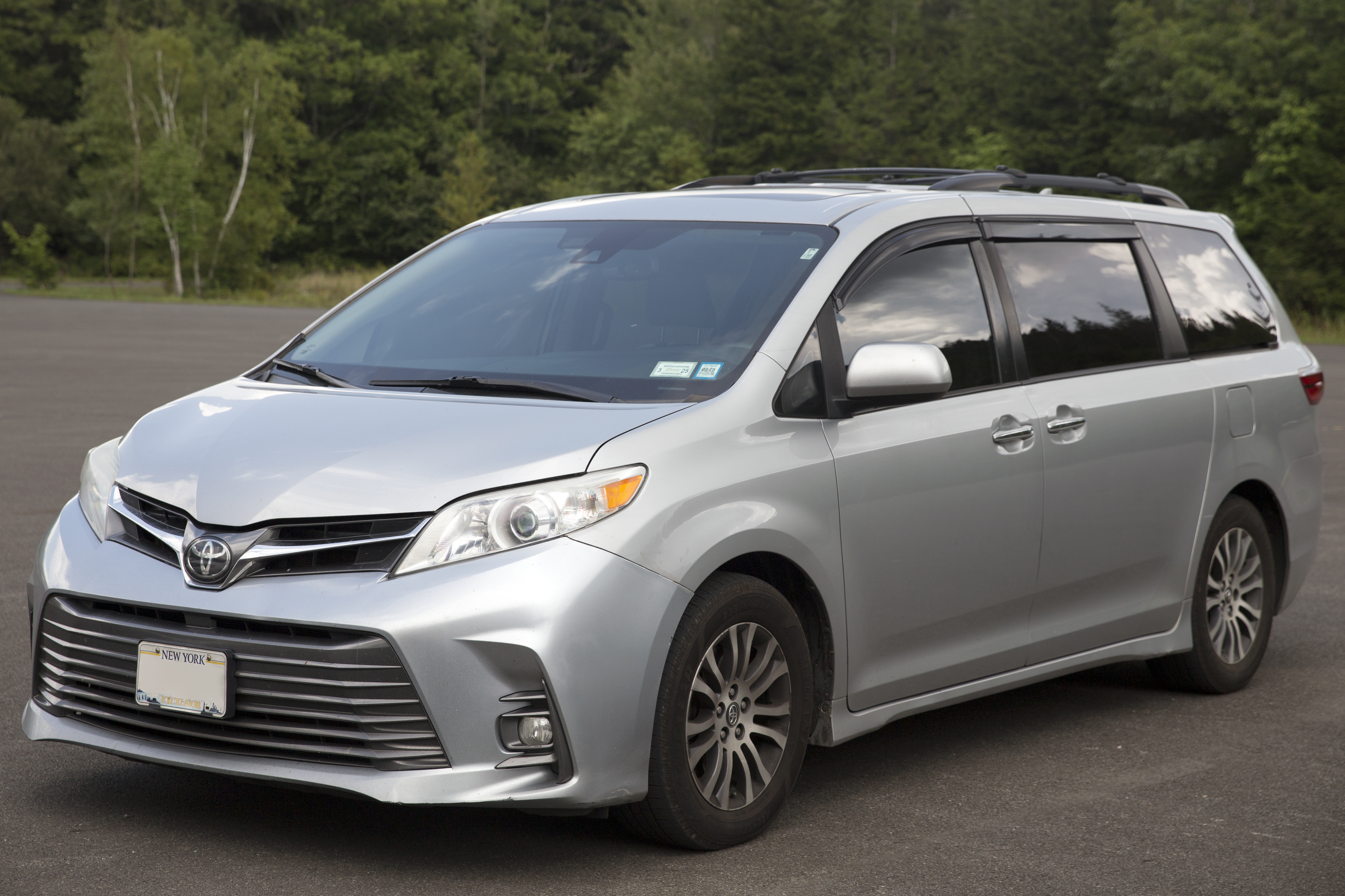
2019 Toyota Sienna XLE (facelift)

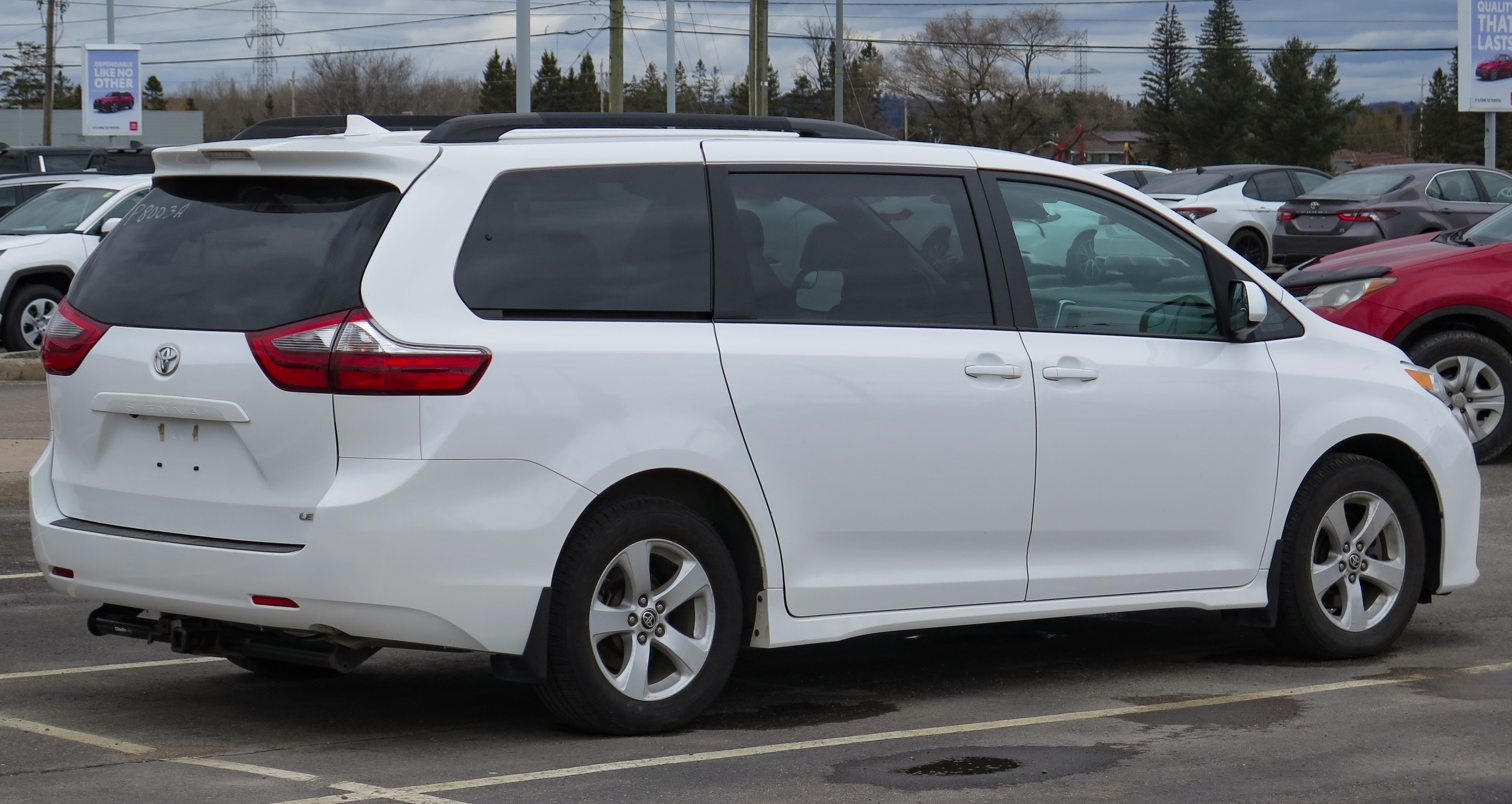
2020 Toyota Sienna LE (facelift)

=== Yearly changes ===
- 2011, for the 2012 model year: Toyota's new navigation system with Entune connected navigation system became available.
- 2012, for the 2013 model year: The four-cylinder engine was dropped.
- 2013, for the 2014 model year: The Sienna remained unchanged.
- 2014, for the 2015 model year: Minor refresh with new tail lights for all trim levels except the SE. In the interior, the dash was redesigned replacing the asymmetric swoop with a more conventional and cohesive center display. The previous small info window on top of the dash was also removed and placed in the center display. The center console was also redesigned. The entertainment system was updated to Blu-Ray with HDMI and SD card auxiliary input, from the earlier DVD with RCA jacks. Several technological upgrades could be optioned. Toyota added three new colors (Sky Blue Pearl, Creme Brulee Metallic, and Attitude Black Metallic). For the Limited and SE models, the Sienna features refreshed headlights with LED daytime running lights.
- 2016, for the 2017 model year: The six-speed automatic transmission was replaced with an eight-speed and a revised 2GR-FKS engine adding Toyota's D4-S direct injection fuel system. The new engine increased power to 296 hp (221 kW), with torque increased to 263 lb⋅ft (357 N⋅m).
- 2017, for the 2018 model year: A mild facelift with a new front grille, new headlights, new side skirts, standard Safety Sense, minor noise and vibration enhancements, and additional technology like extra USB ports, an updated rear entertainment system (for models equipped with this option), and a semi-digital instrument cluster. The new grille is available in 3 styles: On the XLE and Limited, a chrome pair of wings bisects the grille. On the LE, the wing is black. The SE grille has no wing. The 2018 model year has standard automatic emergency braking, adaptive cruise control, lane-departure warning with lane-keeping assist, and automated high-beams.
- 2018, for the 2019 model year: All-wheel drive became available on the SE trim and the Limited trim with FWD is no longer offered. CarPlay support is introduced alongside the Entune 3.0 media system.
- 2019, for the 2020 model year: The Nightshade Edition became available on all FWD and AWD models. The Nightshade package includes four exterior colors: Midnight Black Metallic, Celestial Silver Metallic, Salsa Red Pearl and Super White.

=== Safety ===
IIHS
Driver small overlap frontal offset (2015–2020 models)	Acceptable^{*}
Passenger small overlap frontal offset	Marginal^{**}
Moderate overlap frontal offset	Good
Side impact	Good
Roof strength	Good

^{*}vehicle structure rated 'Marginal'
^{**}vehicle structure rated 'Poor'

== Fourth generation (XL40; 2020) ==
Fourth generation
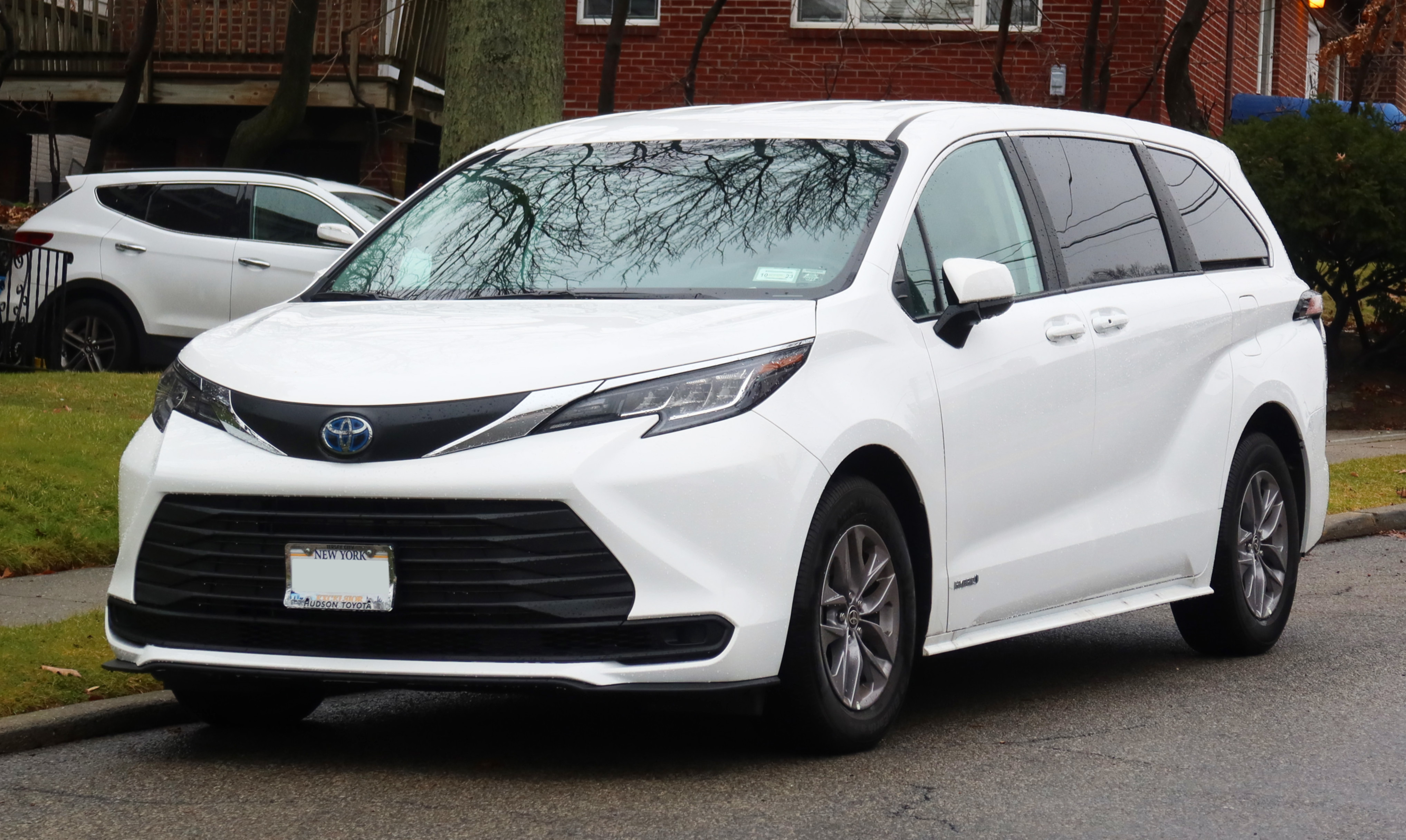
- 2021 Toyota Sienna LE (AXLH40)

Overview
- Model code: XL40
- Also called: Toyota Granvia (China, FAW Toyota)
- Production: September 2020 – present (United States); July 2021 – present (China)
- Model years: 2021–present
- Assembly: United States: Princeton, Indiana (TMMI); China: Guangzhou (GAC Toyota); Tianjin (FAW Toyota)
- Designer: Chao Feng

Body and chassis
- Layout: Front-engine, front-wheel-drive; Front-engine, four-wheel-drive (Electronic-AWD)
- Platform: TNGA: GA-K
- Related: Toyota Alphard/Vellfire/Crown Vellfire (AH40); Toyota Highlander (XU70); Lexus LM (AW10)

Powertrain
- Engine: Gasoline hybrid: 2.5 L A25A-FXS I4; 2.5 L A25D-FXS I4 (China); 2.5 L A25H-FXS I4 (Granvia)
- Electric motor: 2x permanent-magnet synchronous motor (PMSM)
- Power output: 186 hp (139 kW; 189 PS) (gasoline engine only); 243 hp (181 kW; 246 PS) (combined system output)
- Transmission: eCVT
- Hybrid drivetrain: Power-split (Hybrid Synergy Drive)
- Battery: 1.9 kWh (HEV)
- Plug-in charging: V2L: 1.5 kW (HEV)

Dimensions
- Wheelbase: 3,060 mm (120.5 in)
- Length: 5,170–5,180 mm (203.7–204.1 in)
- Width: 1,990 mm (78.5 in)
- Height: 1,740–1,780 mm (68.5–70 in)
- Curb weight: 2,090–2,146 kg (4,608–4,731 lb)

Toyota announced the fourth-generation Sienna in May 2020 as a 2021 model, and appearing for sale near the end of 2020. It was originally intended to be revealed at the 2020 New York International Auto Show in April, but instead was unveiled virtually on May 18, 2020 due to the COVID-19 pandemic. It was released on October 27, 2020 and hit the showrooms shortly after in November. It is built on GA-K platform. In a significant change, all trims of the Sienna came standard with a hybrid powertrain. The fourth-generation Sienna has the same 1,600 kg (3,500 lb) towing capacity as the third-generation model. The Sienna optionally has all-wheel drive with a third electric motor to power the rear wheels.

The fourth-generation Sienna is offered in the returning LE, XLE and Limited trims, while receiving two additional trims: the sport-oriented XSE (replaced the SE trim), and the top-of-the-line Platinum trim. The Sienna is available with a built-in vacuum cleaner, refrigerated compartment, heads-up display, and 360° camera view on the Platinum trim level. Standard and optional family oriented features for the Sienna include 18 cup holders, 7 USB ports (only one of which is data capable), four-zone climate control, onboard Wi-Fi, rear entertainment system, power sliding doors and liftgate, and a voice amplification system for the driver for better communications with passengers seated in the back. Standard driver-assistance features include adaptive cruise control, blind-spot monitoring, automated emergency braking, and lane-keeping assist.

Starting in early 2021, the Sienna became available in Taiwan and in Mexico. In July 2021, the Sienna was launched in China where it is locally produced by GAC Toyota, while a rebadged variant bearing the Toyota Granvia (Chinese: 格瑞维亚; pinyin: Géruìwéiyǎ) nameplate was produced by FAW Toyota. The Granvia adopted the styling of the North American Sienna XSE.

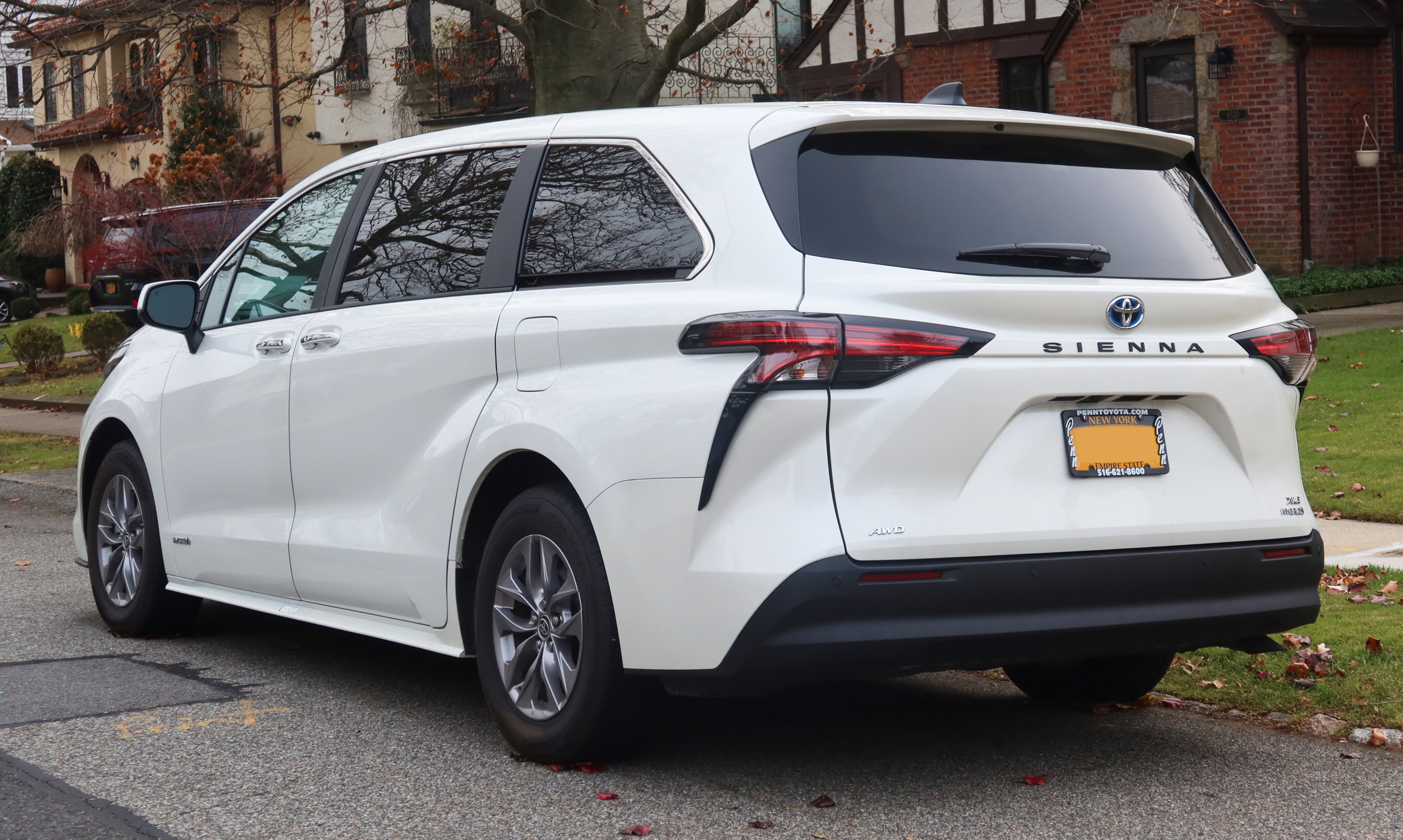
2021 Toyota Sienna XLE (AXLH40)

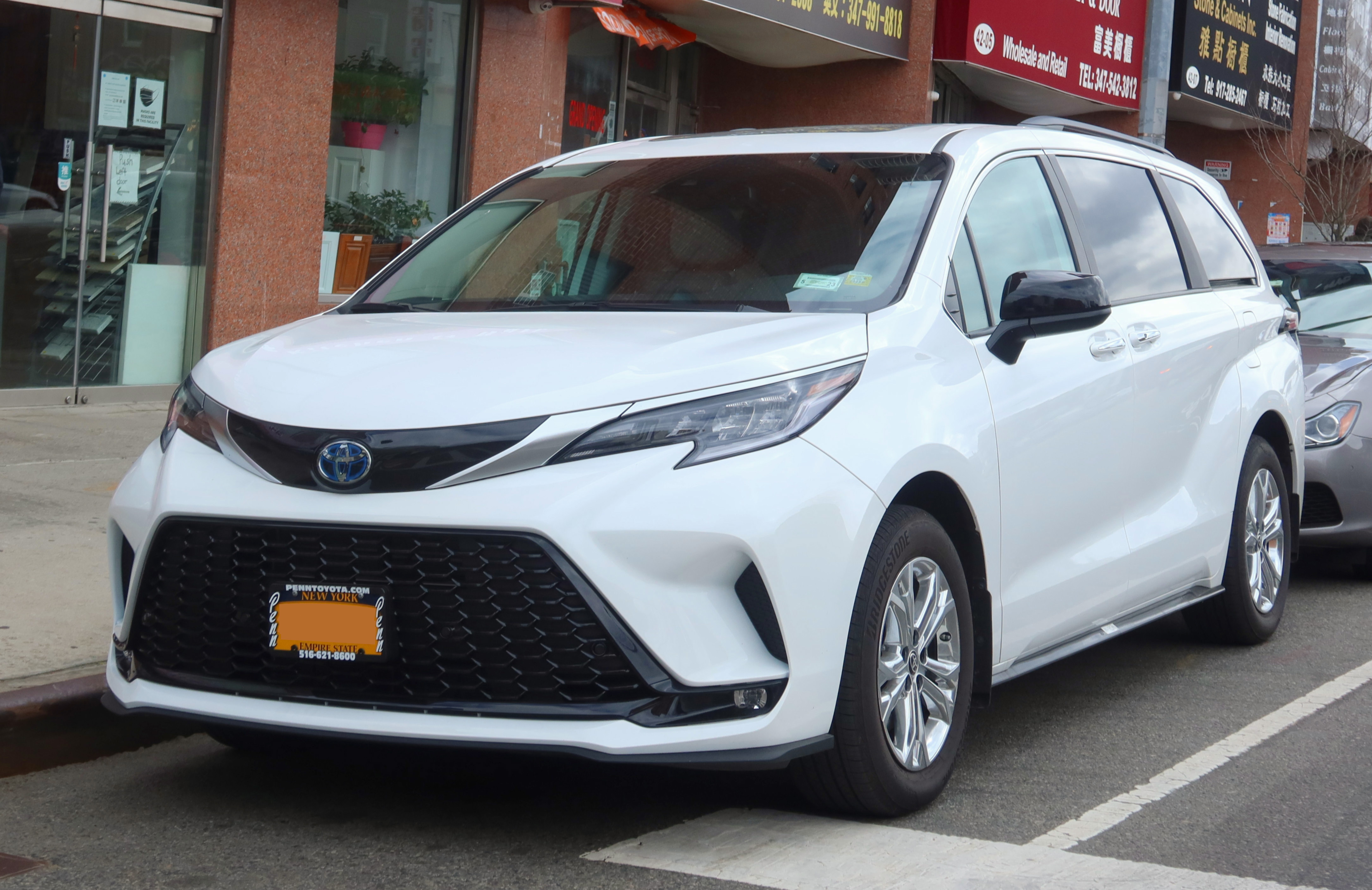
2022 Toyota Sienna XSE (AXLH40)

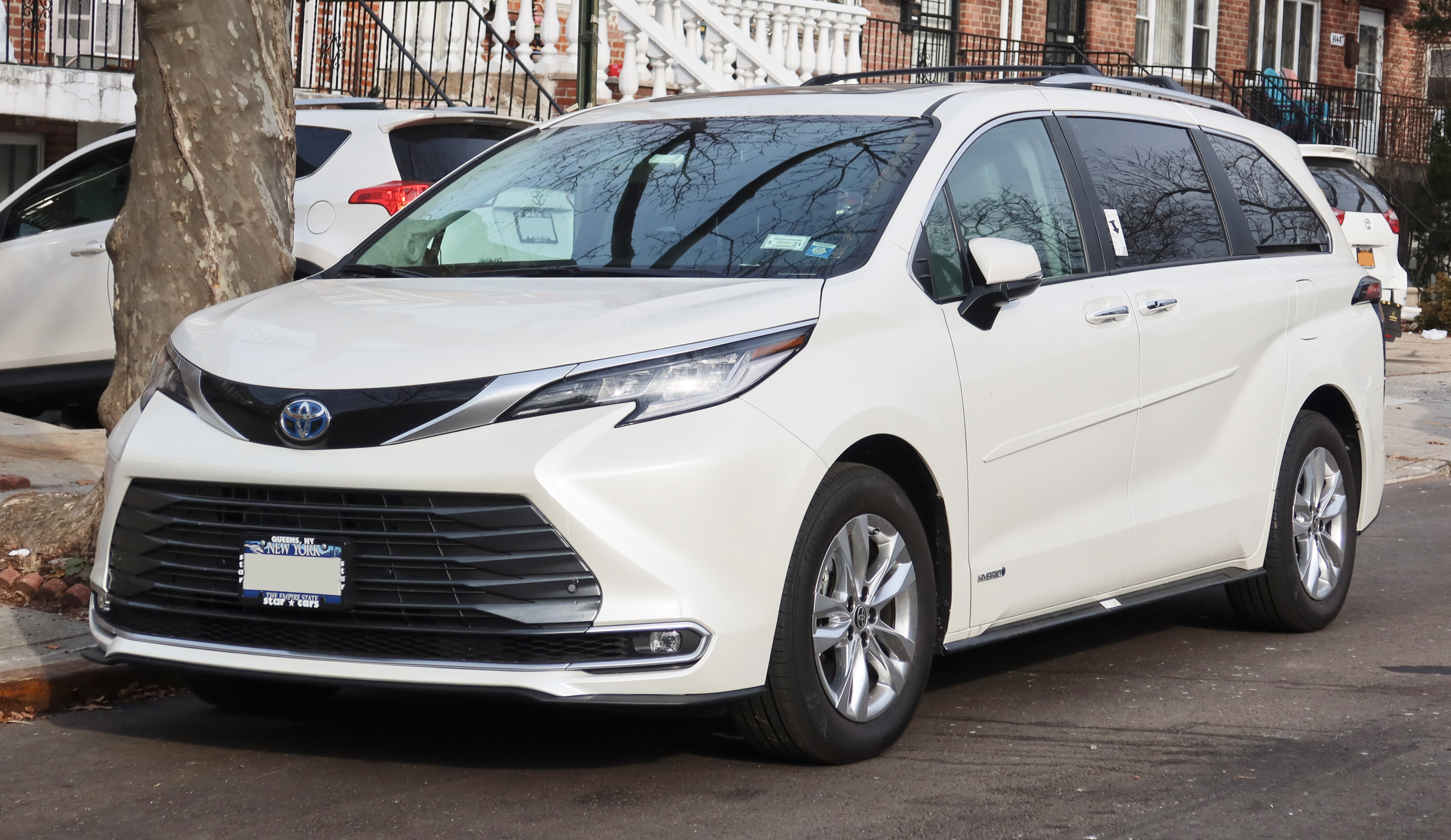
2021 Toyota Sienna Limited (AXLH40)

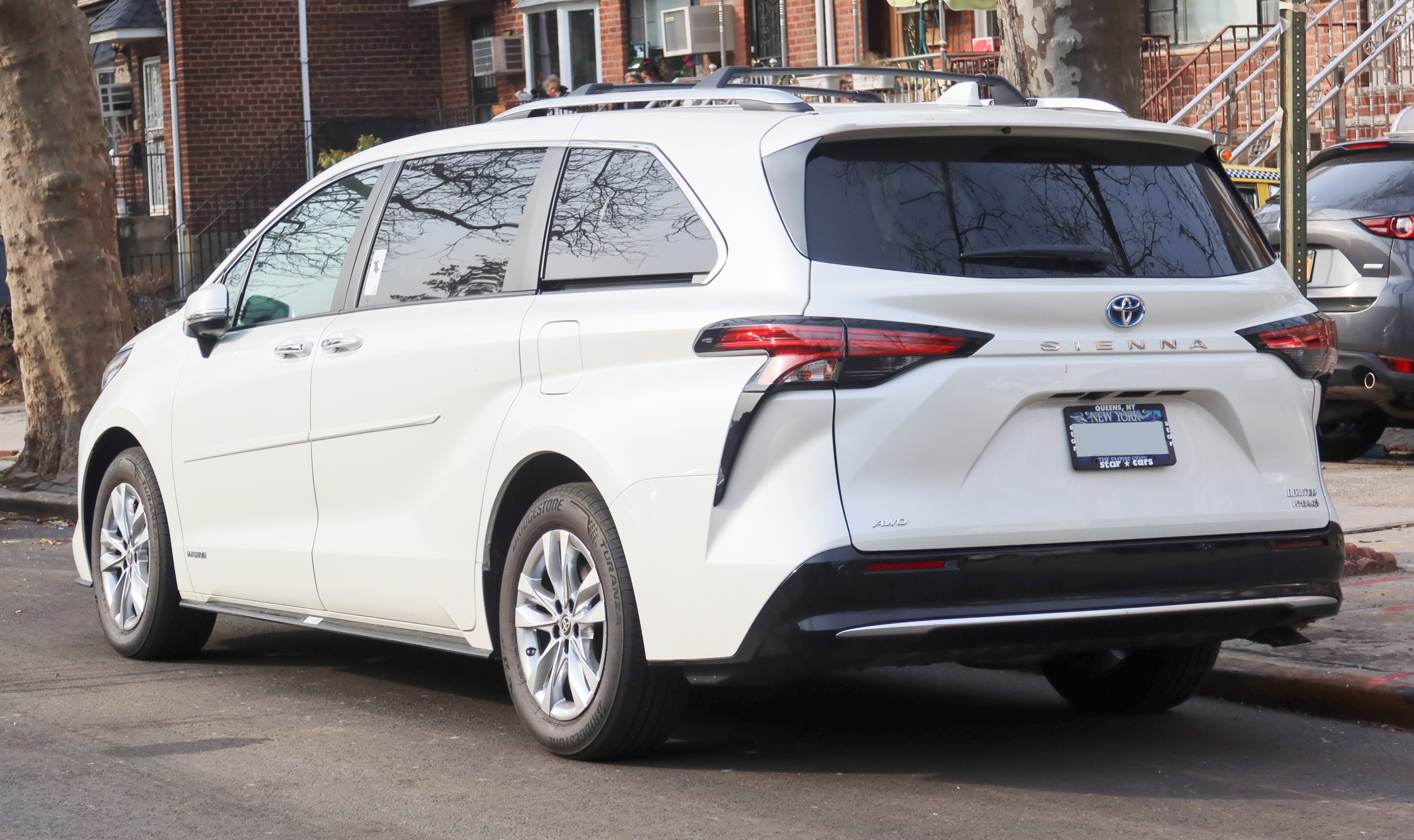
2021 Toyota Sienna Limited (AXLH40)

=== Yearly changes ===
- 2021, for the 2022 model year: The Woodland Edition based on the XLE trim was launched, with standard AWD, raised suspension, and tow package. Other changes are the XLE trim receive the option of 18-inch alloy wheels, and the Ottoman captain seats are available for the Limited and Platinum trims.
- 2022, for the 2023 model year: The Sienna 25th Anniversary Edition was introduced as a limited model with 2,525 units produced, featuring exclusive exterior and interior trim. It is based on the XSE trim.
- 2023, for the 2024 model year: The XSE Premium package was added. The LE and XLE trims receives darkened chrome accented headlights. The XSE AWD and Woodland trims receives a darker color for the wheels.
- 2024, for the 2025 model year: The Sienna received an interior update with a new Advanced Rear Seat Reminder to detect forgotten children and pets in the rear, Toyota's latest Audio Multimedia system with a 12.3-inch touchscreen (except on the LE trim that uses an 8-inch setup), a new 12.3-inch digital driver's display, the addition of built-in vacuum and refrigerator features, and updates to interior features and materials. The Woodland Edition and Platinum trims received new alloy wheel designs.
- 2025, for the 2026 model year: Heavy Metal added to the exterior color for the lineup and exterior colors Celestial Silver Metallic and Magnetic Gray Metallic removed from the lineup.
- 2026, for the 2027 model year: The Sienna received a minor facelift. Changes in the exterior include redesigned headlights and alloy wheels, and the Cypress exterior color was removed from the lineup. The next-generation hybrid powertrain is introduced and produces 251 HP. Changes in the interior and technology include a standard 12.3" touchscreen on all models, a redesigned steering wheel, an updated safety system from Toyota Safety Sense 2.0 to Toyota Safety Sense 4.0 on all models, and an updated multimedia system that debuted on the sixth-generation RAV4. The Limited trim level was discontinued from the lineup.

=== Safety ===
IIHS
Driver small overlap frontal offset	Good
Passenger small overlap frontal offset	Good
Moderate overlap frontal offset: original test	Good
Moderate overlap frontal offset: updated test (2023 models)	Marginal
Side impact: original test	Good
Side impact: updated test (2021-2023 models)	Good
Roof strength	Good

== Sales ==
Year	U.S.	Canada	Mexico	China	
Year	U.S.	Canada	Mexico	Sienna	Granvia
1997	15,180				
1998	81,391				
1999	98,809				
2000	103,137				
2001	88,469				
2002	80,915				
2003	105,499				
2004	159,119				
2005	161,380	5,322	7,083		
2006	163,269	11,579	6,950		
2007	138,162	9,820	6,580		
2008	115,944	7,000	4,363		
2009	84,064	6,345	3,303		
2010	98,337	9,960	5,619		
2011	111,429	10,835	7,215		
2012	114,725	11,858	7,032		
2013	121,117	11,756	5,434		
2014	124,502	11,596	4,861		
2015	137,497	13,981	5,438		
2016	127,791	13,404	5,727		
2017	111,489	15,770	6,478		
2018	87,672	15,117	7,022		
2019	73,585	14,631	6,898		
2020	42,885	8,821	4,459		
2021	107,990	11,869	8,619	2,791	
2022	69,751	5,883	5,507	74,381	
2023	66,539	4,482	3,710	76,575	48,773
2024	75,037	11,843		89,450	78,687
2025	101,486	15,218		92,214	70,579

== Awards ==
2004:

- Car and Driver's Five Best Trucks Van Award
- Edmunds Editor's Most Wanted Van
- Edmunds Consumers' Most Wanted

2010:

- Best Resale Value Award
- Insurance Institute for Highway Safety's "Top Safety Pick" Award (2011 model year only)

2019:

- Longest-Kept Minivan
