= Automobile Quarterly =

American automobile magazine

- Categories: Automobile magazine
- Frequency: Quarterly
- Founder: L. Scott Bailey
- Founded: Spring 1962
- Final issue: 2012
- Country: USA
- Based in: New Albany, Indiana
- Language: English
- ISSN: 0005-1438

Automobile Quarterly was a hardbound, advertising-free periodical publication focused on collectible cars. The publication was known for its quality writing and photography of automobiles, personalities and related subjects.

== History and profile ==
The magazine started in Spring of 1962 with the subtitle "The Connoisseur's Magazine of Motoring Today, Yesterday, and Tomorrow" or in the words of the founder—"a cross between The New Yorker and Encyclopædia Britannica in the world of auto mania". The founder and first editor was L. Scott Bailey (September 4, 1924 to June 26, 2012), working from offices in New York City. In 1963, an "office of publication" was opened in Kutztown, Pennsylvania, which operated first as Automobile Quarterly, Inc.

Bailey retired to live in the English Cotswolds and CBS Magazines purchased Automobile Quarterly in 1986 and then sold the magazine to Kutztown Publishing in 1988. In October 2000, Automobile Quarterly was sold to a newly formed company, Automobile Heritage Publishing & Communications, LLC, and relocated to New Albany, Indiana.

Vol. 52 (1) was the last issue published, in 2012.

Kaye Bowles Durnell, the final editor, ceased publication in 2012 and stored the materials. In late 2018, she donated the Automobile Quarterly collection to America's Packard Museum in Dayton, Ohio. The Museum is digitizing samples from the collection and they are available on the Museum's Omeka site.
