= Toyota concept vehicles (2000–2009) =

Automobile company Toyota designed and manufactured concept vehicles from 2000 to 2009. These vehicles were concepts and were never released to dealerships. Many were developed in conjunction with other corporations such as Sony or Subaru.

== Yaris Cabrio Concept (2000) ==
Toyota Yaris Cabrio Concept

Overview
- Manufacturer: Toyota
- Production: 2000

Body and chassis
- Body style: 2-door convertible
- Related: Toyota Vitz (XP10)

The Yaris Cabrio Concept was a two-door convertible presented at the March 2000 Geneva Motor Show. The Yaris Cabrio featured a fabric roof. It never reached the production stage.

== Celica Ultimate Concept (2000) ==
Toyota Celica Ultimate Concept

Overview
- Manufacturer: Toyota, Rod Millen Motorsports
- Production: 2000

Body and chassis
- Related: Toyota Celica (T230)

Dimensions
- Length: 4442 mm
- Width: 1735 mm
- Height: 1270 mm

The Toyota Celica Ultimate Concept was introduced in 2000. The project was a collaboration between Toyota and Rod Millen Motorsports. The Ultimate Concept uses the body from a seventh generation Celica GT-S, but the powertrain and all-wheel drive system from a prior generation Celica GT-Four. The turbocharged inline-four engine from the GT-Four was modified to produce 371 kW (497 hp) at 8,000 rpm and 461 N⋅m (340 lb⋅ft) of torque at 5,500 rpm. During testing, Millen was reportedly able to achieve a 0–97 km/h (0–60 mph) time of 4.9 seconds, a 97–161 km/h (60–100 mph) time of 6.7 seconds, and a 402 m (1/4 mile) time of 13.3 seconds at 174 km/h (108 mph). Millen says these figures were limited by turbo lag and the 5-speed manual transmission from the donor car. The concept also features redesigned front and rear suspension, upgraded brakes, and a fuel cell in the trunk. Most of the stock interior from the seventh-generation Celica was kept, with modifications such as an integrated and mostly hidden roll cage, Recaro seats with racing harnesses, no rear seats, and a race-style LED tachometer to keep up with the faster revving engine. The exterior of the car has also been restyled with a new body kit, hood, spoiler and wheels.

== ES^{3} (2001) ==
Toyota ES^{3}

Overview
- Manufacturer: Toyota
- Production: 2001

Powertrain
- Engine: 1.4 L 1ND-TV turbo diesel hybrid

The Toyota ES^{3} (Eco Spirit cubed) was a concept car made by Toyota in 2001. It was designed to use parts made from bioplastics. The ES^{3} was not made into a production vehicle but the technology was used in the Raum in 2003 under the name of Toyota Eco-Plastic.

== Pod (2001) ==
Toyota Pod
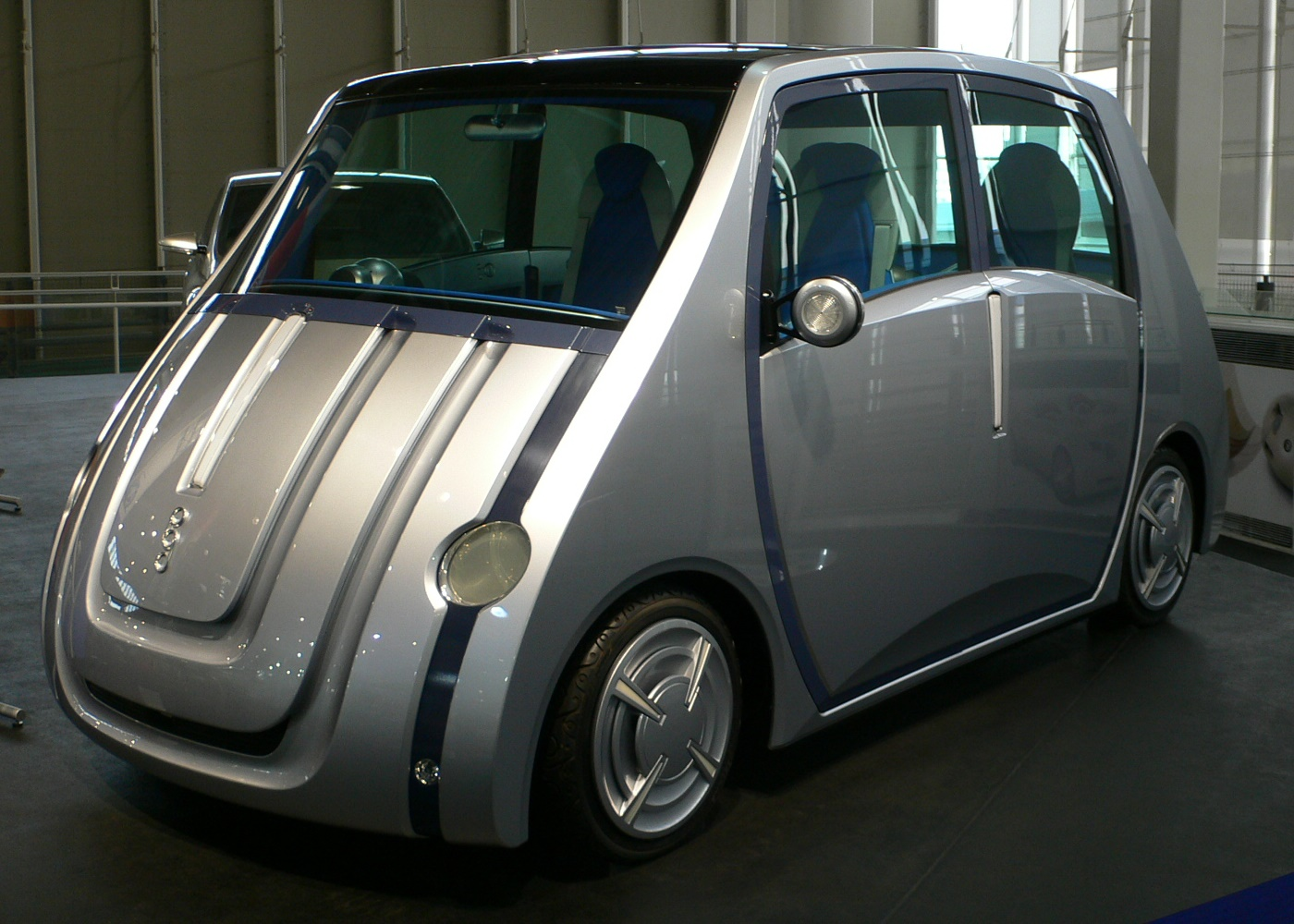

Overview
- Manufacturer: Toyota
- Production: 2001

Body and chassis
- Layout: FF layout

Powertrain
- Engine: 1.5 L 1NZ-FE I4

The Toyota Pod was a concept car created by Toyota in collaboration with Sony. The Pod was first shown at the October 2001 Tokyo Motor Show. The Pod was unique as it was designed with artificial intelligence systems built in to make the car appear more personal.

The Pod was much like a living being due to the artificial intelligence programmed into it. It featured a screen inside with Sony-created software running on it, capable of creating shopping lists and running music and radio. The car could also judge the attitude and mood of the driver based on their reactions and how they are driving, and could offer advice on how to improve their current mood. The seats inside are like stools which could freely spin and rotate. On the exterior, the Pod could express its own feelings with coloured LEDs - red for anger, yellow for happy, blue for sad - and an antenna that wags, much like a dog's tail. The Pod was designed as a "car of the future" and hence was never put into production.

The Pod was featured in the game Gran Turismo Concept and had an exclusive race to itself. A new track - using segments from the Clubman Stage Route 5 course - was created which involved 6 Pods driving through the pitlane backwards before stopping in a special area for several seconds before being allowed to resume racing.

== DMT (2001) ==
Toyota DMT

Overview
- Manufacturer: Toyota
- Production: 2001

Body and chassis
- Body style: Minivan
- Platform: Previa

Powertrain
- Engine: 2.4 L 2AZ-FE I4

Chronology
- Successor: HiAce (H200)

The Toyota DMT (Dual Mode Traveller) was a concept van made by Toyota and first shown at the October 2001 Tokyo Motor Show. The van had a high mounted driving position and a rear cabin designed to be useful as an office or studio. Its design cues were later used in the HiAce H200.

== FXS (2001) ==
Toyota FXS
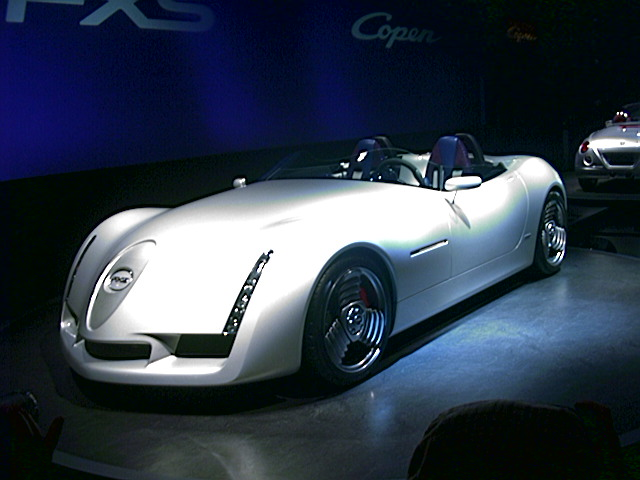

Overview
- Manufacturer: Toyota
- Production: 2001

Body and chassis
- Class: Sports car
- Body style: 2-door coupe
- Layout: FR layout
- Platform: Soarer

Powertrain
- Engine: 4.3 L 3UZ-FE DOHC V8; 282 hp
- Transmission: 6-speed sequential manual

Dimensions
- Length: 4,150 mm (163.4 in)
- Width: 1,870 mm (73.6 in)
- Height: 1,110 mm (43.7 in)
- Curb weight: 1,300 kg (2,866 lb)

The Toyota FXS (Future eXperimental Sports) was a concept car made by Toyota and first shown at the October 2001 Tokyo Motor Show, and later at the March 2002 Geneva Motor Show. Based on the Soarer, the coupe was powered by a 4.3 L 3UZ-FE V8 engine using a 6-speed sequential manual gearbox.

== RSC (2001) ==
Toyota RSC
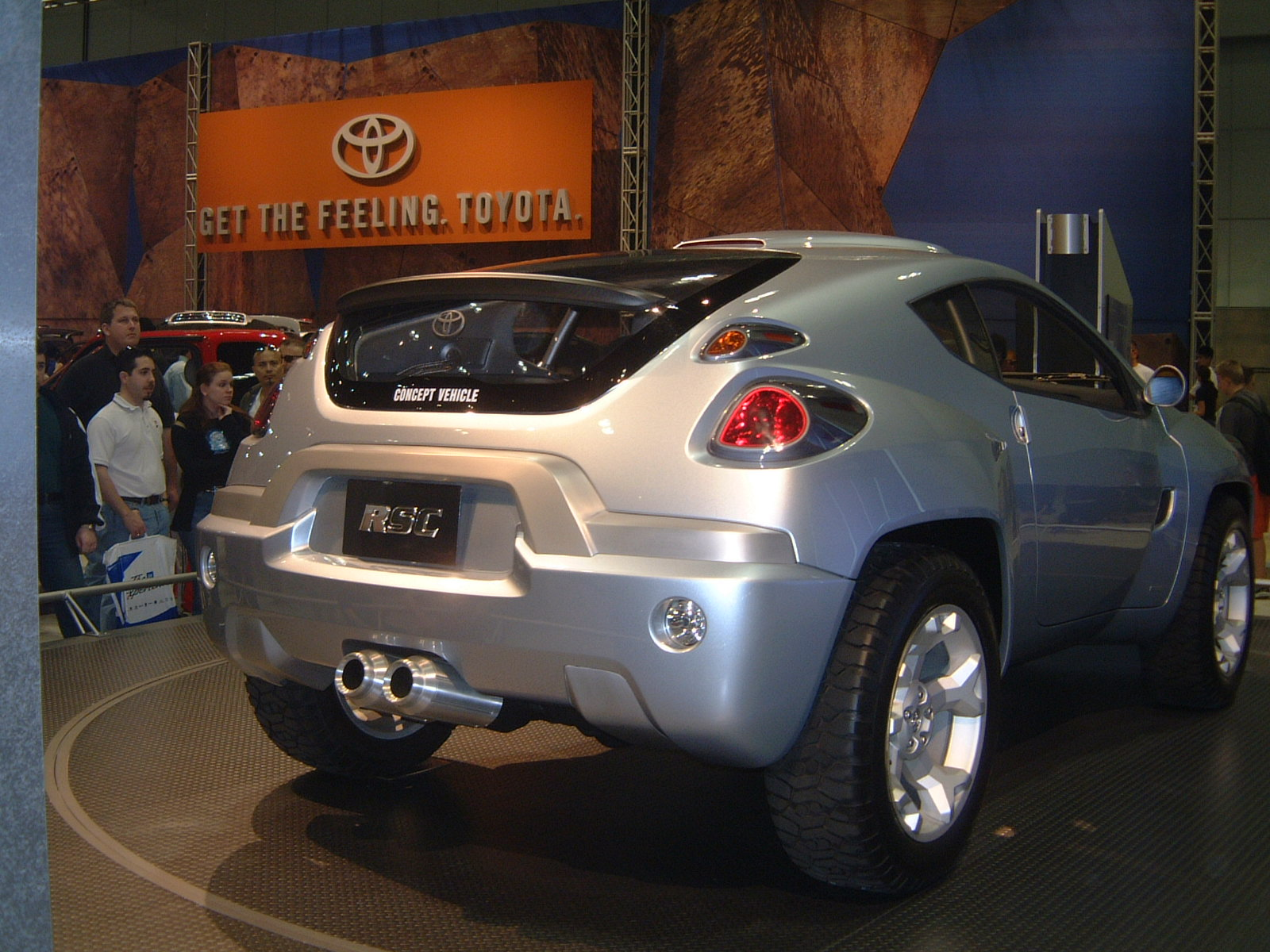

Overview
- Manufacturer: Toyota
- Production: 2001
- Designer: Craig Kember, Kevin Hunter (Calty)

Body and chassis
- Body style: 2-door SUV
- Layout: 4WD
- Platform: RAV4

Powertrain
- Engine: 4.2 L Naturally-aspirated V8

Dimensions
- Wheelbase: 2,490 mm (98 in)
- Length: 4,115 mm (162 in)
- Width: 1,850 mm (73 in)
- Height: 1,550 mm (61 in)

The Toyota RSC ("Rugged Sport Coupe") was a Toyota two-door SUV concept car that was first shown at the February 2001 Chicago Auto Show.

The RSC was designed by Calty as a 'pure concept vehicle', with no intention to go into production but to 'connect emotionally with young buyers'. Design cues came from rally cars used in the World Rally Championships, with functional lines, a lack of luxury features and 'designed to convey the sparse, functional simplicity of a race car'. The RSC was based on the RAV4.

The RSC was never made into a production vehicle.

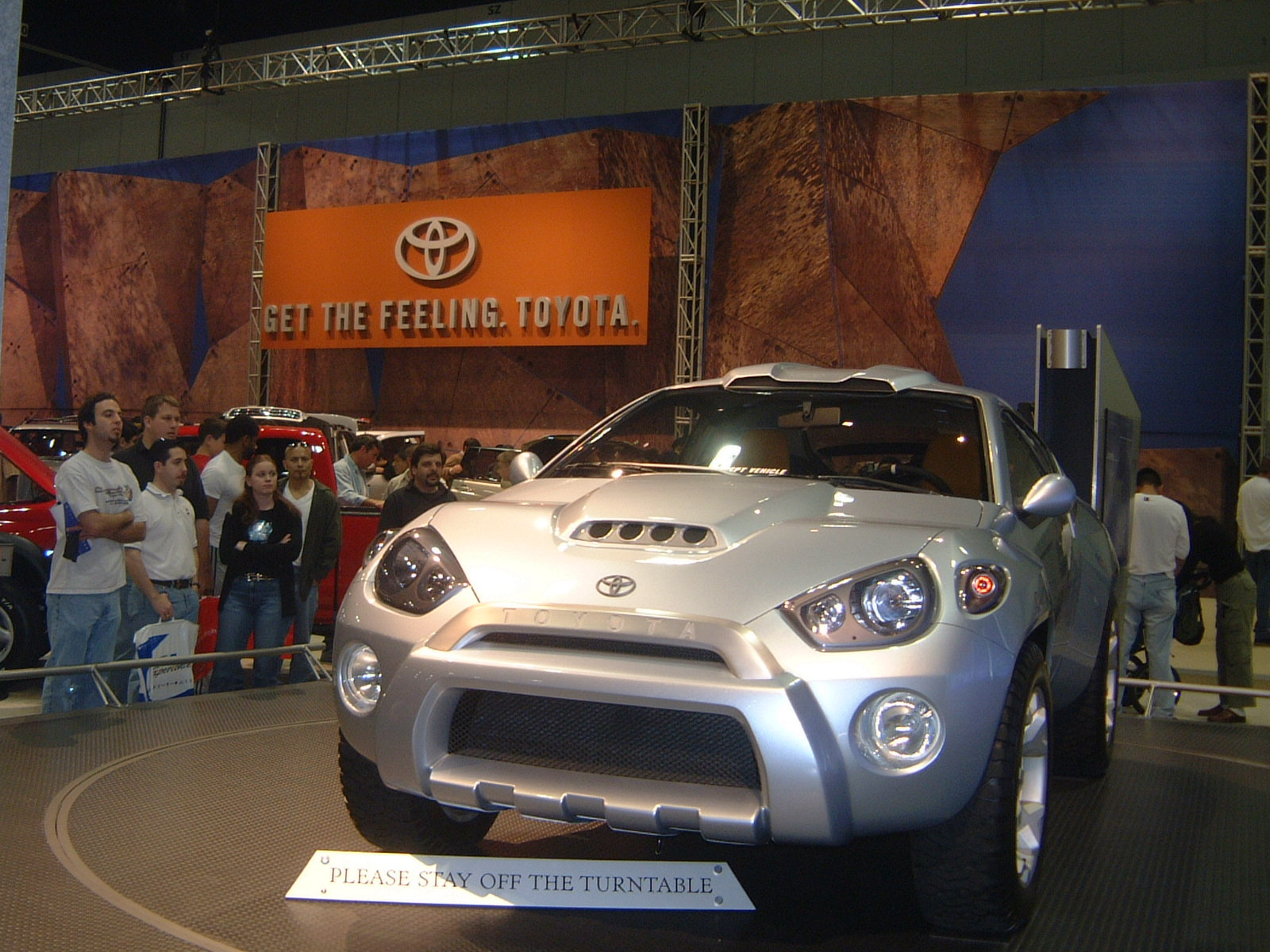
RSC at the 2002 LA Auto Show

== FCHV-3 (2001) ==
Toyota FCHV-3

Overview
- Manufacturer: Toyota
- Production: 2001

Body and chassis
- Body style: SUV

Powertrain
- Engine: Hydrogen fuel cell

Chronology
- Predecessor: Toyota FCHV-2
- Successor: Toyota FCHV-4

The FCHV-3 was powered by a 90 kW fuel cell, more than four times the power of the FCHV-1, and had a top speed of 150 km/h (94 mph) and a range of 250 km (155 miles). It was developed on the body of a Toyota Highlander.

== FCHV-4 (2001) ==
Toyota FCHV-4
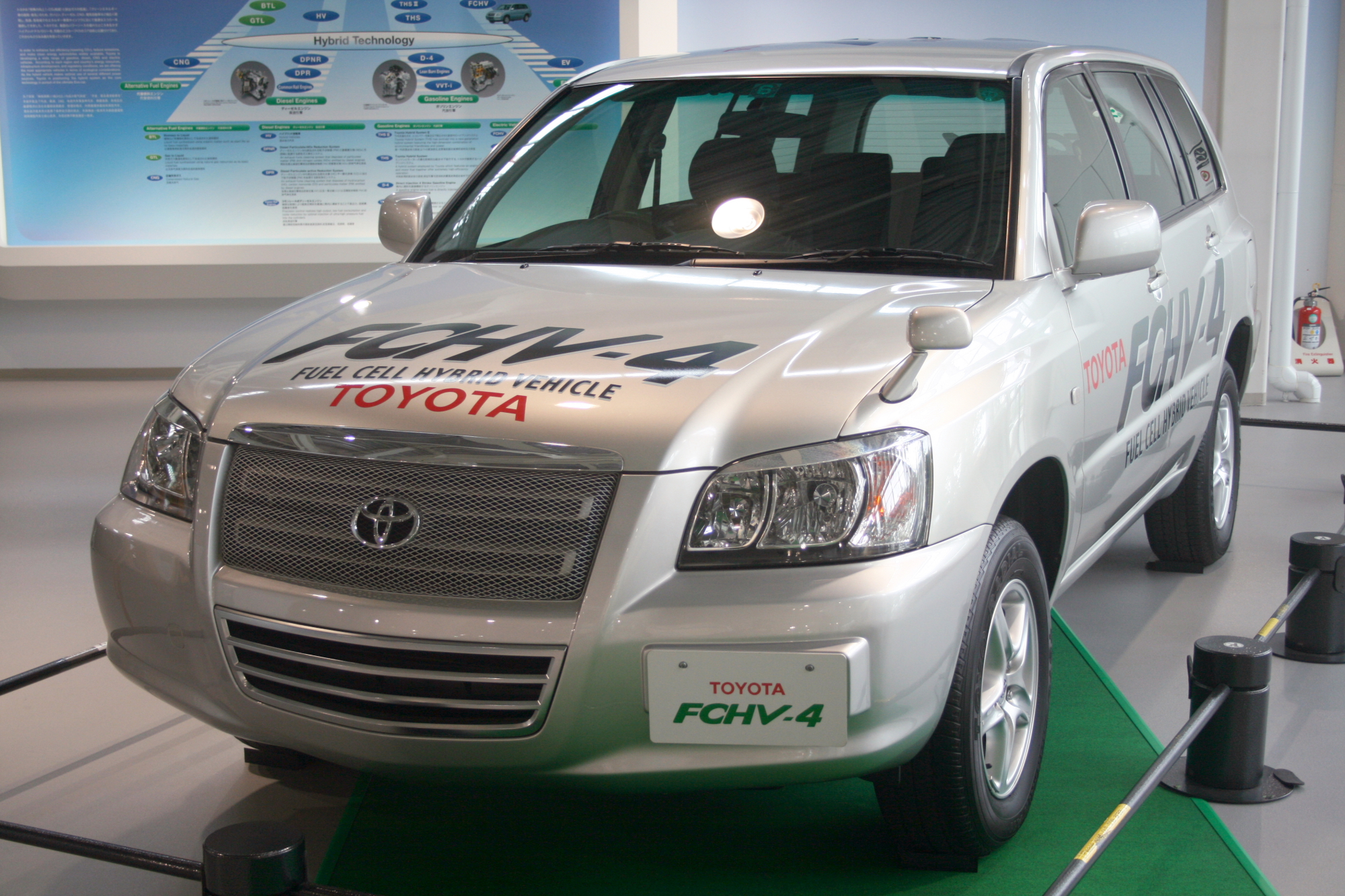

Overview
- Manufacturer: Toyota
- Production: 2001

Body and chassis
- Body style: SUV

Powertrain
- Engine: Hydrogen fuel cell

Chronology
- Predecessor: Toyota FCHV-3
- Successor: Toyota FCHV-5

The FCHV-4 (Fuel Cell Hybrid Vehicle 4) was the fourth vehicle built by Toyota in its Fuel Cell Vehicle program. It was the first model to be approved for public road testing in Japan, and road tests continued until 2004. Through leasing programs in the US and Japan, it was the first to be commercialised. Like the FCHV-3, it was based on the Highlander.

== FCHV-5 (2001) ==
Toyota FCHV-5

Overview
- Manufacturer: Toyota
- Production: 2001

Body and chassis
- Body style: SUV

Powertrain
- Engine: Hydrogen fuel cell

Chronology
- Predecessor: Toyota FCHV-4
- Successor: Toyota FCHV-adv

The Clean Hydrocarbon Fuel (CHF) reformer of the FCHV-5 was equipped with a newly developed catalyst and heat exchanger to improve acceleration and fuel economy. Like the FCHV-3 and FCHV-4, it was based on the Highlander.

== Project Go (2002) ==
Toyota Project Go

Overview
- Manufacturer: Toyota
- Production: 2002

The Toyota Project Go is a concept race car made by Toyota, and shown at the 2002 Sydney Motor Show.

== Matrix Sport (2002) ==
Toyota Matrix Sport

Overview
- Manufacturer: Toyota
- Production: 2002

Body and chassis
- Body style: Hatchback
- Layout: FWD

Powertrain
- Engine: 1.8L I-4 DOHC 4 cylinder
- Transmission: 6-speed manual

Chronology
- Predecessor: first generation Matrix

The Toyota Matrix Sport is a sport wagon made by Toyota in 2002. The concept is based on the first generation Matrix.

== UUV (2002) ==
Toyota UUV (2002)

Overview
- Manufacturer: Toyota
- Production: 2002

Dimensions
- Length: 4,430 mm
- Width: 1,820 mm
- Height: 1,650 mm

The UUV is a concept car made by Toyota, and shown at the 2002 Geneva Motor Show, and later the Swiss Motor Show. UUV stands for Urban Utility Vehicle. Toyota used a feature called Glass Vision, which is a full-width, dash mounted screen which offers entertainment and navigational functions to both driver and passenger.

== MR2 Street Affair (2002) ==
Toyota MR2 Street Affair
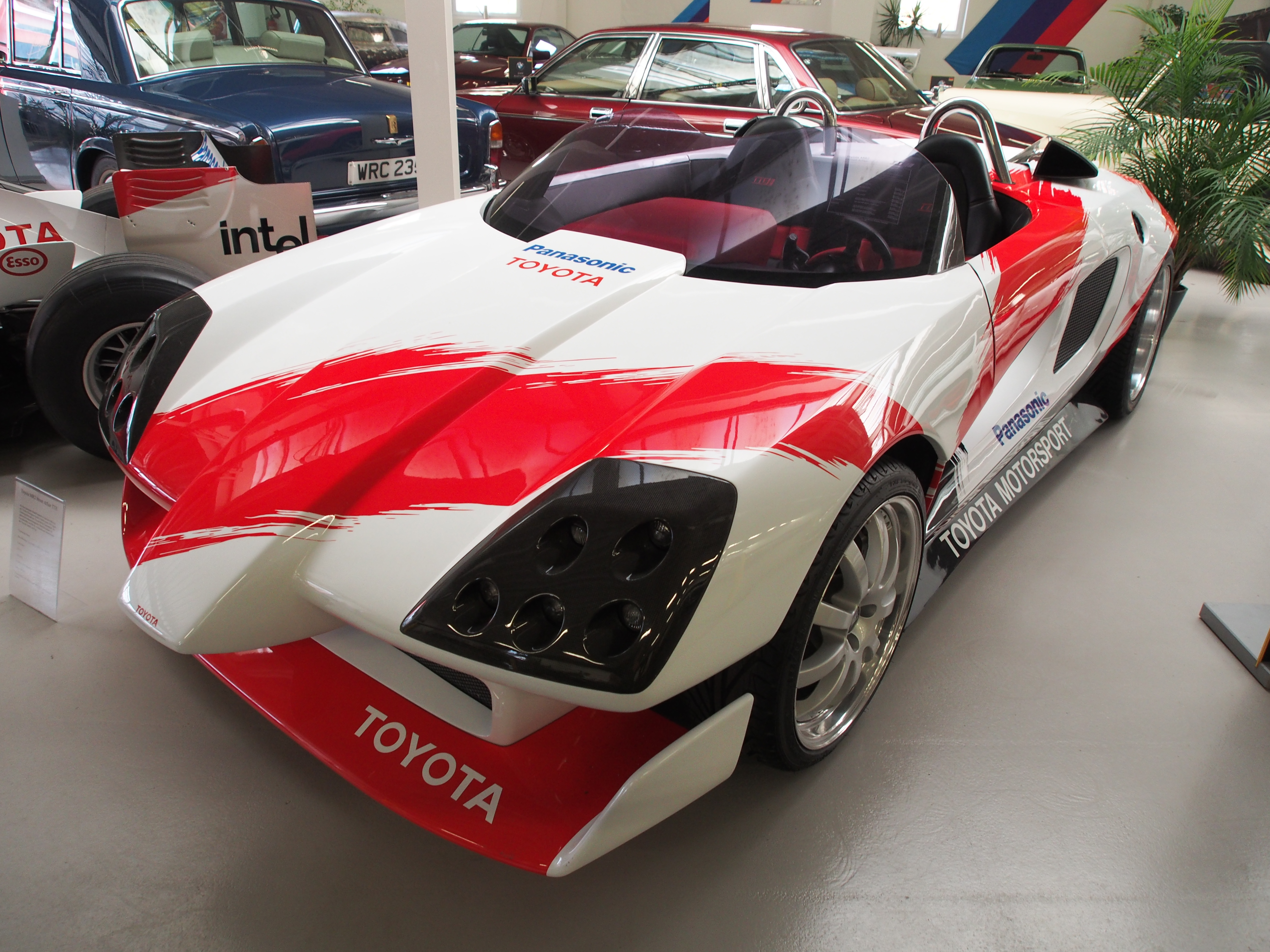

Overview
- Manufacturer: Toyota
- Production: 2002

Body and chassis
- Platform: MR2

The Toyota MR2 Street Affair was a Toyota concept sports car based on the MR2 that was designed by Toyota Germany.

A turbocharger was added to the engine to lift power from 100 kW to 193 kW. The body was made from fibreglass, with carbon fibre panels and numerous air scoops leading to the engine bay. The front took style cues from Toyota's Formula 1 car, having a pointed nose and a front wing close to the ground with Formula 1 style wing-lets in front of semi-exposed tyres. The rear mirror was replaced with a camera.

== ccX (2002) ==
Toyota ccX

Overview
- Manufacturer: Toyota
- Production: 2002

Dimensions
- Length: 4331 mm
- Width: 1445 mm
- Height: 1554 mm

The Toyota ccX (stands for Coupe Crossover) was introduced at the 2002 North American International Auto Show. The ccX combines the styling of a sporty coupe with the cargo capability of a light-duty SUV. Designed in Japan and built in Italy, ccX features strong sweeping lines, sharp surface edges, a tall sloping roofline, rounded front and rear contours, two large power sunroofs, and a vertical glass rear panel, that can be retracted into the bumper. Inside, ccX features a metal-and-rubber waterproof floor that includes four drain plugs for easy cleaning and see-through bucket seats, as well as mesh netting that can comfortably accommodate four passengers. A blue instrument cluster is mounted in the center of the dash for reduced driver fatigue and better visibility, and a seven-inch multi-display monitor displays DVD, navigation, and audio functions. Powering the front-wheel-drive ccX is a 2.4-liter DOHC four-cylinder engine that is linked to a four-speed automatic transmission.

It was also shown in 2003 as the Scion ccX.

== SU-HV1 (2003) ==
Toyota SU-HV1

Overview
- Manufacturer: Toyota
- Also called: Lexus RX
- Production: 2003

Body and chassis
- Class: Luxury SUV

Powertrain
- Engine: 3.3-liter V6 gasoline engine + 120kW motor + 50kW rear motor

The Toyota SU-HV1 is a concept car made by Toyota, and shown at the 2003 Tokyo Motor Show. It entered production as the Lexus RX. The SU-HV1 features an SUV-optimized Hybrid Synergy Drive and E-Four. The hybrid system power unit comprises a 3.3-liter V6 gasoline engine together with a 120 kW motor. The concept includes VDM and Electronically Controlled Brake System (ECB).

== Land Cruiser FJ45 Concept (2003) ==
Toyota Land Cruiser FJ45 Concept

Overview
- Manufacturer: Toyota
- Production: 2003
- Designer: Rod Millen Motorsport

Powertrain
- Engine: 4.7-litre 2UZ-FE V8

Chronology
- Predecessor: 1967 Toyota Land Cruiser

The Toyota Land Cruiser FJ45 is a concept vehicle made in 2003 by the Rod Miller group for Toyota Motor Sales USA. An original 1967 FJ45 Land Cruiser wagon body was widened to fit onto a Land Cruiser 100 chassis and drive train. The 4.7-L V8 engine was set back 20 cm (8 in) to fit the engine bay. A custom independent rear suspension was made and the front suspension was modified for increased travel.

== CS&S (2003) ==
Toyota CS&S
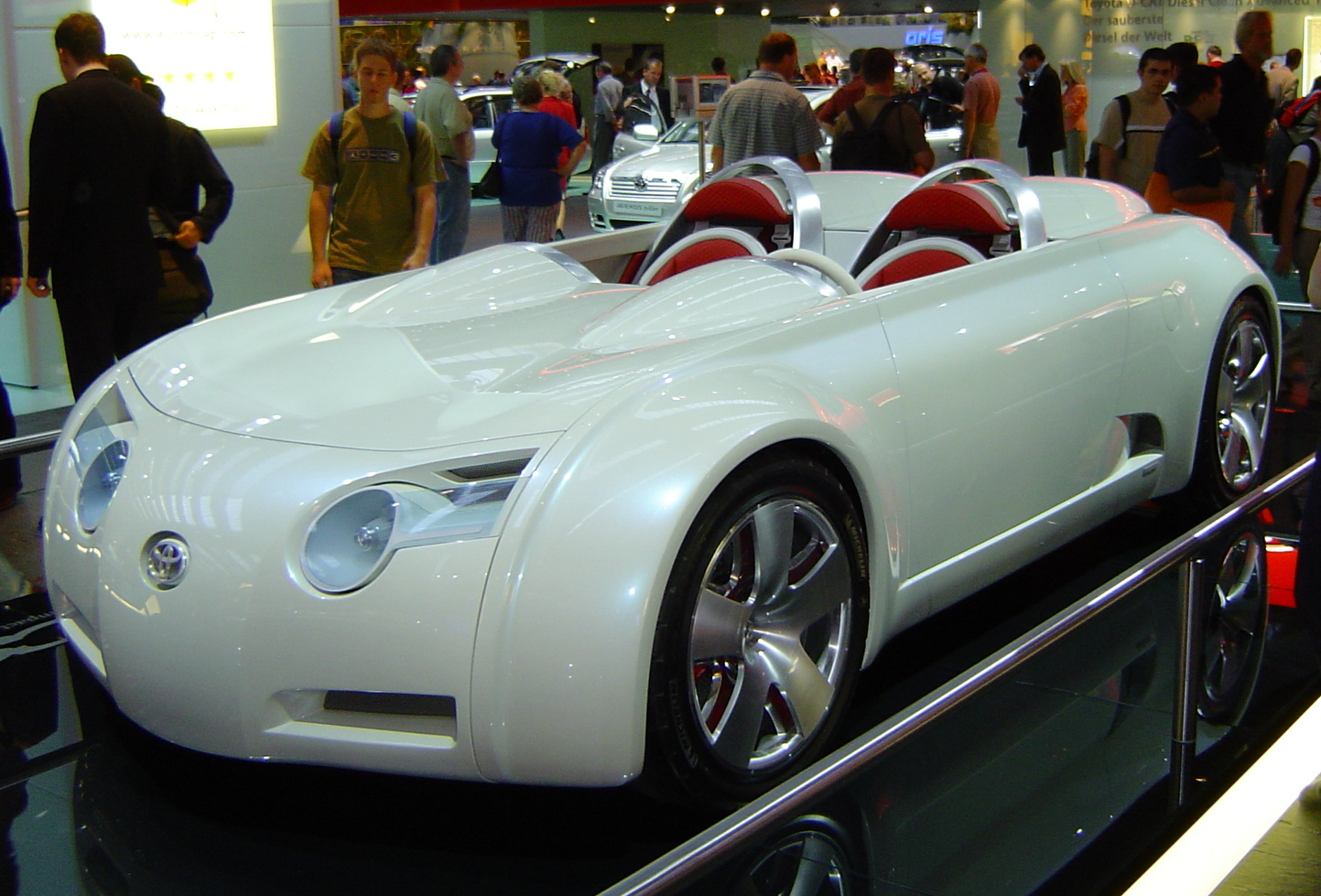

Overview
- Manufacturer: Toyota
- Production: 2003

Body and chassis
- Body style: 2+2 roadster
- Layout: M4

Powertrain
- Engine: 1.5 L 1NZ-FXE I4 + electric motor
- Transmission: fixed ratio

The Toyota CS&S is a four-wheel drive, mid-engine sports car concept made by Toyota and displayed in 2003. It utilizes a hybrid system combining electric motors to drive the front wheels, and a combination of a petrol engine and electric motors powering the rear. It is the first Toyota vehicle to have the feature Toyota Space Touch, a system in which the driver "touches" holographic projections to control other systems (e.g. air conditioning) inside the car.

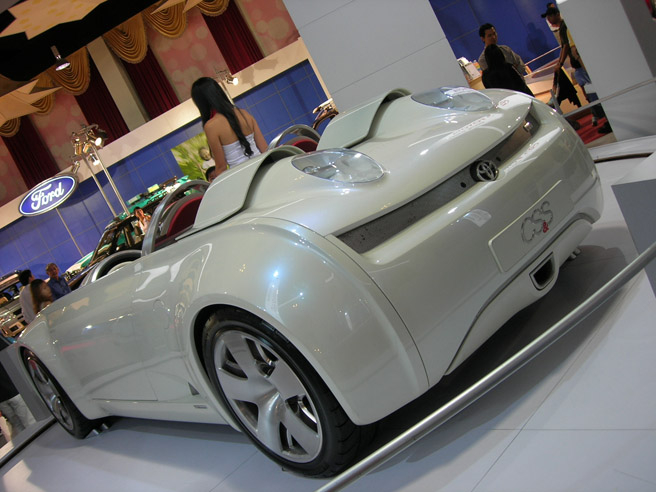
Rear

== PM (2003) ==
Toyota PM
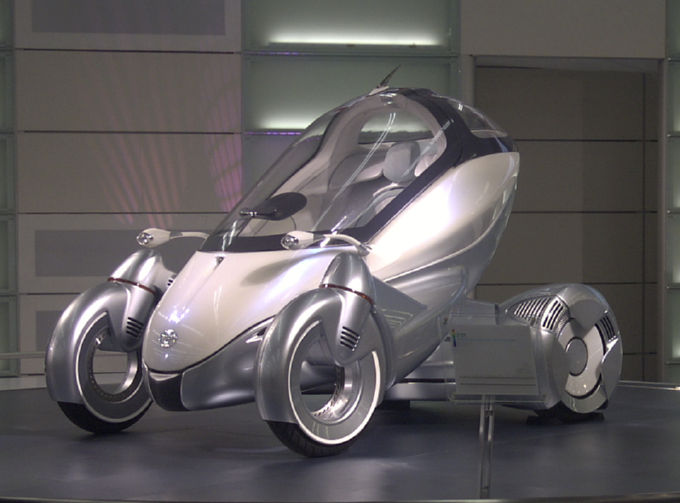

Overview
- Manufacturer: Toyota
- Production: 2003

The Toyota PM is a single seat concept vehicle built by Toyota around the idea of personal mobility. Multiple vehicles can communicate with each other to encourage "meeting, linking and hanging out together". It was shown at the October 2003 Tokyo Motor Show.

== NLSV (2003) ==
Toyota NLSV

Overview
- Manufacturer: Toyota
- Production: 2003

Body and chassis
- Body style: 3-door van

The Toyota NLSV is a concept vehicle built by Toyota and first shown at the October 2003 Tokyo Motor Show. It had a high roof, a low, flat floor and the door slid back on rails so that even disabled passengers could enter. The front passenger seat could be folded up and slid forward under the dash to make even more room for wheel chairs or cargo.

It entered production as the Toyota Porte.

== X Runner (2003) ==
Toyota X Runner
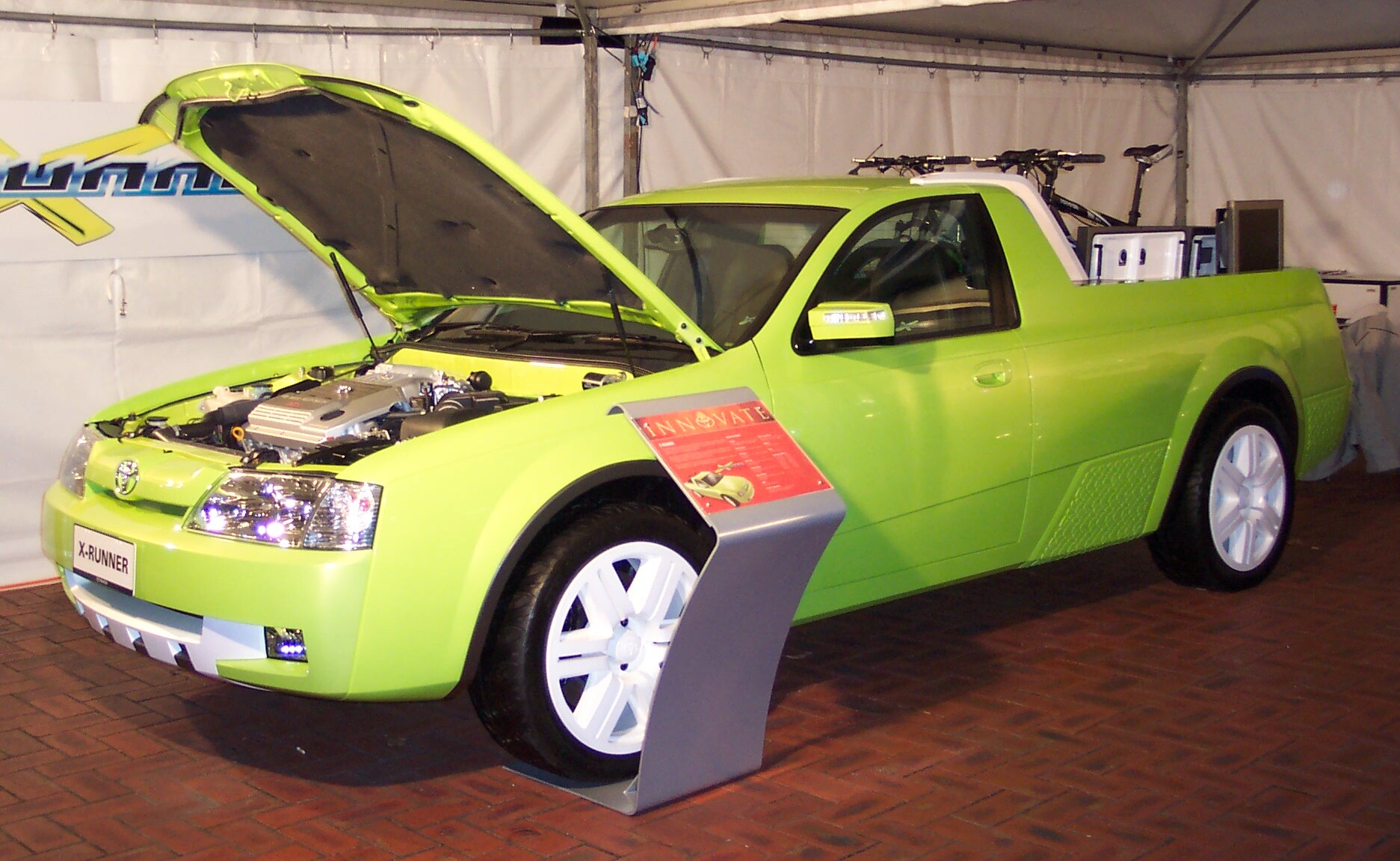

Overview
- Manufacturer: Toyota Australia
- Production: 2003
- Assembly: Altona, Victoria

Body and chassis
- Body style: Coupé utility
- Layout: 4WD
- Platform: Toyota K platform
- Related: Toyota Avalon (XX10) (for Australian market)

Powertrain
- Engine: Supercharged 3.0L 1MZ-FE V6

Dimensions
- Wheelbase: 2,870 mm (113 in)
- Length: 4,905 mm (193 in)
- Width: 1,910 mm (75 in)
- Height: 1,520 mm (60 in)
- Curb weight: 1,710 kg (3,770 lb)

The Toyota X Runner is a four-wheel drive coupé utility concept vehicle designed and built by Toyota Australia in 2003.

The X-Runner was based on the Avalon, using the Avalon's front cabin, front sheet metal (except the grille) and mechanicals. The Avalon's chassis (the Toyota K platform, also shared with the Camry) was stretched by 150 mm just before the rear wheels. The 1MZ-FE engine was upgraded with a TRD supercharger. Transmission is by a version of the viscous coupled four-wheel-drive system used in the Lexus RX300. The front suspension kept the MacPherson struts from the Avalon with upgraded brakes and 19" wheels. The rear axle and suspension was modified from the Tarago 4WD van.

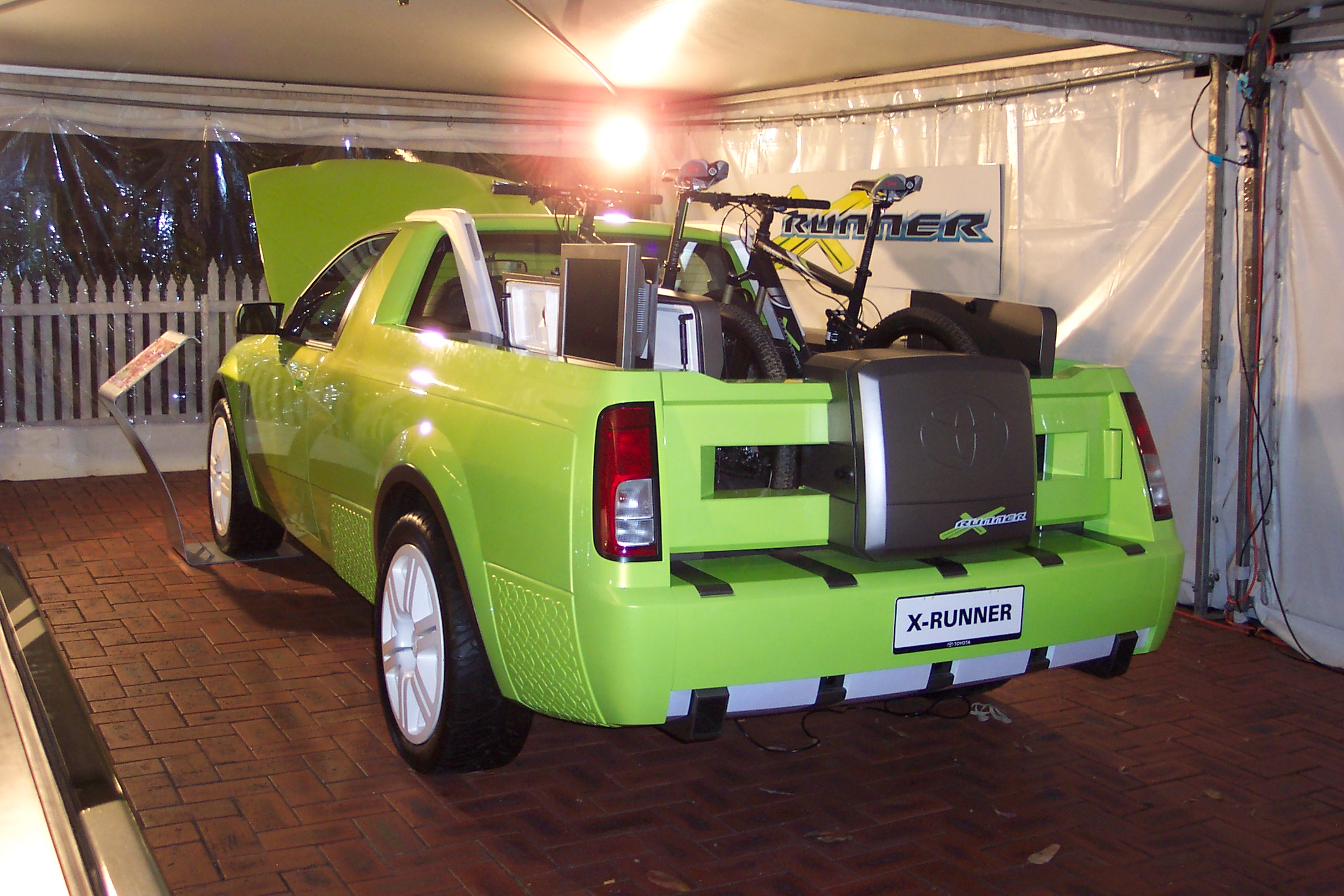
Rear

== Rugged Youth Utility (2003) ==
Toyota Rugged Youth Utility

Overview
- Manufacturer: Toyota
- Production: 2003

Chronology
- Successor: FJ Cruiser

The Rugged Youth Utility was a 4WD concept vehicle that was first shown at the January 2003 North American International Auto Show. It had styling cues reminiscent of the FJ40 Landcruiser but based on the modern Land Cruiser Prado platform. It was not meant to be a production vehicle but demand was high enough that it was put into production in early 2006 as the FJ Cruiser.

== Fine-S (2003) ==
Toyota Fine-S
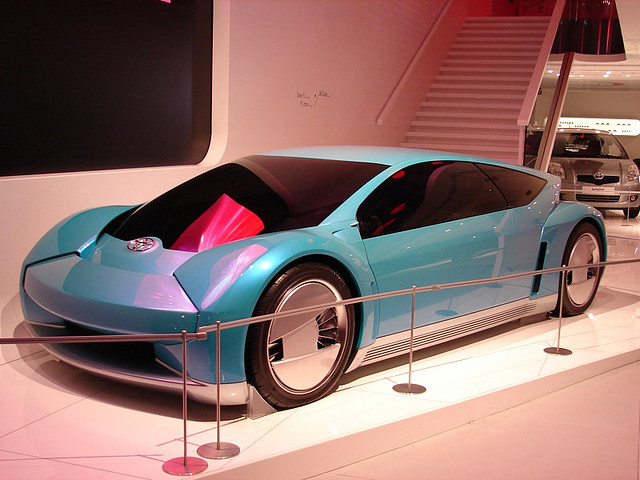

Overview
- Manufacturer: Toyota
- Production: 2003

Powertrain
- Engine: hydrogen fuel cell electric hybrid

Dimensions
- Wheelbase: 3,100 mm (122.0 in)
- Length: 4,355 mm (171.5 in)
- Width: 1,820 mm (71.7 in)
- Height: 1,495 mm (58.9 in)

Chronology
- Successor: Fine-N

The Fine-S (Fuel cell INnovative Emotion-Sport) was a concept vehicle that was shown at the January 2003 North American International Auto Show and the March 2003 Geneva Motor Show. The Fine-S uses a hydrogen fuel cell electric hybrid system which drives four independent electric motors - one in each wheel.

== Fine-N (2003) ==
Toyota Fine-N
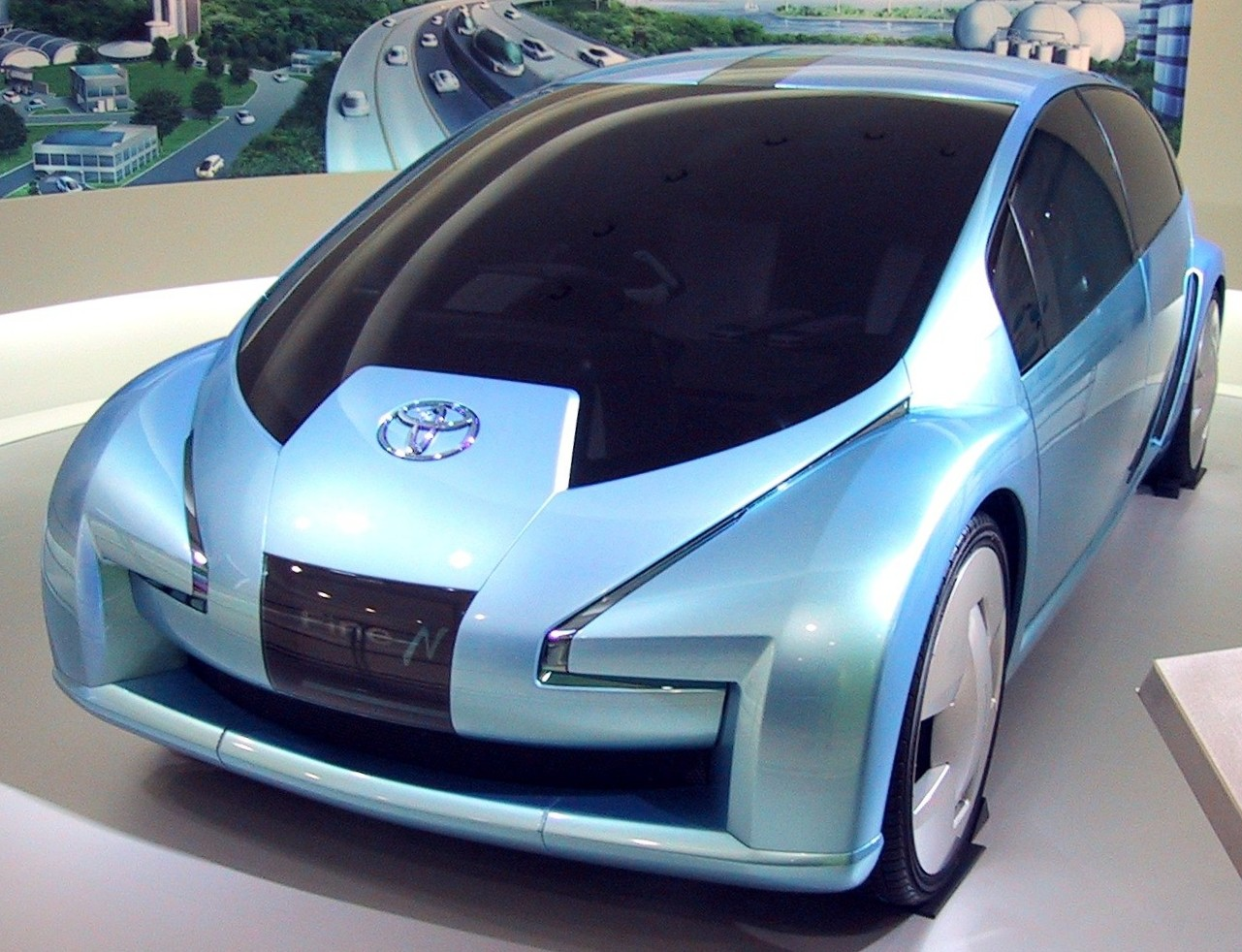

Overview
- Manufacturer: Toyota
- Production: 2003

Powertrain
- Engine: hydrogen fuel cell electric hybrid

Dimensions
- Wheelbase: 3,100 mm (122.0 in)
- Length: 4,355 mm (171.5 in)
- Width: 1,820 mm (71.7 in)
- Height: 1,495 mm (58.9 in)

Chronology
- Predecessor: Fine-S
- Successor: Fine-X

The Fine-N was a concept vehicle that was an update to the Fine-S and was shown at the October 2003 Tokyo Motor Show and the January 2004 North American International Auto Show.

The Fine-N uses a hydrogen fuel cell electric hybrid system which drives four independent 25 kW electric motors - one in each wheel. The hybrid system uses a Lithium-ion battery under the seats. Control is by drive-by-wire.

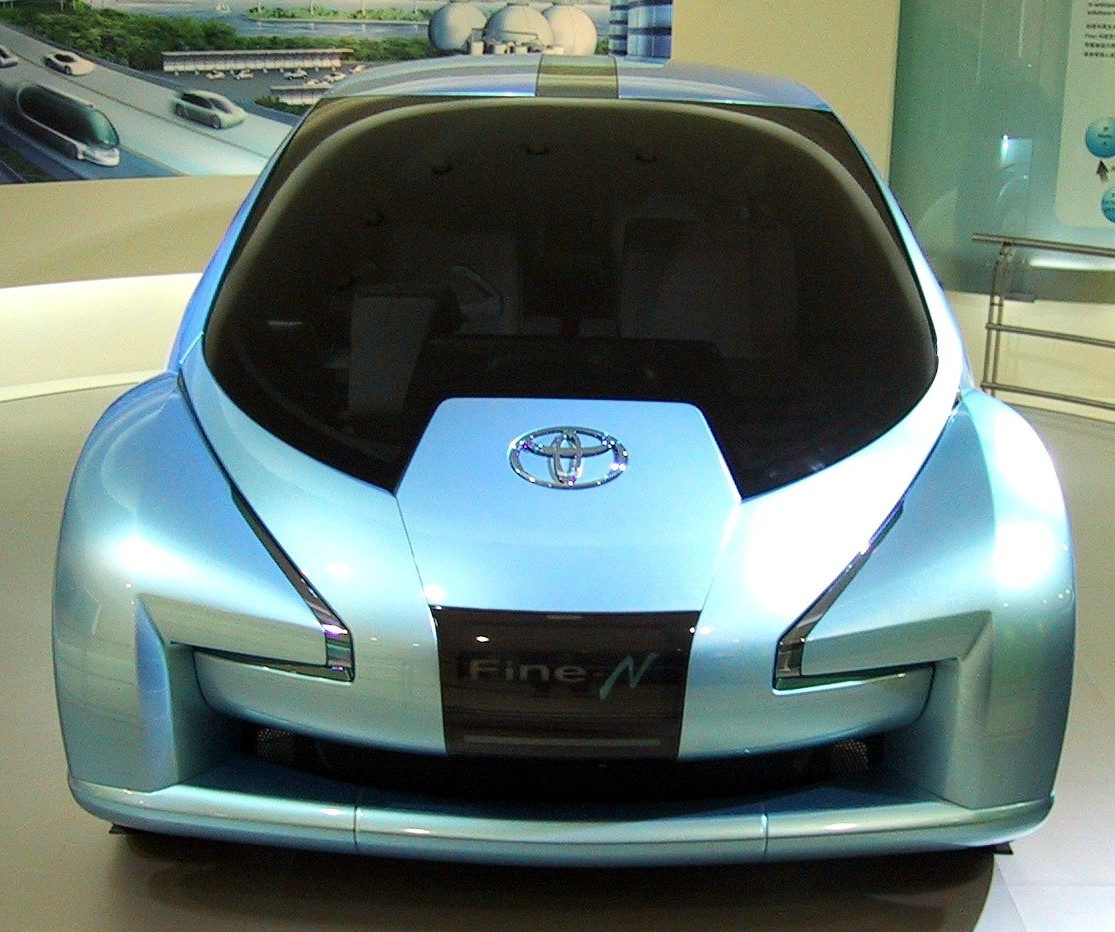
Front

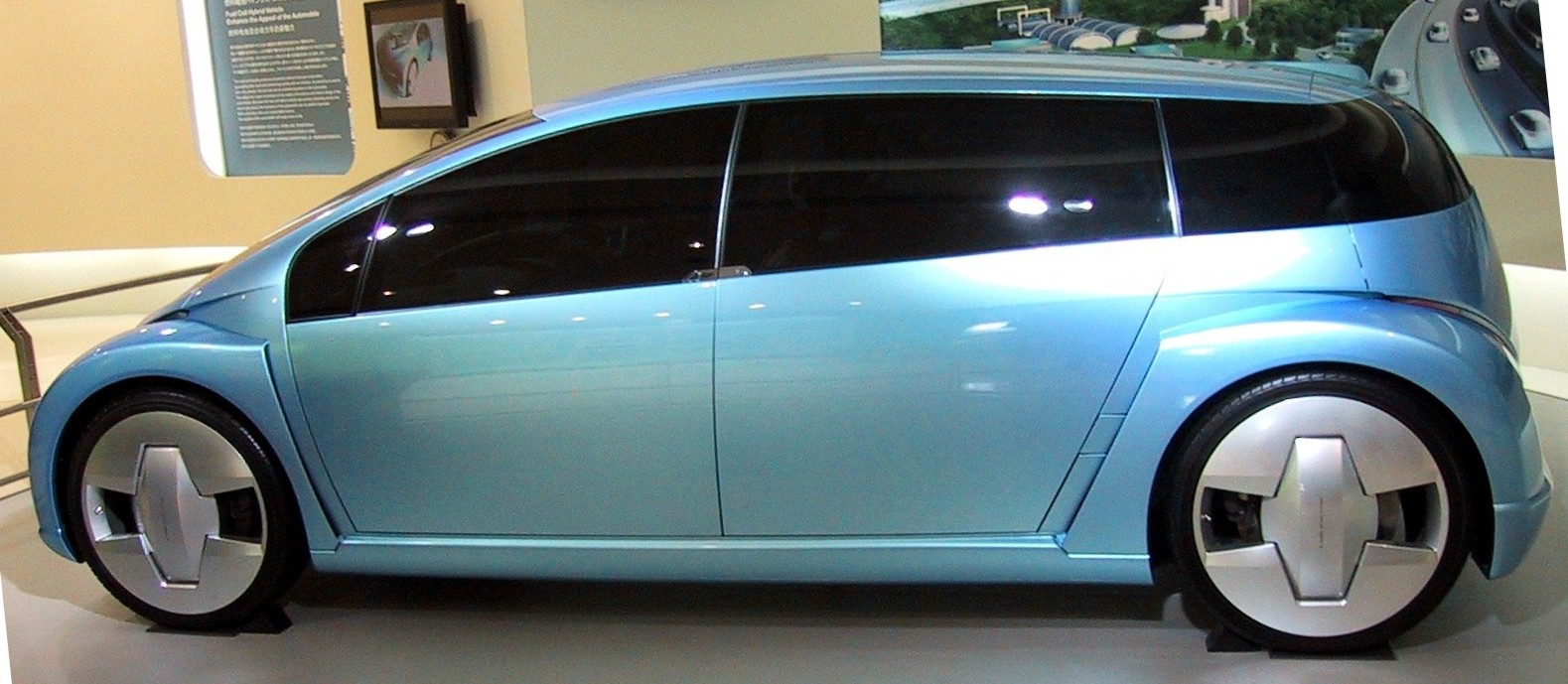
Side

== Alessandro Volta (2004) ==
Toyota Alessandro Volta
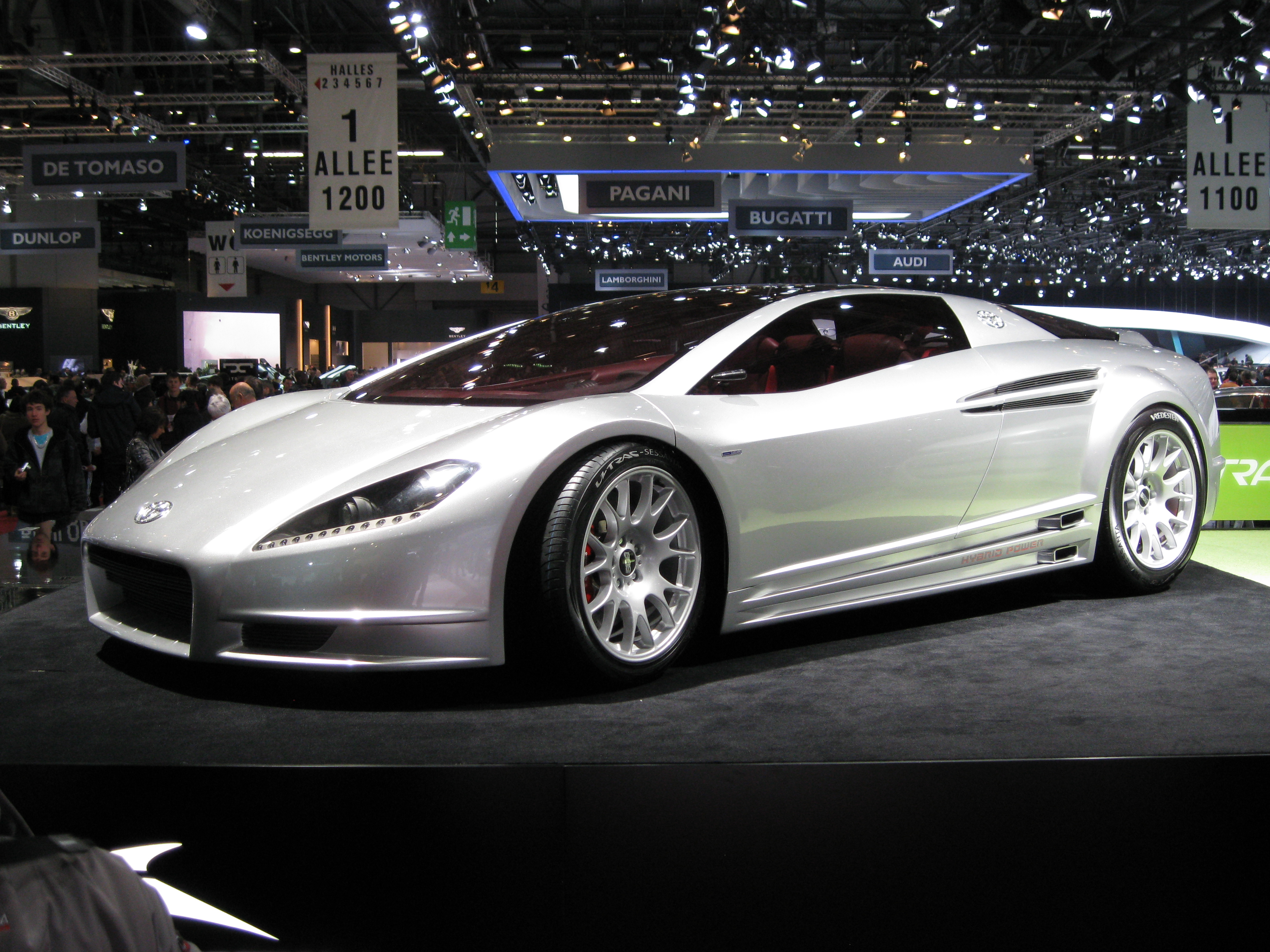

Overview
- Manufacturer: Toyota
- Production: 2004
- Designer: Italdesign Giugiaro

Body and chassis
- Class: Sports car
- Body style: 2-door coupe
- Layout: MR layout
- Doors: Scissor doors

Powertrain
- Engine: 3.3 L 3MZ-FE V6 hybrid electric

The Alessandro Volta is a concept car developed in the collaboration of the Japanese manufacturer Toyota and the Italian design company Italdesign Giugiaro. The concept vehicle named after Alessandro Volta, the Italian physicist who invented the battery (and the namesake of the volt unit of measurement), was officially unveiled at the 2004 Geneva Motor Show as a study of a hybrid electric sports car. The concept never materialised as a production car due to high costs involved.

The car had scissor doors and was built on a carbon fibre chassis and it featured 3 seats with the driver seated in the middle and the passengers on the sides behind the driver. It features a four-wheel-drive hybrid electric powertrain of the Lexus RX 400h which combines a 3.3 L V6 3MZ-FE petrol engine with two electric motors, one on each axle. The combination develops a maximum output of 300 kW (402 bhp), which enables the car to accelerate from 0 to 100 km/h (0 to 62 mph) in 4.03 seconds and reach the top speed of 250 km/h (155 mph). It uses drive-by-wire controls.

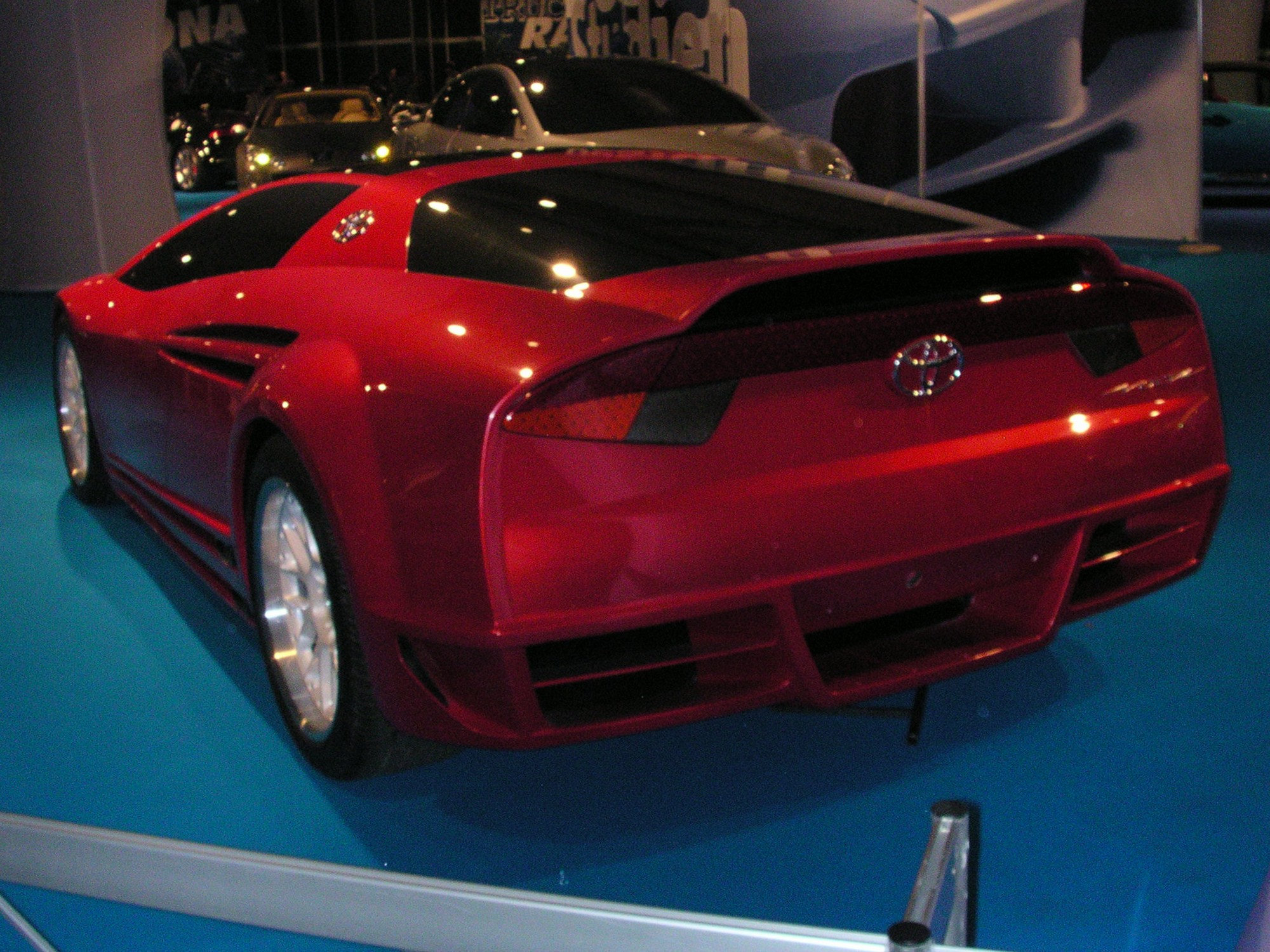
Alessandro Volta rear view

== i-foot (2004) ==
The Toyota i-foot is a personal walking robot for disabled people, made in 2004. It is driven with a joystick, and can reach speeds of only 1.35 km/h. The car is able to lower its egg-shaped capsule up and down, as well as raising the head rest.

== Motor Triathlon Race Car (2004) ==
Toyota Motor Triathlon Race Car
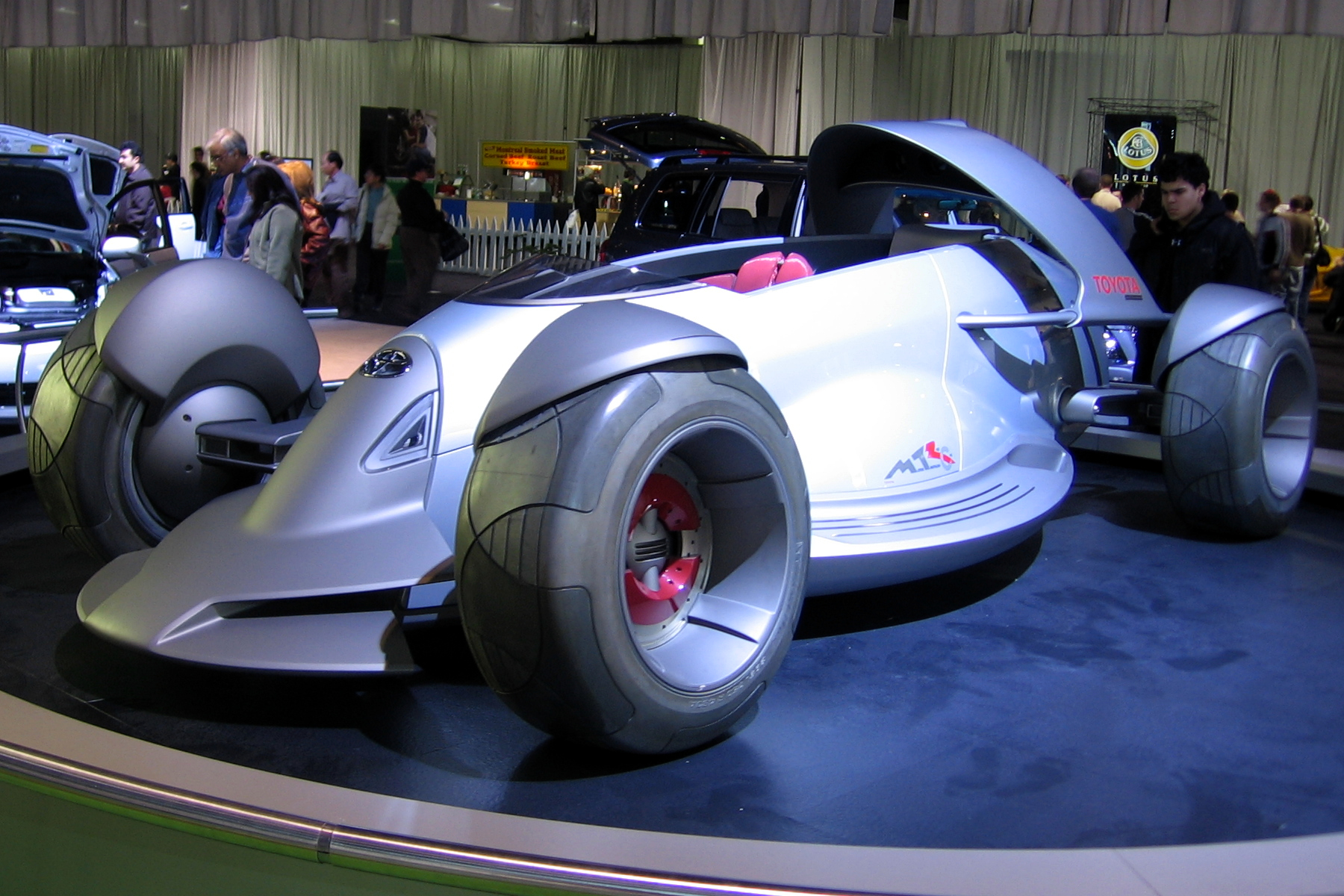

Overview
- Manufacturer: Toyota
- Production: 2004

Body and chassis
- Layout: 4WD with wheel hub motors

Dimensions
- Wheelbase: 2,950 mm (116.1 in)
- Length: 4,060 mm (159.8 in)
- Width: 1,930 mm (76.0 in)
- Height: 1,330–1,480 mm (52.4–58.3 in)

The Motor Triathlon Race Car (MTRC) is a two-seater fuel cell concept vehicle designed and built by the Toyota European Design and Development studio. It made its world premier at the March 2004 Geneva Motor Show, and its US debut at the April 2004 New York International Auto Show.

The MTRC is a response to the youth's cultural interests, such as mobile phones, video games, computers and internet play.

Power is provided by Toyota's hydrogen fuel cells. These provide electricity to four wheel hub motors. Each wheel also features electronically controlled suspension and sensors, allowing each wheel to maximise grip and to use the correct amount of torque for the current road conditions. The open cockpit requires the driver to wear a helmet - which has an internal head-up display.

The MTRC is available in the videogame Gran Turismo 4; a special demo version based on Gran Turismo 4 Prologue, which also featured the then-recent Toyota Prius, provided a simulation of the head-up display system, which was not included in the final game.

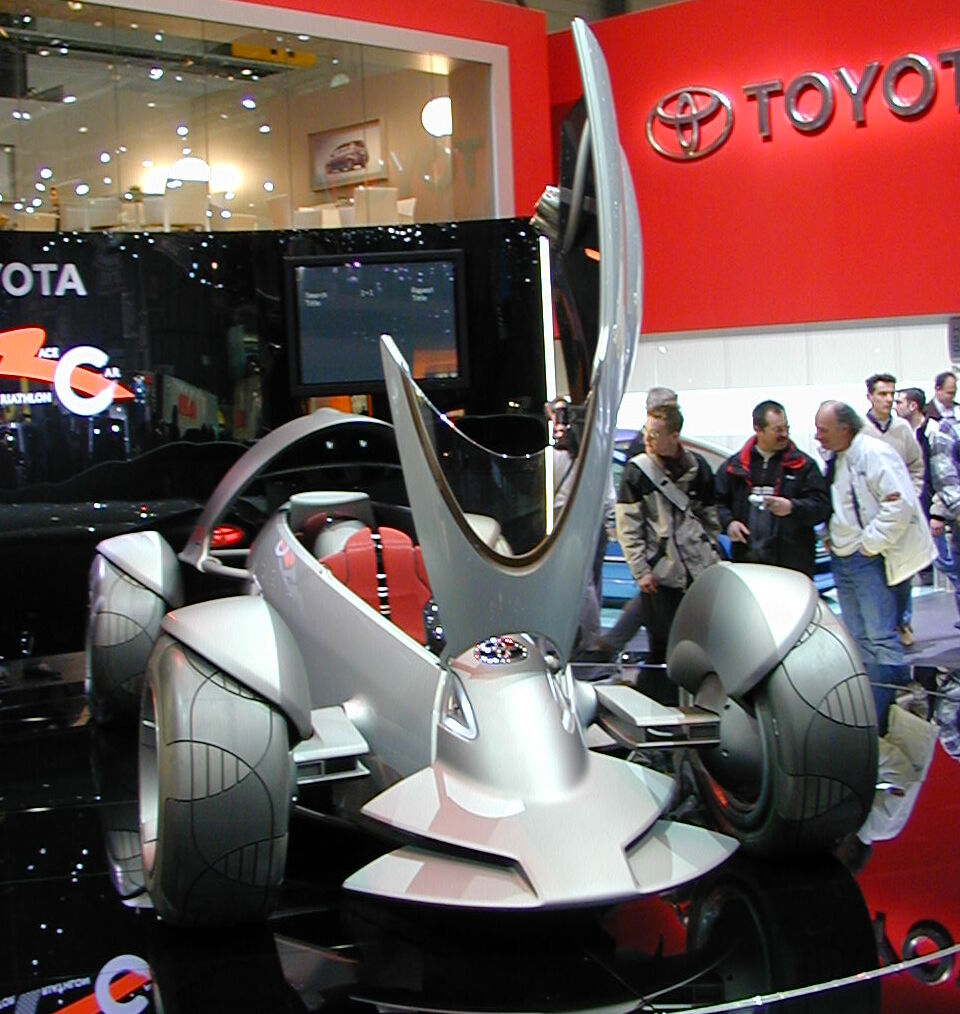
MTRC at the 2004 Geneva Motor Show.

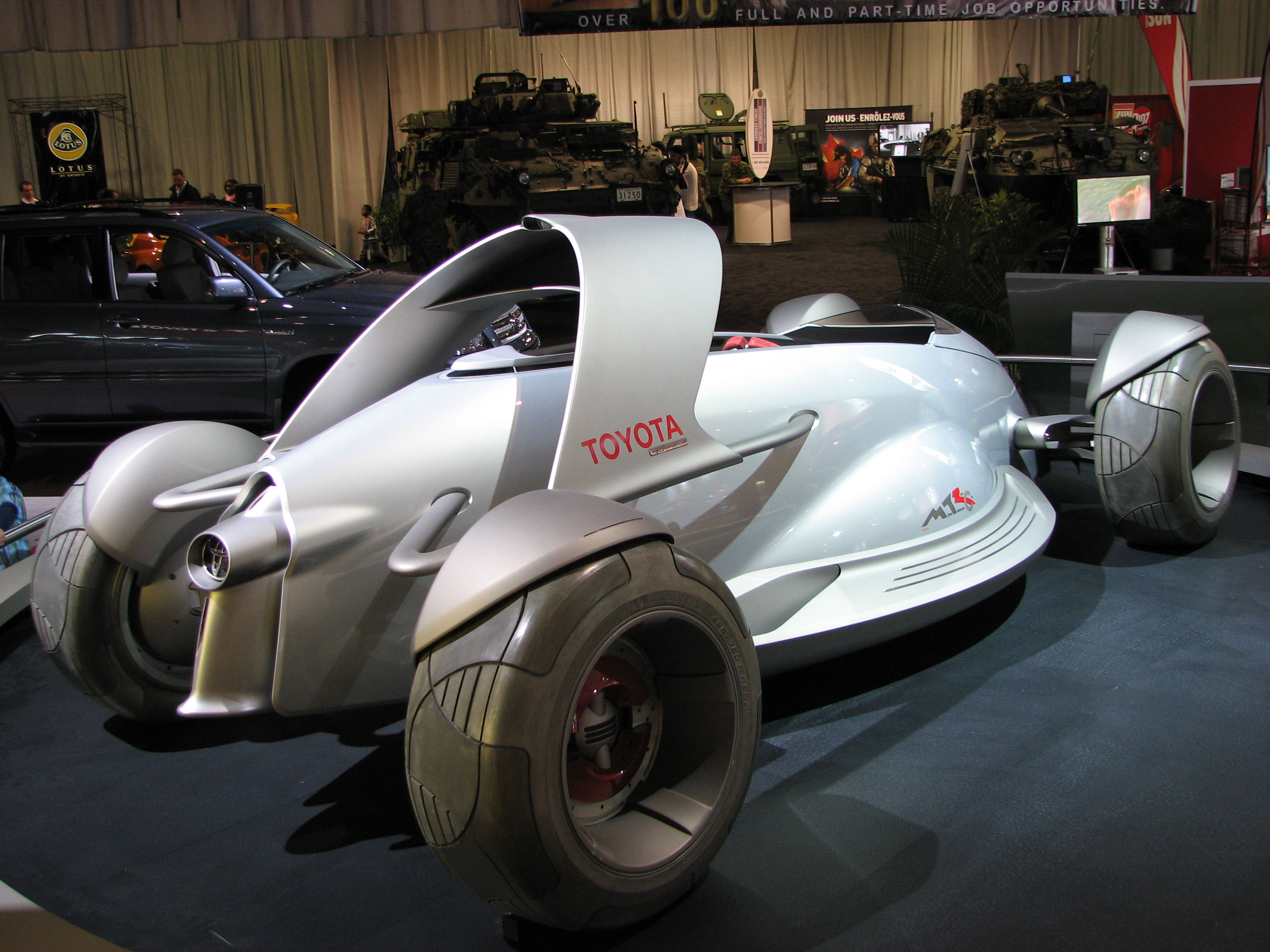
MTRC at the 2007 Canadian International AutoShow

== FTX (2004) ==
Toyota FTX

Overview
- Manufacturer: Toyota
- Production: 2004

Body and chassis
- Body style: Pickup truck
- Related: Tundra

Chronology
- Successor: Toyota Tundra second generation

The FTX is a concept full-size pickup truck that Toyota showed to the public at the January 2004 North American International Auto Show. The redesigned 2007 model year Tundra was based on the FTX concept vehicle.

== D-4D 180 Clean Power Concept Car (2004) ==
Toyota D-4D 180 Clean Power Concept Car

Overview
- Manufacturer: Toyota
- Production: 2004

Body and chassis
- Class: Midsize car
- Body style: 4-door Sedan

Powertrain
- Engine: D-4D diesel

Chronology
- Predecessor: Toyota Camry Hybrid

The Toyota D-4D 180 Clean Power Concept Car, or Toyota D-4D for short, is a clean concept car, using the new D-4D diesel engine. It is based on the Toyota Camry Hybrid, and came out in 2004. It was designed and made in Paris.

== Camry TS-01 (2005) ==
Toyota Camry TS-01
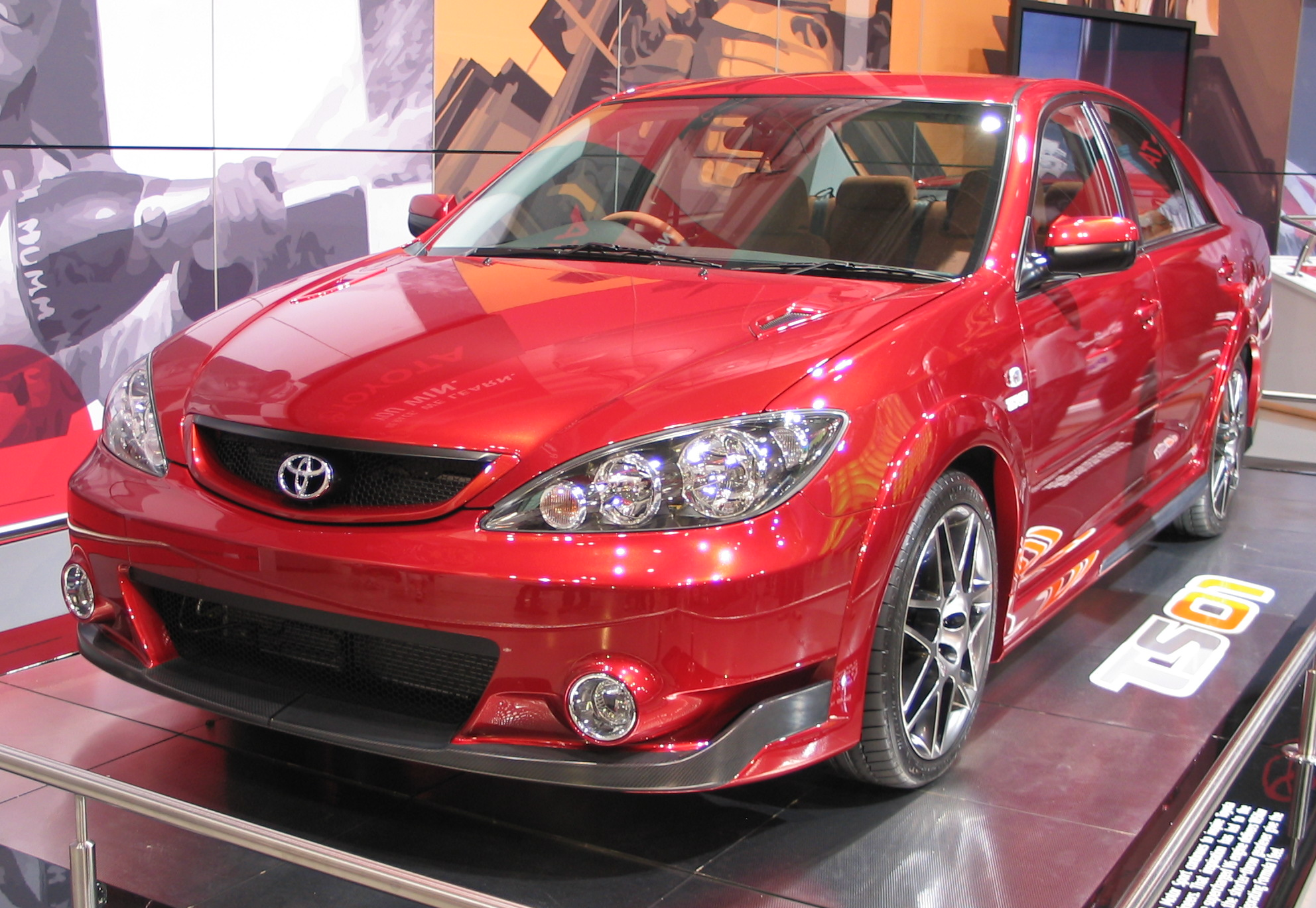

Overview
- Manufacturer: Toyota Australia
- Production: 2005
- Designer: Toyota Style Australia

Body and chassis
- Class: Mid-size
- Body style: 4-door sedan
- Layout: FF
- Related: Camry

Powertrain
- Engine: 3.0 L 1MZ-FE V6 supercharged
- Transmission: 5-speed manual

The Camry TS-01 is a concept car based on the Camry (MCV30) that was unveiled at the March 2005 Melbourne International Motor Show in Australia. The aim of the Camry TS-01 was to showcase the skill of Toyota Australia's designers and engineers. The concept car was named the TS-01 after Toyota's F1 drivers Jarno Trulli and Ralf Schumacher. The Camry TS-01 was also a precursor to the launch of TRD Australia, to create performance enhanced versions of Toyota vehicles, similar to FPV (Ford), Ralliart (Mitsubishi) and HSV (Holden).

Its major features are the stylistic changes and the supercharged 1MZ-FE engine making 185 kW (248 hp) and 320 N⋅m (236 lbf⋅ft), 28 and 12% higher respectively than the power and torque figures of the production Camry. The supercharger was by TRD, while the ECU was remapped by Australian engineers in Japan. The car has a 5-speed manual transmission, together with a heavy duty clutch adapted from the Toyota Team Racing rally Corolla.

The suspension and brakes were extensively tuned. The ride height was reduced to the minimum ADR permitted height while the front brakes were enlarged from 280 mm (11.0 in) to 325 mm (12.8 in) diameter, two-pot calipers. Changes were also made to the brake booster calibration, brake bias, and pedal ratio.

The external and interior design were done by Toyota Style Australia, led by Paul Beranger. Exterior styling changes which include unique 14-spoke alloy wheels wrapped with Michelin Pilot Sport tires, wheel flares, unique side skirts, a unique front bumper with integrated round fog lights, a unique rear bumper with dual exhaust tips, an F1 inspired rear spoiler with a center mounted rear brake light, modified side door mirrors, and a revised grille and hood. All body parts were sourced locally in Australia. The interior featured a dark tan suede interior trim, while the driver's seat was modified to provide additional support around the hips and shoulders. Carbon fiber surfaces were substantially used in the cabin and Optitron gauges replaced the instrumentation of the production Camry.

== Endo (2005) ==
Toyota Endo

Overview
- Manufacturer: Toyota
- Production: 2005

Dimensions
- Length: 3,000 mm (118.1 in)
- Width: 1,690 mm (66.5 in)
- Height: 1,520 mm (59.8 in)

The Toyota Endo is a concept car designed by the Toyota ED² studio in France. It was presented in 2005. It can seat 4 passengers and luggage. It was displayed at the Frankfurt Motor Show of this urban-friendly car. The car is meant to overcome typical city problems-shortage of space, emissions and traffic congestion. The Endo is only 3 m long, 1.52 m tall, and 1.69 m wide. The rear seats can be rotated in several different directions.

== Fine-X, Fine-T (2005) ==
Toyota Fine-X, Fine-T
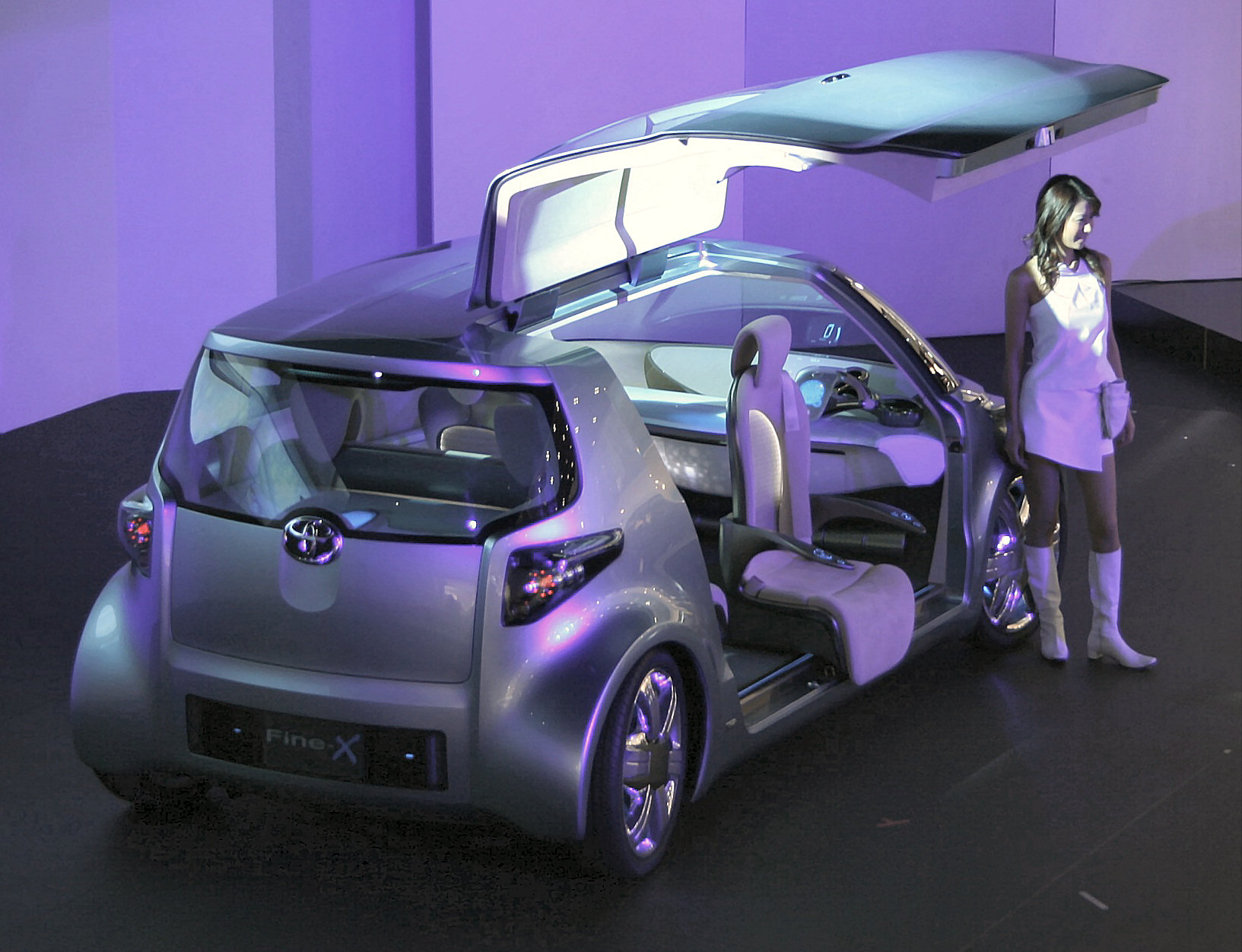

Overview
- Manufacturer: Toyota
- Production: 2005

Body and chassis
- Doors: Gull-wing doors

Dimensions
- Length: 3,860 mm (152.0 in)
- Width: 1,750 mm (68.9 in)
- Height: 1,550 mm (61.0 in)

Chronology
- Predecessor: Fine-N

The Fine-X (Fuel cell INnovation Emotion-eXperiment) was a concept vehicle that was shown at the October 2005 Tokyo Motor Show and the March 2006 Geneva Auto Show. In Japan and Europe it was called the Fine-T.

The Fine-X uses a fuel cell hybrid system which drives four independent motors - one in each wheel. It can make perfect U-turns and park very easily, thanks to its independent four-wheel steering. The Fine-X uses the latest IT/ITS peripheral-monitoring technology that allows the Fine-X to have much smoother driving.

The Fine-X uses gull-wing doors, which are said to make it easier to get in and out of the car, however cannot be opened in a rollover accident. The powered seats can rotate and shift sideways through the gull-wing door openings.

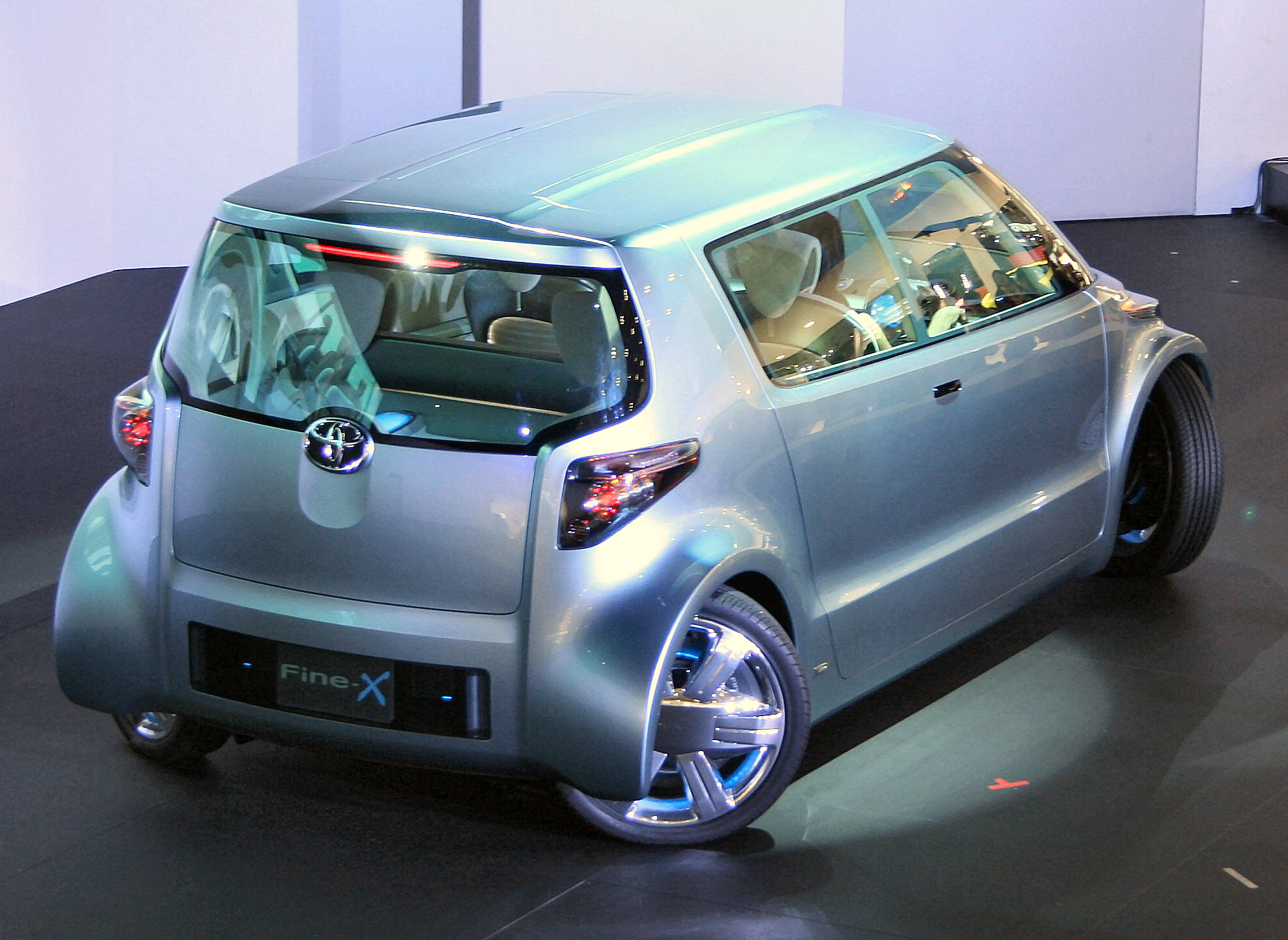
Fine-X showing four-wheel steering

== FSC (2005) ==
Toyota FSC
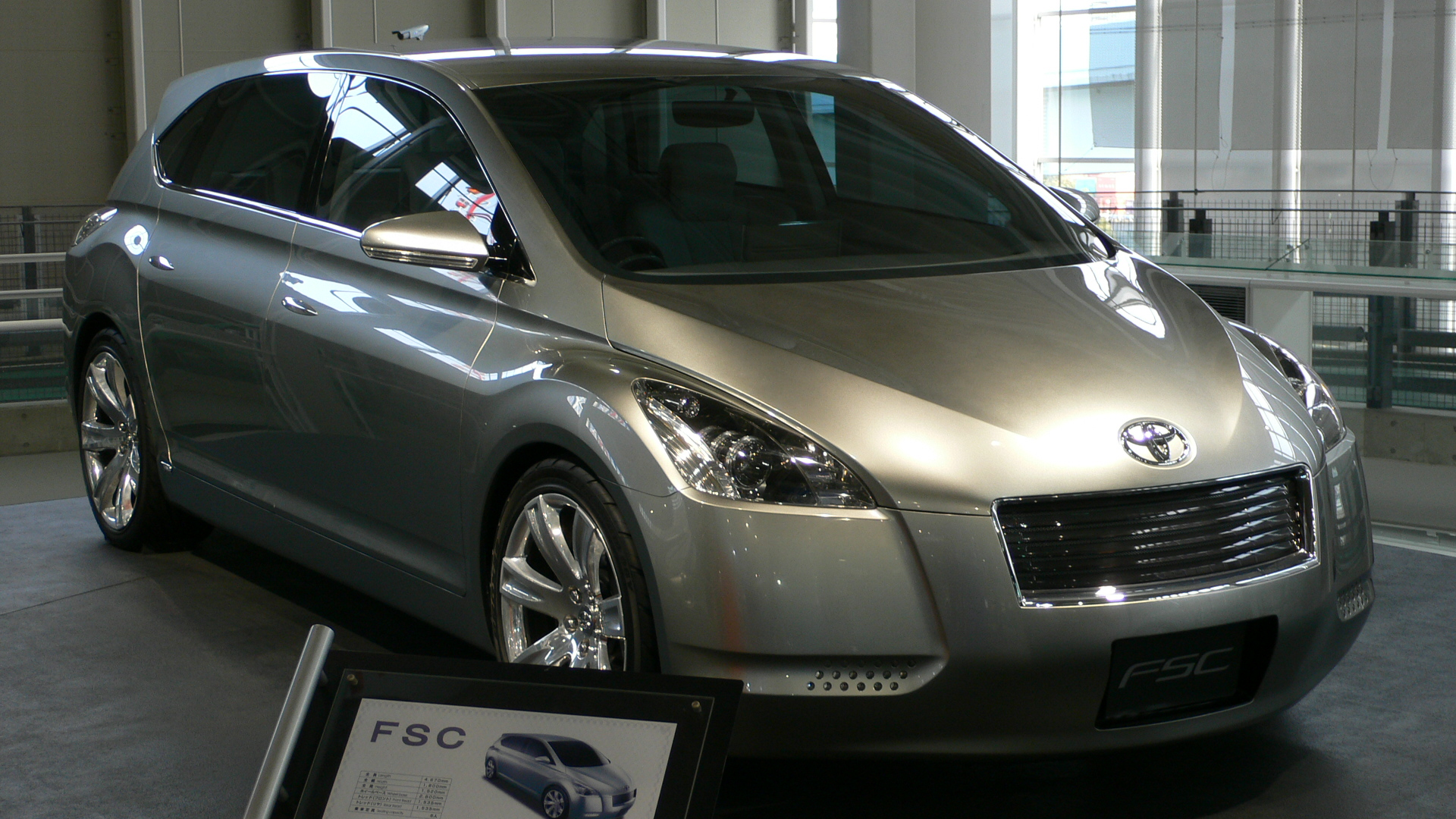

Overview
- Manufacturer: Toyota
- Production: 2005

Body and chassis
- Platform: Camry
- Related: Camry

Dimensions
- Length: 4,670 mm (183.9 in)

Chronology
- Successor: Toyota Mark X ZiO

The FSC (Flexible Saloon Concept) was a concept wagon based on the Camry that was first shown at the October 2005 Tokyo Motor Show. The first two rows had two bucket seats each. The third row bench seat could be set to hold two more passengers. The rear seat backrest could also be folded down to make a long deck at lower cushion height. Lastly, the rear seat backrest could be left upright and the lower cushions could be electrically retracted into the cargo area to make a deep cargo space.

The FSC was made into production in Japan only as the Mark X ZiO.

== i-swing (2005) ==
Toyota i-swing
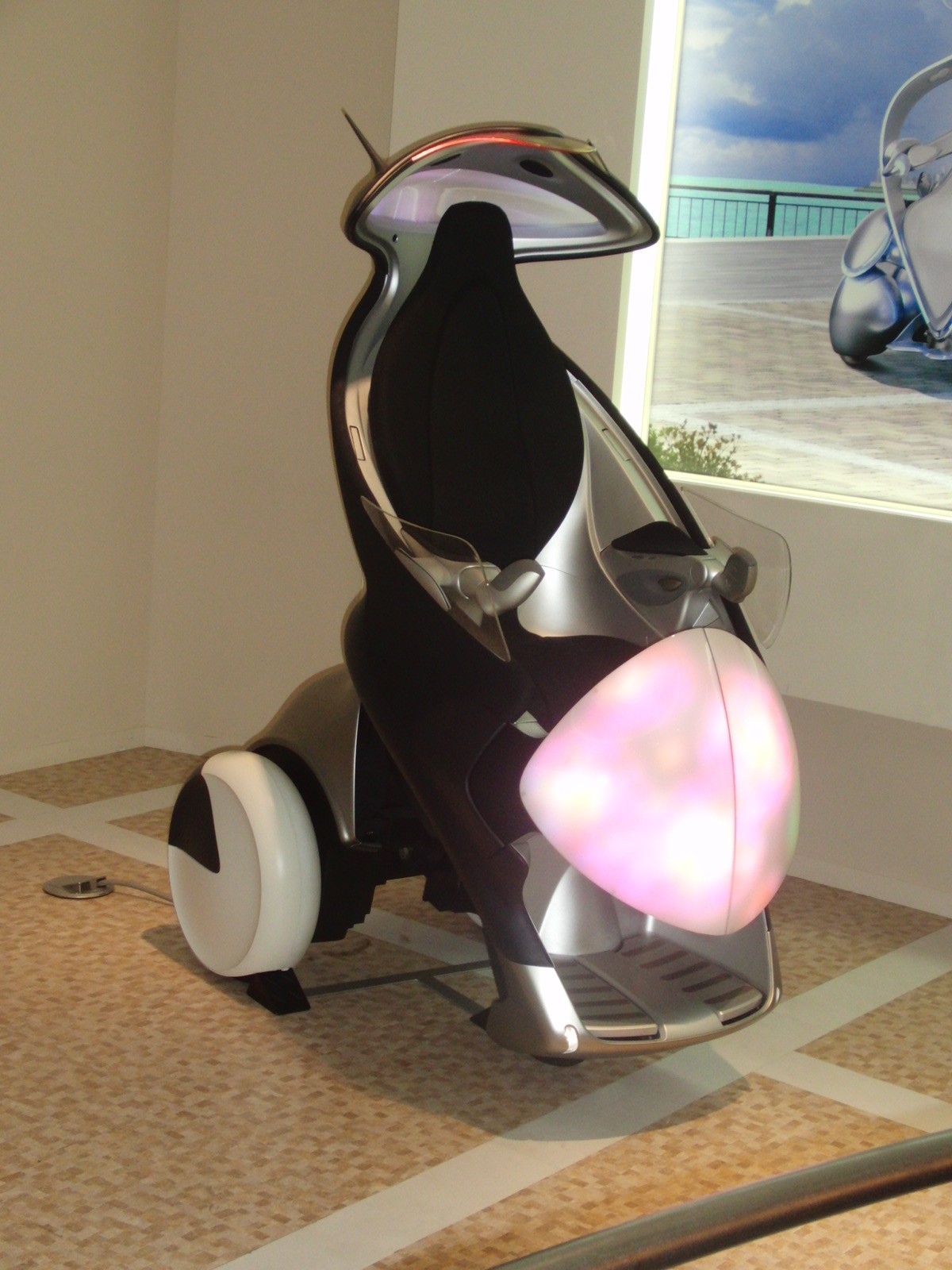
- The Toyota i-swing on display

Overview
- Manufacturer: Toyota
- Production: 2005

Body and chassis
- Class: robot

Dimensions
- Length: 995 mm
- Width: 700 mm
- Height: 1,430 mm

The Toyota i-swing is a robot to help people move. It was introduced in 2005. It can be comparable to the Toyota PM, Toyota i-unit, and the Toyota i-foot.

== Urban Cruiser Concept (2006) ==
Toyota Urban Cruiser Concept
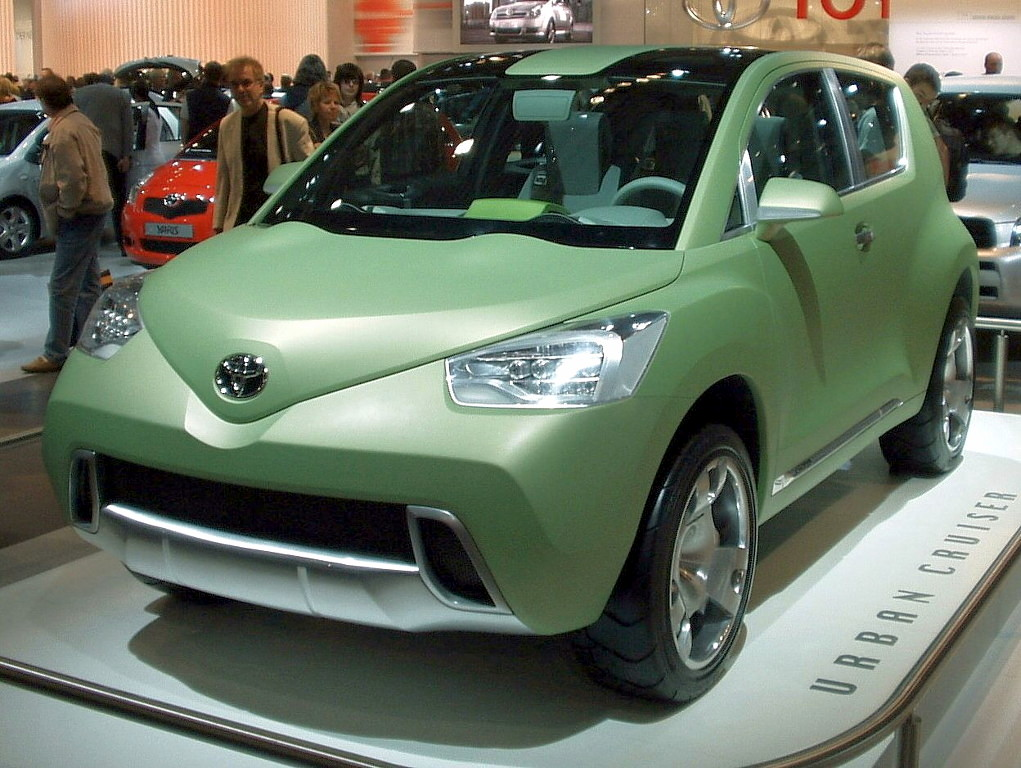

Overview
- Manufacturer: Toyota Motor Europe
- Production: 2006

Body and chassis
- Body style: Compact SUV

The Toyota Urban Cruiser Concept is a compact SUV concept car that was designed by the Toyota European Design Centre in Europe.

== Aurion Sports Concept (2006) ==
Toyota Aurion Sports Concept
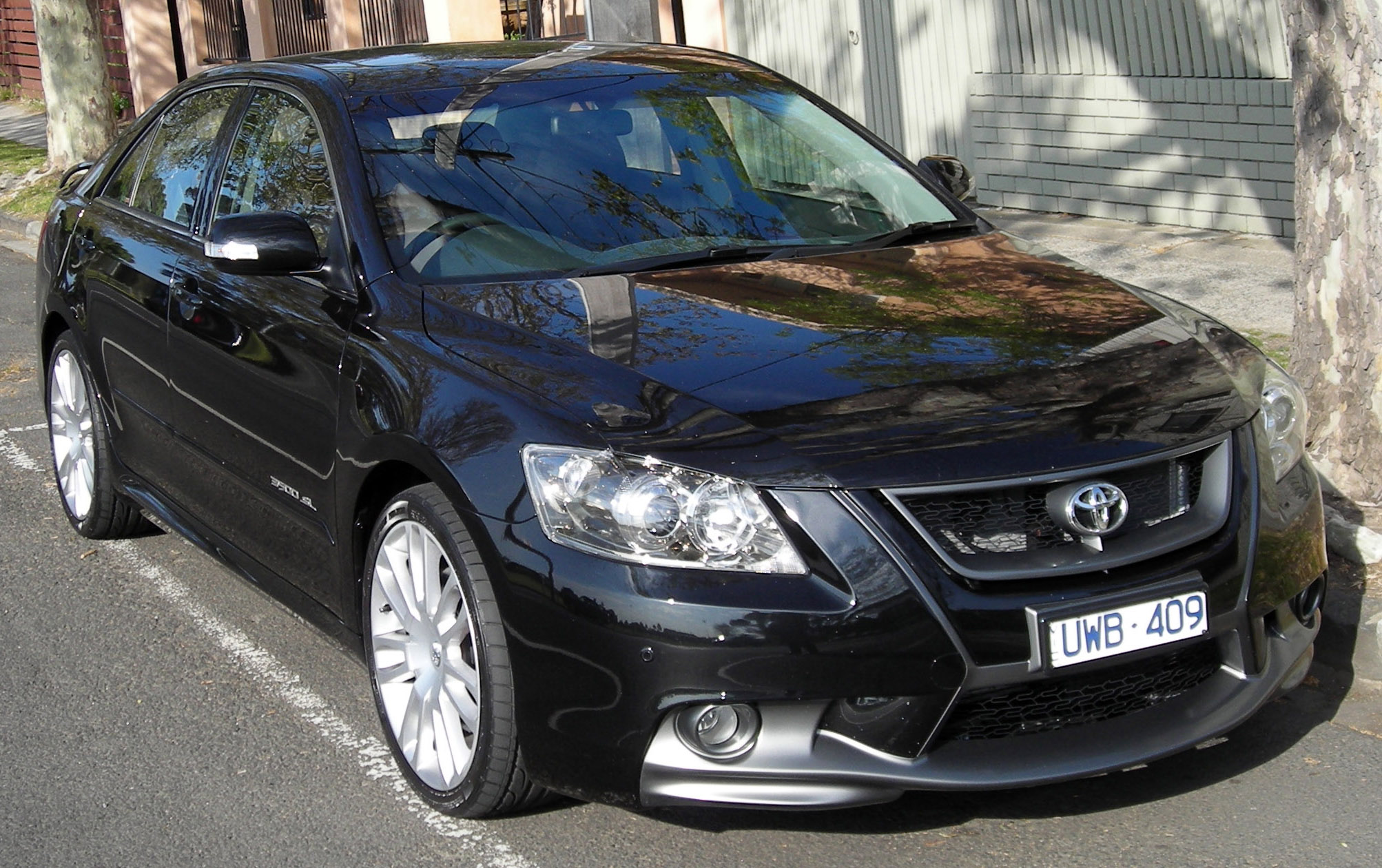

Overview
- Manufacturer: Toyota Australia
- Production: 2006
- Designer: Toyota Style Australia

Body and chassis
- Class: Mid-size
- Body style: 4-door sedan
- Layout: FF
- Related: Aurion, TRD Aurion, Camry

Powertrain
- Engine: 3.0 L 1MZ-FE V6 supercharged

Chronology
- Predecessor: Toyota Camry TS-01
- Successor: TRD Aurion

The Aurion Sports Concept was a concept car based on the Aurion (which was itself based on the Camry) and revealed at the October 2006 Australian International Motor Show. The car was a styling exercise previewing the TRD Aurion, which was subsequently released in August 2007.

== F3R (2006) ==
Toyota F3R
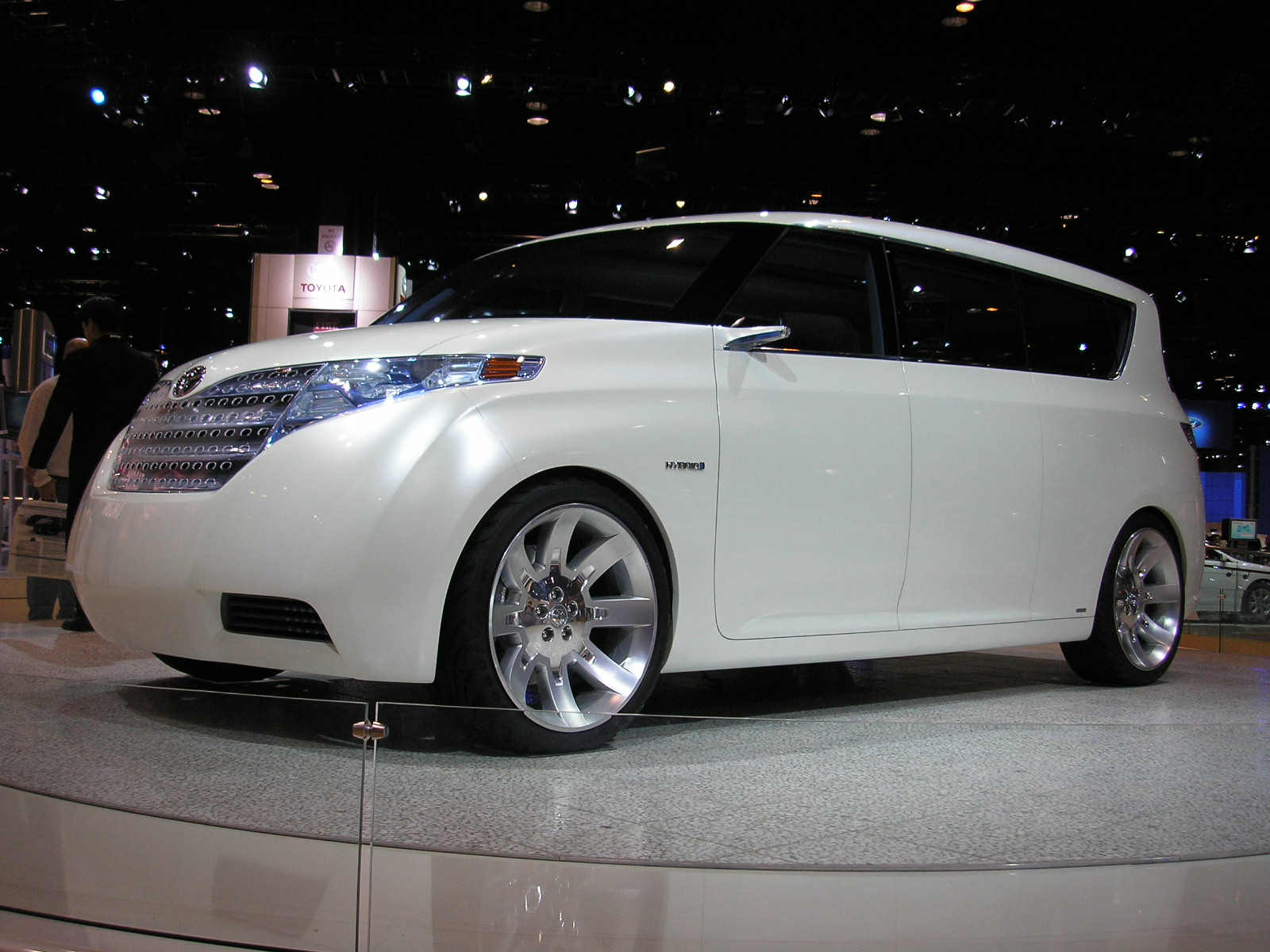

Overview
- Manufacturer: Toyota
- Production: 2006

Body and chassis
- Related: Toyota Sienna

Powertrain
- Engine: Hybrid

The Toyota F3R was a concept car by Toyota's Calty design facility that was introduced at the January 2006 North American International Auto Show. It is a hybrid powered minivan designed to have youthful appeal and escape the "soccer mom" stigma commonly associated with minivans.

The F3R has three rows of seats with three doors on either side. The front and middle doors open normally but the rear door opens in the opposite direction. There is no pillar between the middle and rear doors, so the openings are very large. The right and centre seats in middle row fold flat into the floor and the remaining left hand seat can be fully reclined to make a sideways-facing bench seat.

Exterior styling is similar to the Scion xB with 22 inch wheels.

== Hybrid X (2007) ==
Toyota Hybrid X
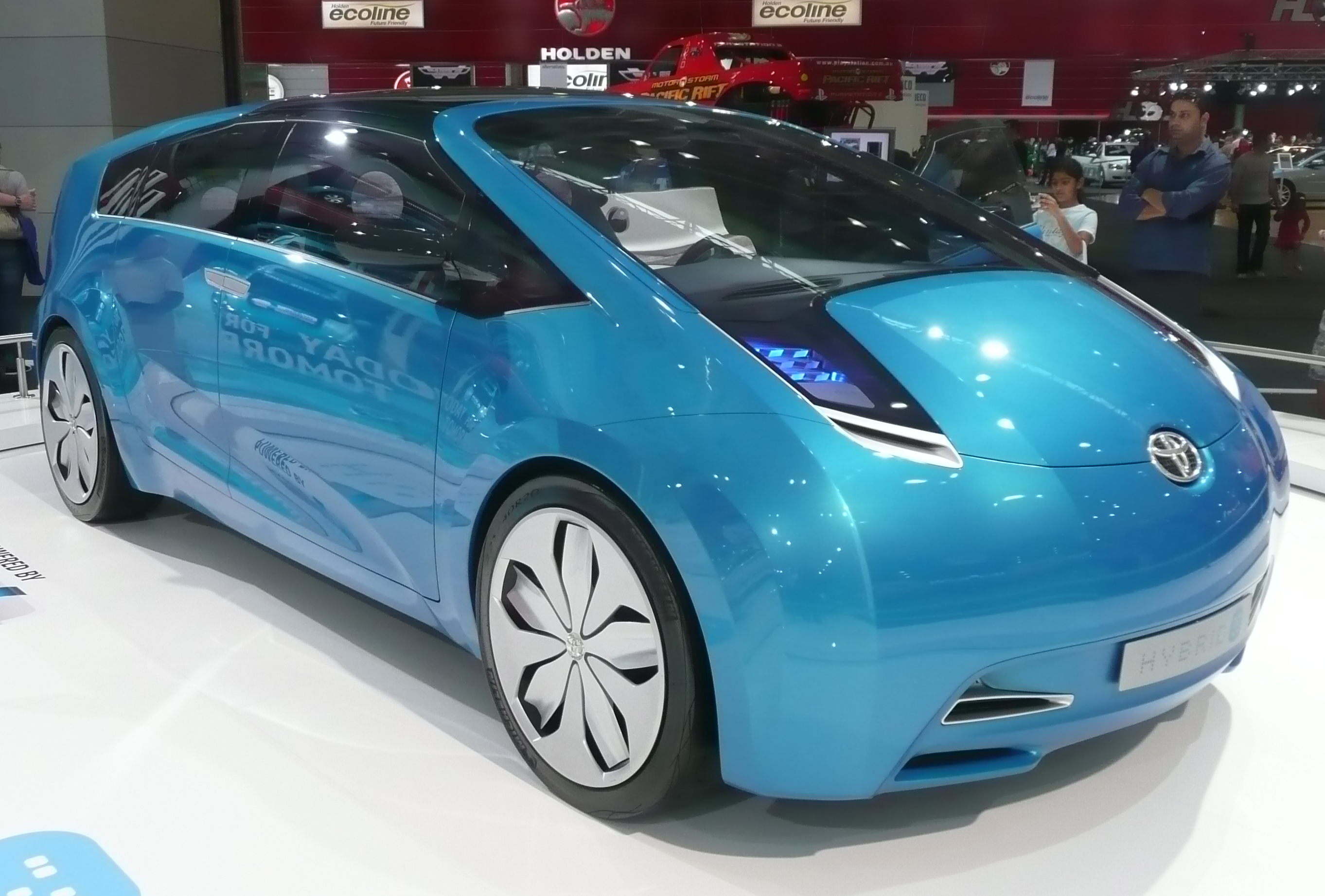

Overview
- Manufacturer: Toyota
- Production: 2007
- Designer: Laurent Bouzigue (interior)

Body and chassis
- Class: Mid-size car
- Body style: 5-door hatchback
- Layout: FF layout

Dimensions
- Wheelbase: 2,800 mm (110.2 in)
- Length: 4,500 mm (177.2 in)
- Width: 1,850 mm (72.8 in)
- Height: 1,440 mm (56.7 in)

The Toyota Hybrid X is a hybrid concept built by the Toyota ED² design studio in France and first shown at the March 2007 Geneva Motor Show. Toyota claims the design of this concept car points to the future direction of the Toyota Prius. The design of the Toyota Hybrid X is a 5-door hatchback with a fastback-like styling.

According to interior designer Laurent Bouzigue, the Hybrid X is supposed to be a very sensory experience, and the ambiance is linked to the passengers' sight, sound, touch, and smell senses. Interior surfaces have a variety of light effects, textures and even fragrance from a perfume diffuser. The drive-by-wire steering pad has a touch screen and there is another screen in the centre of the dashboard to show vehicle information and to set minor controls. The rear seats can each be turned 12 degrees left or right to help passengers look inwards or outwards.

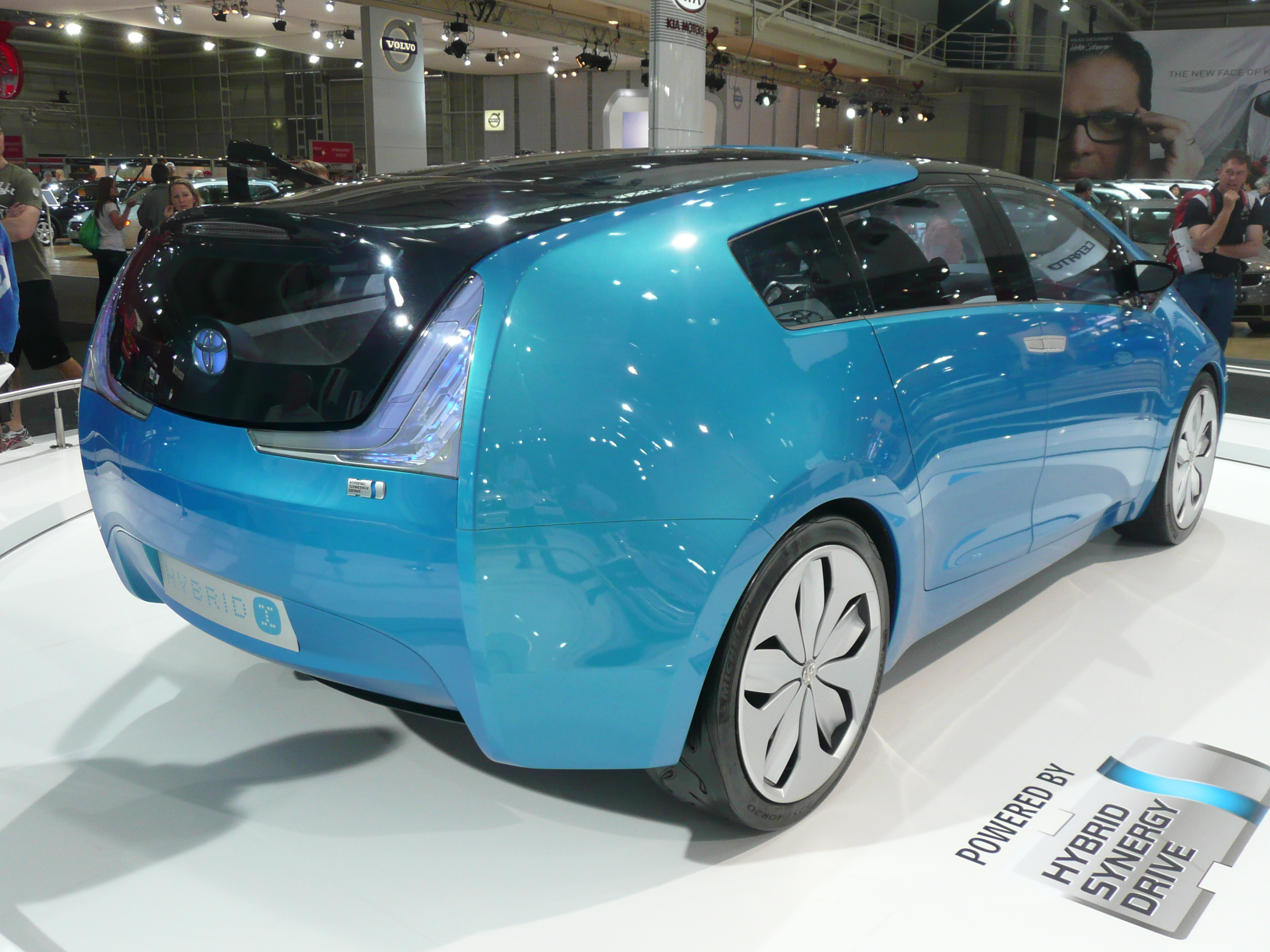
Rear

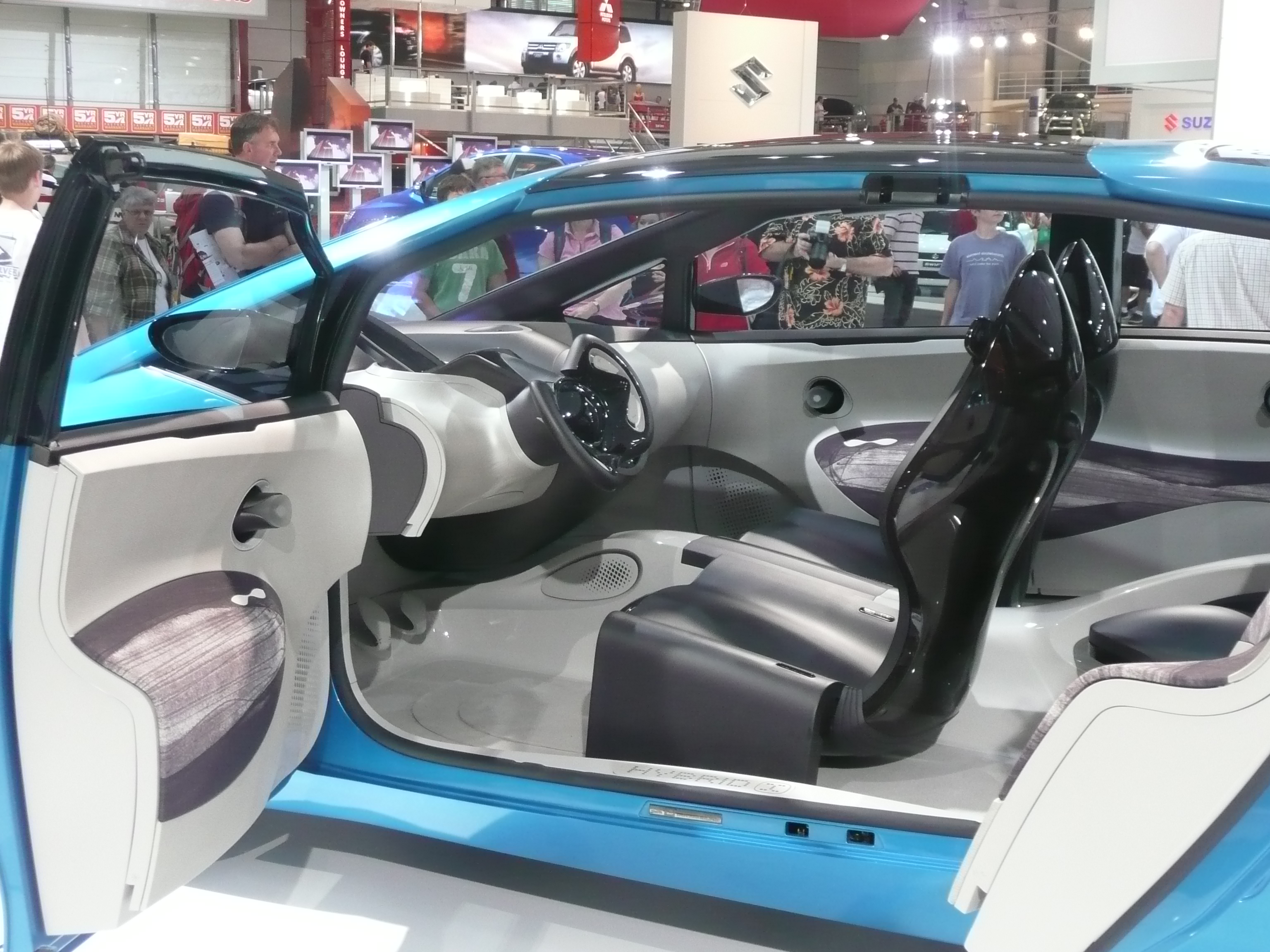
Interior

== Hi-CT (2007) ==
Toyota Hi-CT
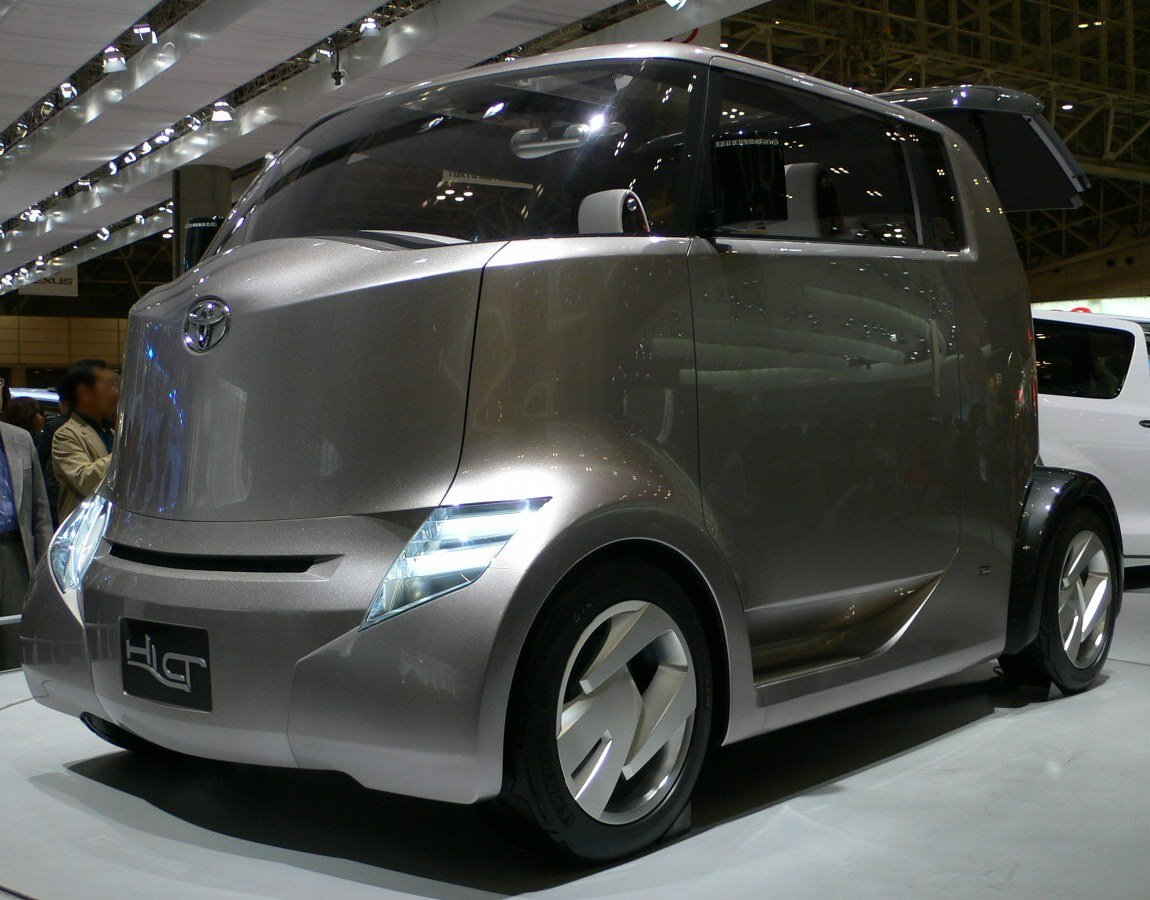
- Hi-CT at the 2007 Tokyo Motor Show

Overview
- Manufacturer: Toyota
- Production: 2007

Dimensions
- Length: 3,330 mm (131.1 in)
- Width: 1,695 mm (66.7 in)
- Height: 1,780 mm (70.1 in)

The Toyota Hi-CT (Hi ride City Truck) is a two-seat concept car built by Toyota and first shown at the October 2007 Tokyo Motor Show.

Motive power is by a plug-in hybrid with batteries under the floor. A 100-volt AC socket is provided to power accessories.

The rear seats can be rotated to look backwards through the rear hatch. The boot is a removable module which can be replaced with other modules. If no module is used then the small cargo deck can be used to carry items such as surfboards. The rear hatch can not be opened when the rear deck is in use or if a module is in place.

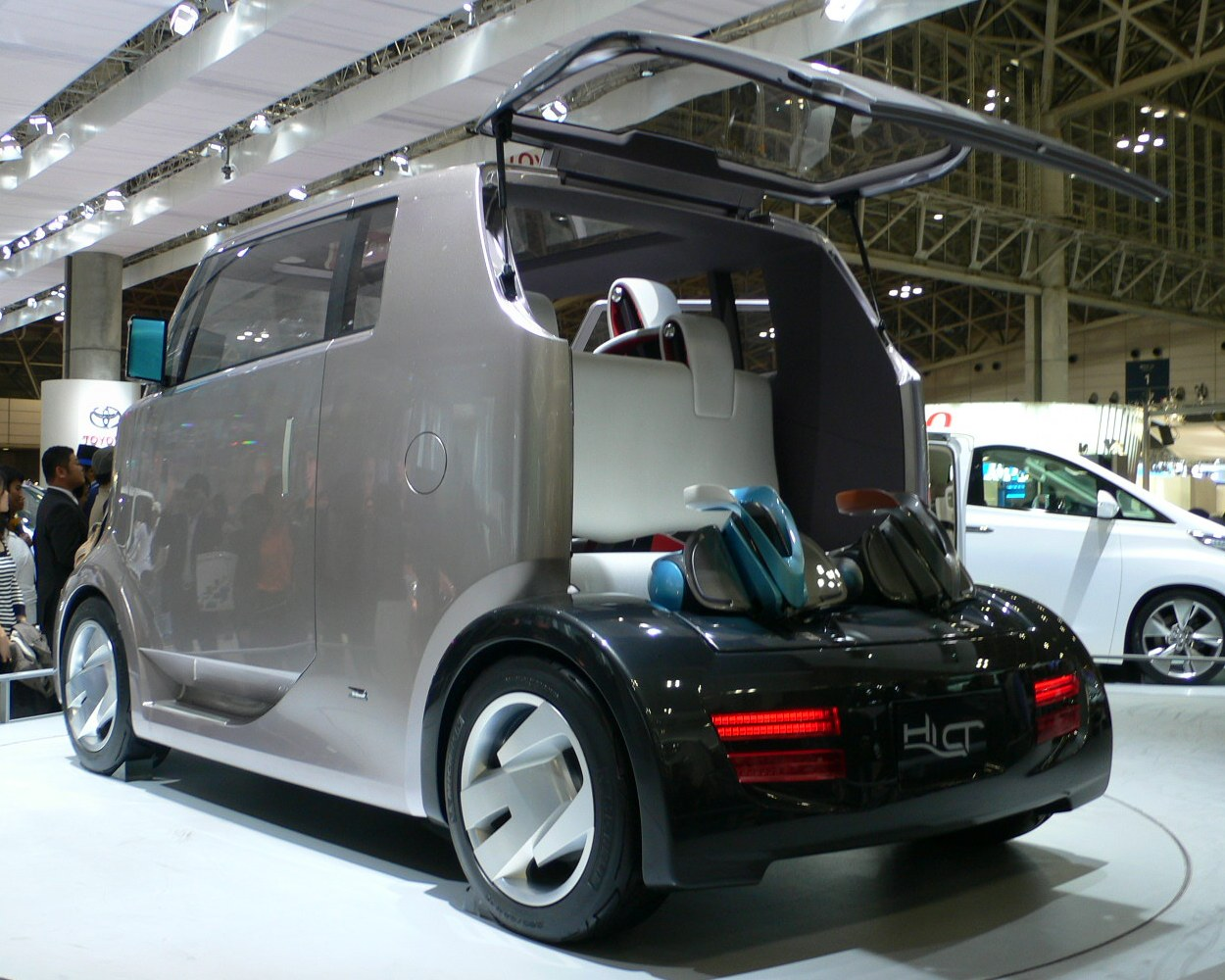
Hi-CT at the 2007 Tokyo Motor Show

== RiN (2007) ==
Toyota RiN
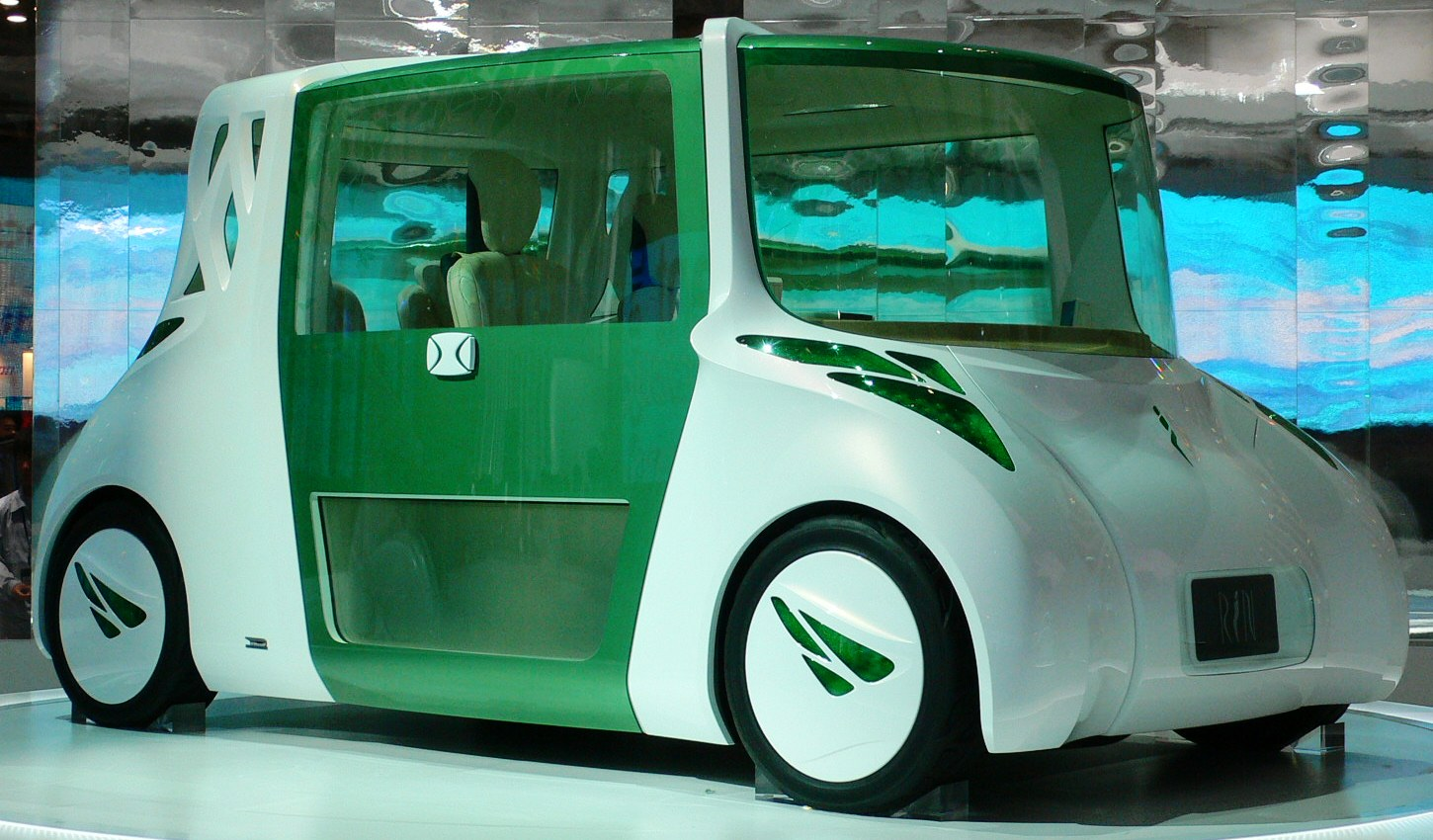

Overview
- Manufacturer: Toyota
- Production: 2007

The Toyota RiN is a concept car built by Toyota and first shown at the October 2007 Tokyo Motor Show. The vehicle was designed to promote relaxation and healthiness. It has received much media attention for its odd design and its steering wheel, which changes colour depending on the driver's mood.

The concept features four seats accessed by two large sliding doors, and windows made of green glass, designed to reduce ultraviolet and infra-red light. "The concept, which looks like some sort of futuristic stagecoach, is designed to help its driver become one with nature". The car features a pinpoint humidifier, and an oxygen-level conditioner. It was reported that the car was inspired by a milkfloat.

A Toyota press release stated that "the RiN focuses on increased comfort and serene, healthy living. Through their relationship to the vehicle, drivers are encouraged to reevaluate themselves and, furthermore, to turn their attention to society and nature, producing a healthy rhythm for both mind and body." Toyota says the car "creates a feeling of harmony with the surrounding environment by using sliding doors with a low window that lets you view nature at ground level, as well as headlights with light distribution control that take into consideration pedestrians and vehicles coming in the opposite direction."

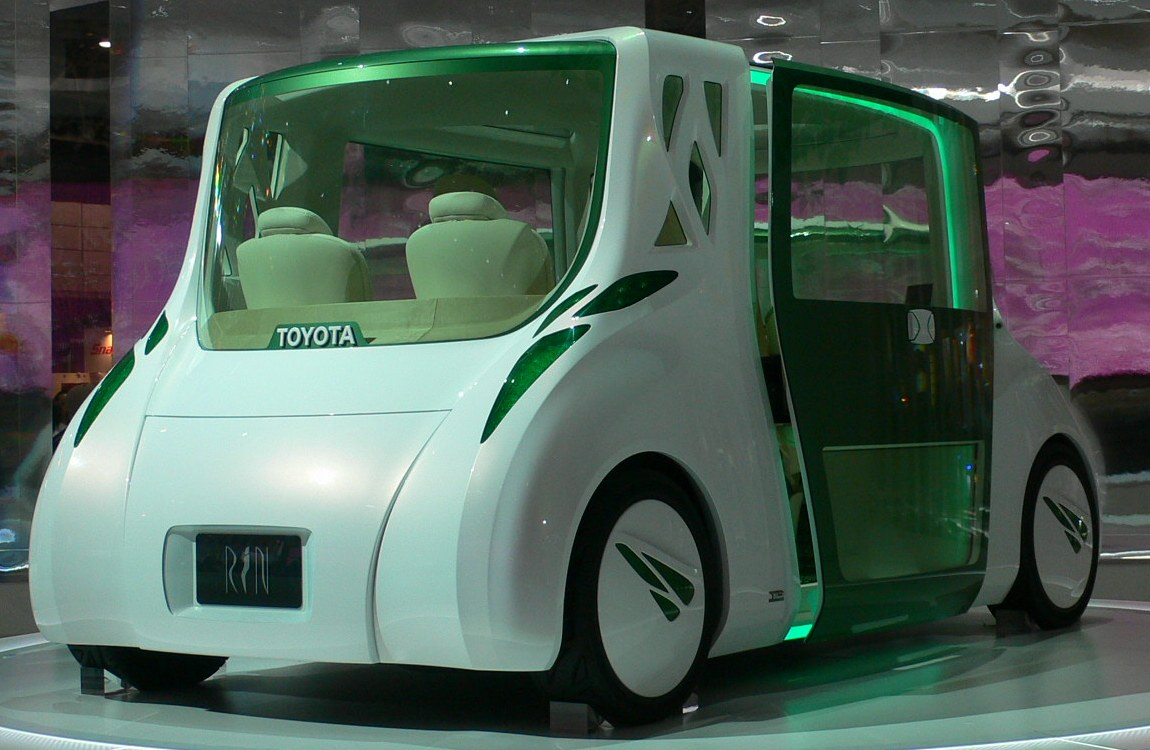
Toyota RiN at the 2007 Tokyo Motor Show

== 1/X (2007) ==
Toyota 1/X
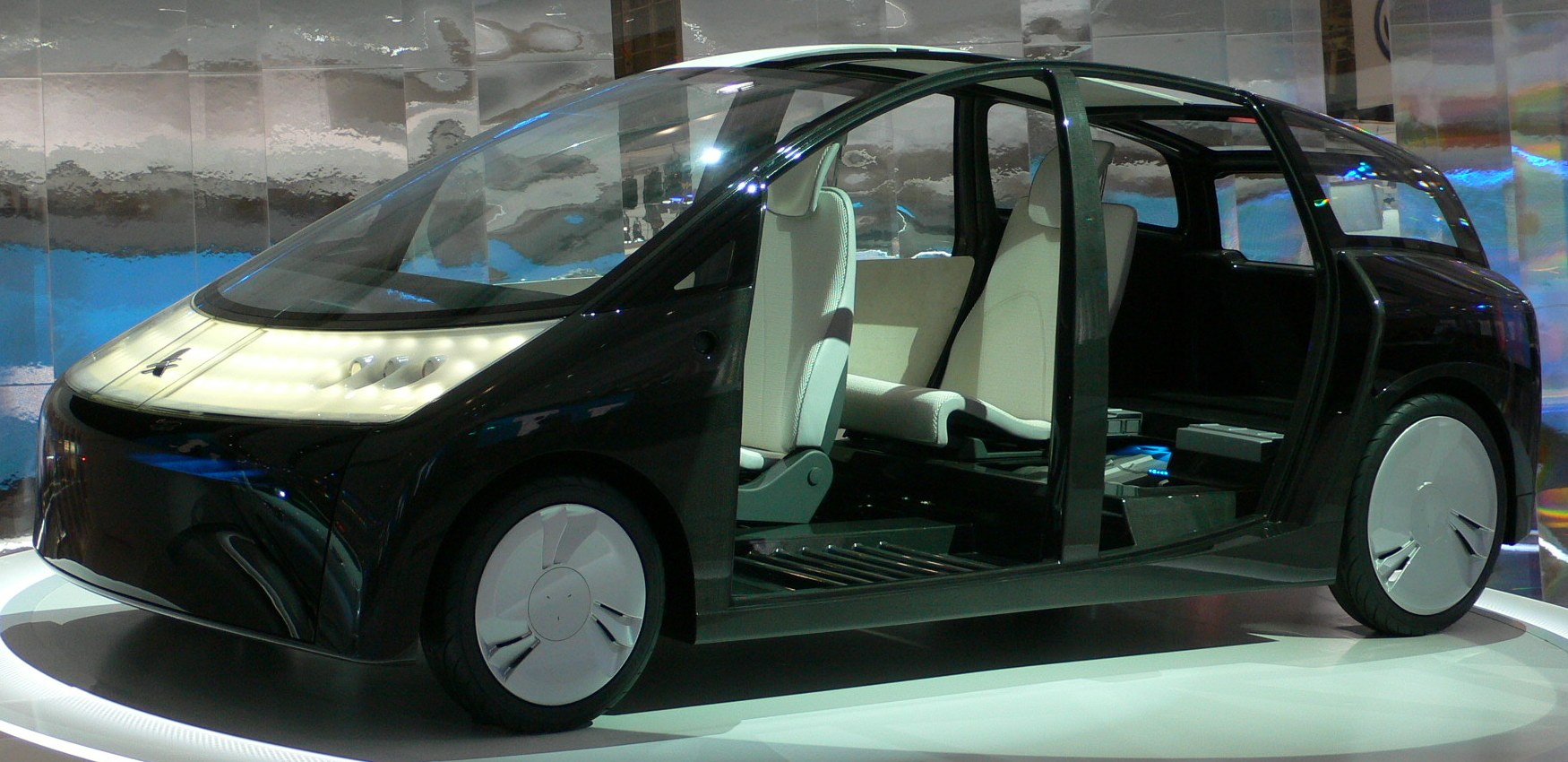

Overview
- Manufacturer: Toyota
- Production: 2007

Powertrain
- Engine: 500cc with electric motor

The Toyota 1/X (pronounced as "one-Xth", /wʌnˈɛksθ/) is a concept car built by Toyota and first shown at the October 2007 Tokyo Motor Show. It is a petrol-electric hybrid vehicle utilizing plug-in technology. The car weighs only 926 lb (420 kg) but has as much interior room as the Toyota Prius. The car's frame is mainly carbon-fiber reinforced plastic, which allows it to be lightweight yet strong. The engine is 500 cc and sits under the rear two of four seats, driving the rear wheels.

Toyota envisions the car to be made of seaweed in the future.

== FT-HS (2007) ==
Toyota FT-HS
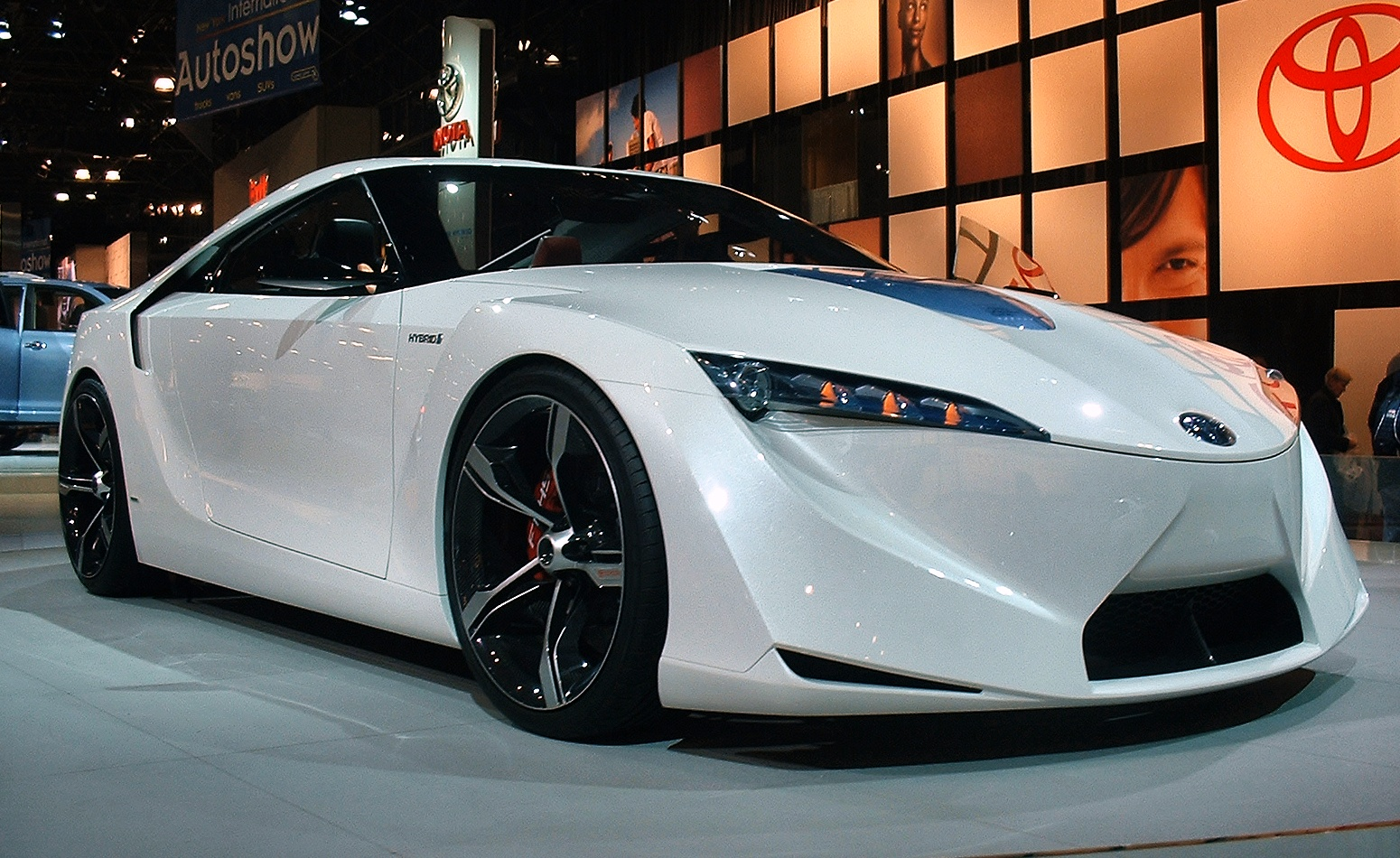

Overview
- Manufacturer: Toyota
- Production: 2007

Body and chassis
- Body style: 2+2 coupe
- Layout: Front-engine, RWD

Powertrain
- Engine: 3.5 L V6 hybrid electric

Dimensions
- Wheelbase: 2,650 mm (104.33 in)
- Length: 4,325 mm (170.27 in)
- Width: 1,860 mm (73.23 in)
- Height: 1,290 mm (50.79 in)

Chronology
- Predecessor: Toyota Supra

The Toyota FT-HS is a hybrid sports car concept introduced at the January 2007 North American International Auto Show. Calty Design Research designed the concept and would later fill the place of the Toyota Supra. FT-HS stands for Future Toyota Hybrid Sport.

== A-BAT (2007) ==
Toyota A-BAT
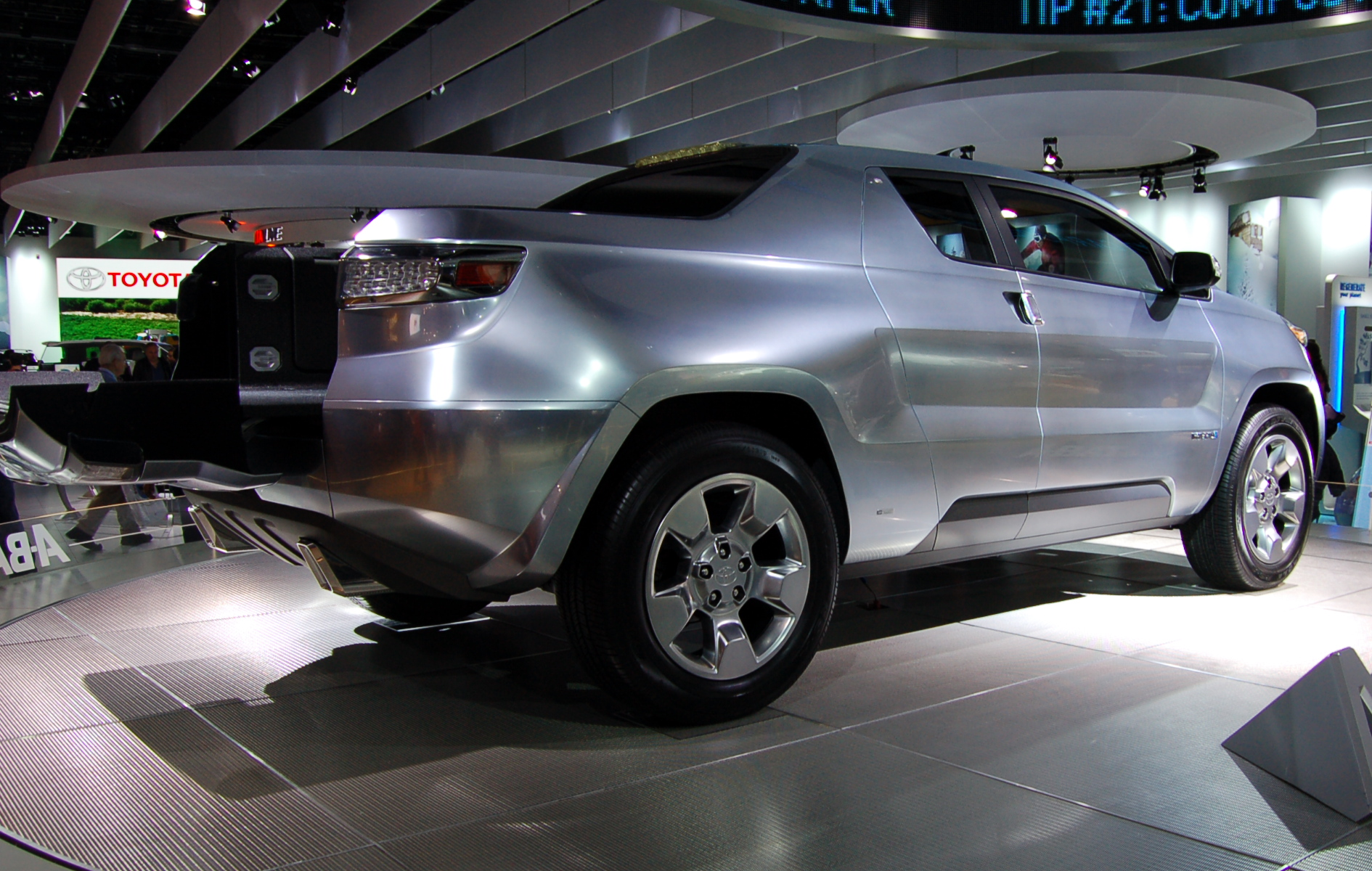

Overview
- Manufacturer: Toyota
- Production: 2007
- Designer: Calty

Body and chassis
- Class: Compact pick-up
- Body style: 4-door extended cab
- Layout: Front-engine, all-wheel-drive

Dimensions
- Length: 4,605 mm (181.3 in)

The A-BAT is a concept truck revealed on 27 December 2007 and manufactured by Toyota. The A-BAT is the first Toyota to have a mid-gate allowing cargo longer than the standard four-foot bed to extend into the cab (like a Chevrolet Avalanche or Honda Ridgeline). Power for the A-BAT comes from Toyota's Hybrid Synergy Drive mated to a four-cylinder engine. The A-BAT officially debuted at the January 2008 North American International Auto Show in Detroit.

The concept truck is similar in size to Toyota's compact SUV, the RAV4. The A-BAT measures 181.3 inches in length, while the RAV4 measures 181.1 inches. It can also seat up to four people.

On 22 September 2008, the website PickupTrucks.com indicated that Toyota had confirmed that some form of the Toyota A-BAT would see production, barring unforeseen production costs. The article also stated that Toyota had cancelled production of a Tundra diesel truck. Although Toyota later denied official confirmation of the Tundra's cancellation, no mention was made denying the statement regarding the A-BAT. Sources say that a production version of the concept will likely have a four-cylinder engine as an option, as well as a four-cylinder hybrid engine.

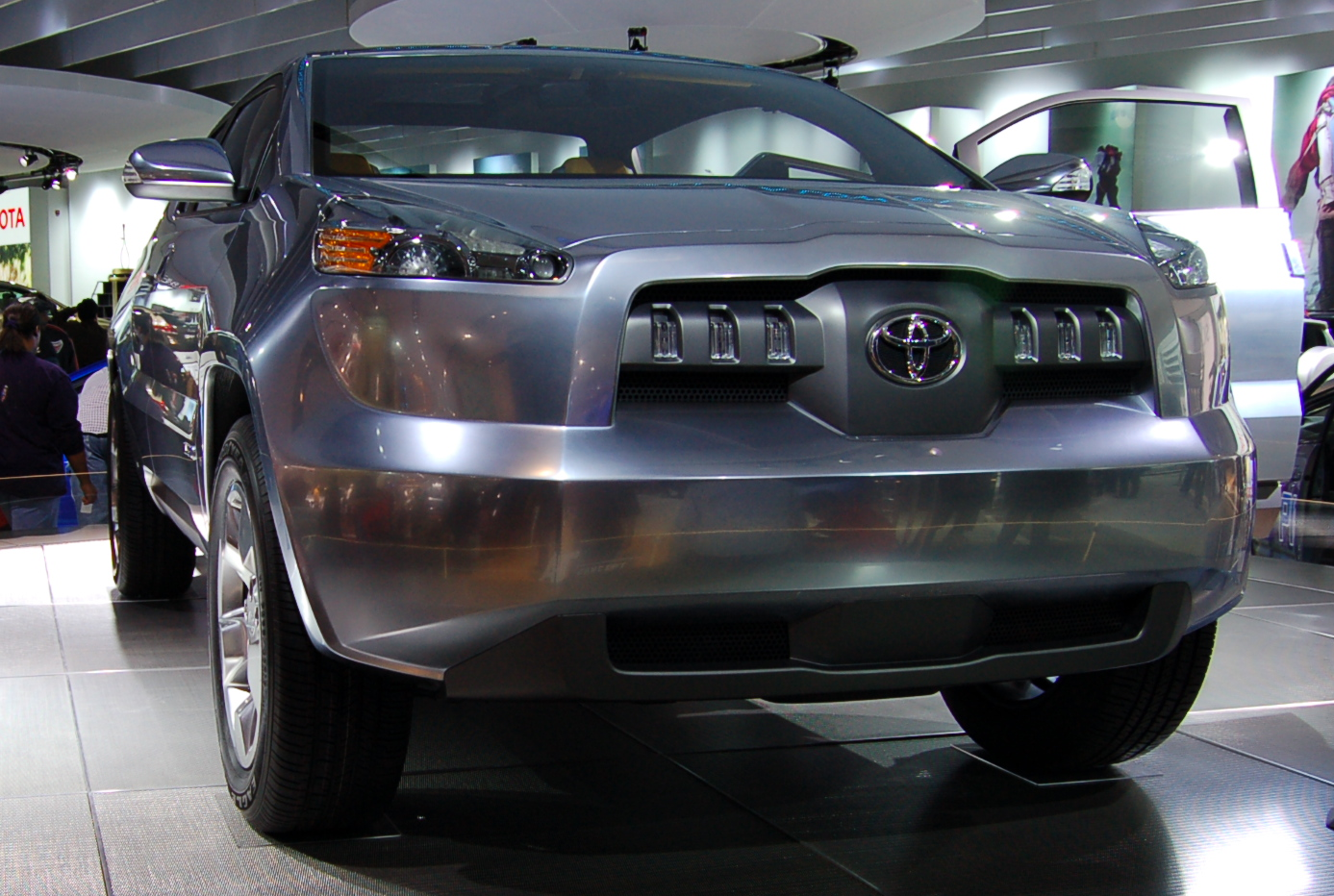
Front

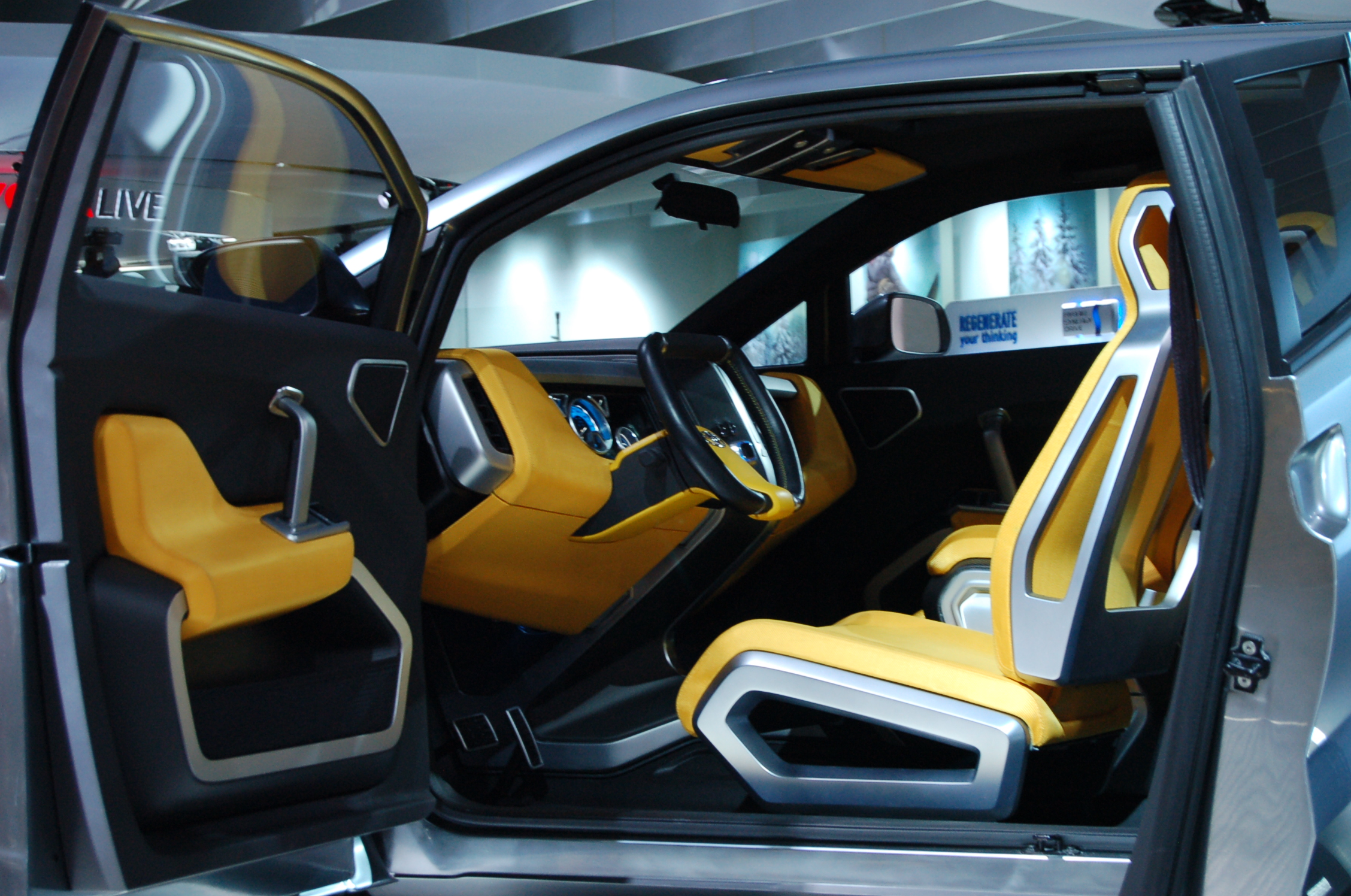
Interior

== FT-MV (2007) ==
Toyota FT-MV
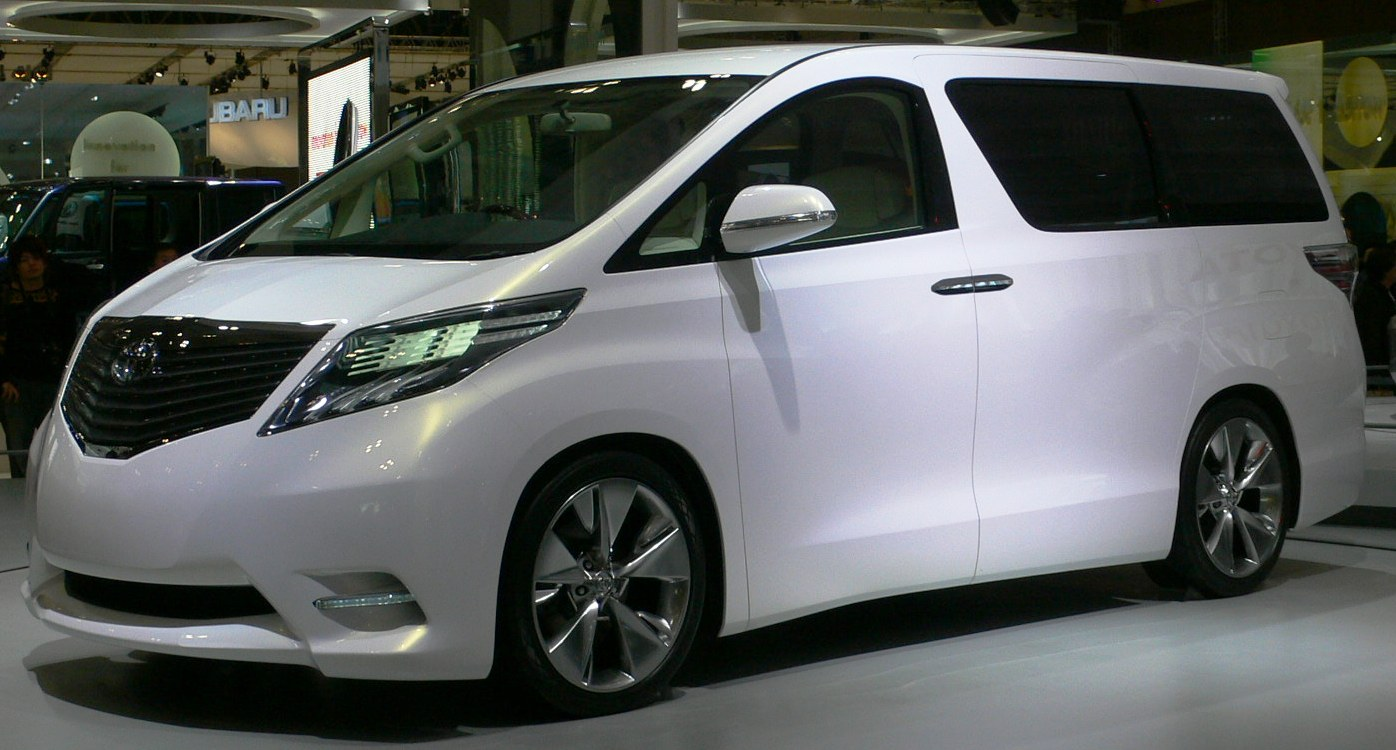

Overview
- Manufacturer: Toyota
- Production: 2007

Body and chassis
- Body style: Minivan
- Related: Toyota Alphard (AH20)

The FT-MV is a concept car made by Toyota in 2007. It entered production as the Toyota Alphard (AH20). The exterior is sculpted to create angular lines, punctuated by the LED lights. Inside, appointments are high-class, with reclining leather seats for the second row. Soft ambient lighting fills the spacious interior. Up front, a big computer screen lets drivers control vehicle functions.

== FCHV-adv (2008) ==
Toyota FCHV-adv
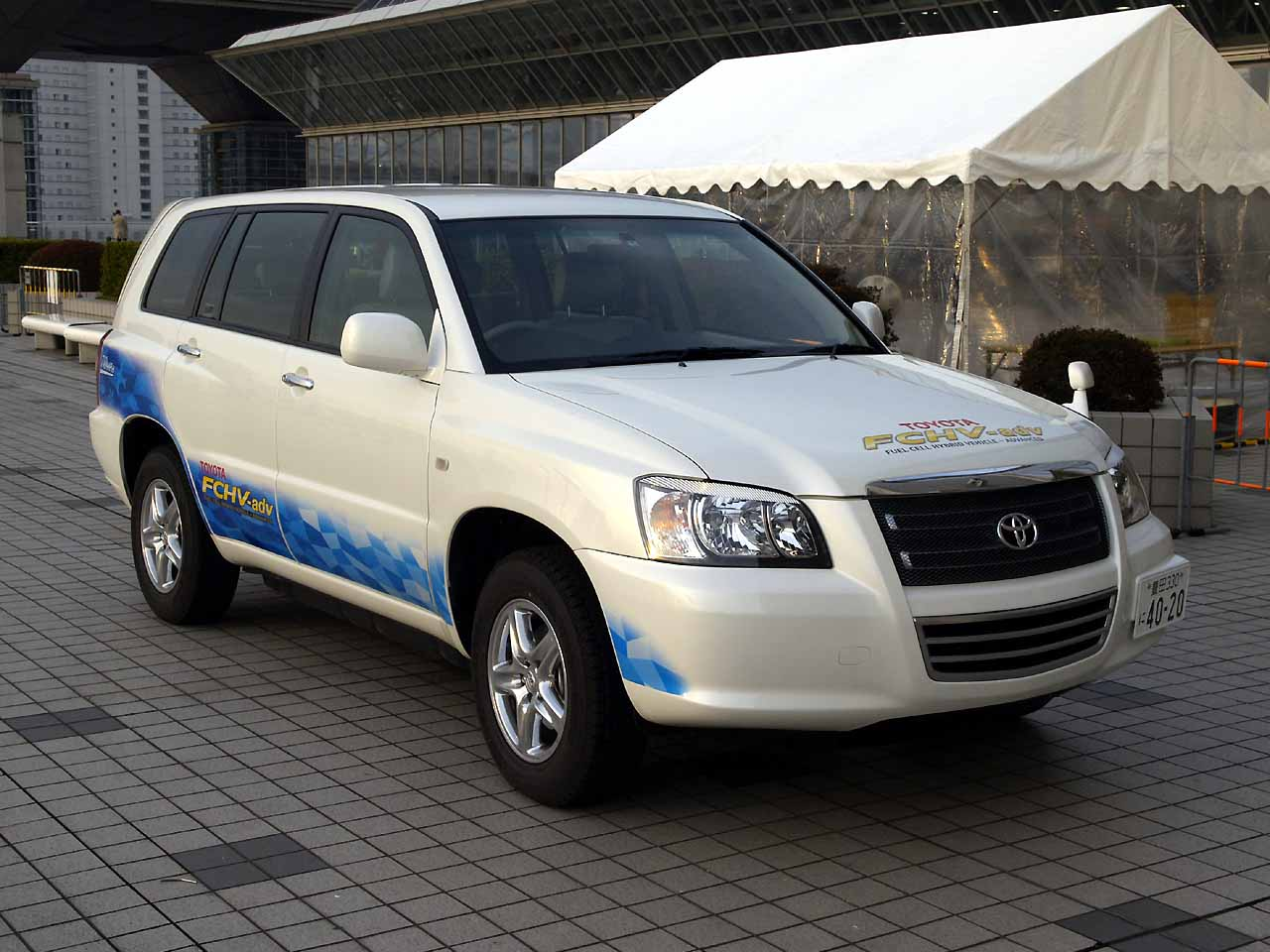

Overview
- Manufacturer: Toyota
- Production: 2008

Body and chassis
- Body style: SUV
- Related: Toyota Highlander (XU20); Lexus RX (XU10)

Powertrain
- Engine: 90kW fuel cell-stack

Dimensions
- Wheelbase: 2,715 mm (106.9 in)
- Length: 4,714 mm (185.6 in)
- Width: 1,826 mm (71.9 in)
- Height: 1,750 mm (68.9 in)
- Curb weight: 4,140 lb (1,880 kg)

Chronology
- Predecessor: Toyota FCHV-5

The FCHV-adv (Fuel Cell Hybrid Vehicle advanced) was the sixth vehicle built by Toyota in its Fuel Cell Vehicle program. It is an updated version of the FCHV-5 with a high-pressure hydrogen tank that increases its range to 830 km (515 miles). Like the FCHV-3, FCHV-4 and FCHV-5, it was based on the Highlander.

It was available through a leasing program in Japan from 11 September 2008.

== Winglet (2008) ==
Toyota Winglet
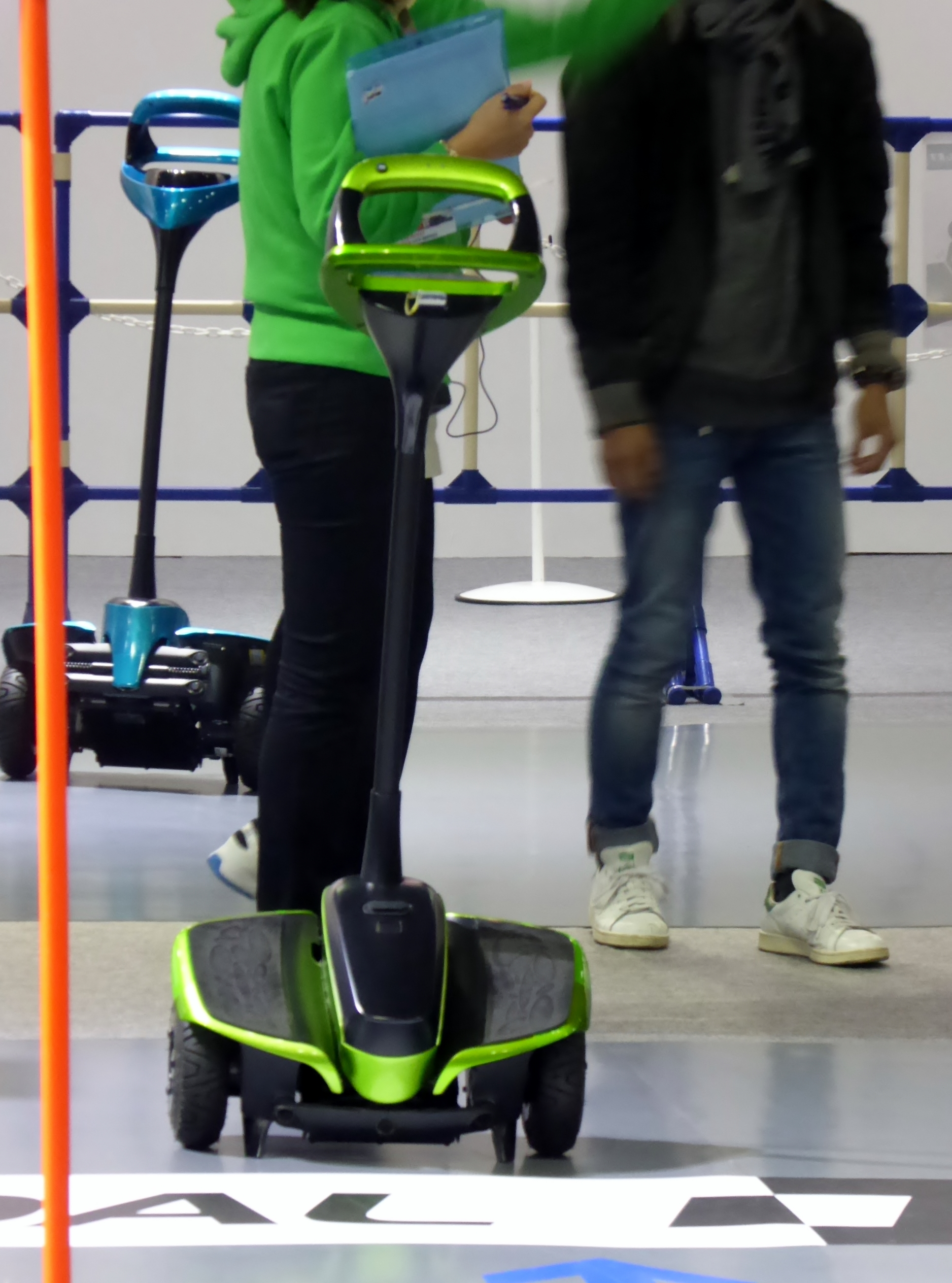

Overview
- Manufacturer: Toyota
- Production: 2008

Body and chassis
- Body style: Personal transporter

The Toyota Winglet is a concept self-balancing two-wheeled personal transporter similar in form and function to the Segway PT and the Honda U3-X. It is capable of cruising at 6 km/h (4 mph). Unveiled on 1 August 2008, it was not offered for consumer sale. Toyota tested the devices in the third quarter of 2009 at a Japanese airport and a seaside resort.

== Aygo Crazy (2008) ==
Toyota Aygo Crazy
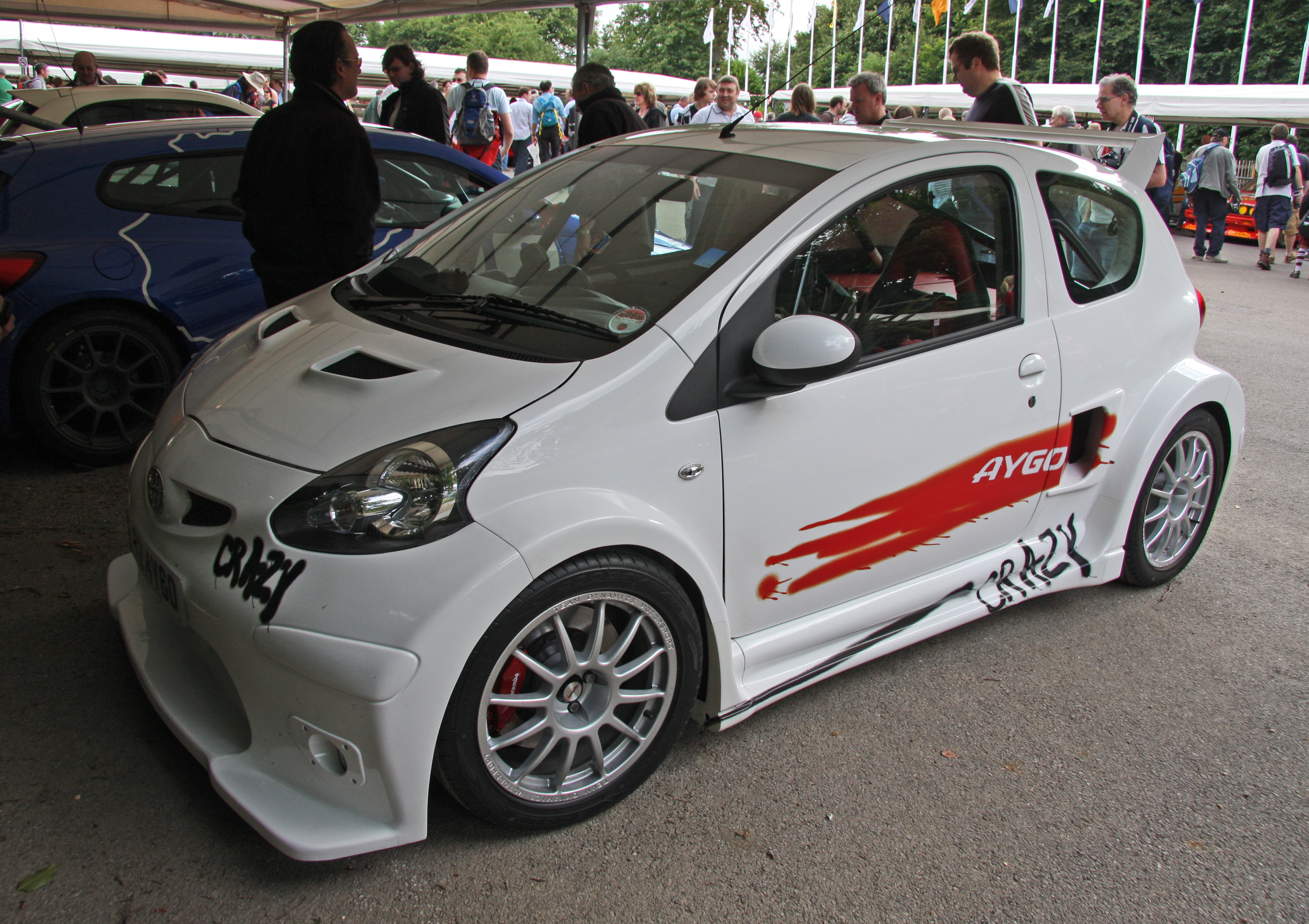

Overview
- Manufacturer: Toyota
- Production: 2008

The Aygo Crazy is a concept vehicle built by Toyota as a modified Toyota Aygo and first revealed at the July 2008 British International Motor Show.

== Camry CNG Hybrid (2008) ==
The Camry CNG Hybrid is based on the Toyota Camry XV40 hybrid edition. The hybrid electric vehicle (HEV) was introduced in 2008. It runs on a 2.4-liter inline-four engine, where two carbon-fiber-wrapped tanks hold the 8 gallons of natural-gas, at a maximum of 3600 psi, giving the CNG concept a 250-mile range. The fuel tanks live in the car's 19 inch wheels, and gets 32 mpg city and 34 mpg highway, only 1 mpg less than the regular Camry. However, charging these vehicles is tough; there is only about 770 CNG charging stations in the US.

== FT-EV (2009) ==
Toyota FT-EV
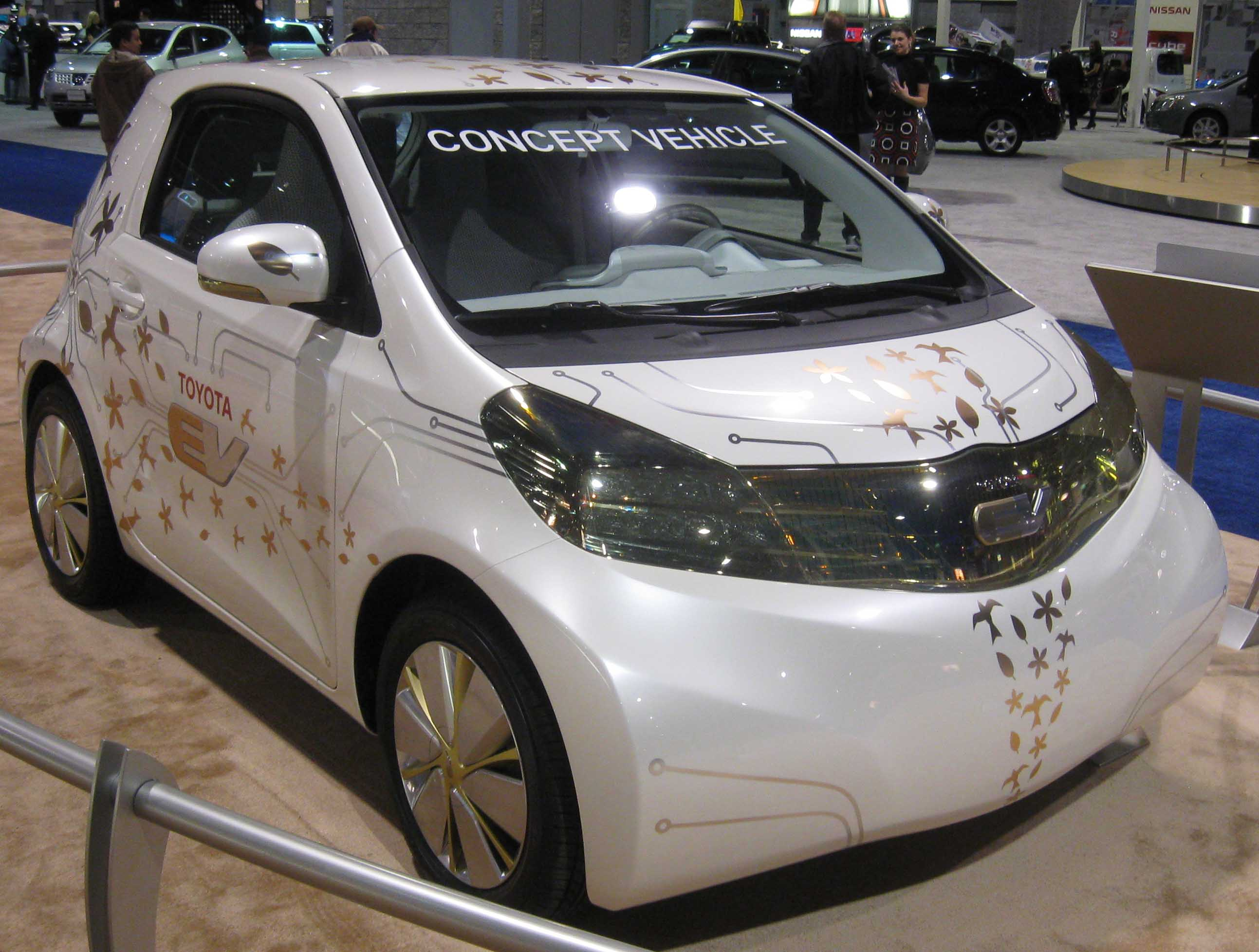

Overview
- Manufacturer: Toyota
- Production: 2009

Body and chassis
- Platform: iQ

Chronology
- Successor: FT-EV II

The Toyota FT-EV is a small, battery electric, concept vehicle built by Toyota as a modified Toyota iQ and demonstrated at the January 2009 North American International Auto Show. Two of the iQ's seats were removed to make room for the battery packs. Toyota plans to start selling the FT-EV in 2012. According to Toyota the FT-EV was designed as an urban commuter car with a range of 50 miles (80 km) per charge.

== FT-EV II (2009) ==
Toyota FT-EV II
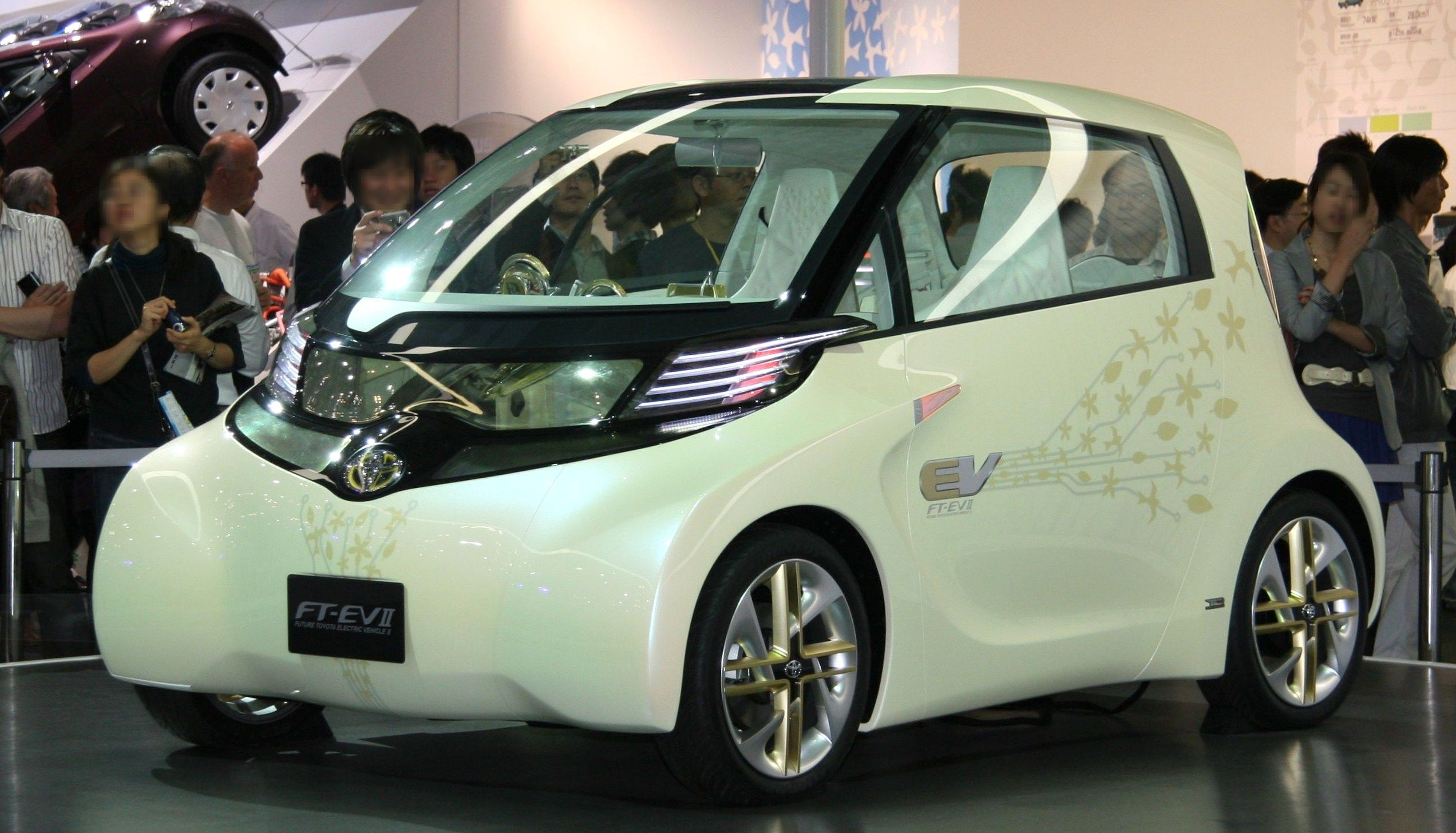

Overview
- Manufacturer: Toyota
- Production: 2009

Body and chassis
- Class: City car (A)
- Body style: 3-door hatchback
- Layout: Front-engine, front-wheel-drive
- Platform: iQ

Dimensions
- Wheelbase: 1,900 mm (74.8 in)
- Length: 2,730 mm (107.5 in)
- Width: 1,680 mm (66.1 in)
- Height: 1,490 mm (58.7 in)

Chronology
- Predecessor: FT-EV
- Successor: EV Prototype

The Toyota FT-EV II is a small, battery electric, concept car built by Toyota as a modified Toyota iQ and first shown at the October 2009 Tokyo Motor Show. It differs from the FT-EV by seating four people, by having more parts of the body transparent and electrically operated sliding doors. A pair of linked joysticks (each joystick duplicating the other) control acceleration, braking and steering using drive-by-wire. The top speed is over 100 km/h (62 mph) and the range is 90 km (56 mi).

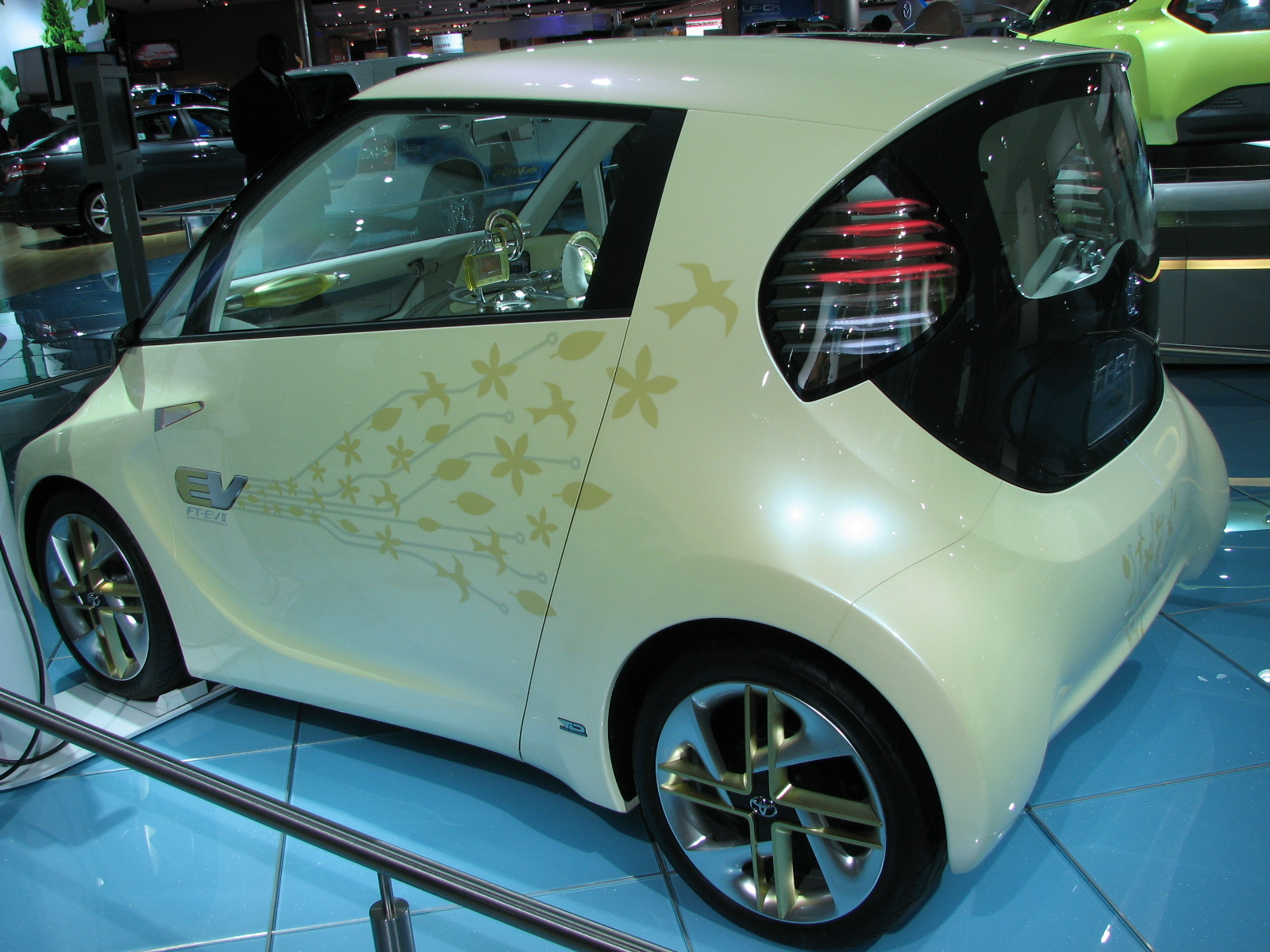
Rear

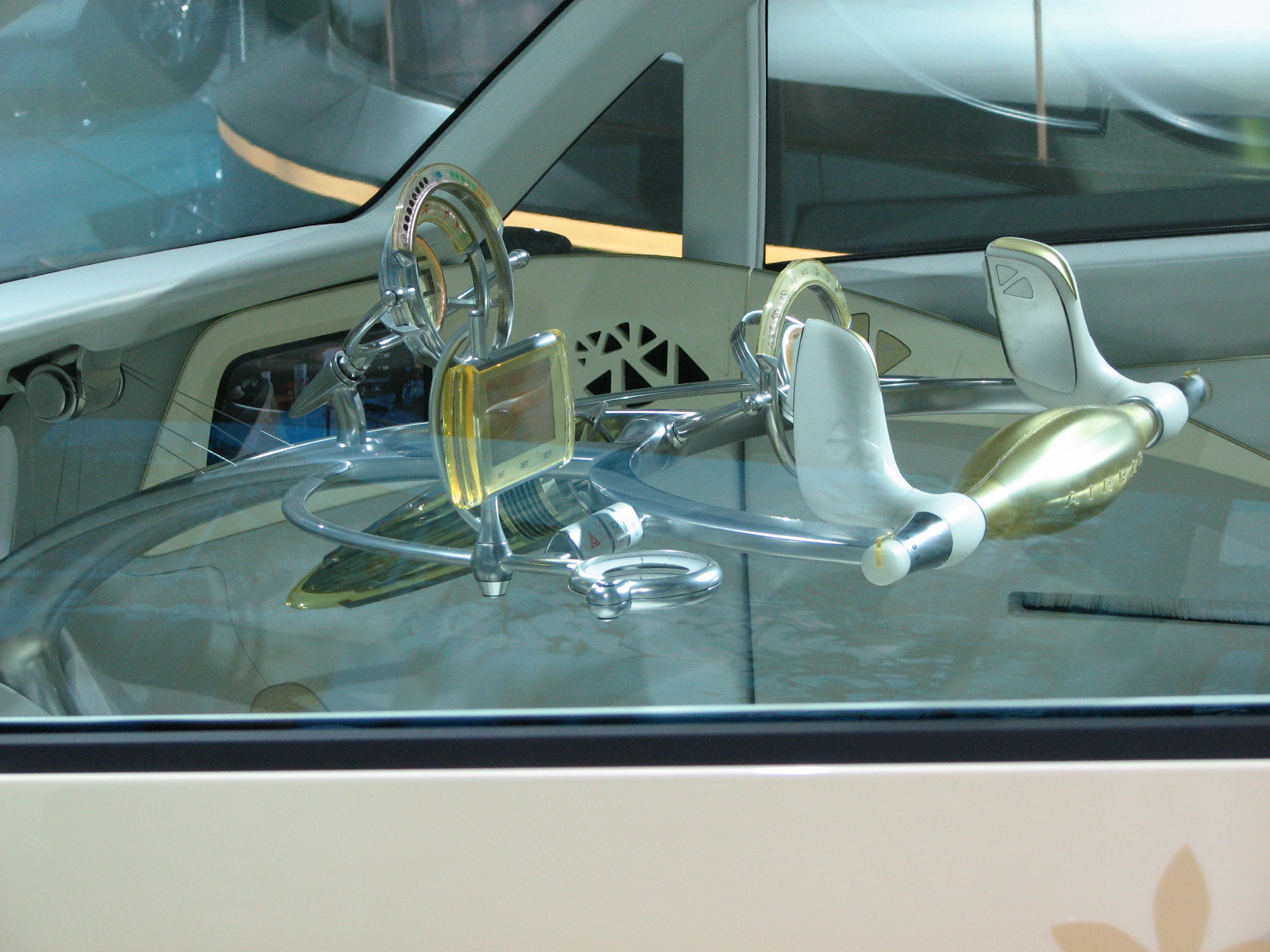
Interior controls

== Scion iQ Concept (2009) ==
Scion iQ Concept
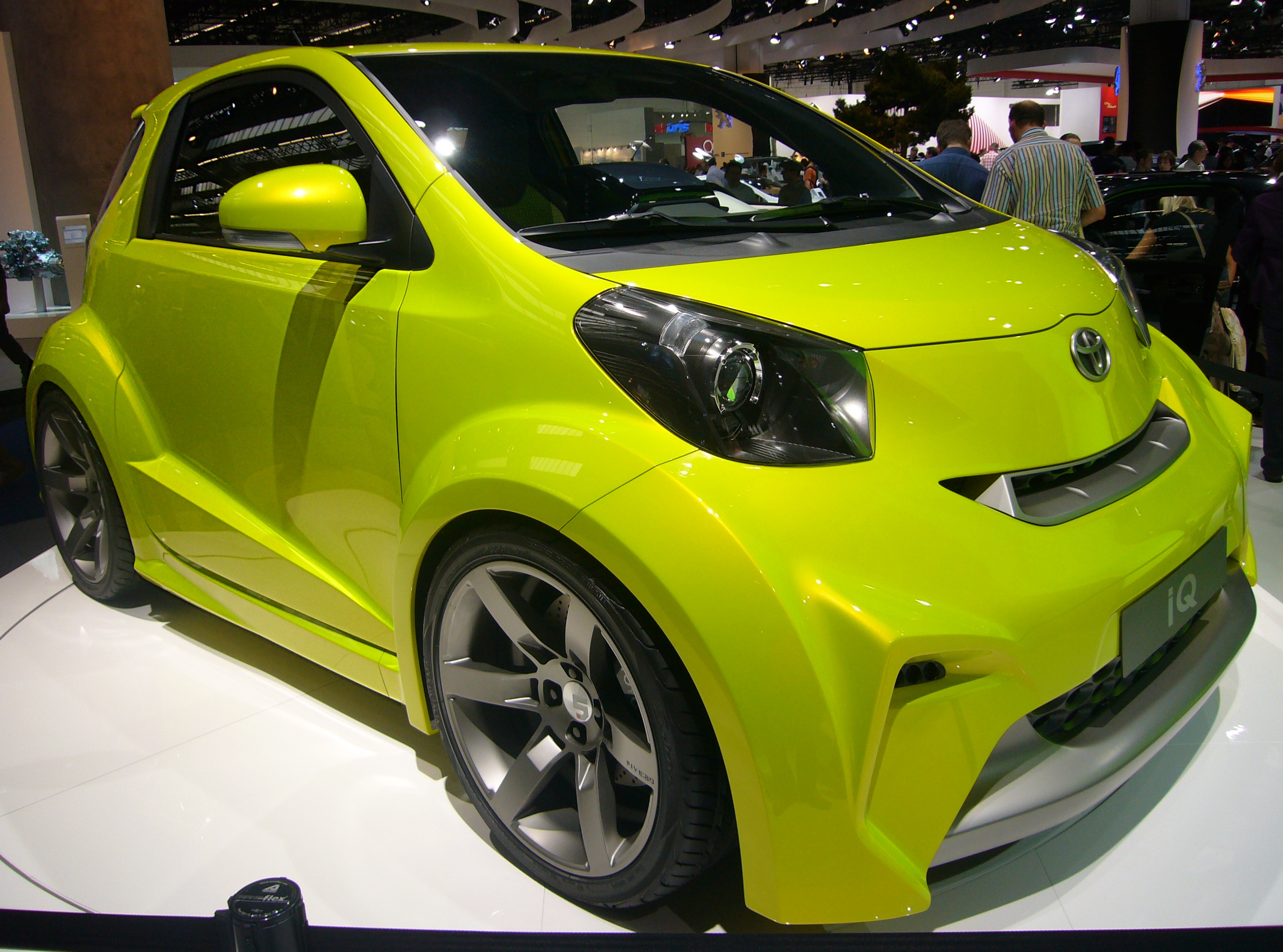

Overview
- Manufacturer: Scion
- Production: 2009

Body and chassis
- Class: City car
- Body style: 3-door hatchback
- Layout: FF
- Platform: iQ

Powertrain
- Engine: 1.3 L 1NR-FE petrol I4

Dimensions
- Wheelbase: 1,999 mm (78.7 in)
- Length: 3,223 mm (126.9 in)
- Width: 1,814 mm (71.4 in)
- Height: 1,445 mm (56.9 in)

The Scion iQ Concept vehicle was built by Five Axis (California, US), based on a production Toyota iQ, and displayed in April 2009 at the New York Auto Show. The concept is powered by a 1.3-litre four-cylinder VVT-i engine, with modifications including a Five Axis custom stainless exhaust, 18x8.5-inch Five:AD S6:F custom wheels with nickel finish prototyped by MetalFX, Yokohama S.drive 2.5/40R18 tires, TEIN Super Street coil over suspension, Five Axis wide body conversion kit, and custom accented headlights and tail lights.

An identical car, rebadged as the Toyota iQ Sport, was later presented at the September 2009 Frankfurt Motor Show.

Motor Trend reported the production version of Scion iQ would begin in North America in late 2010 for the 2011 model year, or in early 2011 for the 2012 model year. The air bags will be recalibrated for unbelted and out-of-position occupants and the bumpers will be slightly extended.

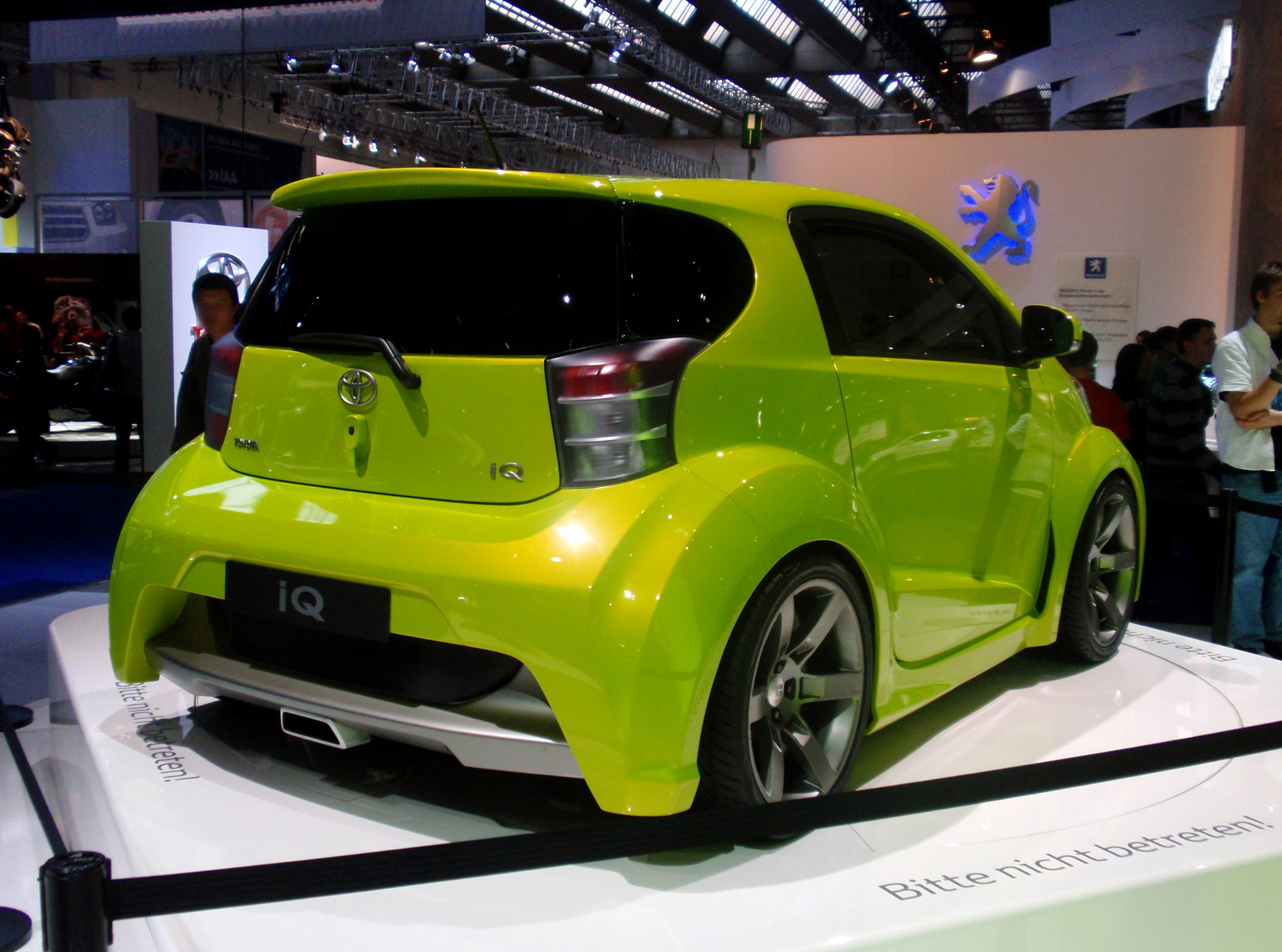
Rear

== Auris HSD Full Hybrid Concept (2009) ==
Toyota Auris HSD Full Hybrid Concept
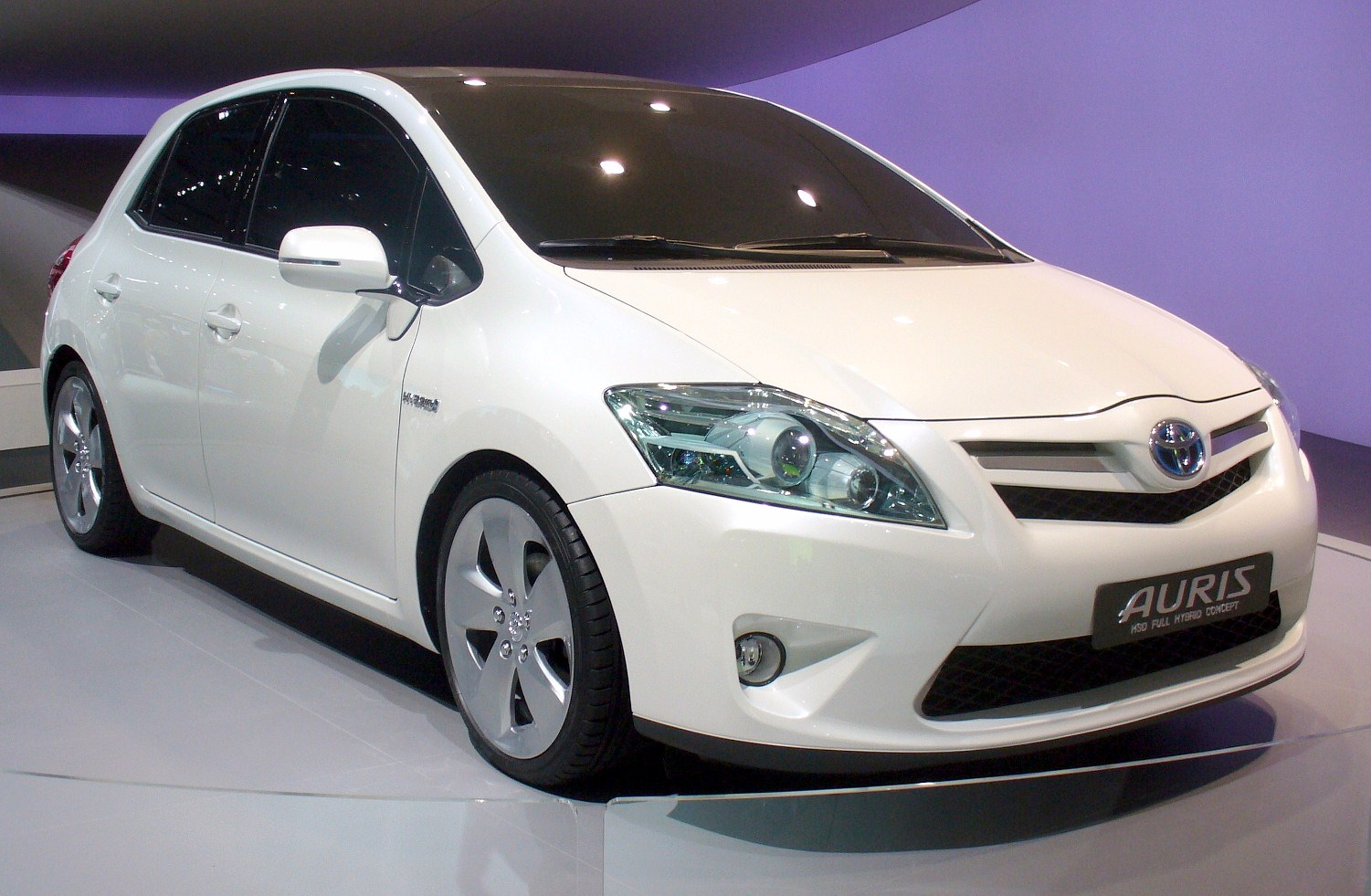

Overview
- Manufacturer: Toyota
- Production: 2009

The Toyota Auris HSD Full Hybrid Concept vehicle was a petrol-electric hybrid vehicle based on the Auris and displayed at the September 2009 Frankfurt Motor Show.

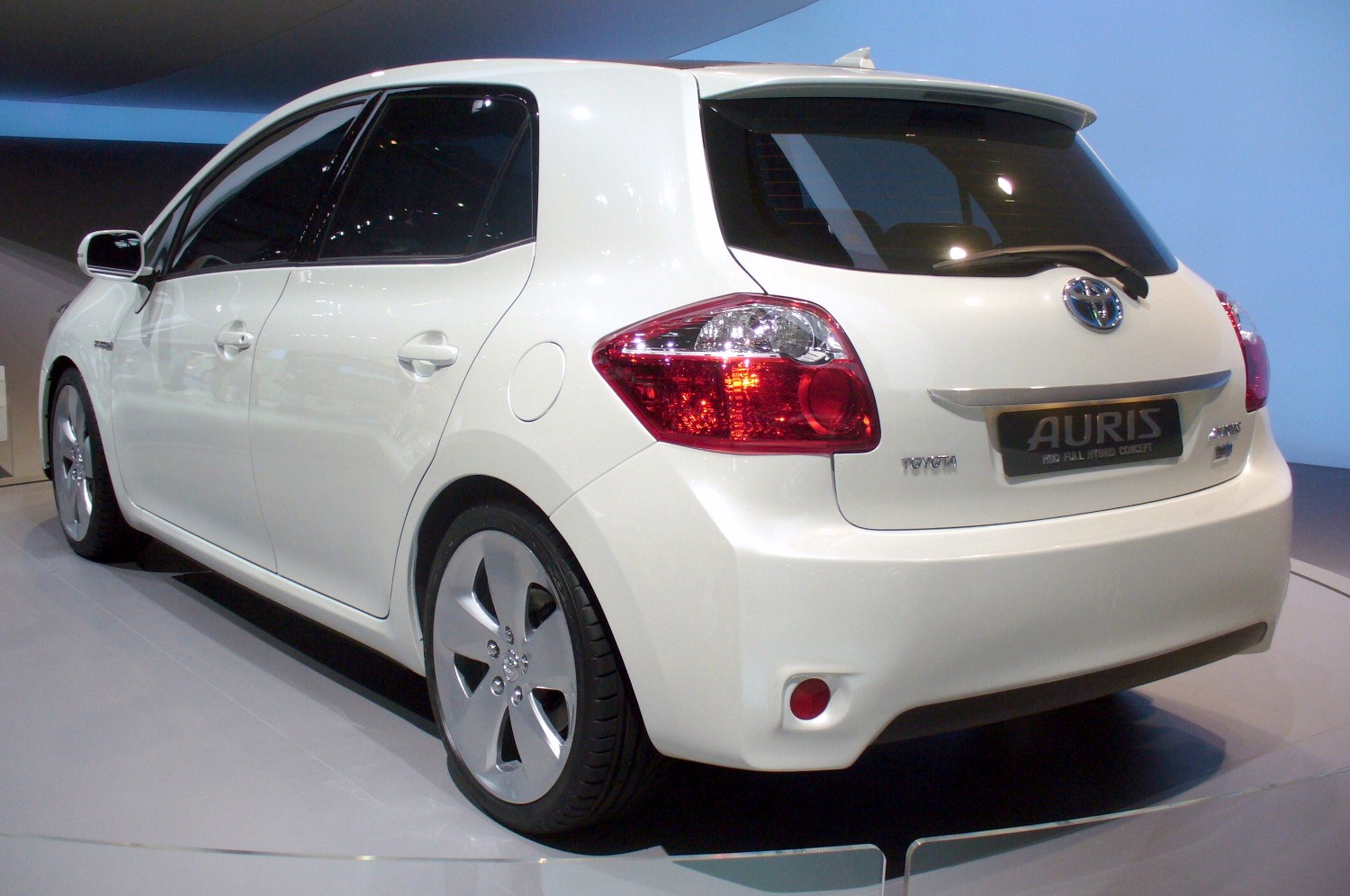
Rear

== FT-86 (2009) ==
FT-86
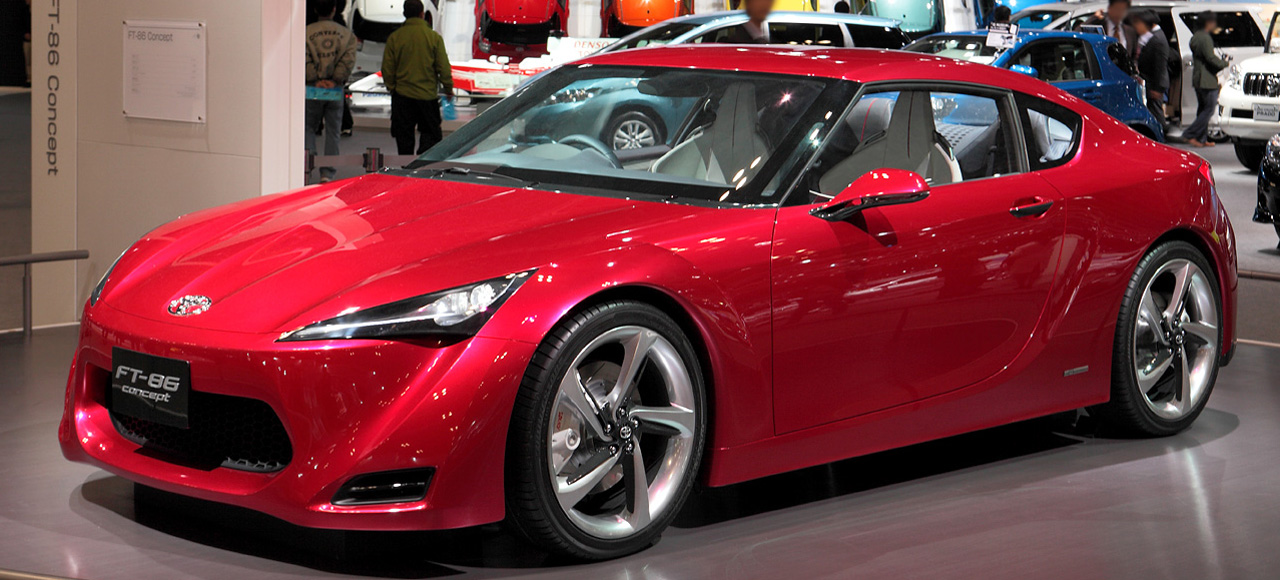

Overview
- Manufacturer: Toyota & Subaru
- Also called: Subaru BRZ
- Production: 2009

Body and chassis
- Body style: Coupé
- Layout: FR Toyota FR Subaru
- Platform: shortened Subaru Impreza

Powertrain
- Engine: 2.0 L Toyota-Subaru "D-4S" Flat-4
- Transmission: 6-speed manual

Dimensions
- Wheelbase: 2,570 mm (101.2 in)
- Length: 4,160 mm (163.8 in)
- Width: 1,760 mm (69.3 in)
- Height: 1,260 mm (49.6 in)

Chronology
- Successor: FT-86 G Sports

The Toyota FT-86 is a concept car manufactured jointly by Toyota and Subaru. It was designed by the Toyota ED² studio in France. The vehicle consists of many design cues from the earlier FT-HS concept. It features a 2.0-litre Toyota-Subaru "D-4S" boxer engine. The FT-86 rides on a modified Subaru Impreza platform with 101.2-inch wheelbase, with length, width, and height measuring 163.8, 69.3, and 49.6 inches, respectively.

It has a 2.0-litre naturally aspirated boxer engine mated to a Subaru 6-speed manual transmission. The concept is fitted with brakes from Advics, a joint venture company formed between Aisin Seiki, Denso, Sumitomo Electric and Toyota.

According to chief engineer Tetsuya Tada, the unique shoujyouhi red colour was based on the colour of a Japanese monkey's backside.

The FT-86 was first shown at the October 2009 Tokyo Motor Show and the first showing outside Japan was at the March 2010 Geneva Motor Show.

An enhanced version called the FT-86 G Sports was shown at the January 2010 Tokyo Auto Salon as part of the Toyota G Sports range. Toyota Europe presented a revised FT-86 II at the March 2011 Geneva Motor Show as the successor to the FT-86.

At the October 2009 Tokyo Motor Show, Jim Lentz, COO and President of Toyota Motor Sales USA confirmed that the production version of the FT-86 was scheduled to be sold in America. At the March 2010 Geneva Motor Show, Toyota Europe announced that the production version of the vehicle will be released in November 2011.

On 2 September 2010, British car magazine AutoExpress reported the Subaru model will feature an all-wheel-drive drivetrain as opposed to the salient feature of rear-wheel drive for the Toyota-badged model. They claimed the Subaru model's all-wheel-drive system would have a rear-wheel bias, improving handling. The flat-four, longitudinal engine layout would also be fully coherent with the model policy and mechanical characteristics of all Subaru cars of the past 30 years. The production version, however, opted for rear-wheel drive like its Toyota counterpart.

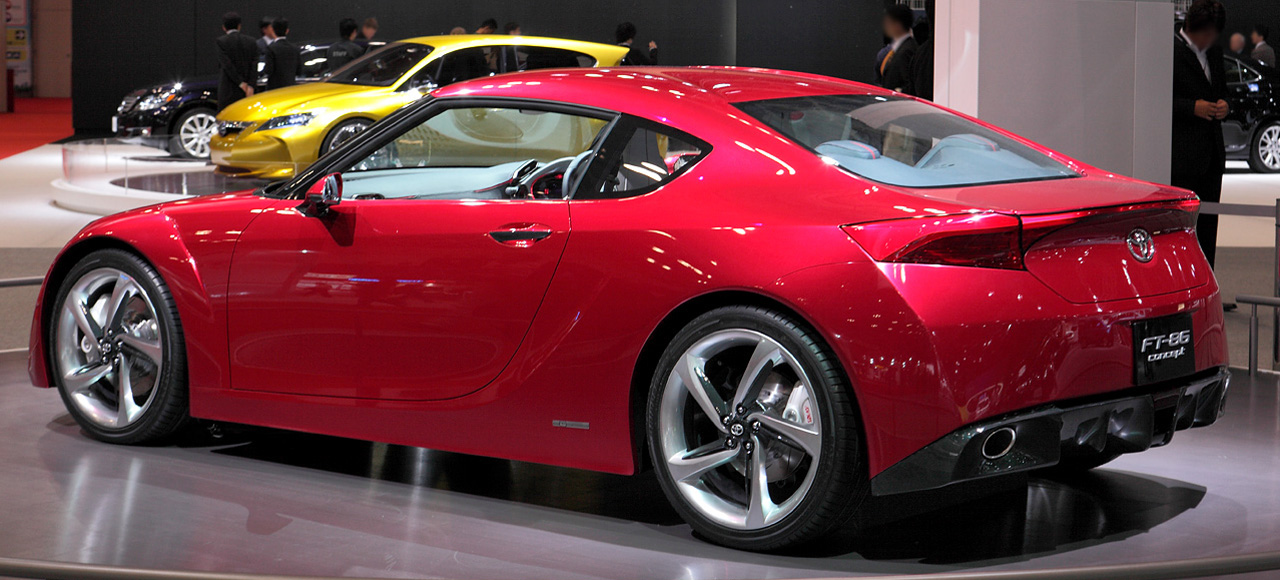
Rear

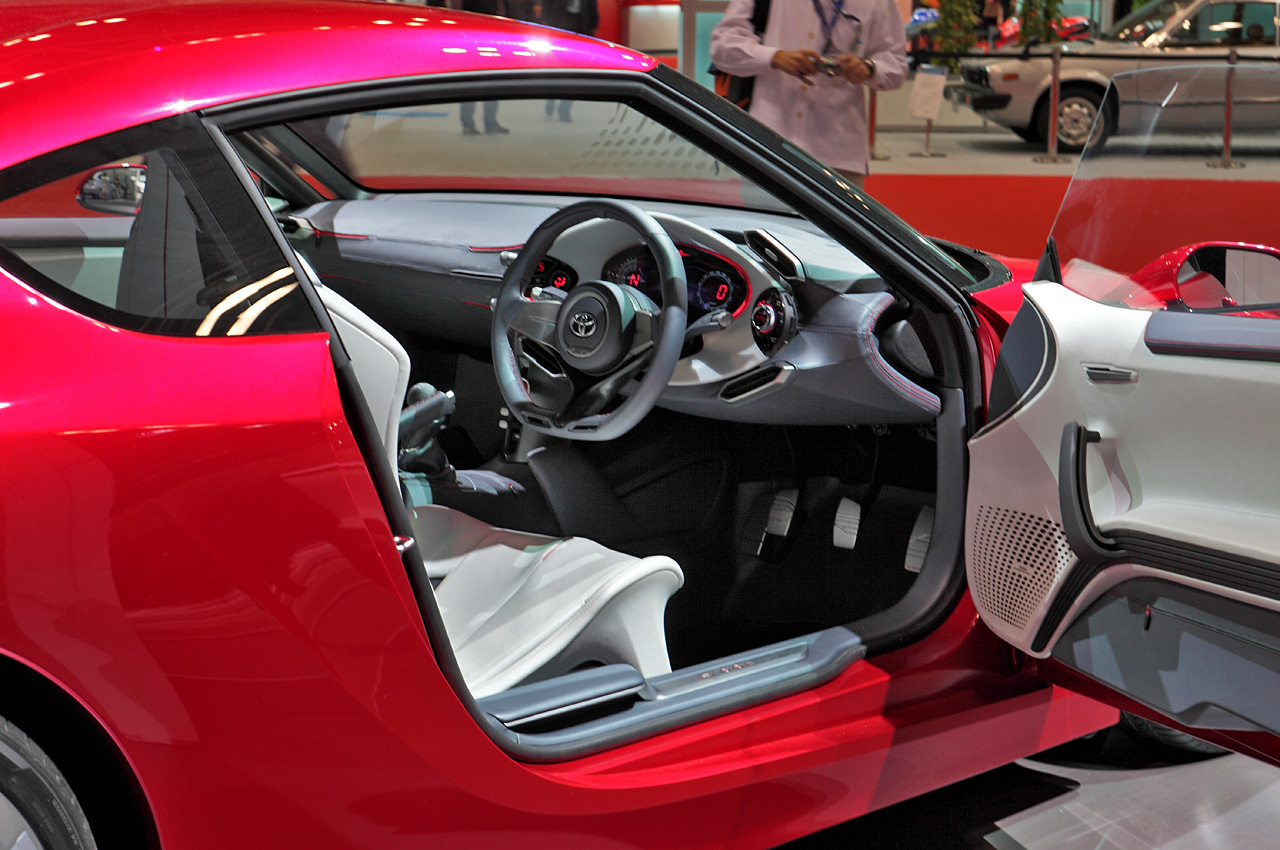
Interior

== Prius Plug-In Hybrid Concept (2009) ==
Prius Plug-In Hybrid Concept
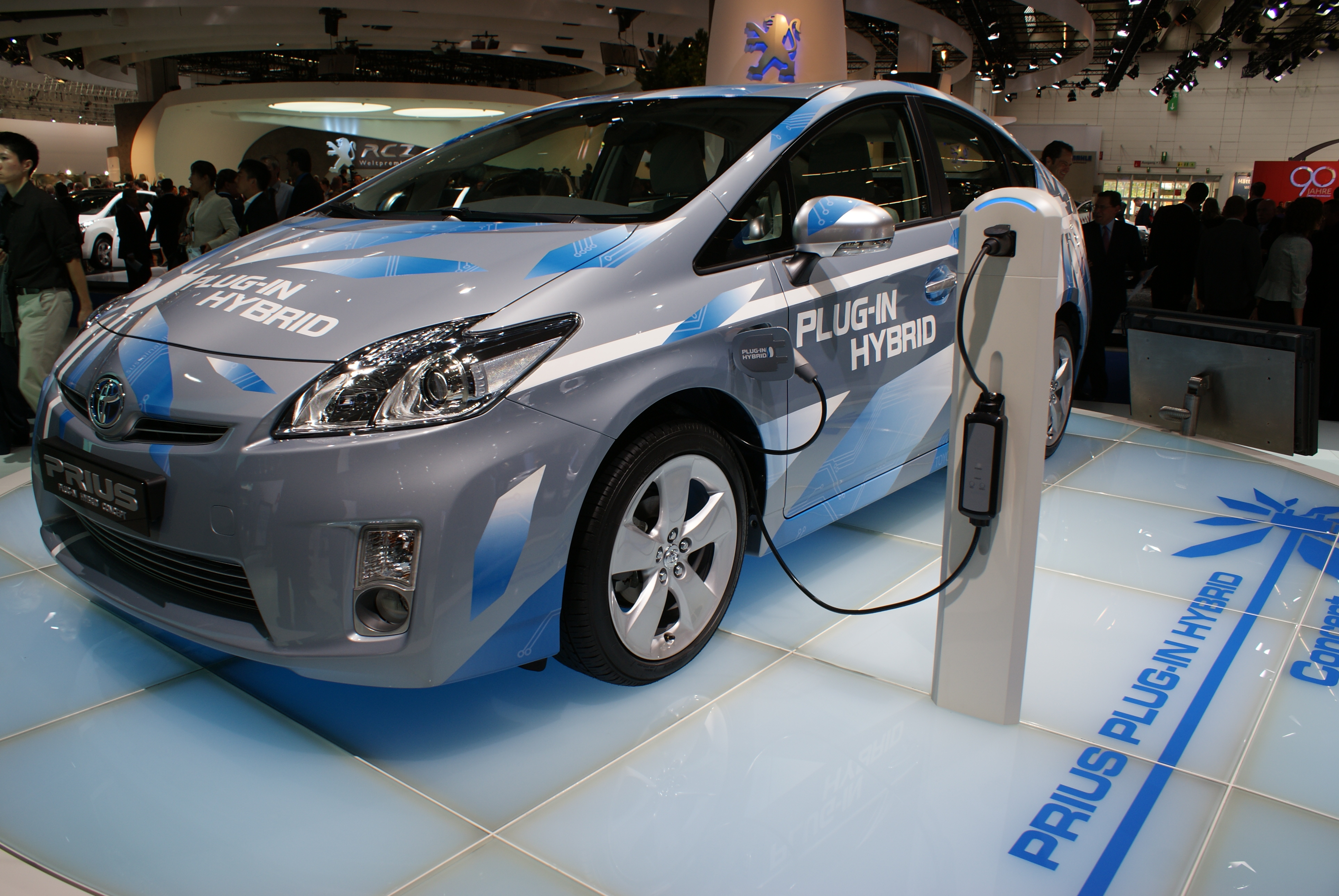

Overview
- Manufacturer: Toyota
- Production: 2009

Body and chassis
- Class: Compact car
- Body style: 5-door hatchback
- Layout: FF
- Platform: XW30 Prius

Powertrain
- Engine: 1.8 L 2ZR-FXE I4 & electric motor
- Transmission: 1-speed planetary gear

Dimensions
- Length: 4,460 mm (175.6 in)
- Width: 1,745 mm (68.7 in)
- Height: 1,480 mm (58.3 in)

The Prius Plug-In Concept is a plug-in hybrid concept car shown at the October 2009 Tokyo Motor Show based on the third generation Prius and the predecessor of the for-mass-production Toyota Prius Plug-in Hybrid. Its batteries can be charged in 180 minutes from 100 volts or in 100 minutes from 200 volts and can travel 20 km before needing to start the petrol engine.

== See also ==
- Toyota concept vehicles (1935–1969)
- Toyota concept vehicles (1970–1979)
- Toyota concept vehicles (1980–1989)
- Toyota concept vehicles (1990–1999)
- Toyota concept vehicles (2010–2019)
- Toyota concept vehicles (2020–2029)
