= Toyota concept vehicles (2020–2029) =

List of concept vehicles made by Toyota

This is a list of concept vehicles made by Toyota from the years 2020–2029.

== HYBARI (2021) ==
Toyota HYBARI
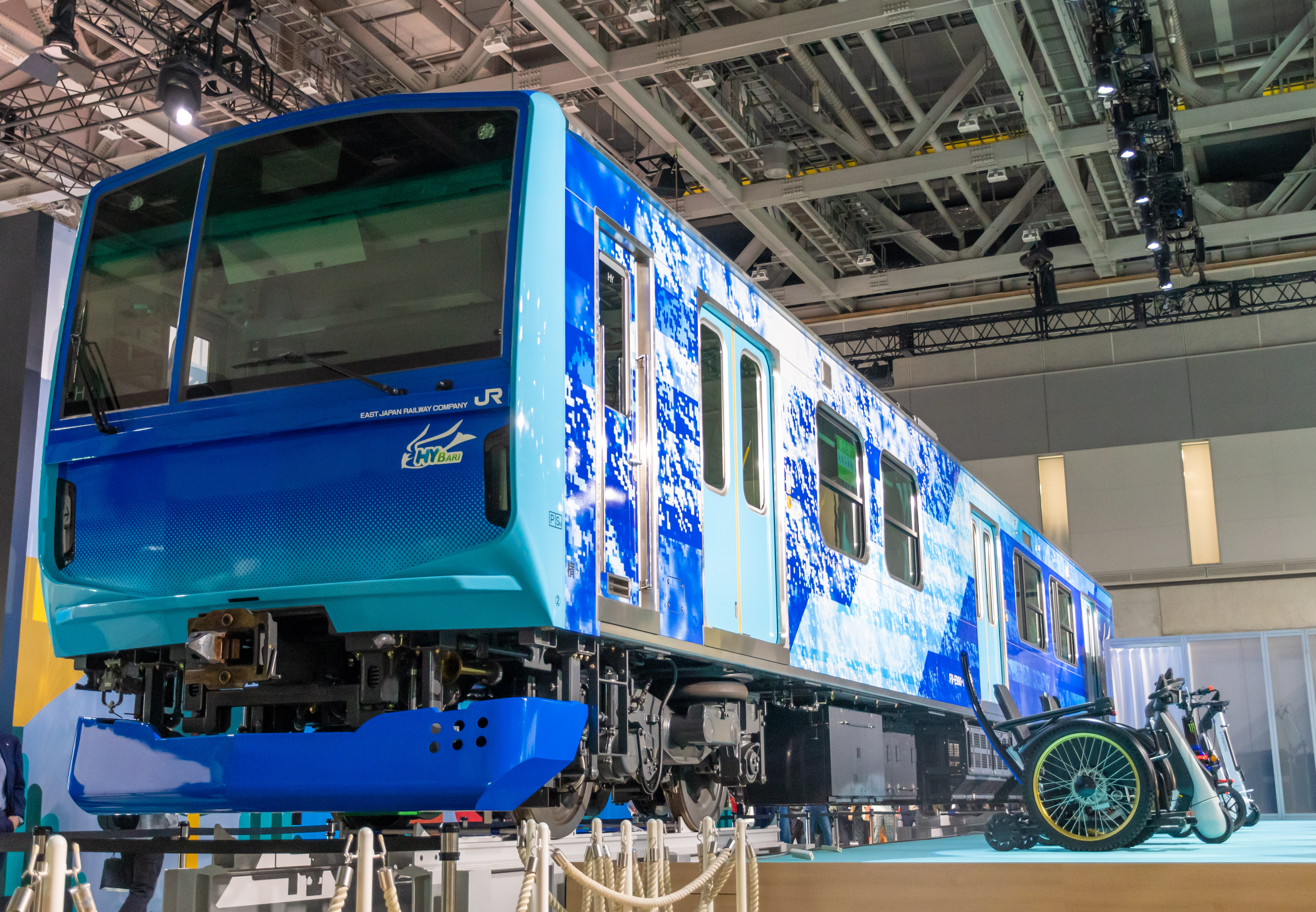
- Toyota "HYBARI" exhibited at Japan Mobility Show 2023

Overview
- Manufacturer: Toyota, JR East, Hitachi
- Production: 2021 (testing in 2022)
- Assembly: Japan

Body and chassis
- Class: Train
- Body style: 2 car train
- Platform: FV-E991 series

Powertrain
- Engine: 2 lithium-ion battery (120 kWh each)

The Toyota HYBARI (Hydrogen-Hybrid Advanced Rail vehicle for Innovation) is a train made in partnership with JR East and Hitachi. It will be a 100% hydrogen powered train that would run on the Tsurumi Line and Nambu Line. It is an FV-E991 series train with two cars, and has a top speed of 100 km/h (62 mph)

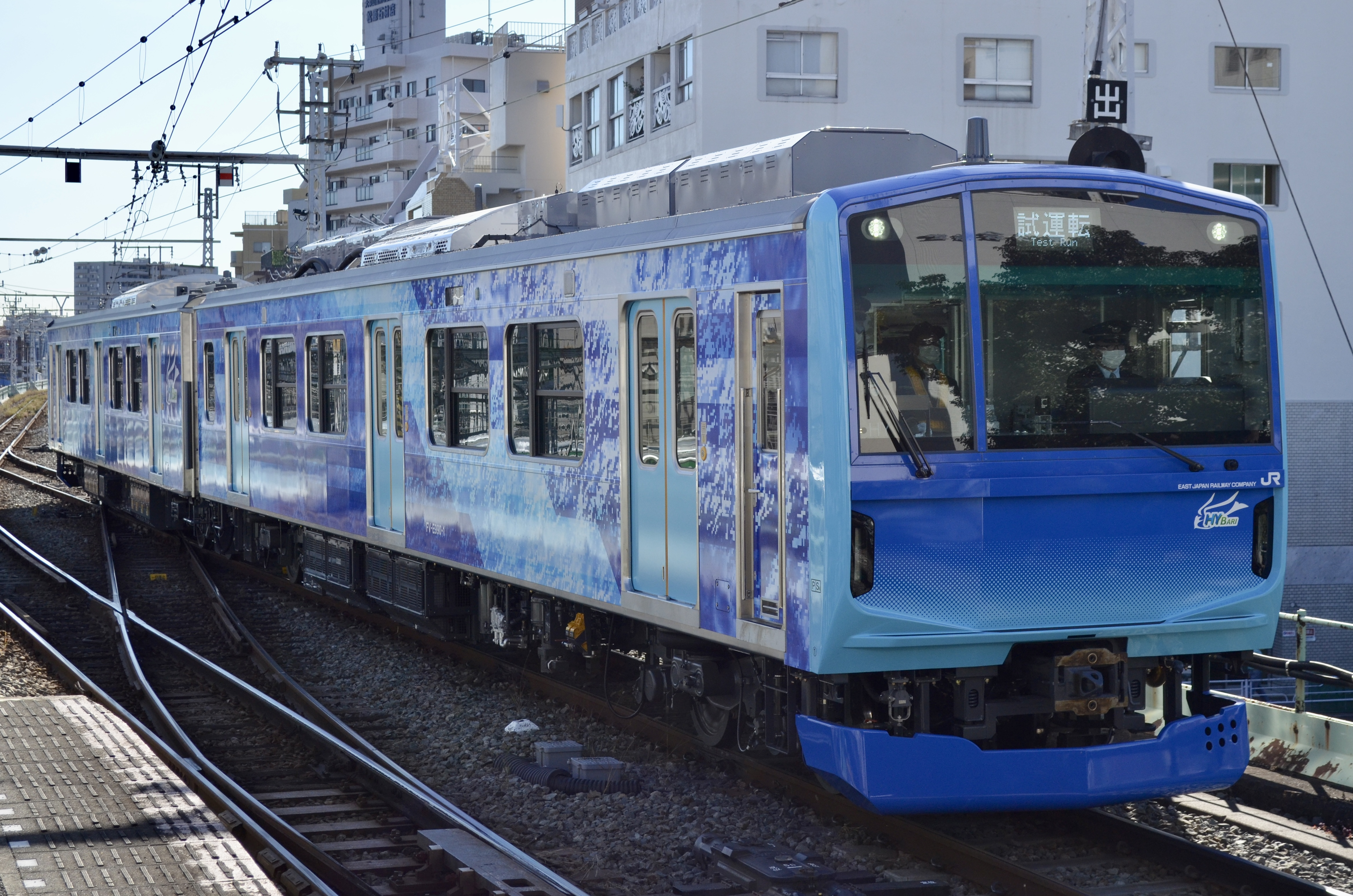
FV-E991 "HYBARI" train undergoing test runs on the Tsurumi Line (November 2022)

Testing began in March 2022. Since March 2022, the FV-E991 series has operated on the Tsurumi Line and Nambu Line as a test unit. JR East plans to implement fuel cell rolling stock on apromexiately from fiscal 2030.

== Aygo X prologue (2021) ==
The Aygo X prologue was unveiled in March 2021 by Toyota Motor Europe. It previewed the production Aygo X that was unveiled in November 2021.

== bZ4X (2021) ==
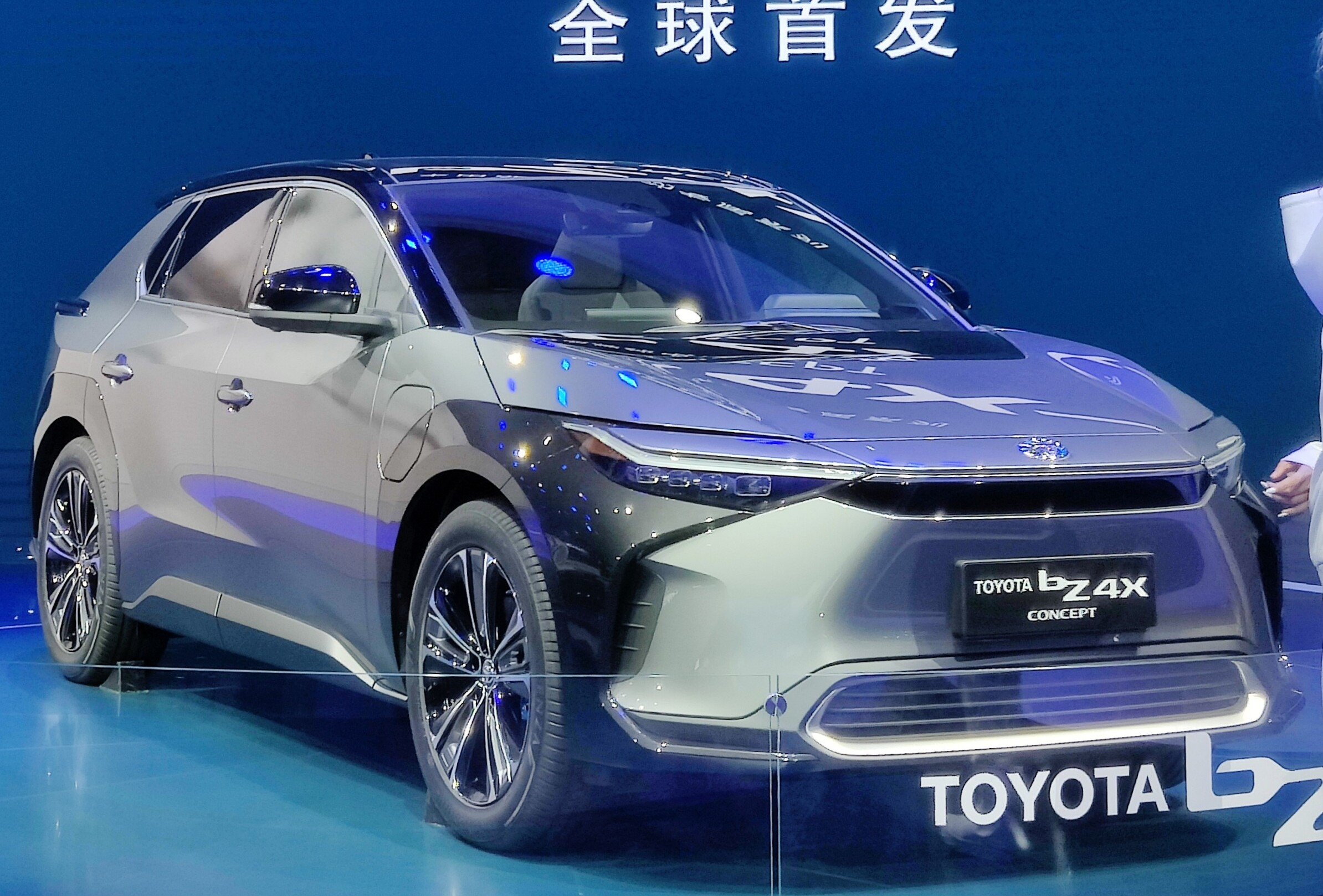
The bZ4x Concept showcased at Auto Shanghai in 2021

The Toyota bZ4X Concept was revealed on 19 April 2021 and was presented at Auto Shanghai on the same day.

== GR Supra Sport Top Concept (2021) ==
Toyota GR Supra Sport Top Concept

Overview
- Manufacturer: Toyota
- Production: 2021

Body and chassis
- Class: Sports car
- Body style: 2-door targa top
- Layout: Front-engine, rear-wheel-drive
- Related: Toyota Supra (J29)

Powertrain
- Engine: 3.0 L BMW B58 turbo I6
- Transmission: 8-speed automatic

The GR Supra Sport Top Concept is based on the J29 GR Supra. The roof of the car was removed and replaced with a carbon fibre targa top panel. The underside of the car was braced to retain the structural strength. A rear wing, custom rear diffuser and a custom exhaust system were also added. The vehicle was shown at the November 2020 SEMA360 online show.

== GR Yaris Hydrogen (2021) ==
Toyota GR Yaris Hydrogen Concept

Overview
- Manufacturer: Toyota
- Production: 2021

Body and chassis
- Class: Hot hatch/Sport compact (B)
- Body style: 3-door hatchback
- Layout: Front-engine, four-wheel-drive
- Platform: TNGA: GA-B (front)/GA-C (rear)
- Related: Toyota GR Yaris

Powertrain
- Engine: 1.6 L G16E-GTS turbo I3
- Transmission: 6-speed V16-series manual

The GR Yaris Hydrogen is a GR Yaris with a modified G16E-GTS engine to run with hydrogen fuel.

== Battery electric vehicles (2021) ==
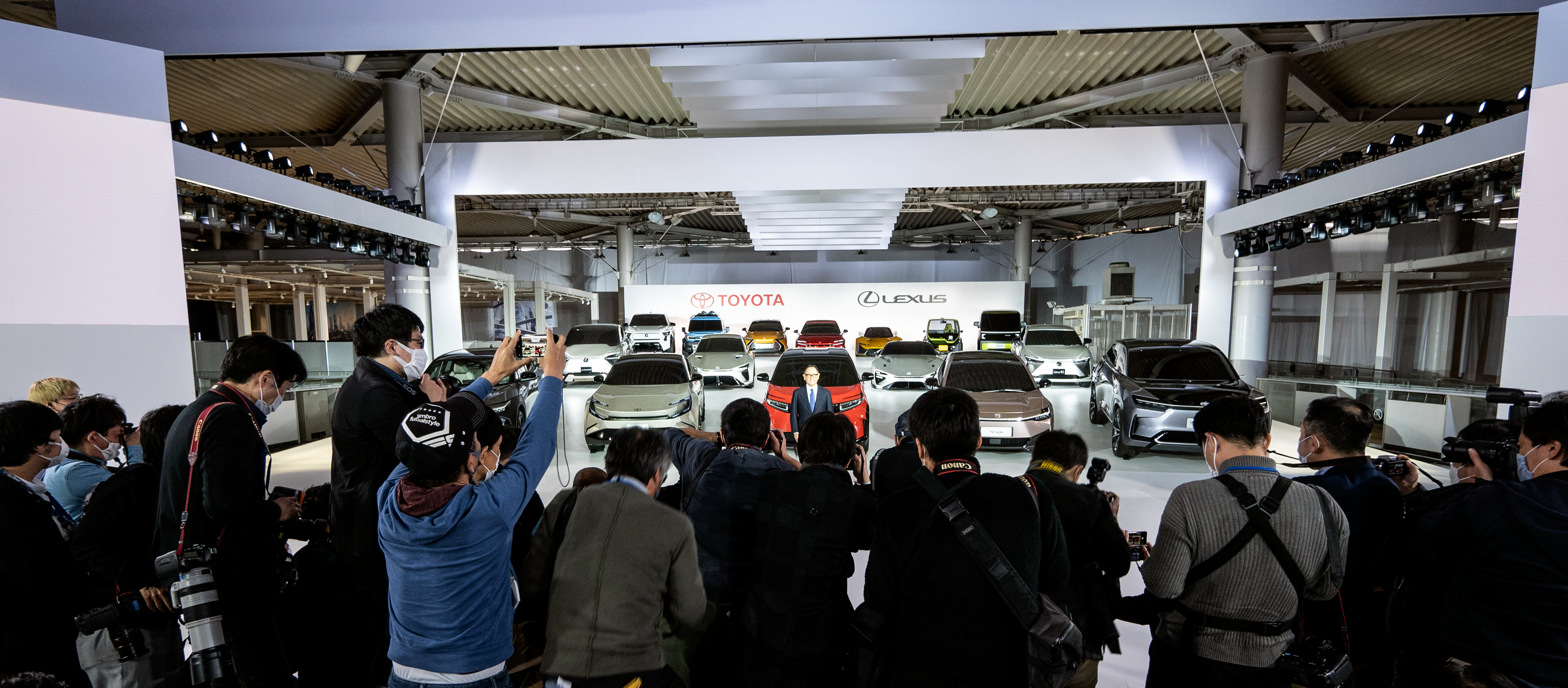
Akio Toyoda shows prototypes of 15 BEVs during Toyota's briefing on BEV strategies in December 2021

In December 2021, Toyota revealed a number of battery electric vehicle concepts to be produced up to 2025 as follows:

- Four bZ series models:
  - bZ Compact SUV (previewed again individually in December 2022, revealed as the C-HR+ in March 2025)
  - bZ Large SUV (revealed as the fifth-generation Highlander in February 2026)
  - bZ Small Crossover
  - bZ SDN (sedan) (revealed as the bZ3 in October 2022)
- Compact Cruiser EV (revealed as the Land Cruiser FJ in October 2025)
- Sport Crossover EV (revealed as the bZ5 in September 2024)
- Pickup EV (revealed as the fourth generation Tacoma in May 2023)
- Small SU EV (further previewed as the C-HR prologue in December 2022, revealed as the second generation C-HR in June 2023)
- Sports EV
- Micro Box
- Mid Box

In addition, four Lexus-branded concepts were shown.

== GR GT3 Concept (2022) ==
Toyota GR GT3 Concept
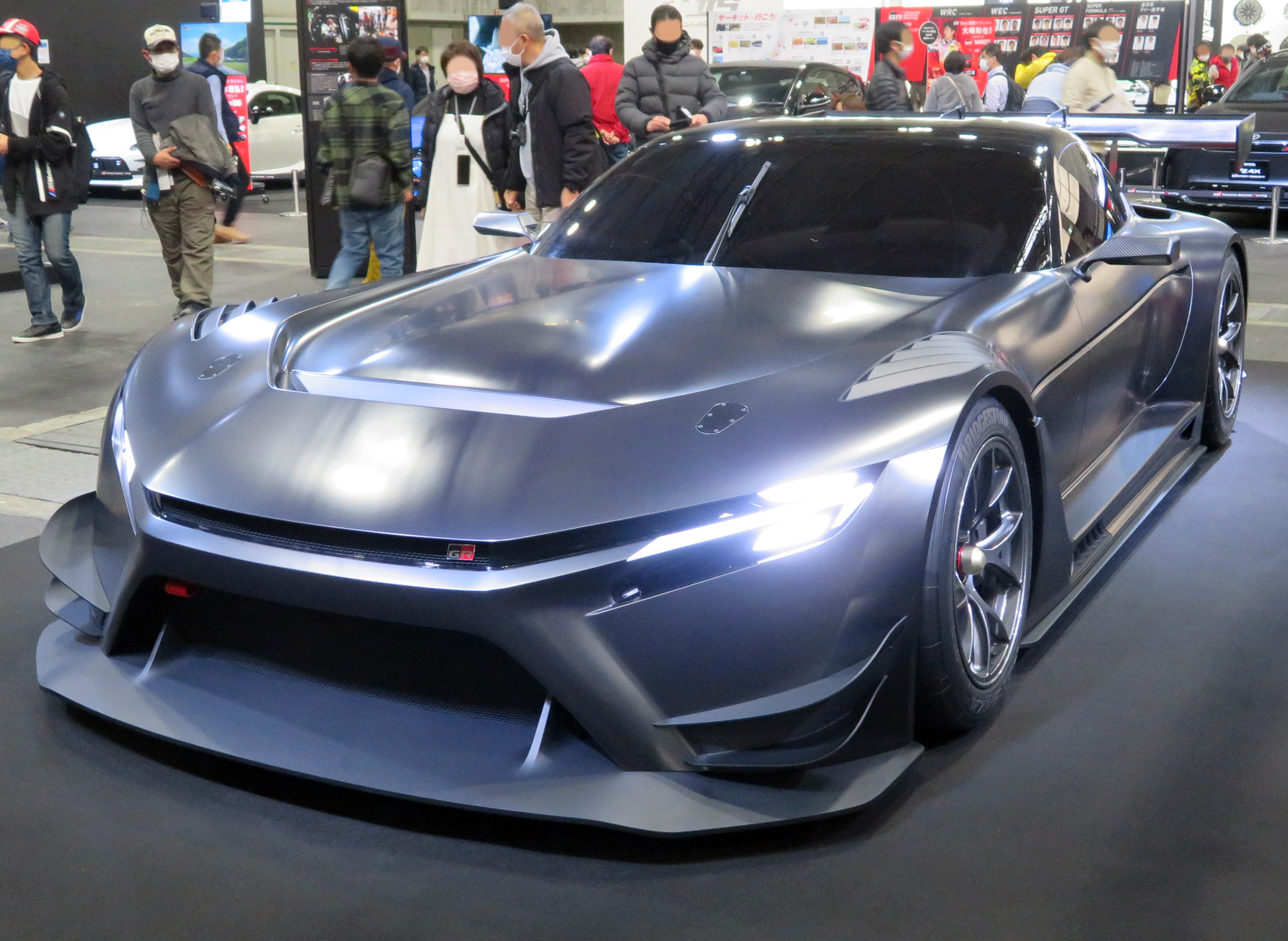

Overview
- Manufacturer: Toyota
- Production: 2022

Body and chassis
- Body style: 2-door coupe

The GR GT3 Concept is a GT3-inspired concept car that was shown at the January 2022 Tokyo Auto Salon. It is expected to enter production in 2026.

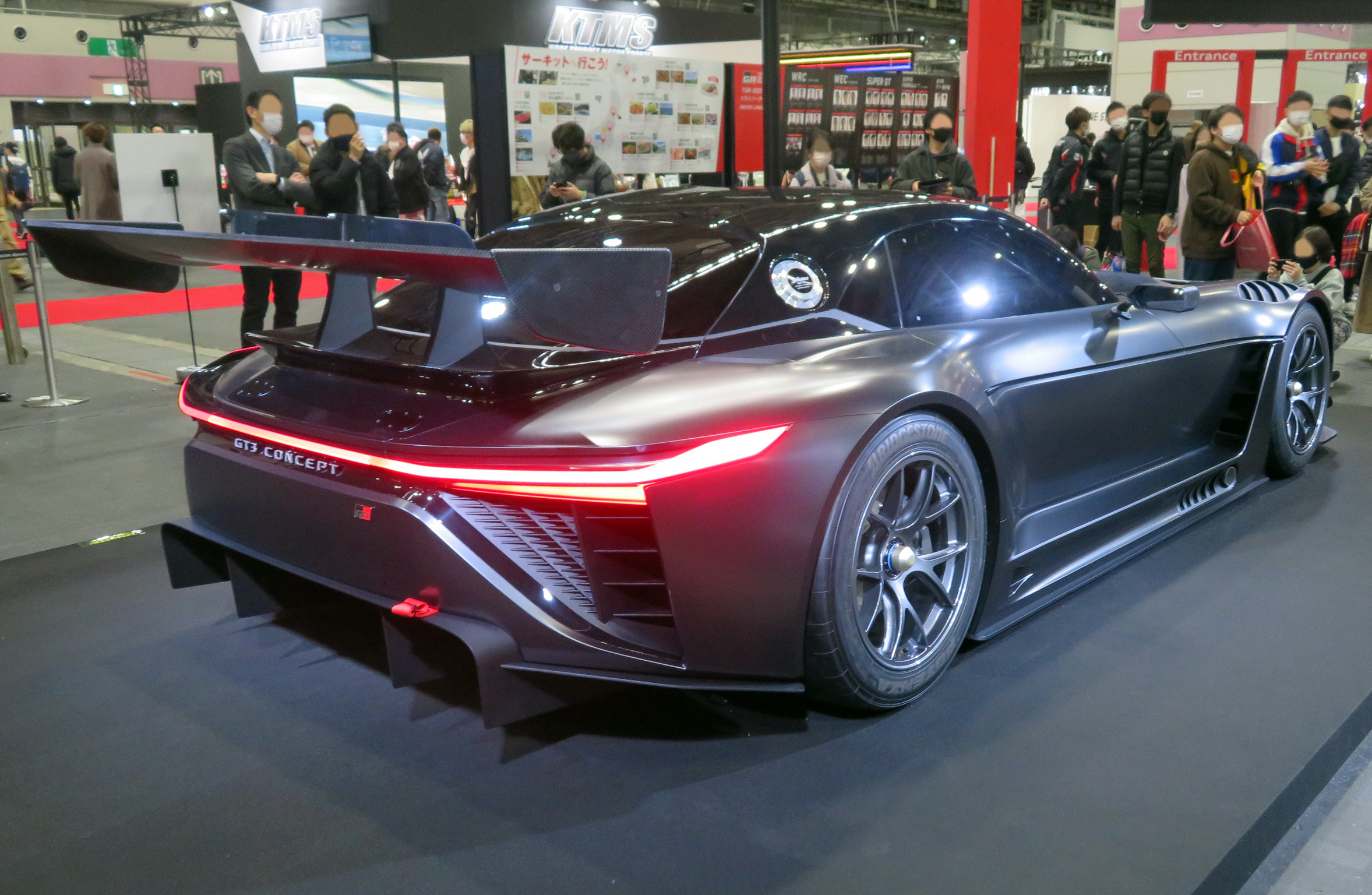
Rear view

== bZ4X GR Sport Concept (2022) ==
Toyota bZ4X GR Sport Concept
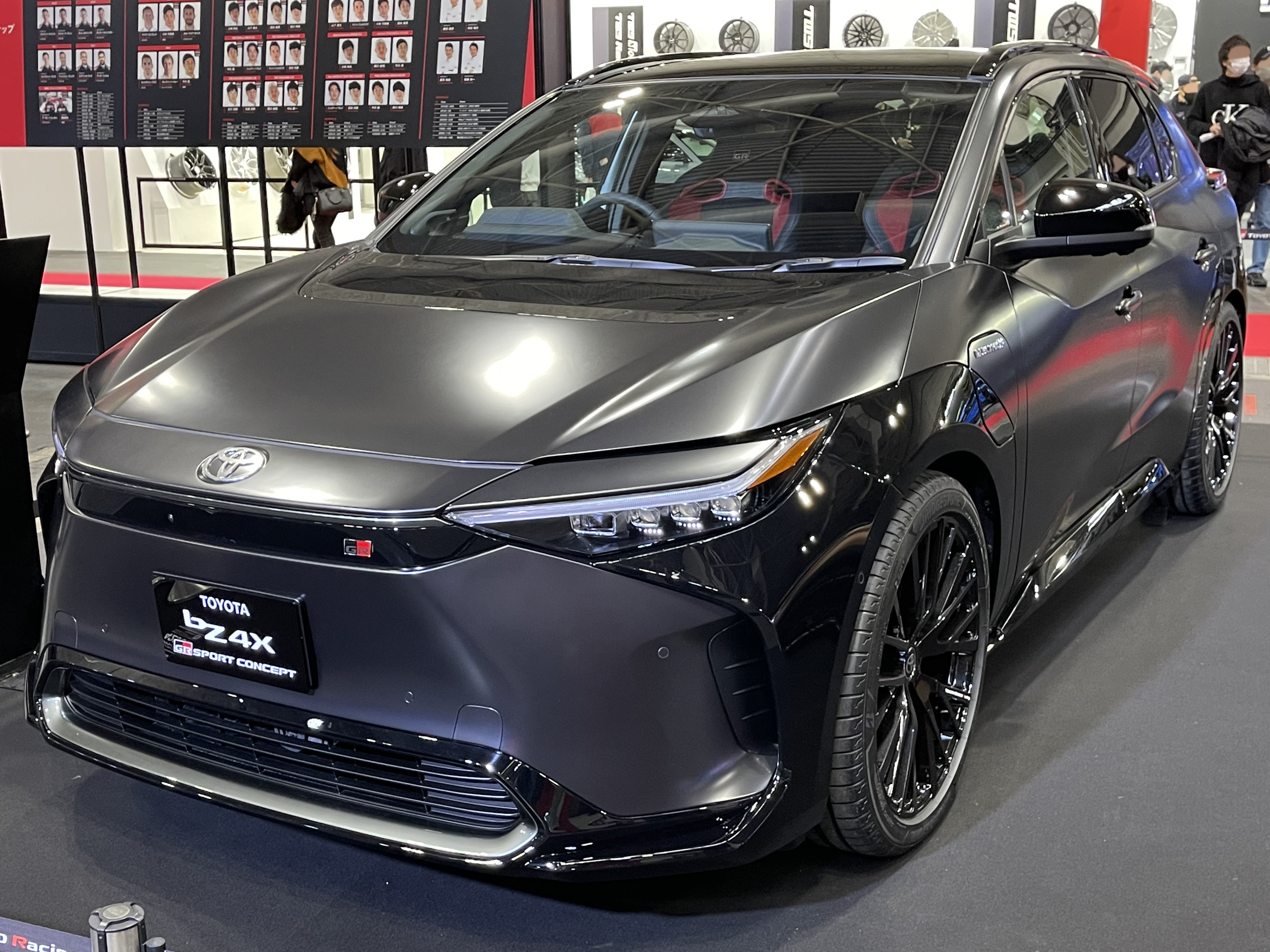

Overview
- Manufacturer: Toyota
- Production: 2022

Body and chassis
- Class: Compact crossover SUV
- Body style: 5-door SUV
- Platform: e-TNGA
- Related: Toyota bZ4X

Dimensions
- Wheelbase: 2,850 mm (112.2 in)

The bZ4X GR Sport Concept is a tuned version of the bZ4X that was shown at the January 2022 Tokyo Auto Salon.

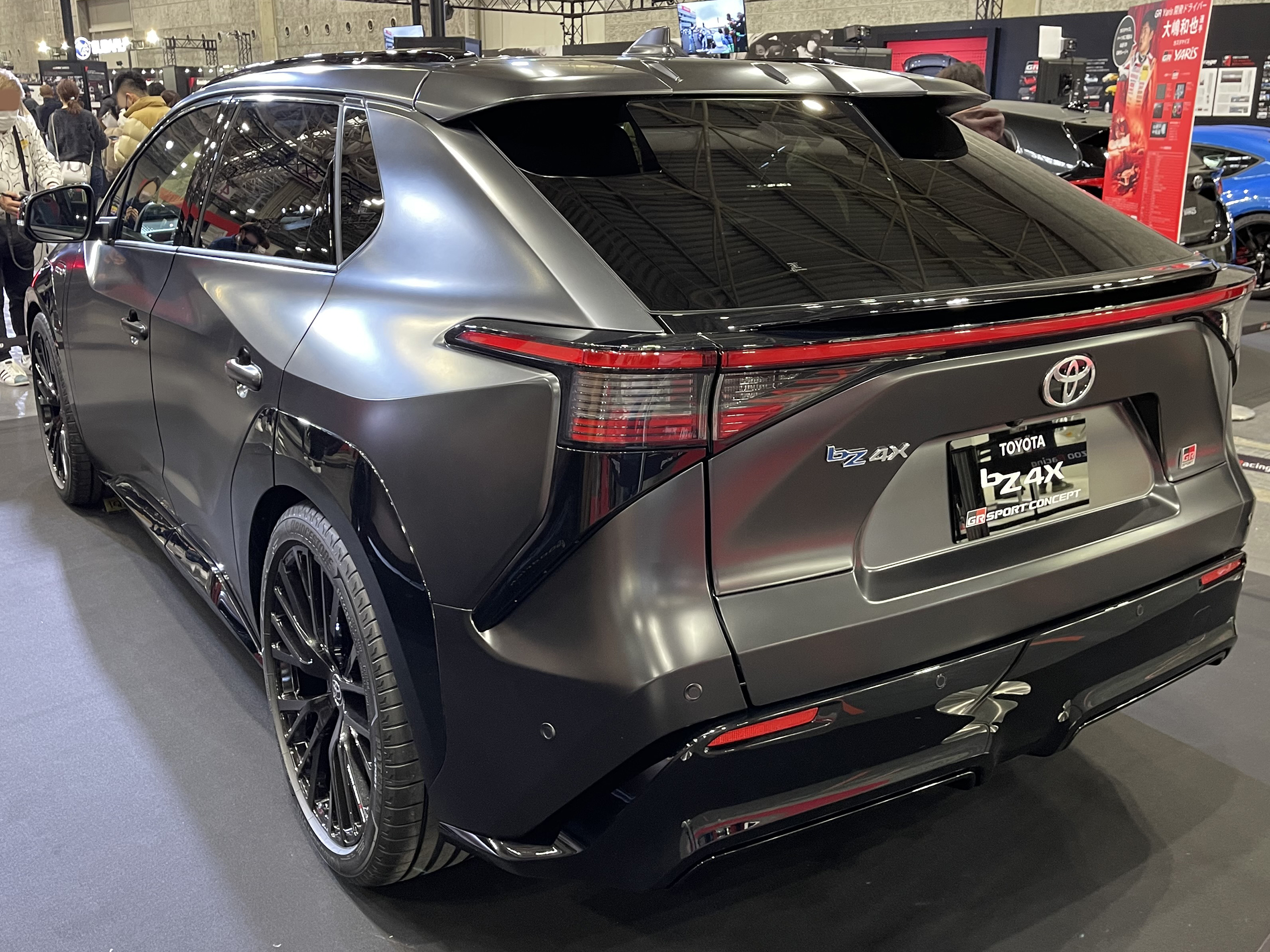
Rear view

== Kijang Innova EV Concept (2022) ==
Toyota Kijang Innova EV Concept
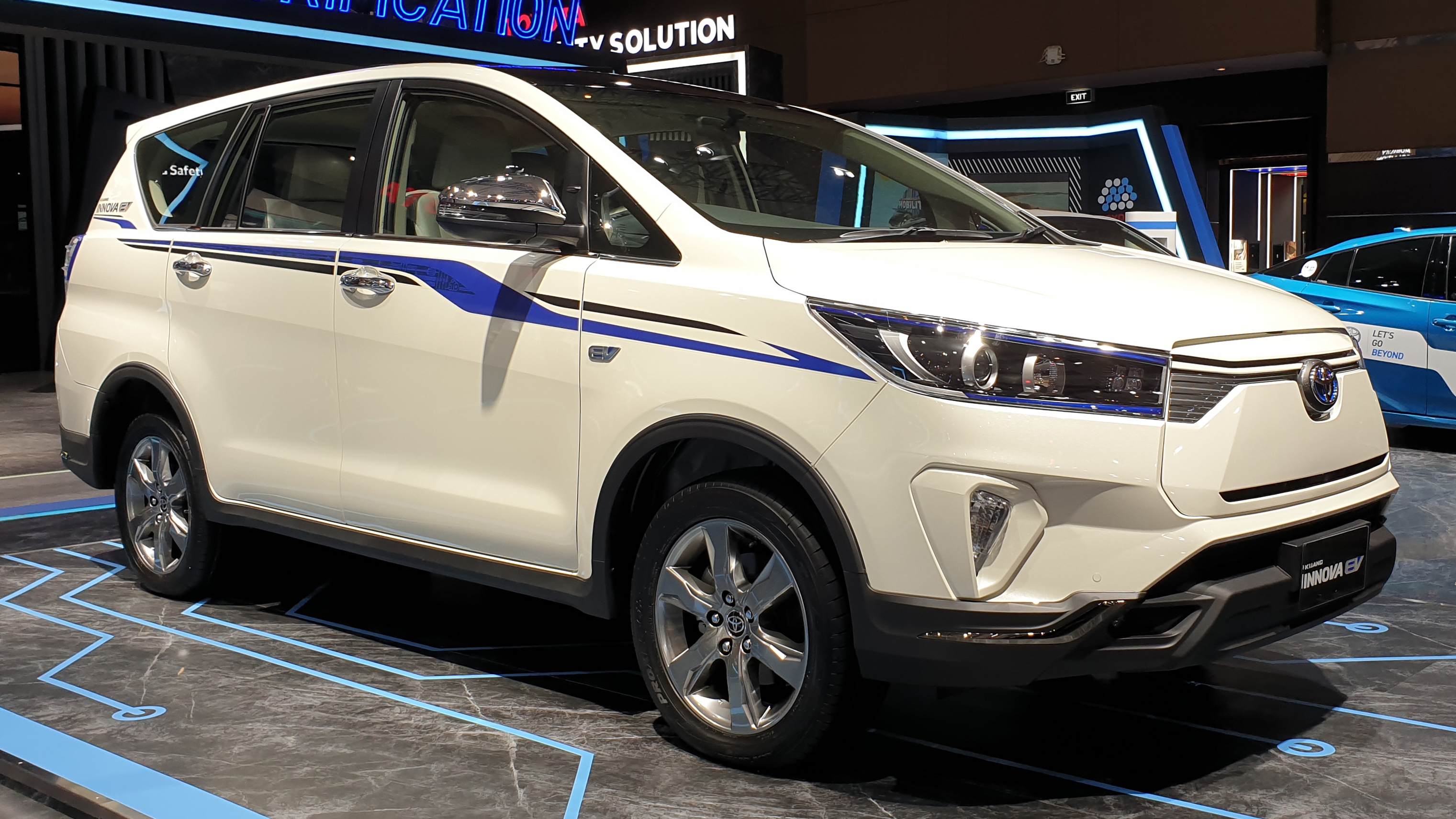

Overview
- Manufacturer: Toyota
- Production: March 2022

Body and chassis
- Class: Mid-size MPV
- Body style: 5-door wagon
- Layout: Front-motor, rear-wheel-drive
- Platform: Toyota IMV platform
- Related: Toyota Kijang Innova (AN140)

Powertrain
- Electric motor: 134 kW (180 hp; 182 PS)
- Battery: 58.9 kWh lithium-ion
- Range: 280 km (175 miles)

Dimensions
- Wheelbase: 2,750 mm (108.3 in)
- Length: 4,735 mm (186.4 in)
- Width: 1,830 mm (72.0 in)
- Height: 1,795 mm (70.7 in)

The Kijang Innova EV Concept is an EV conversion prototype based on the second-generation Kijang Innova that was first presented on 31 March 2022 in Indonesia. The conversion was done by the Australian branch of SEA Electric, a company specialising in electric trucks conversion based in Melbourne, Australia. Five prototypes were built; three in Melbourne and two in Indonesia.

The storage battery uses a 58.9 kWh lithium-ion unit with an estimated range of 280 km (175 miles). The electric motor is rated at 134 kW (180 hp; 182 PS) and could generate up to 700 N⋅m (520 lb⋅ft) of torque. The claimed top speed is 120 km/h (75 mph).

== Corolla Cross H2 Concept (2022) ==
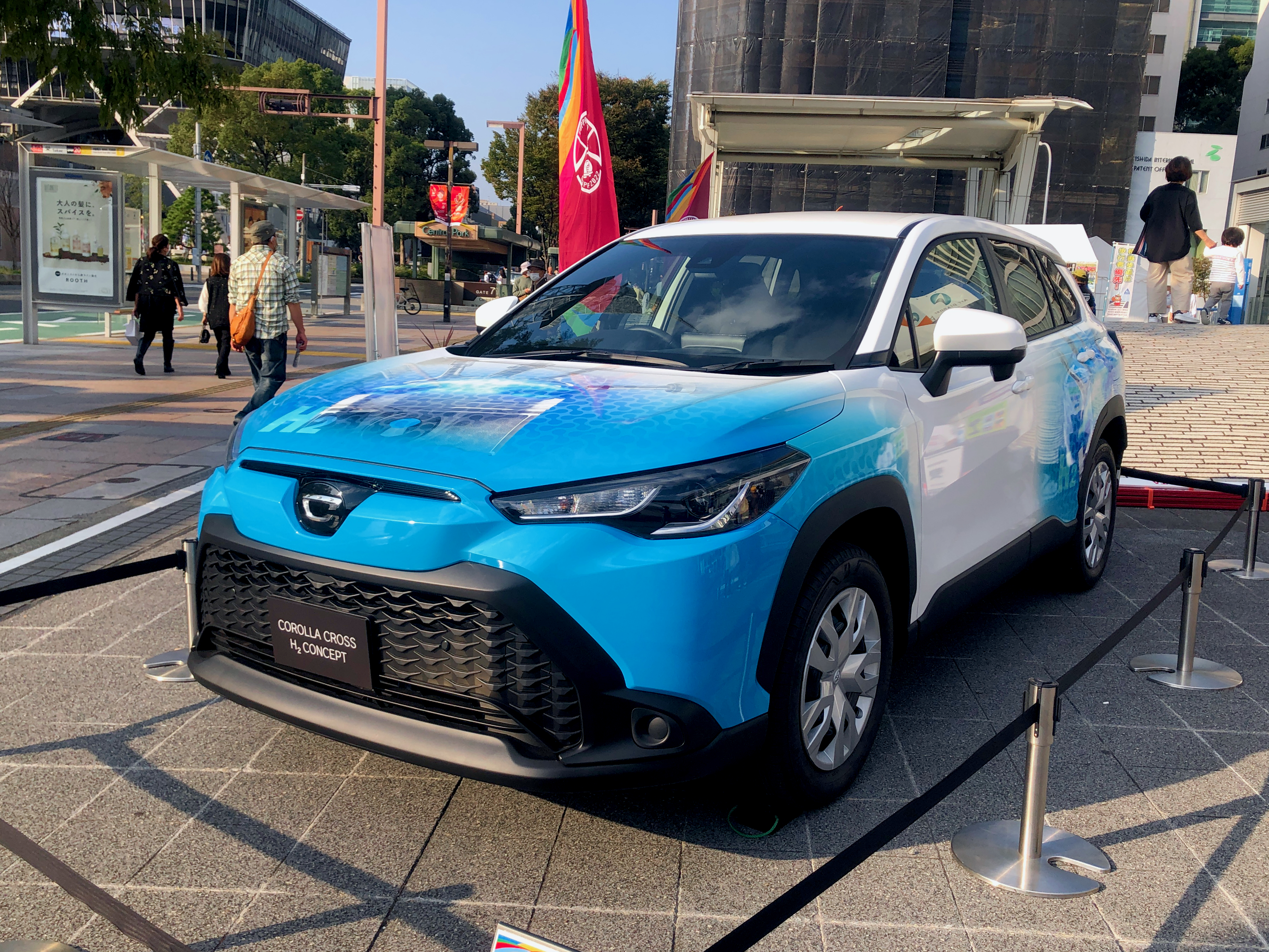
Corolla Cross H2 Concept

The Corolla Cross H2 Concept is a Corolla Cross fitted with a modified G16E-GTS engine to run with hydrogen fuel.

== C-HR prologue (2022) ==
The C-HR prologue was unveiled in December 2022 by Toyota Motor Europe. It previewed the production second-generation C-HR which was released in 2023.

== IMV 0 (2022) ==
Toyota IMV 0
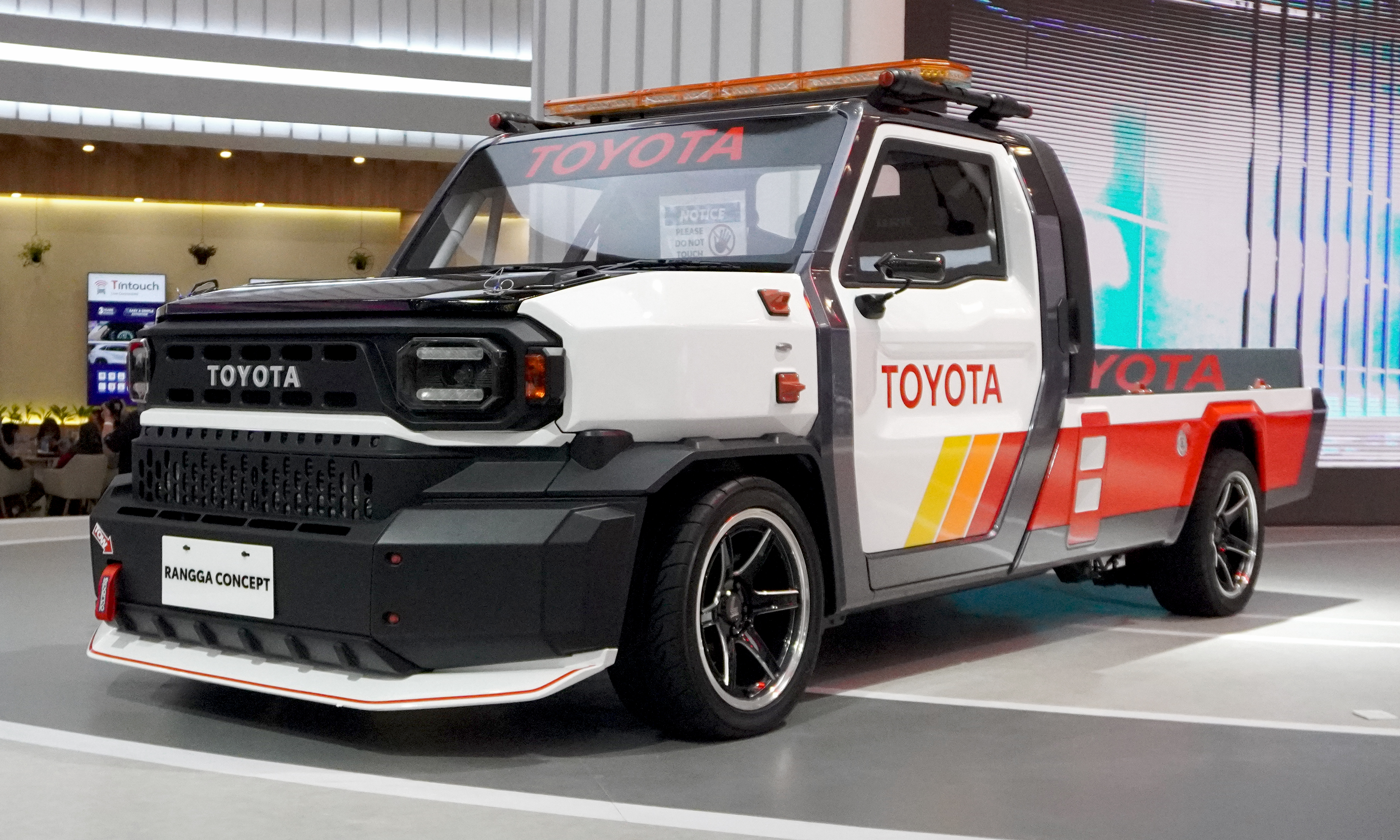
- Toyota Rangga Concept flat deck

Overview
- Manufacturer: Toyota
- Also called: Toyota Rangga Concept (Indonesia); Toyota Next Generation Tamaraw Concept (Philippines)
- Production: 2022, 2023

Body and chassis
- Class: Light commercial vehicle
- Body style: 2-door pickup; 3-door modern Jeepney (Philippines)
- Layout: Front-engine, rear-wheel-drive
- Platform: Toyota IMV
- Related: Toyota Hilux (AN110/AN120/AN130)

Dimensions
- Length: 4,965 mm (195.5 in)
- Width: 1,785 mm (70.3 in)

Chronology
- Successor: Toyota Hilux Champ

The IMV 0 is a single-cab pickup concept that was presented on 14 December 2022 at the 60th anniversary event of Toyota Motor Thailand hosted by Akio Toyoda. Based on the IMV platform, it was designed and engineered by Toyota Daihatsu Engineering & Manufacturing (TDEM) in collaboration with Japanese and Australian engineering teams.

The production version was released on 27 November 2023 in Thailand as the Toyota Hilux Champ.

=== Rangga Concept (2023) ===
The same vehicle was showcased at the 30th Gaikindo Indonesia International Auto Show in August 2023 as the Rangga Concept. The nameplate was formerly used for a variant of the Toyota Kijang in the 1990s.

=== Next Generation Tamaraw Concept (2023) ===
The IMV 0 was also showcased during Toyota Motor Philippines' 35th anniversary event on 22 August 2023 as the Next Generation Tamaraw Concept with two variants, a pick-up truck similar to the Rangga Concept flat-deck truck, and a modern Jeepney, highlighting the IMV 0's modularity.

== Hilux Revo BEV Concept (2022) ==
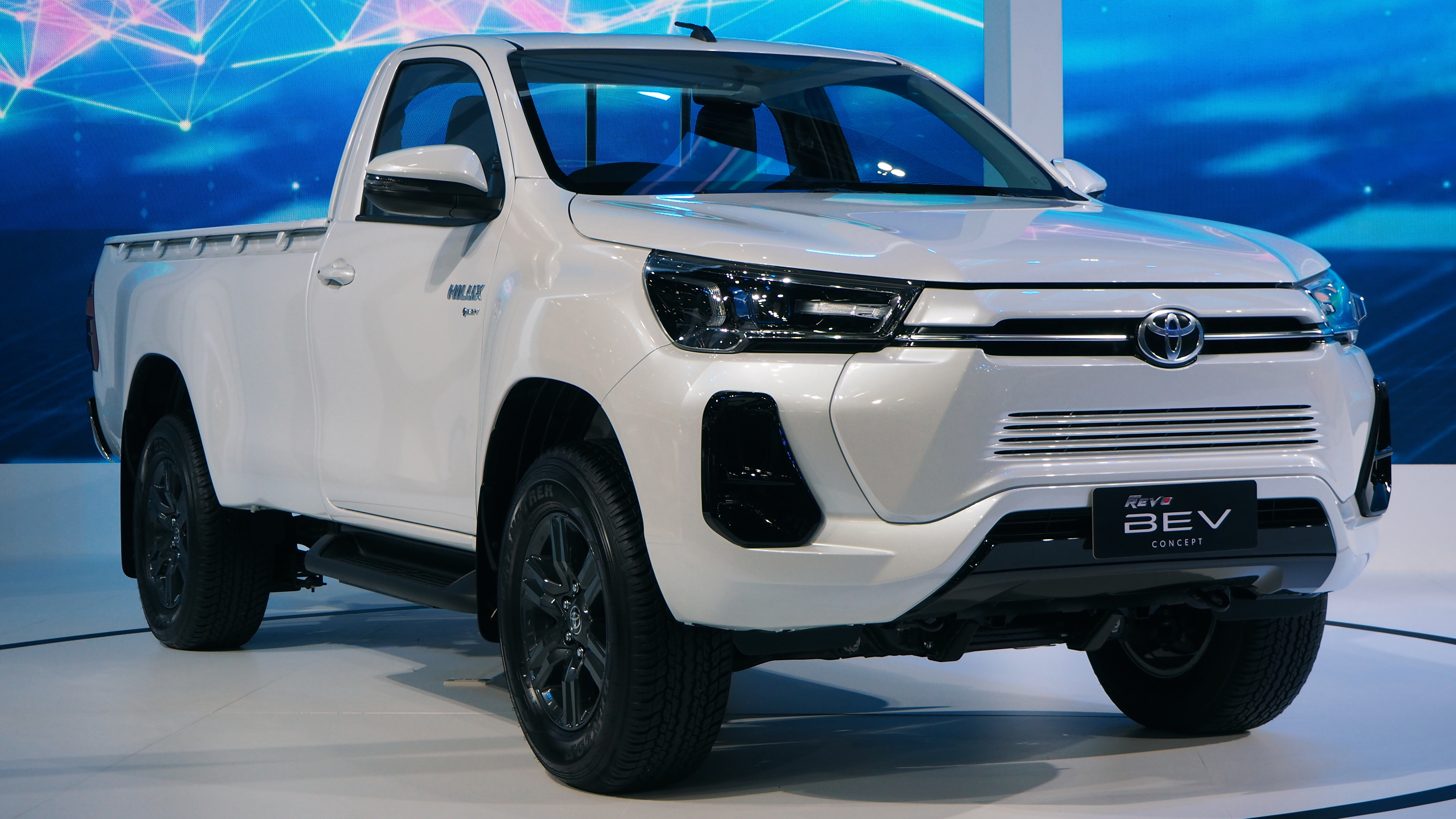
Hilux Revo BEV Concept (Thailand)

The Hilux Revo BEV Concept is an EV conversion prototype based on the eighth-generation Hilux that was presented on 14 December 2022 at the 60th anniversary event of Toyota Motor Thailand.

== bZ Compact SUV (2022) ==
Toyota bZ Compact SUV Concept

Overview
- Manufacturer: Toyota
- Production: 2023

Body and chassis
- Body style: 5-door SUV
- Related: Toyota C-HR+

Designed at Toyota European Design and Development (ED^{2}), this previews an SUV in the bZ battery electric range. The wheels are at the extreme ends of the vehicle, with minimal overhangs. The seats are made from recycled plant material.

It was shown in Brussels and at the November 2022 Los Angeles Auto Show.

It was put into production as the Toyota C-HR+.

== bZ Sport Crossover (2023) ==
Toyota bZ Sport Crossover Concept

Overview
- Manufacturer: Toyota
- Production: 2023

Body and chassis
- Body style: 5-door SUV

The bZ Sport Crossover (Chinese: 智享跨界) is one of two bZ-branded concept vehicles that are introduced at Auto Shanghai 2023. It was developed by BYD Toyota EV Technology, FAW Toyota Motor, and Toyota Motor Engineering & Manufacturing China (TMEC). The near-production version of the bZ Sport Crossover was released as bZ5 in Auto China 2024. The production model was released in Shanghai Motor Show in April 2025, and was renamed to bZ5.

=== Sport Crossover Concept (2023) ===
The same vehicle was showcased at the Toyota Motor Europe’s Kenshiki forum in Brussels on 4 December 2023 as Sport Crossover Concept.

== bZ FlexSpace (2023) ==
Toyota bZ FlexSpace Concept

Overview
- Manufacturer: Toyota
- Production: 2023

Body and chassis
- Body style: 5-door SUV

The bZ FlexSpace (Chinese: 悦动空间) is one of two bZ-branded concept vehicles that are introduced at Auto Shanghai 2023. Similar to the bZ Sport Crossover, it was developed by BYD Toyota EV Technology, FAW Toyota Motor, and Toyota Motor Engineering & Manufacturing China (TMEC). It was also shown in Auto Guangzhou 2023. The production version of the bZ FlexSpace was released as the bZ3X in Auto China 2024.

== EPU Concept (2023) ==
Toyota EPU Concept
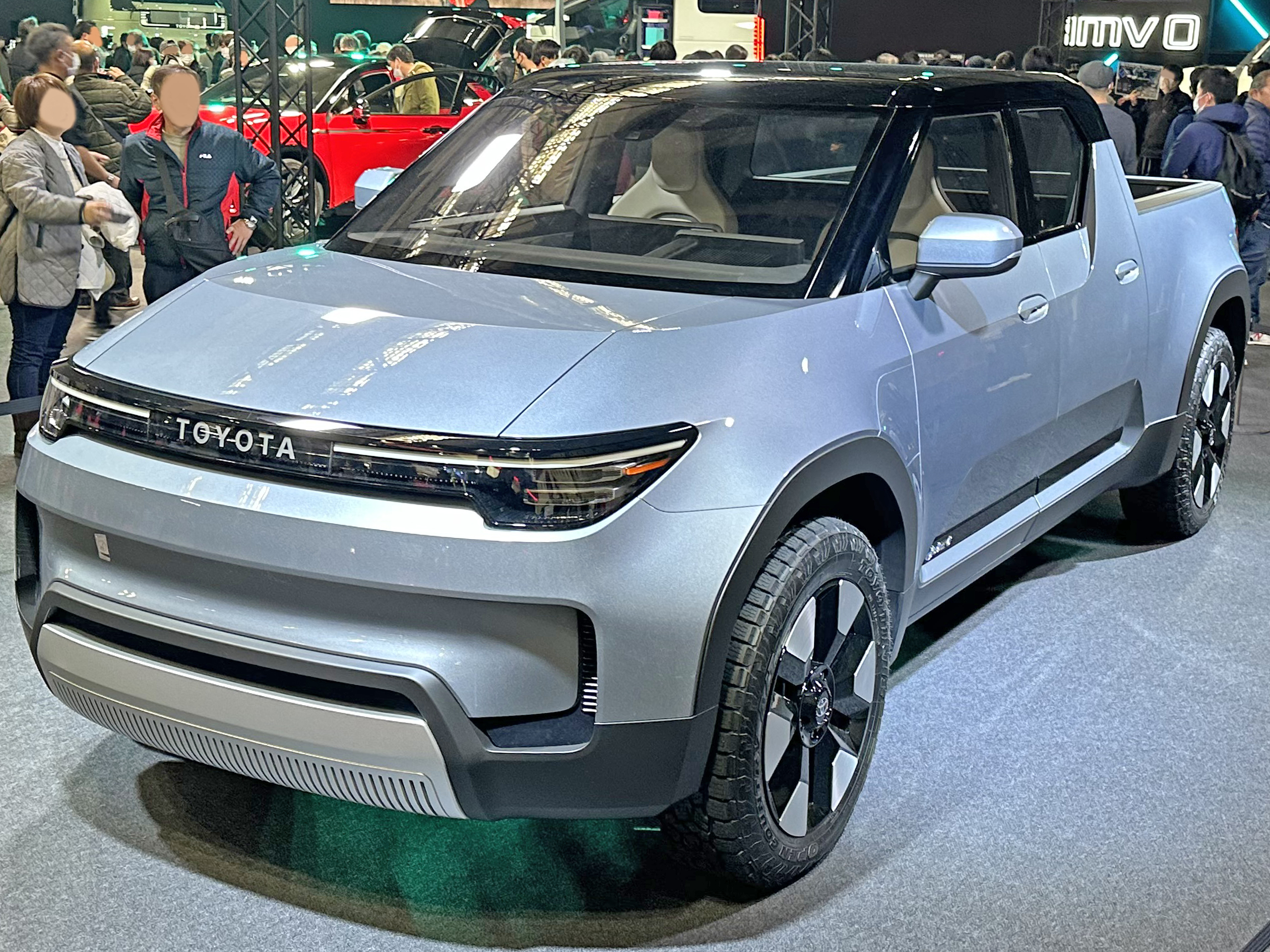

Overview
- Manufacturer: Toyota
- Production: 2023

Body and chassis
- Body style: 4-door pickup truck

The Toyota EPU Concept (2023) is an electric pickup truck unveiled at the Tokyo Motor Show, designed to combine compact size with utility. It features a unibody construction and aims to compete with vehicles like the Ford Maverick, offering a modern design and tech-forward interior, including a yoke-style steering wheel and large digital displays .

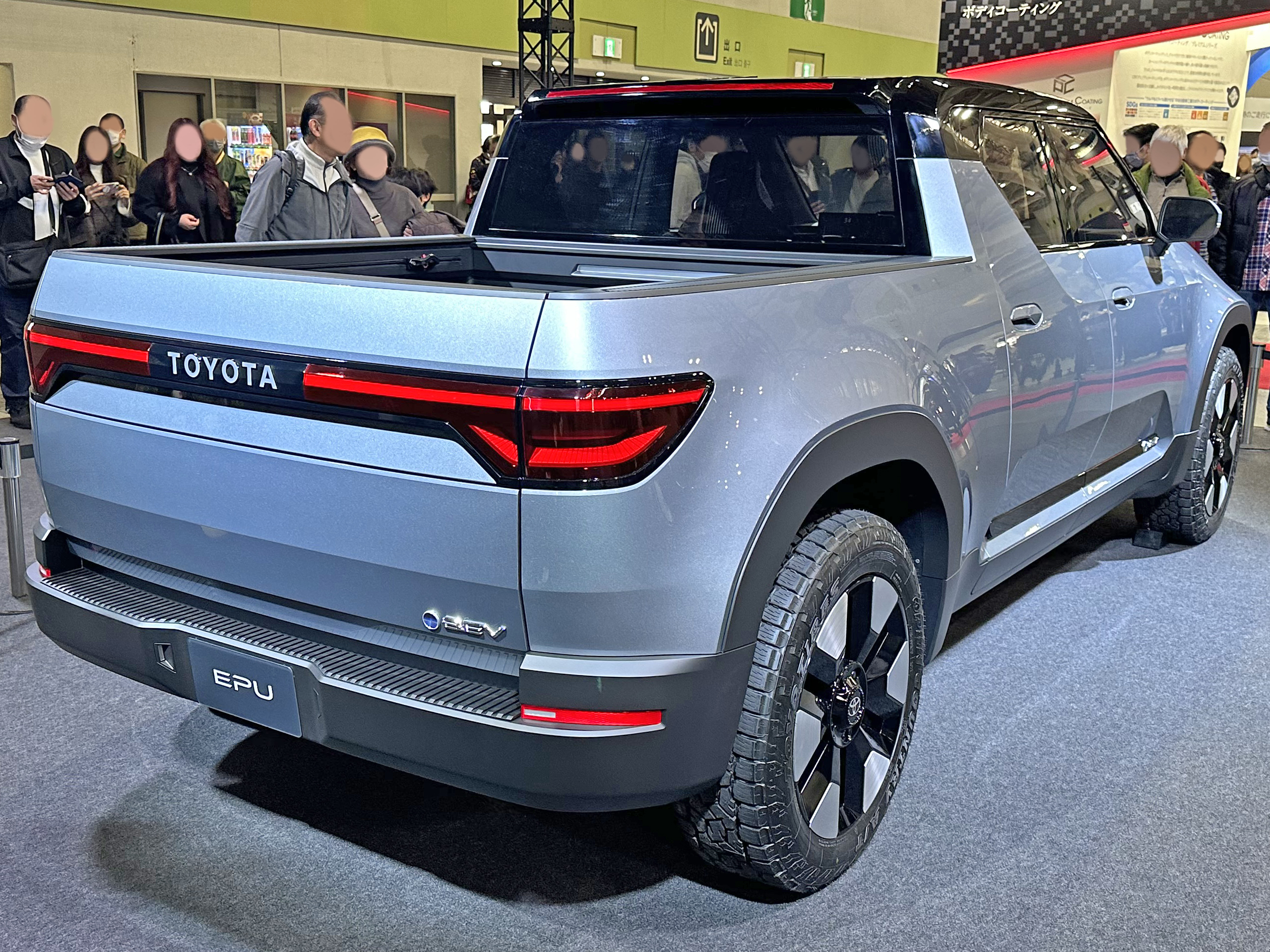
Rear view

== JUU (2023) ==
Toyota JUU
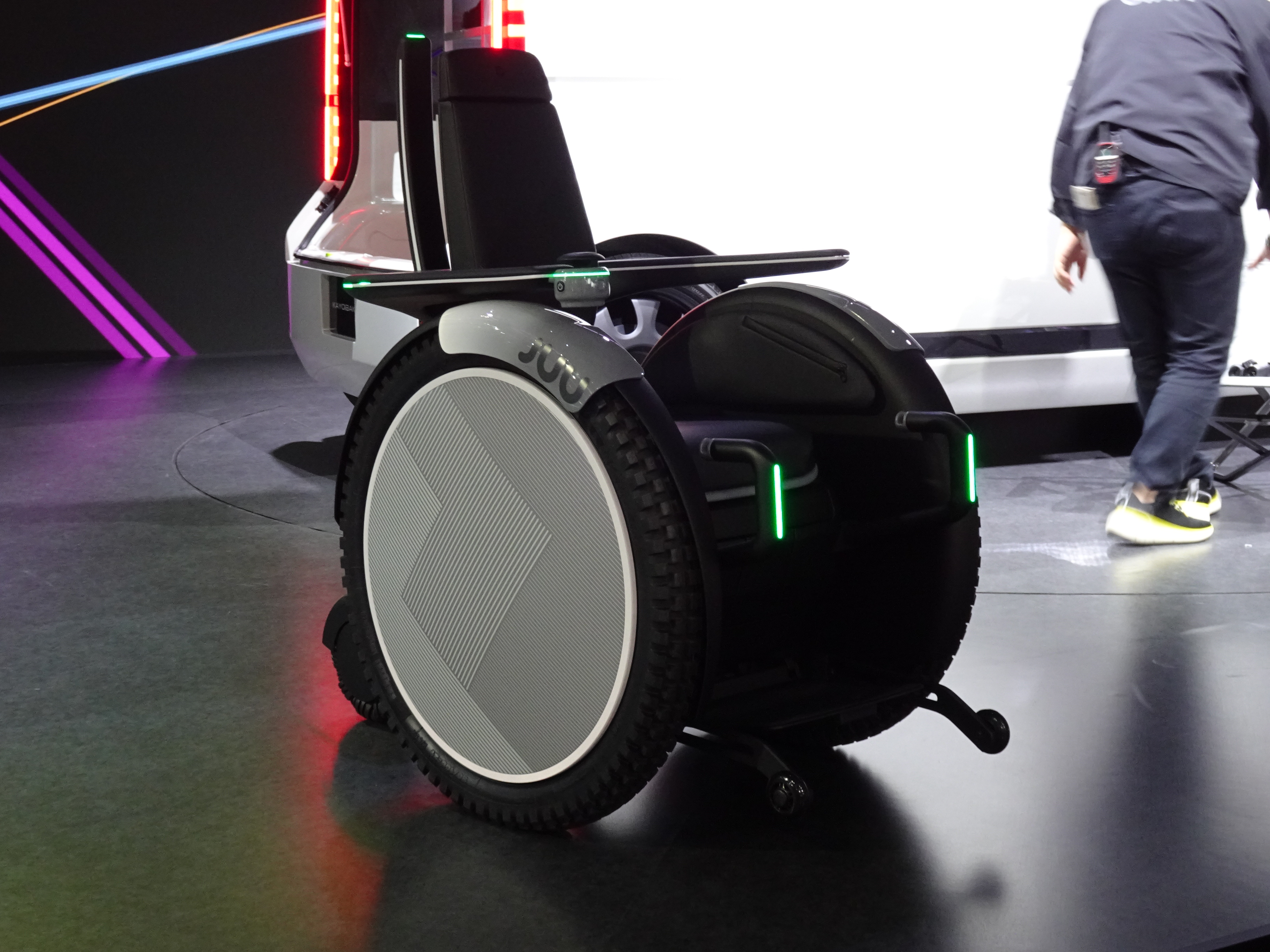

Overview
- Manufacturer: Toyota
- Production: 2023

Body and chassis
- Class: wheelchair

The JUU is a wheelchair that can go up and down stairs. It uses car electric motors.

== Land Hopper (2023) ==
Toyota Land Hopper
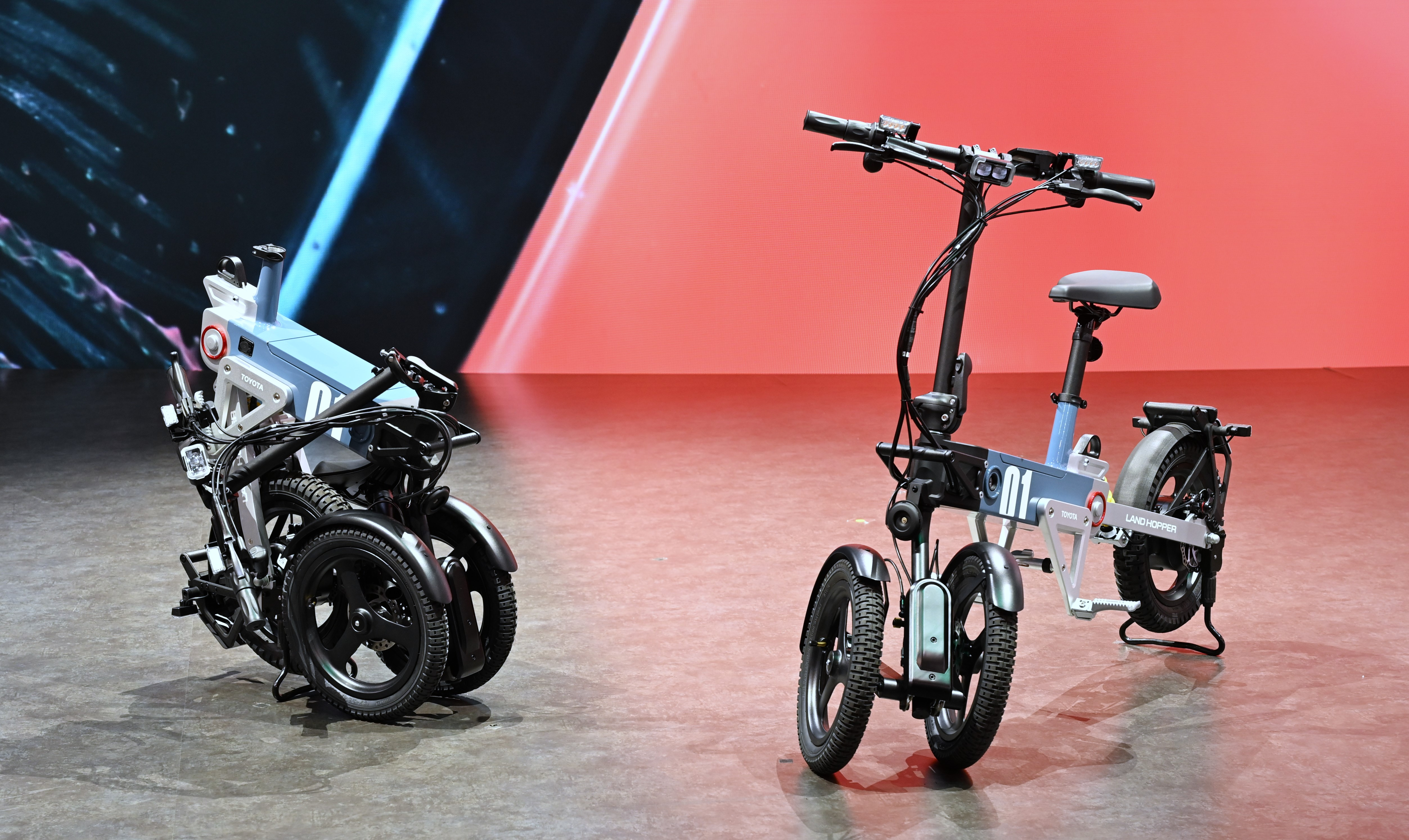

Overview
- Manufacturer: Toyota
- Production: 2023

Body and chassis
- Class: Electric mobility scooter

The Land Hopper is a three-wheeled mobility device with two front wheels connected to a bicycle style handlebar, a bicycle style seat and a single rear wheel. It folds up for storage.

== Space mobility (2023) ==
Toyota Space mobility

Overview
- Manufacturer: Toyota
- Production: 2023

Body and chassis
- Class: moon buggy

The Space mobility is a buggy designed for use on the moon.

== NEO Steer (2023) ==
Toyota NEO Steer

Overview
- Manufacturer: Toyota
- Production: 2023

The NEO Steer explored the use of a motor cycle style handlebar that included the accelerator and brake controls.

== FT-3e Concept (2023) ==
Toyota FT-3e Concept
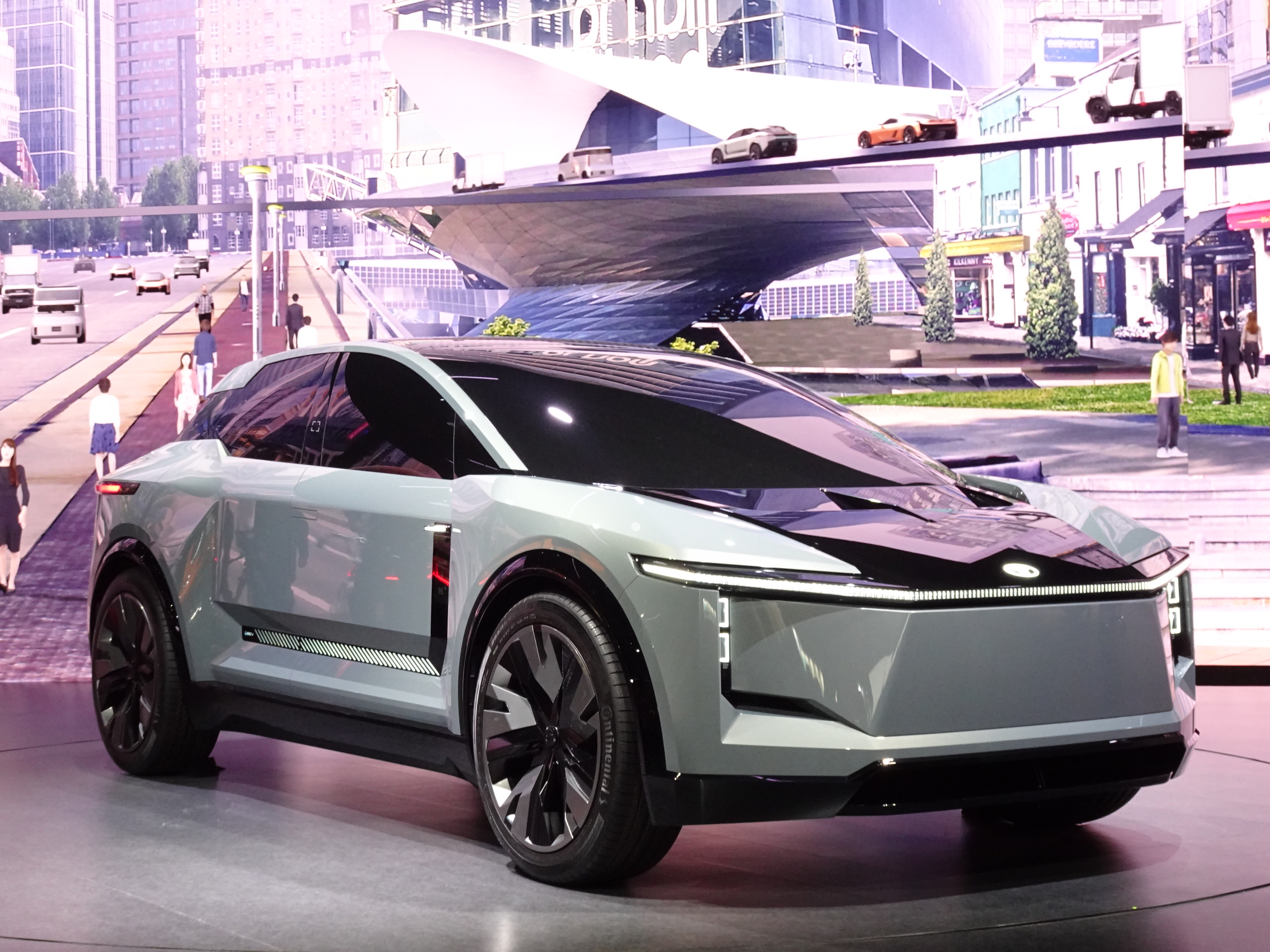

Overview
- Manufacturer: Toyota
- Production: 2023

Body and chassis
- Body style: 5-door SUV

The Toyota FT-3e is an electric SUV concept car. It was shown at the Kuala Lumpur International Mobility Show in December 2024. Featuring a minimalist aerodynamic design, advanced BEV architecture, and unique door-mounted digital displays, it emphasizes efficiency, connectivity, and user convenience.

== FT-Se Concept (2023) ==
Toyota FT-Se Concept
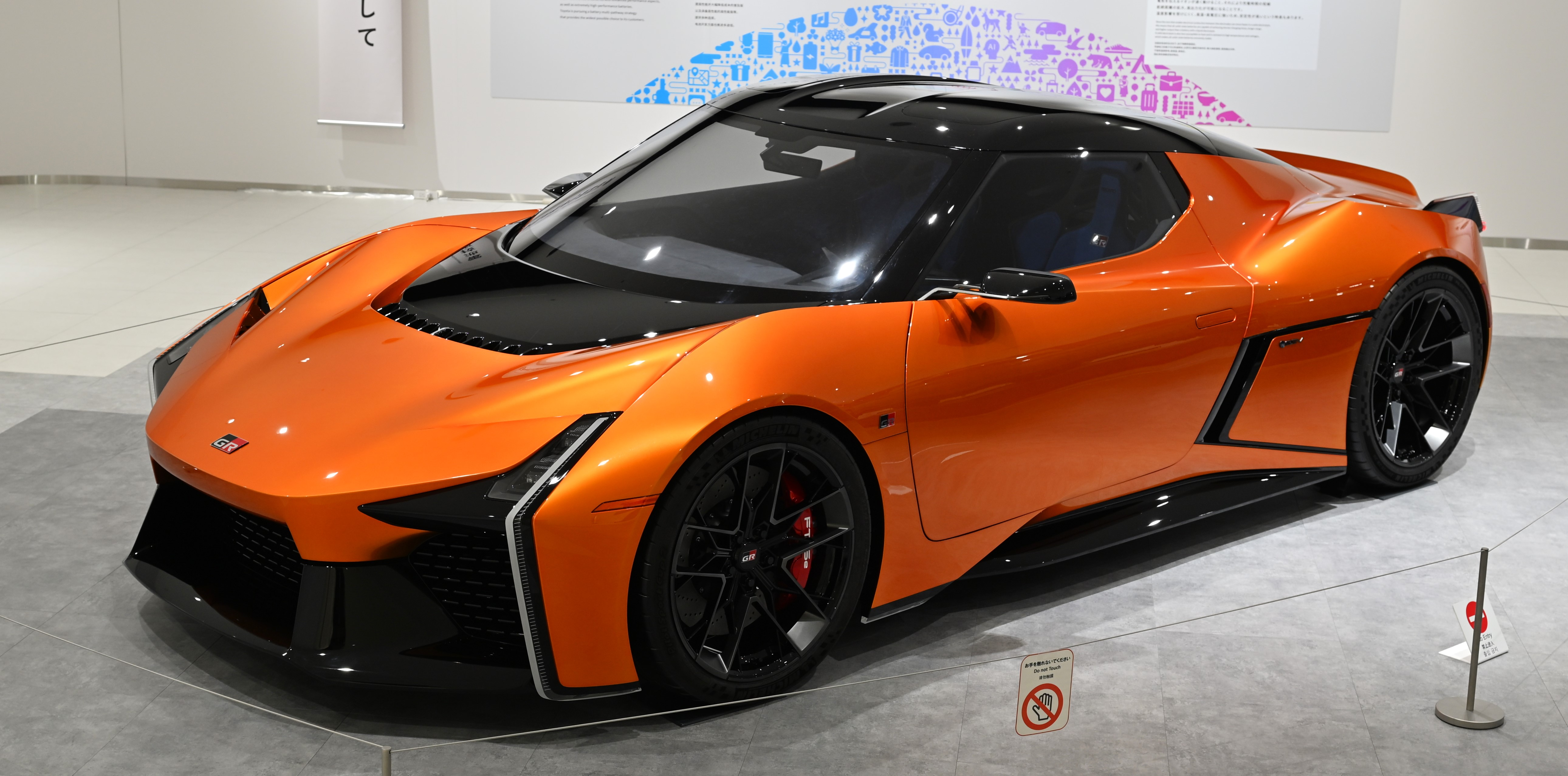

Overview
- Manufacturer: Toyota
- Production: 2023

Body and chassis
- Class: Sports car
- Body style: 2-door coupe
- Layout: All-electric with a dual-motor, all-wheel drive (AWD) system

Toyota FT-Se Concept is a high-performance, battery electric two-seater sports car concept unveiled in 2023.

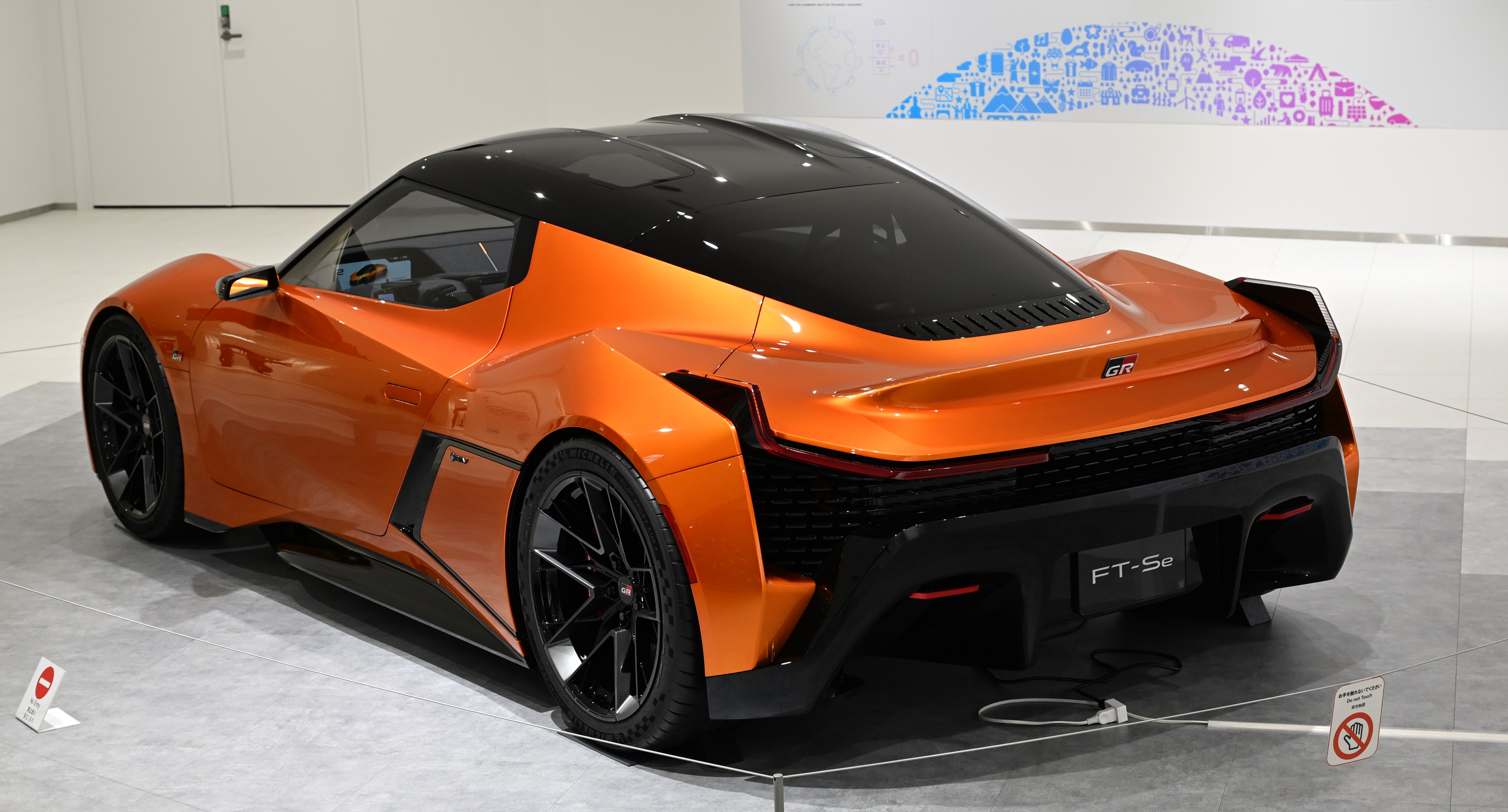
Rear view

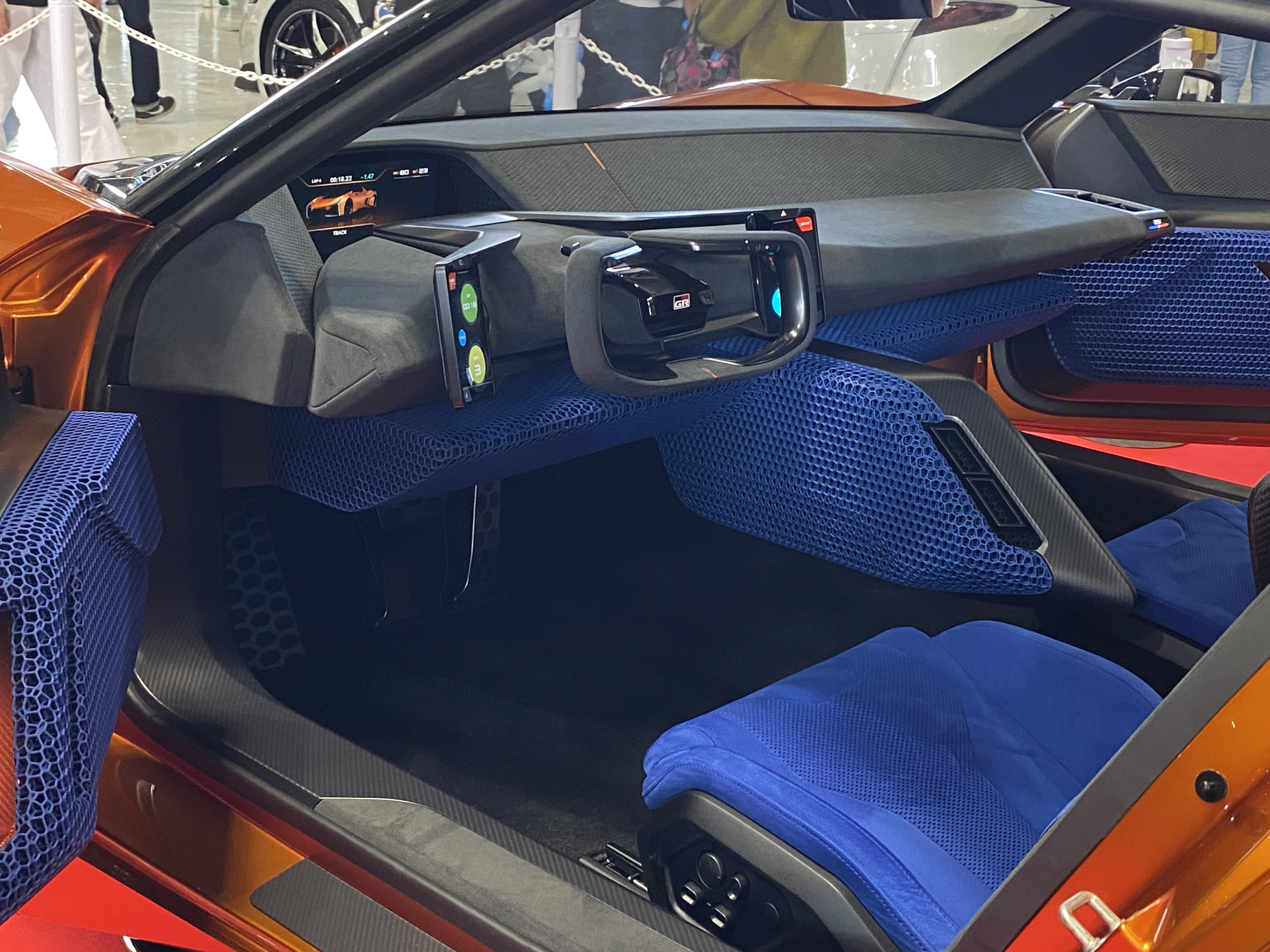
Interior

== Land Cruiser Se concept car (2023) ==
Toyota Land Cruiser Se concept car
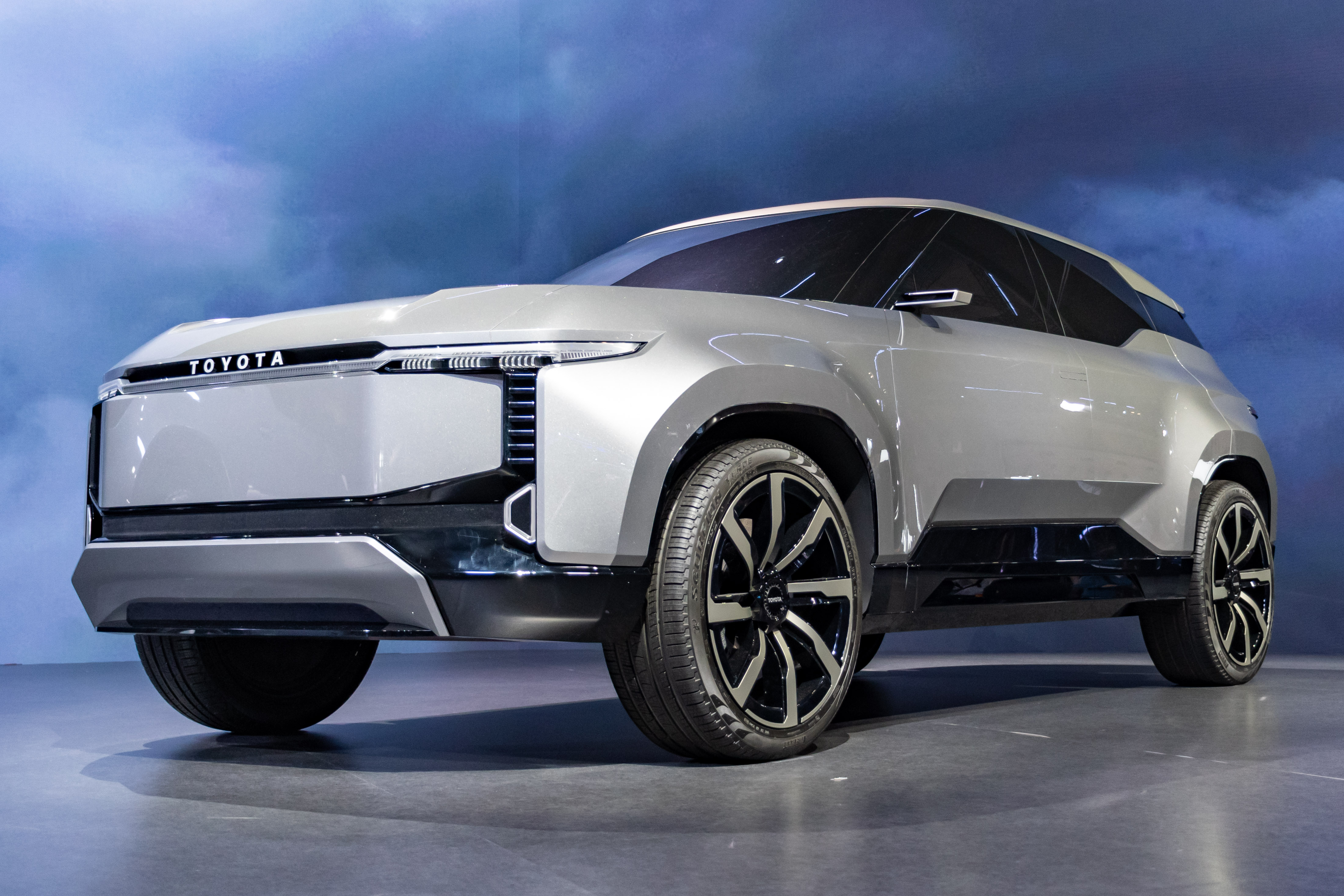

Overview
- Manufacturer: Toyota
- Production: 2023

Body and chassis
- Body style: 5-door SUV

The Land Cruiser Se is a monocoque-based three-row battery electric concept SUV using the Land Cruiser nameplate showcased at the 2023 Japan Mobility Show.

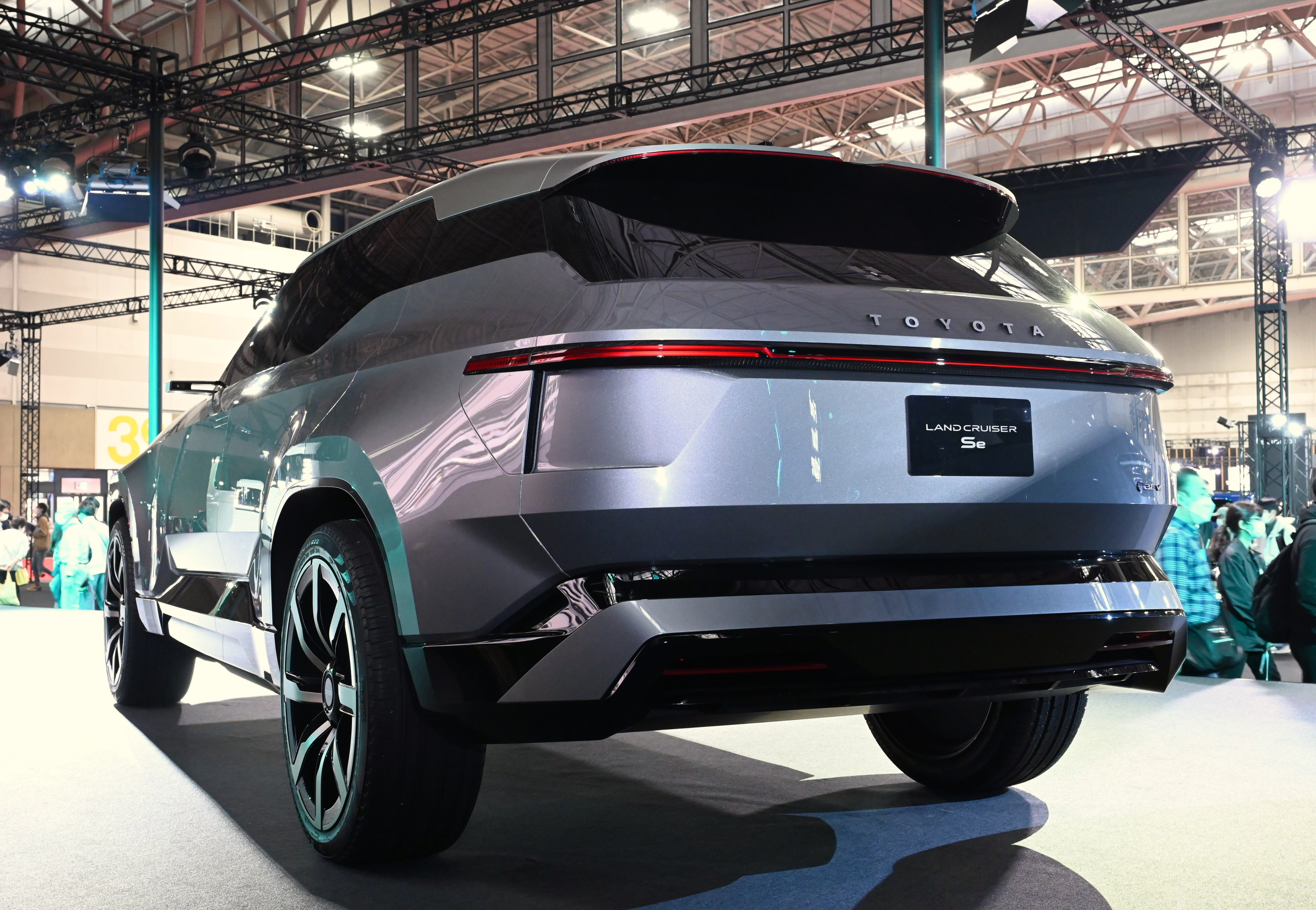
Rear view

== Toyota Tacoma X-Runner 2023 Concept (2023) ==
Concept based on the 2024 model year Tacoma using the Tundra engine, drivetrain, suspension and many custom trim parts.

== bZ Satisfied Space (2023) ==
bZ Satisfied Space
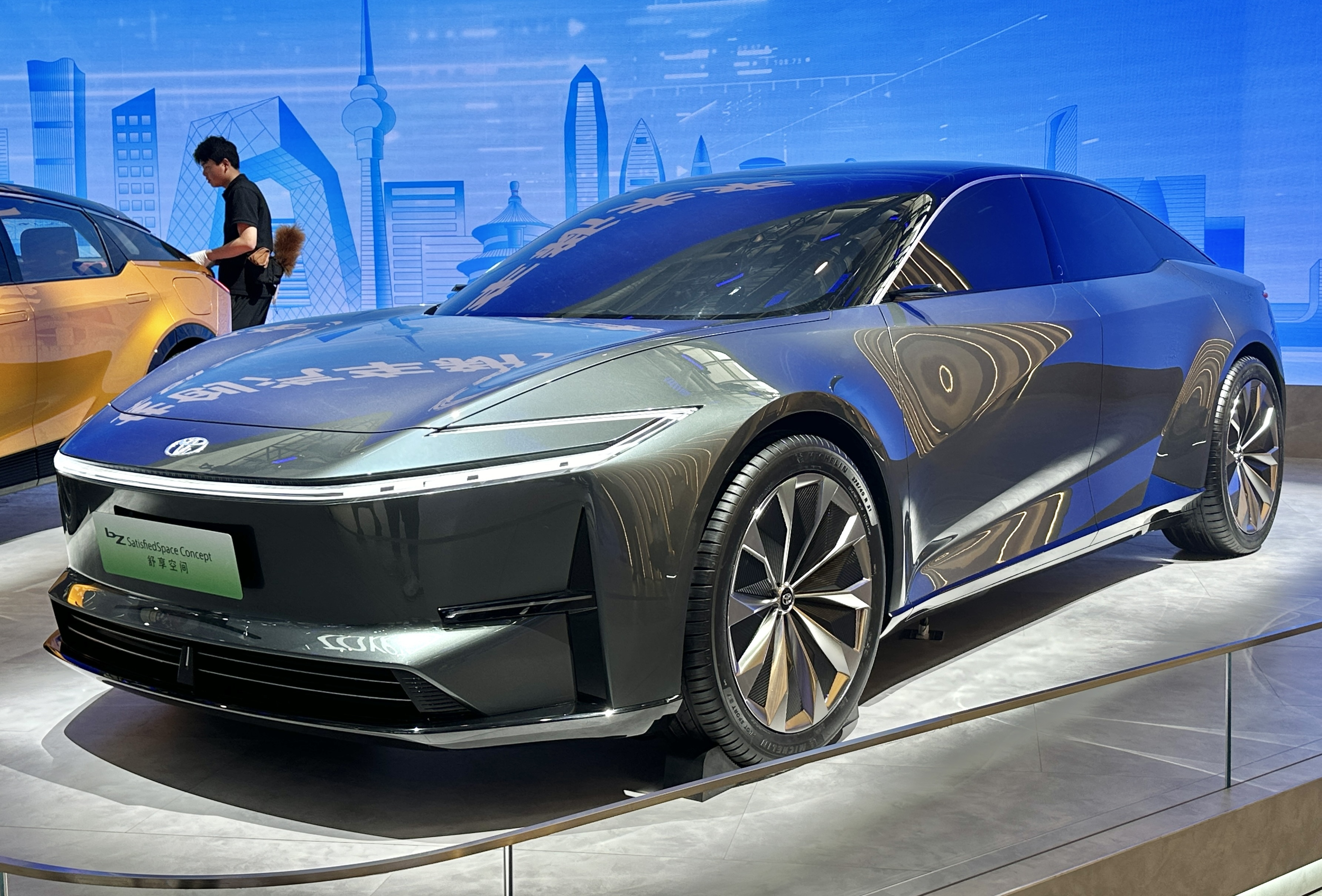

Overview
- Manufacturer: GAC Toyota
- Also called: Toyota bZ7 Concept
- Production: 2023

Body and chassis
- Body style: 4-door sedan

Chronology
- Successor: Toyota bZ7

The bZ Satisfied Space (Chinese: 舒享空间) is battery electric concept sedan that was showcased at Auto Guangzhou 2023. It was developed by GAC Toyota. Its design was inspired by the bZ Sport Crossover Concept.

The model was also shown in Auto China 2024 in Beijing. In November 2024, it was reshown in a different color as the bZ7 Concept in 2024 Guangzhou Auto Show, before the production version was revealed in April 2025.

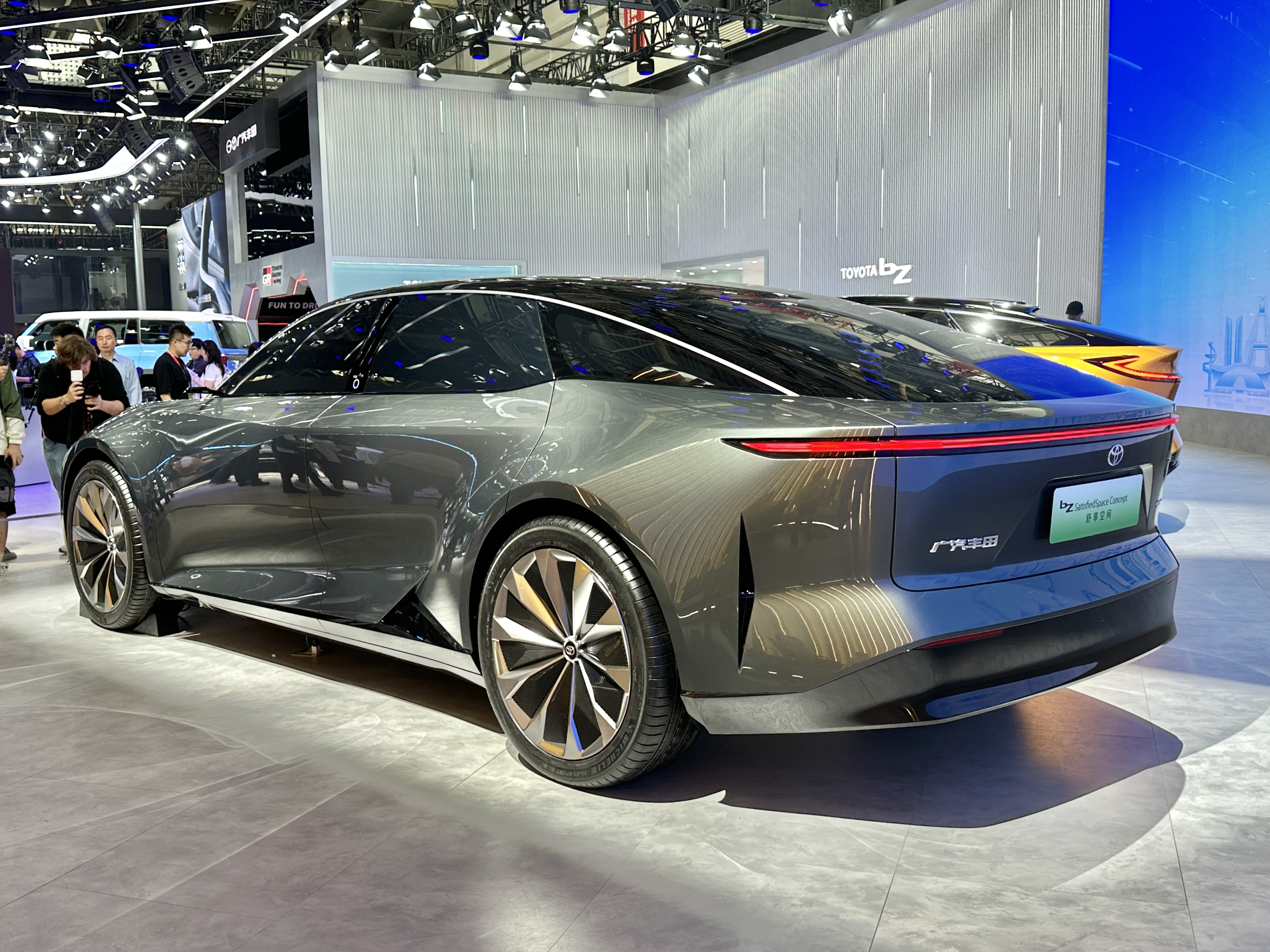
Rear view

== Kayoibako (2023) ==
Kayoibako
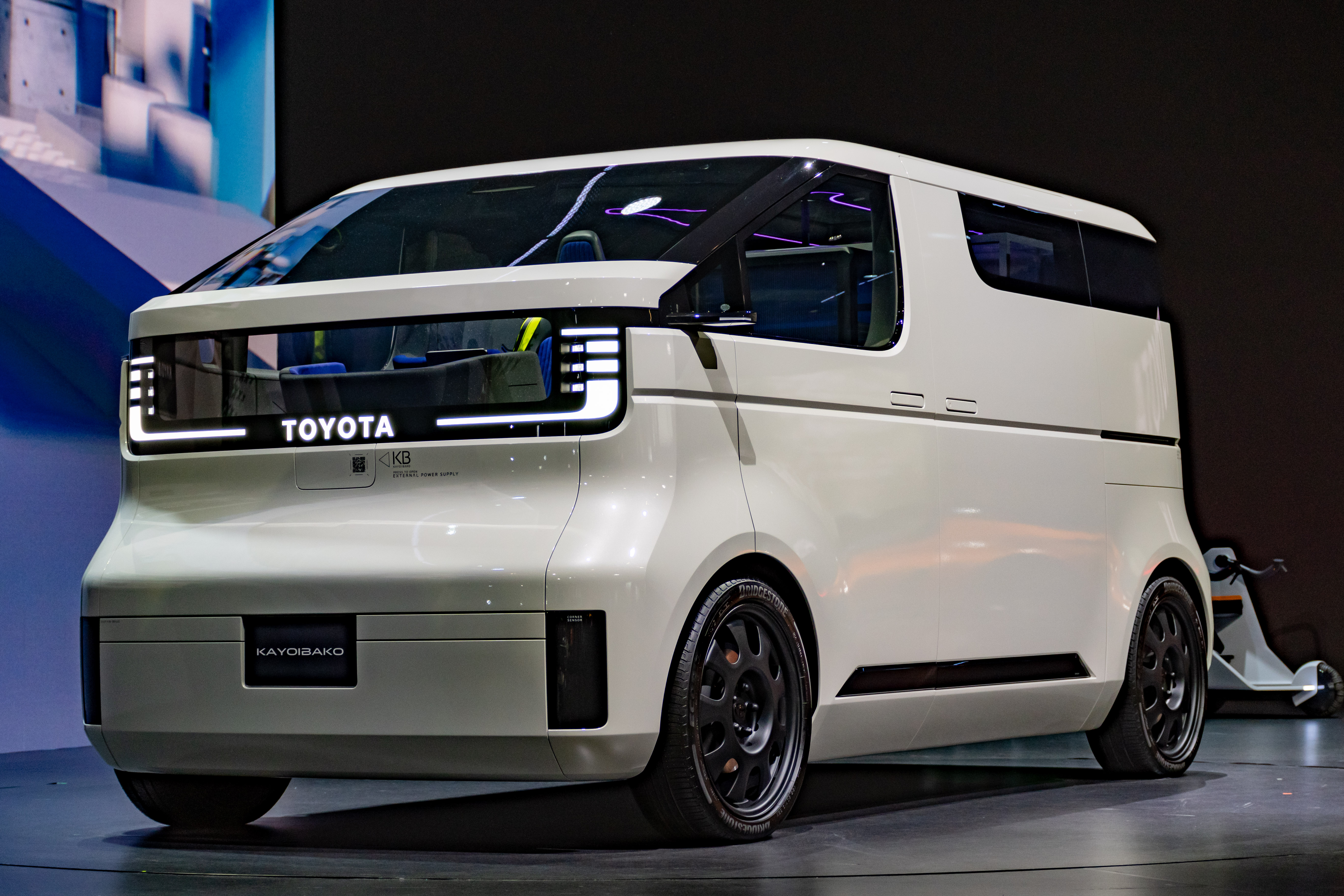

Overview
- Manufacturer: Toyota
- Production: 2023

Body and chassis
- Body style: Van

The Kayoibako is an EV van based on the same platform used for the FT-3e and FT-Se. The name refers to the Japanese name for delivery boxes. There is no B-pillar between the passenger door and the sliding cargo door. Two versions were shown at the 2023 Japan Mobility Show. One was set up for a wheelchair driver and the other was set up up a 3-row camper MPV.

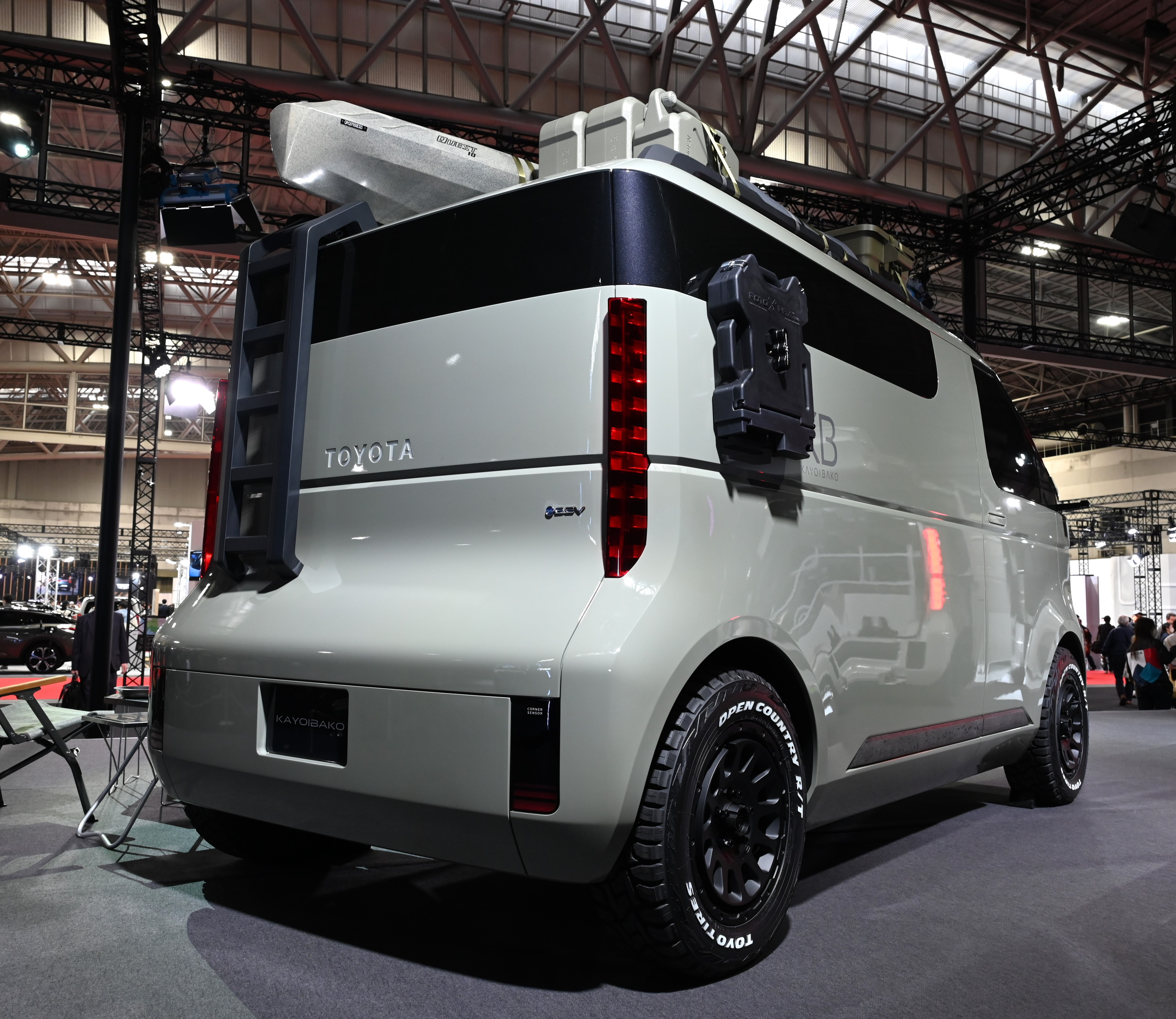
Rear view

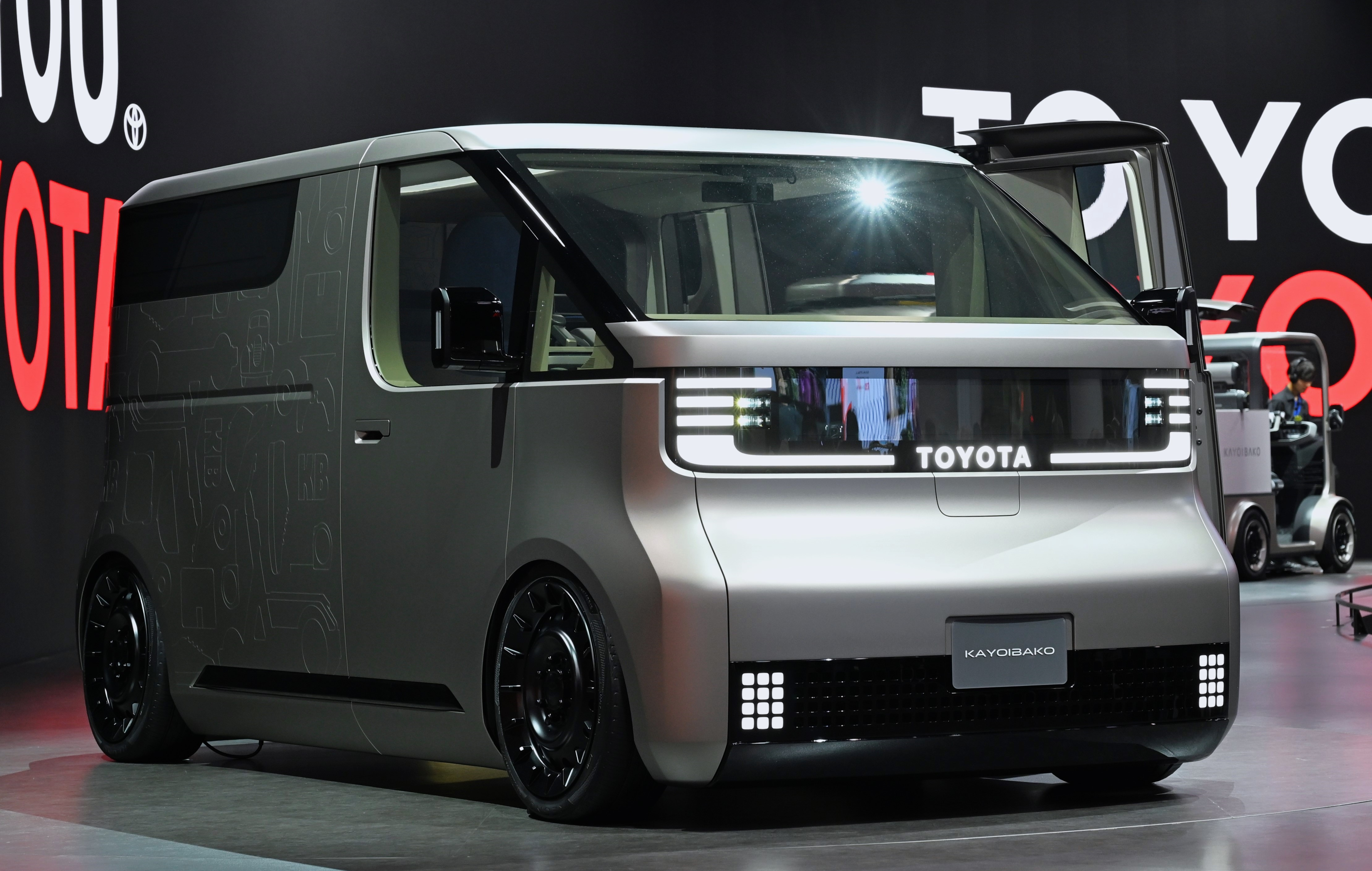
2025 Kayoibako

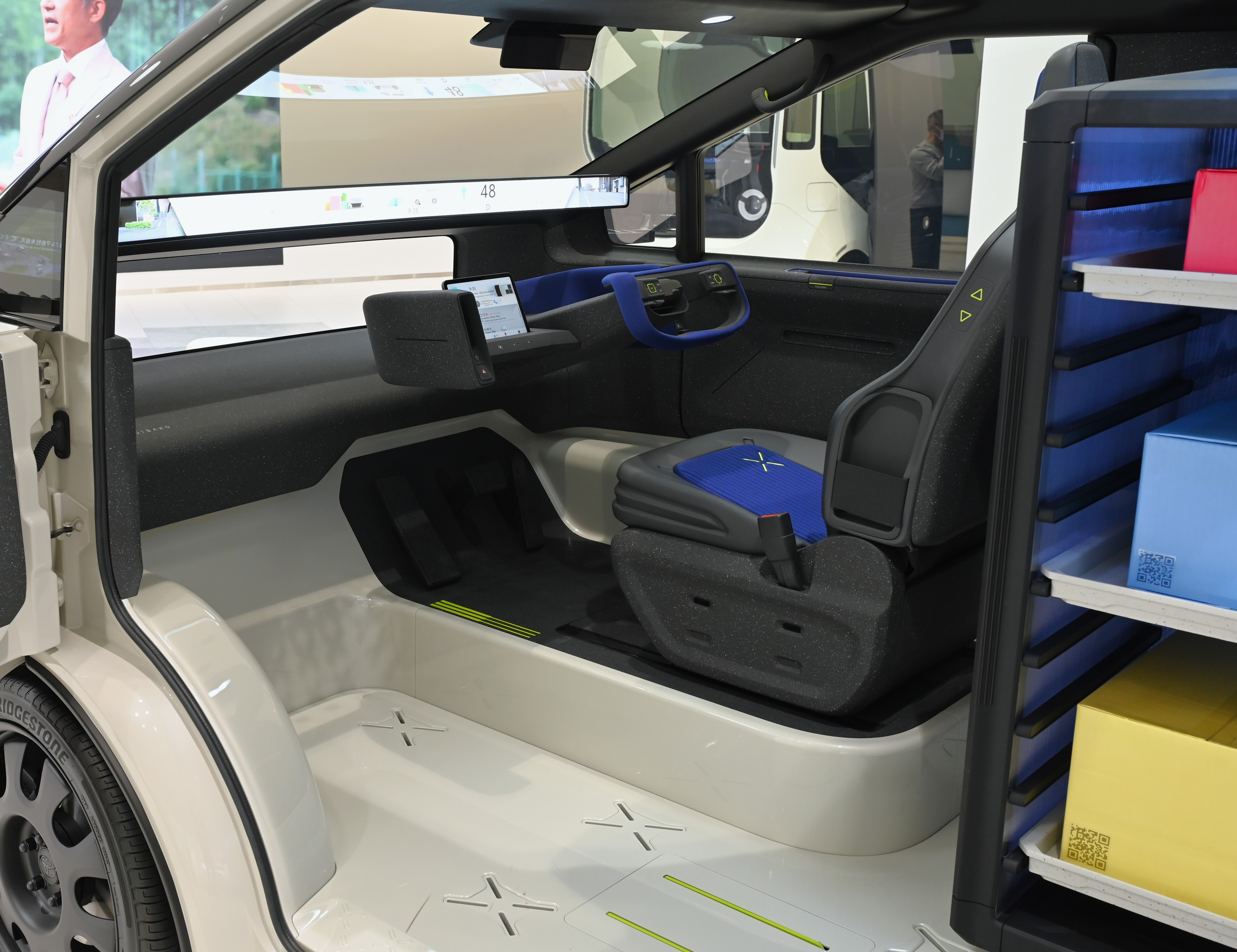
Interior

== Global HiAce BEV Concept (2023) ==
Global HiAce BEV Concept

Overview
- Manufacturer: Toyota Auto Body
- Production: 2023

Body and chassis
- Body style: Van

The Global HiAce BEV Concept is an EV delivery van based on the long-wheelbase Toyota HiAce (H300) van.

== X-Van Gear Concept (2023) ==
X-Van Gear Concept

Overview
- Manufacturer: Toyota Auto Body
- Production: 2023

Body and chassis
- Body style: Van

Dimensions
- Length: 4,695 mm (184.8 in)
- Width: 1,820 mm (72 in)
- Height: 1,855 mm (73.0 in)

The X-Van Gear Concept (pronounced as cross-van) is a van built by Toyota Auto Body. The rear doors slide backwards like in normal cargo vans. However, the front doors swing out parallel to the body.

== Urban SUV Concept (2023) ==
Urban SUV Concept

Overview
- Manufacturer: Toyota
- Production: 2023

Body and chassis
- Class: Subcompact crossover SUV
- Body style: 5-door SUV
- Platform: Heartect-e
- Related: Suzuki eVX

Dimensions
- Length: 4,300 mm (170 in)
- Width: 1,820 mm (72 in)
- Height: 1,620 mm (64 in)

Chronology
- Successor: Toyota Urban Cruiser (BEV)

The Urban SUV Concept is a battery electric B-segment SUV concept showcased by Toyota Motor Europe in December 2023. It previews a battery electric SUV that will be unveiled in the first half of 2024. It resembles the eVX concept from Suzuki, suggesting the vehicle will be jointly produced by Toyota and Suzuki. The production version of the Urban SUV Concept was introduced as the Toyota Urban Cruiser on 12 December 2024.

== GR H2 Racing Concept (2023) ==
GR H2 Racing Concept
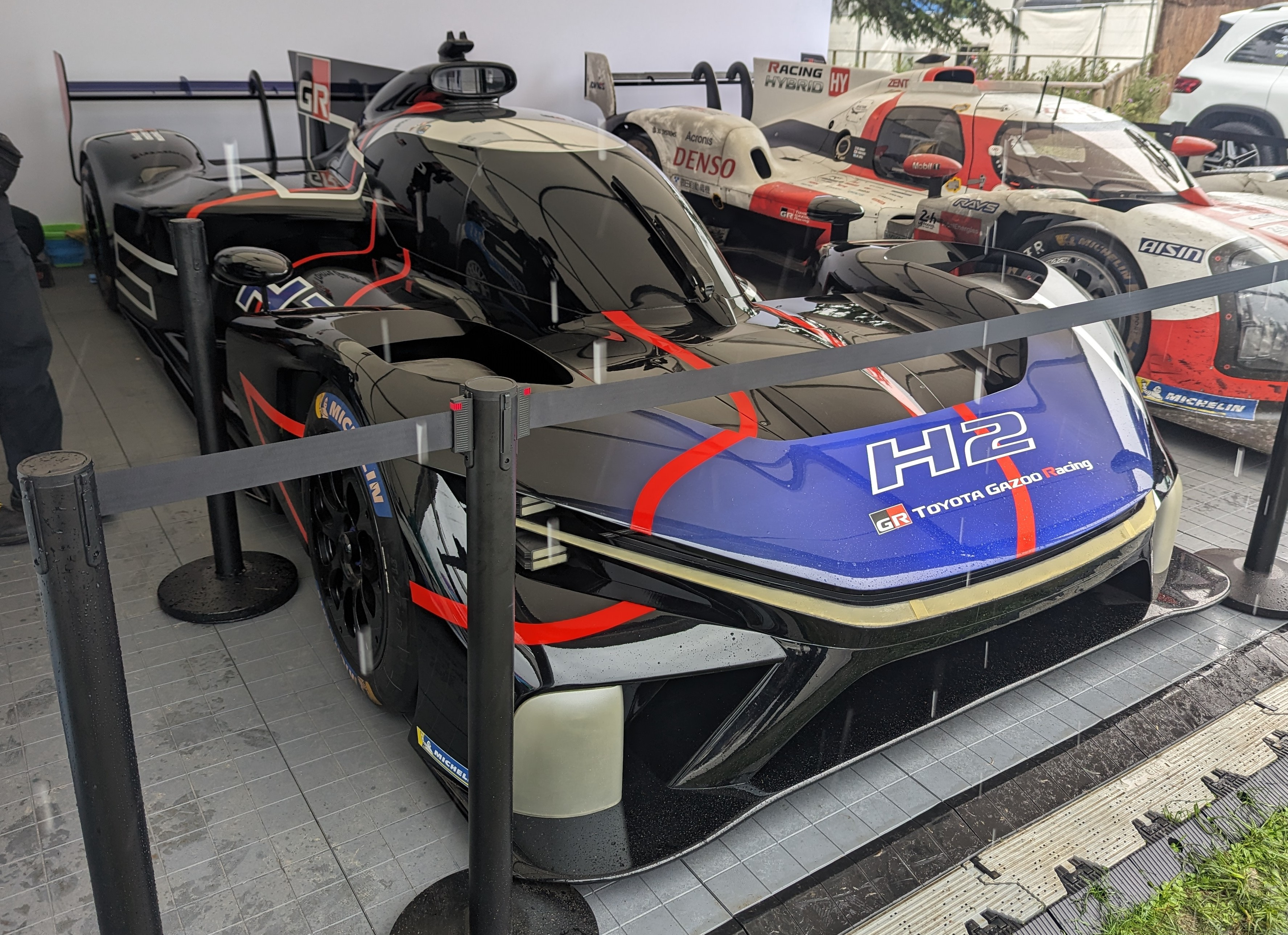

Overview
- Manufacturer: Toyota Gazoo Racing
- Production: 2023

Body and chassis
- Body style: Le Mans Hypercar

Dimensions
- Length: 5,100 mm (200 in)
- Width: 2,050 mm (81 in)

The GR H2 Racing Concept is a Le Mans Hypercar built by Toyota Gazoo Racing.

== FT-Me Concept (2025) ==
Toyota FT-Me Concept

Overview
- Manufacturer: Toyota
- Production: 2025

Body and chassis
- Body style: 2-door quadricycle

The FT-Me Concept is a two-door, battery-electric quadricycle concept. It was unveiled in March 2025 by Toyota Motor Europe.

== Century Coupe Concept (2025) ==
Century Coupe Concept
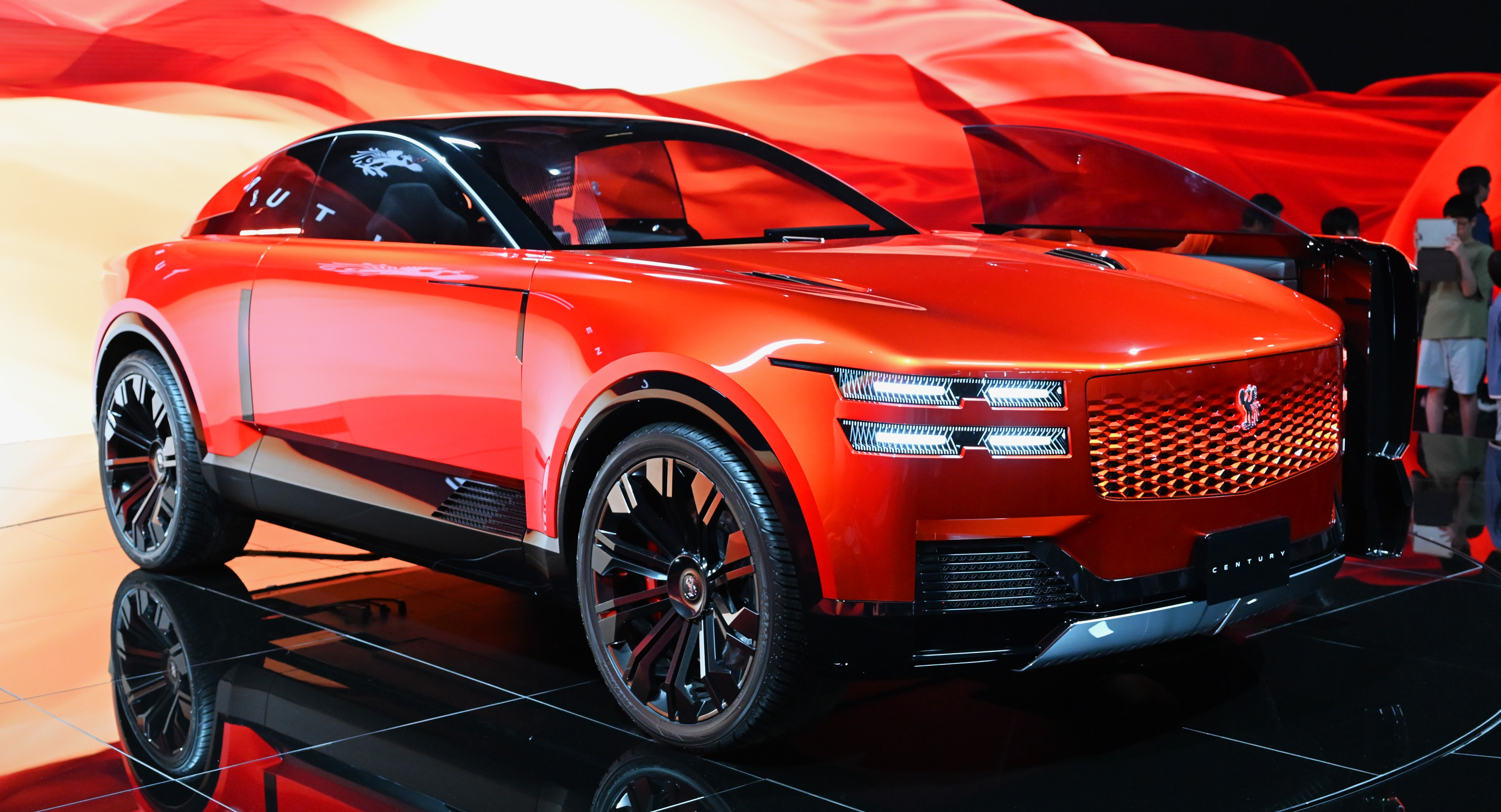

Overview
- Manufacturer: Century (Toyota)
- Production: 2025

Body and chassis
- Body style: 2-door coupe

The Century Coupe is a lifted concept coupe showcased at the 2025 Japan Mobility Show.

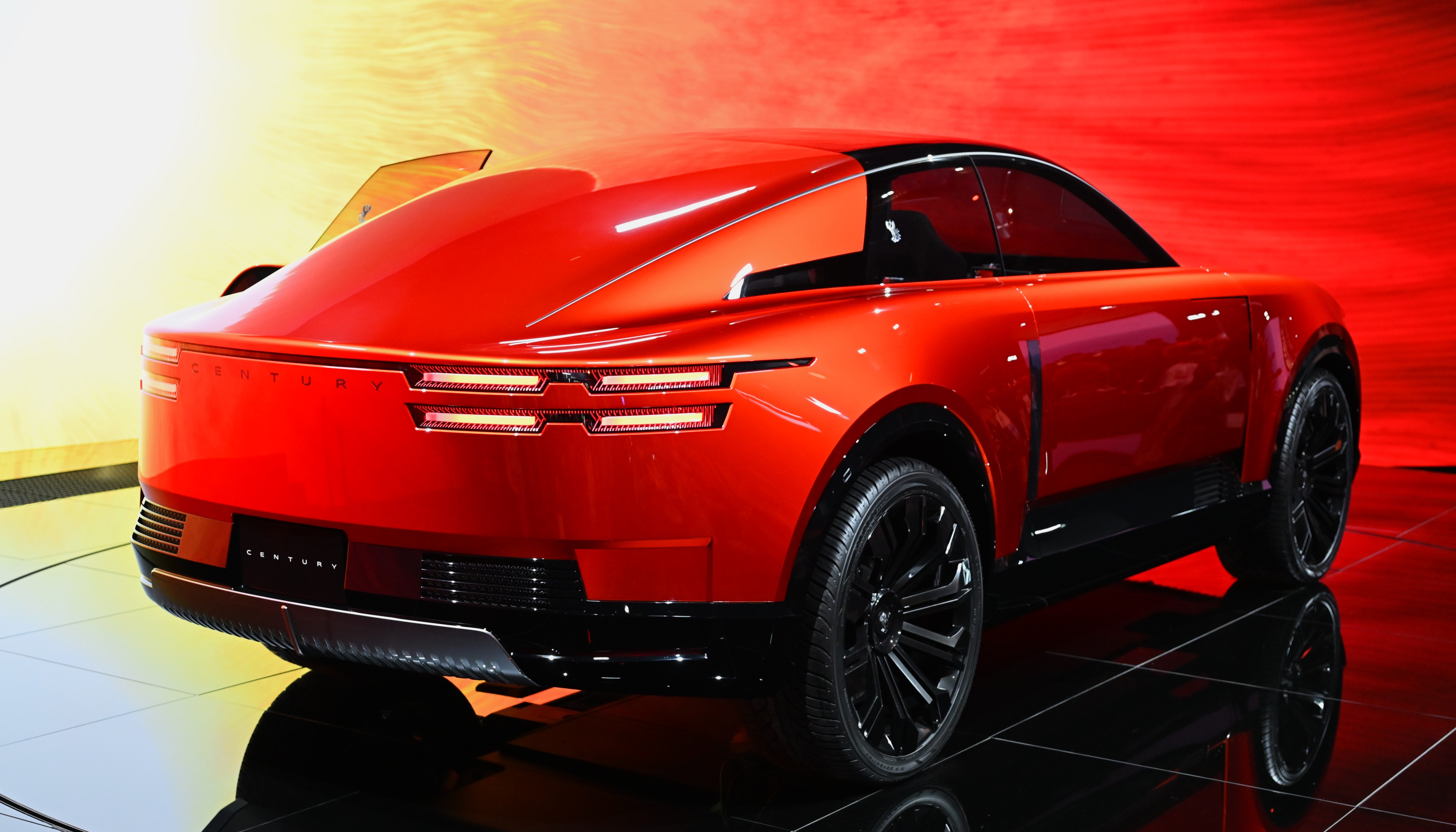
Rear view

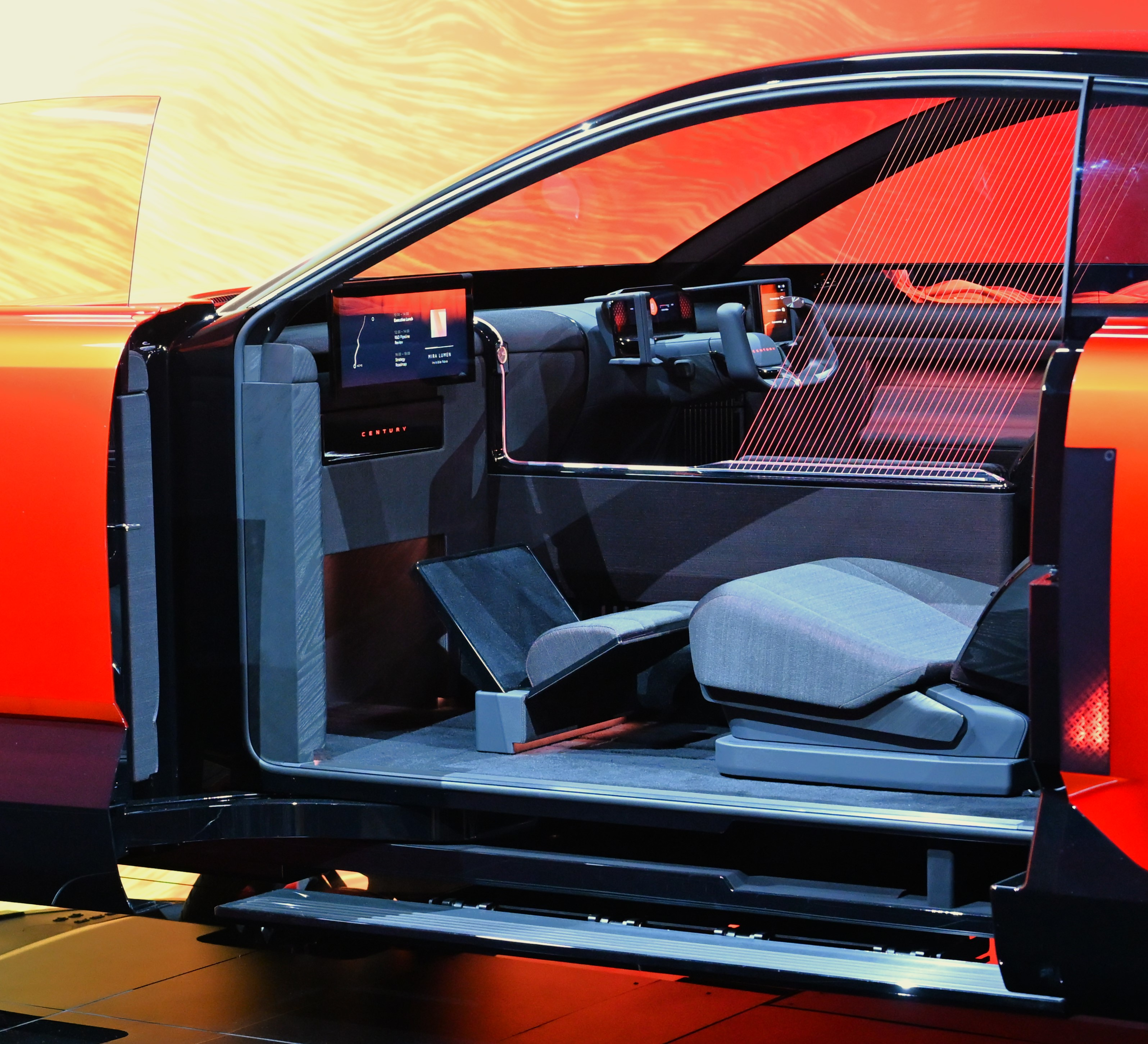
Interior

== Corolla Concept (2025) ==
Corolla Concept
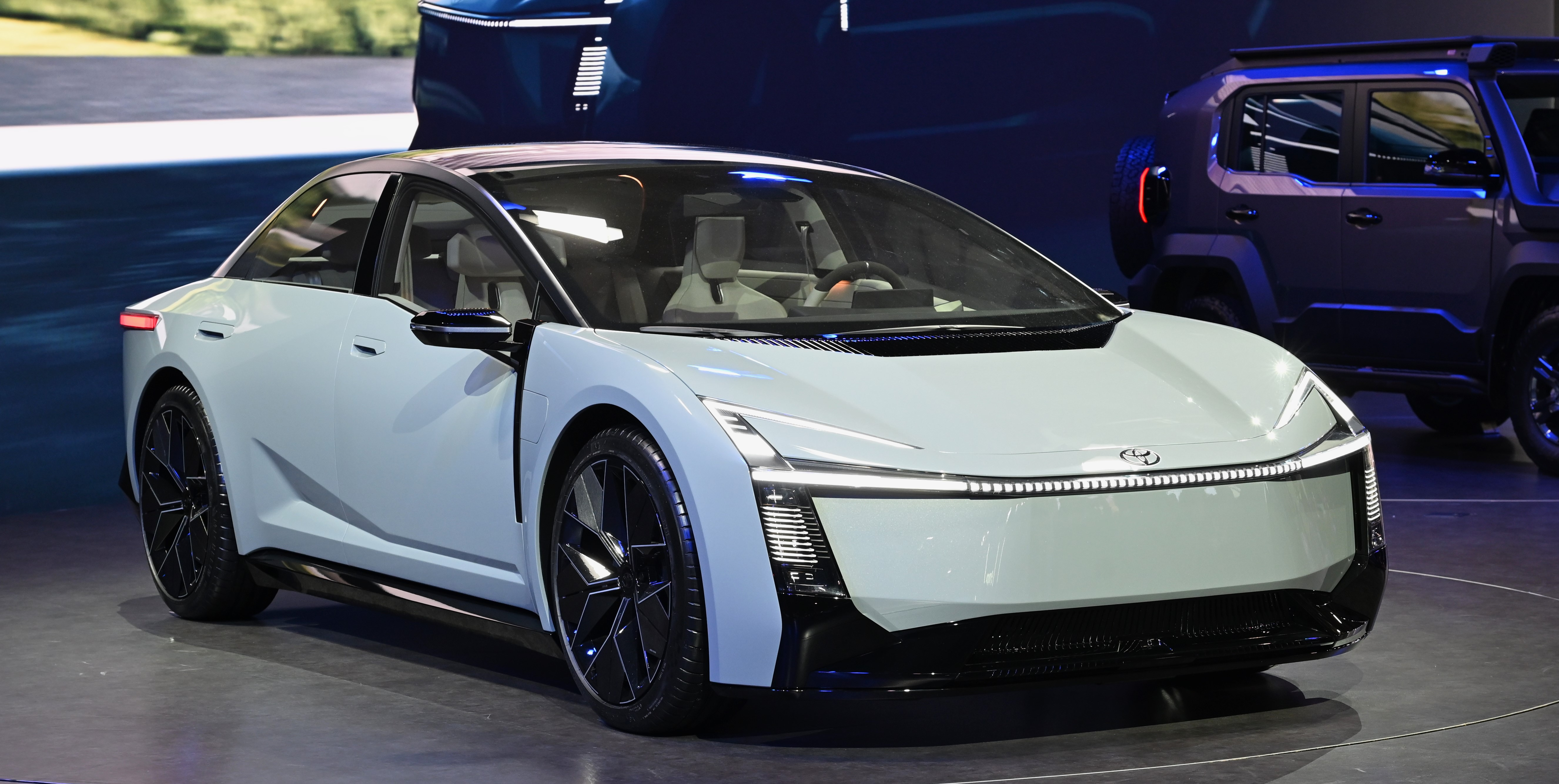

Overview
- Manufacturer: Toyota
- Production: 2025

Body and chassis
- Class: sedan
- Body style: 4-door sedan

The Corolla Concept is a concept sedan showcased at the 2025 Japan Mobility Show. The concept features a radical, sharp, and futuristic design that moves away from the traditional Corolla look. It boasts an angular exterior with full-width LED lights and a steeply raked windshield. The interior is minimalist, with a layout featuring screens for both driver and passenger and a floating centre console.

== HiAce Concept (2025) ==
HiAce Concept
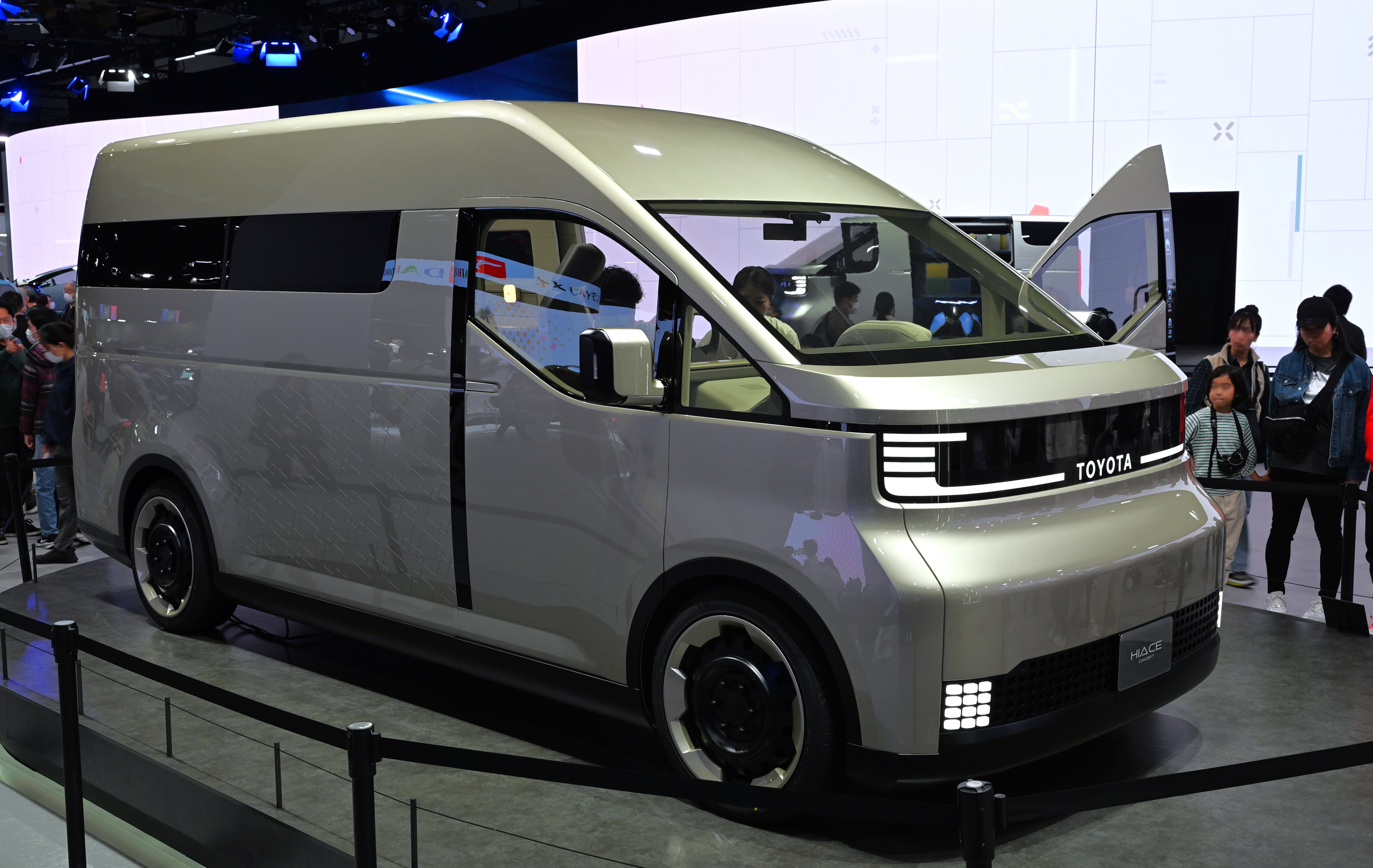

Overview
- Manufacturer: Toyota
- Production: 2025

Body and chassis
- Body style: Van

The HiAce Concept is a concept van showcased at the 2025 Japan Mobility Show.

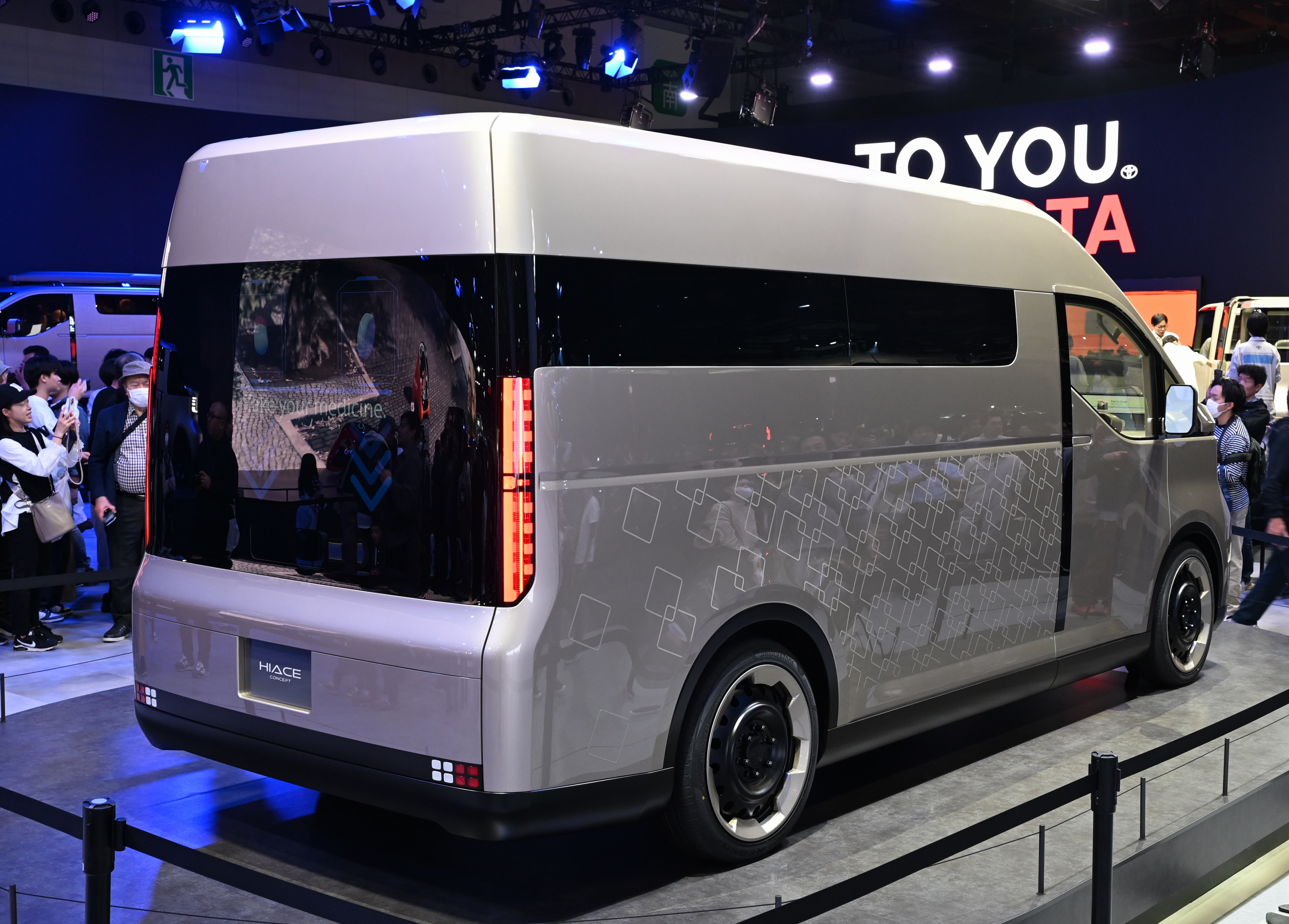
Rear view

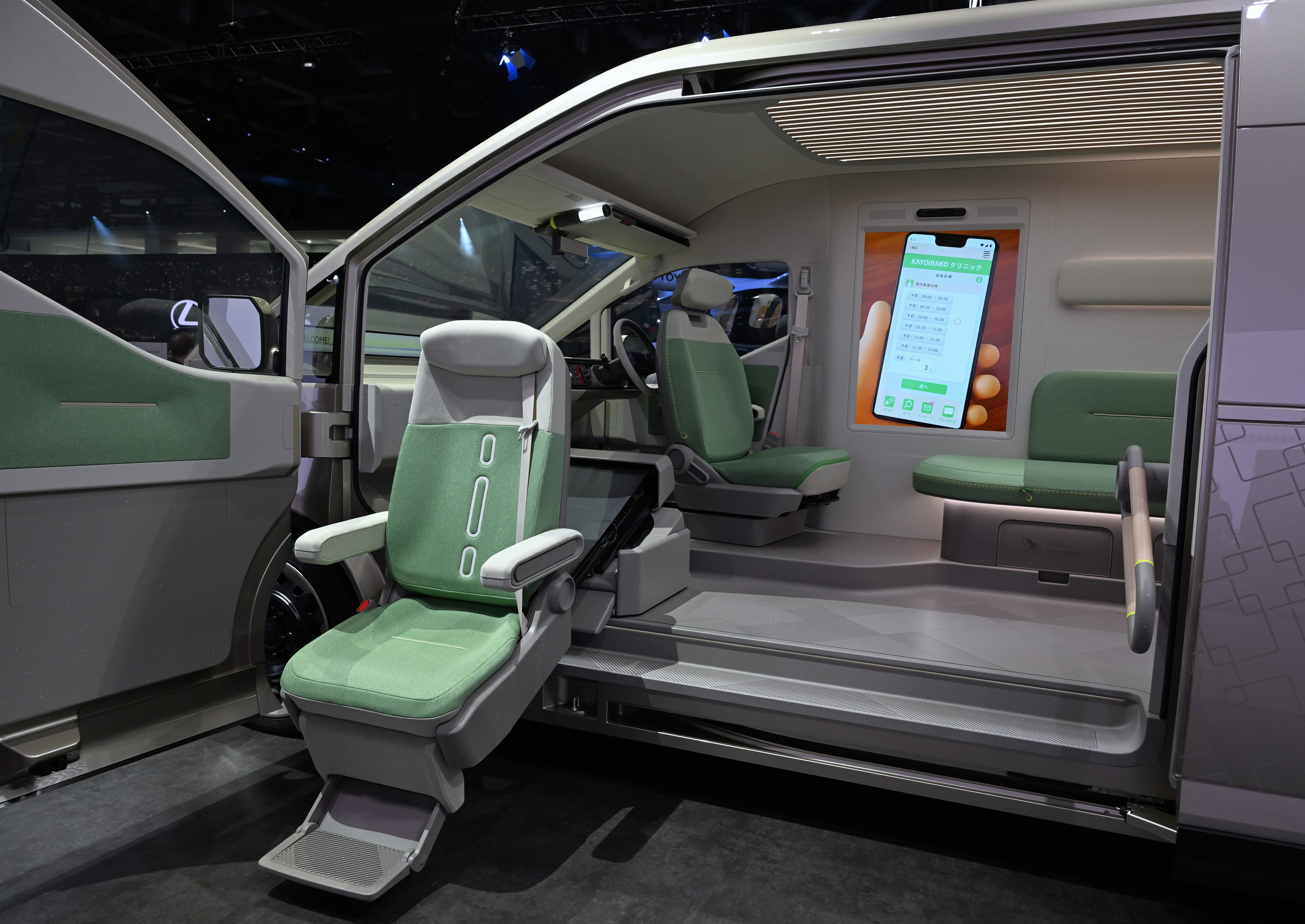
Interior (High-Roof)

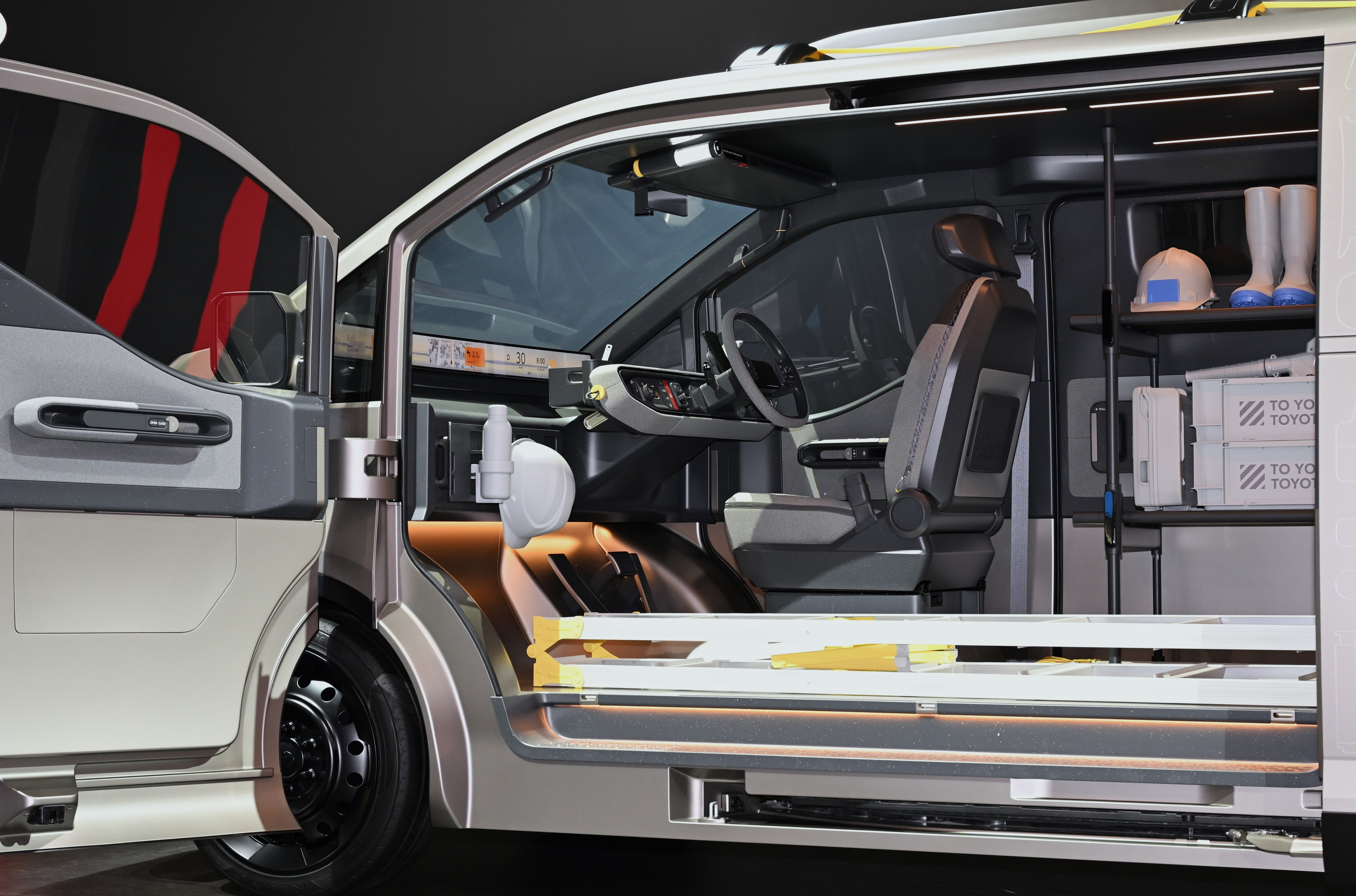
Interior

== Coms-X (2025) ==
Coms-X
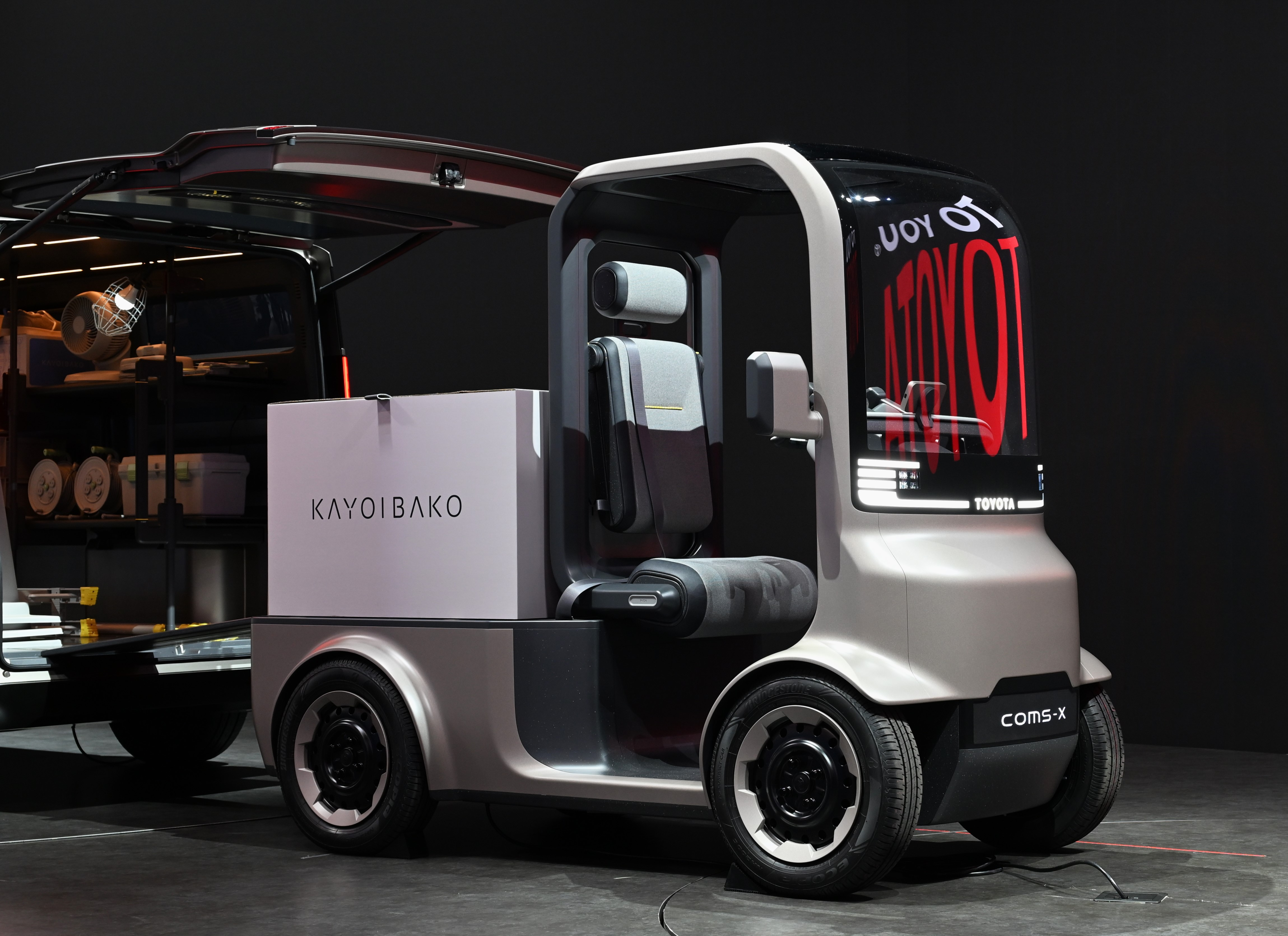

Overview
- Manufacturer: Toyota
- Production: 2025

Body and chassis
- Body style: Microcar

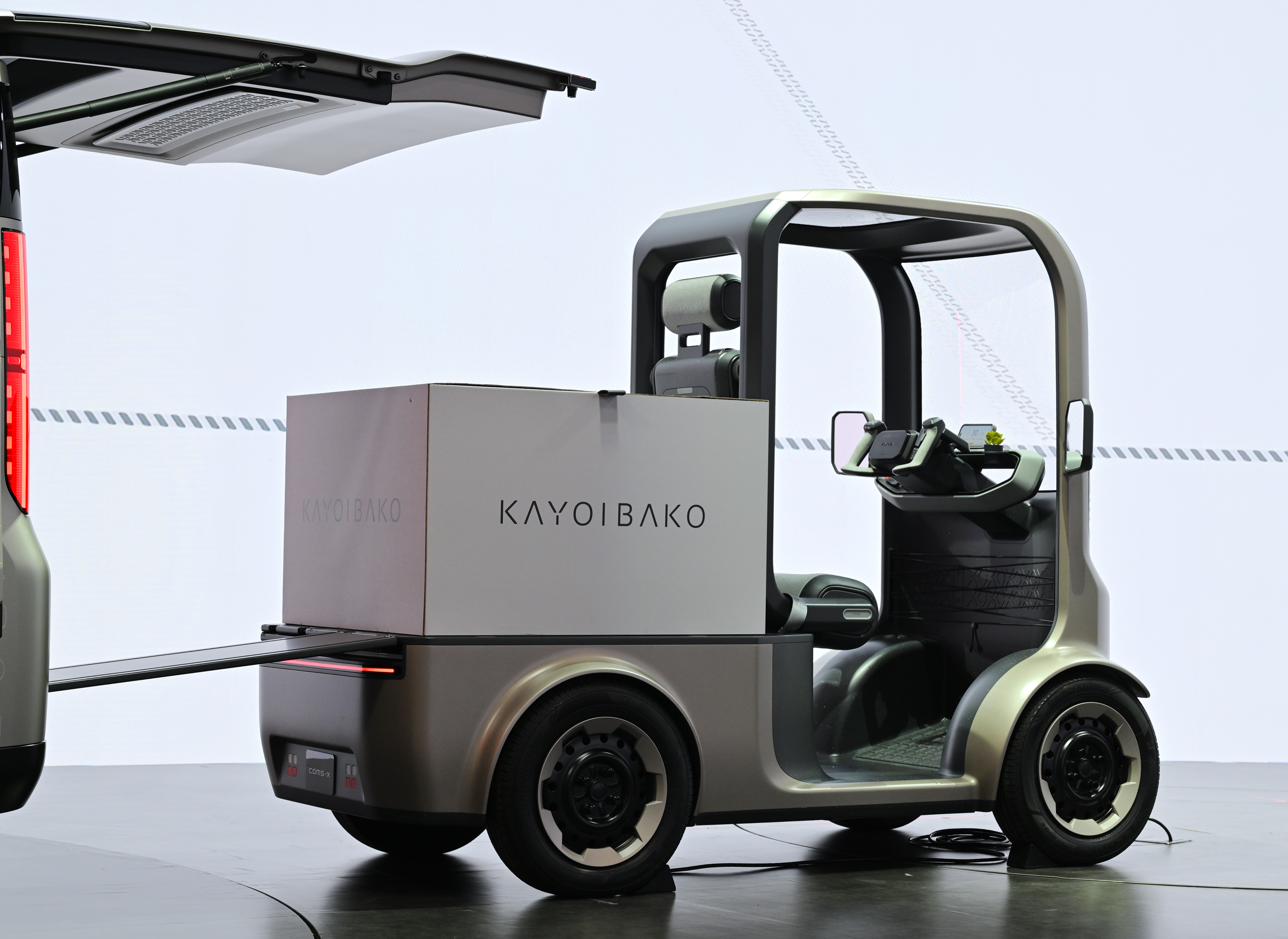
Rear view

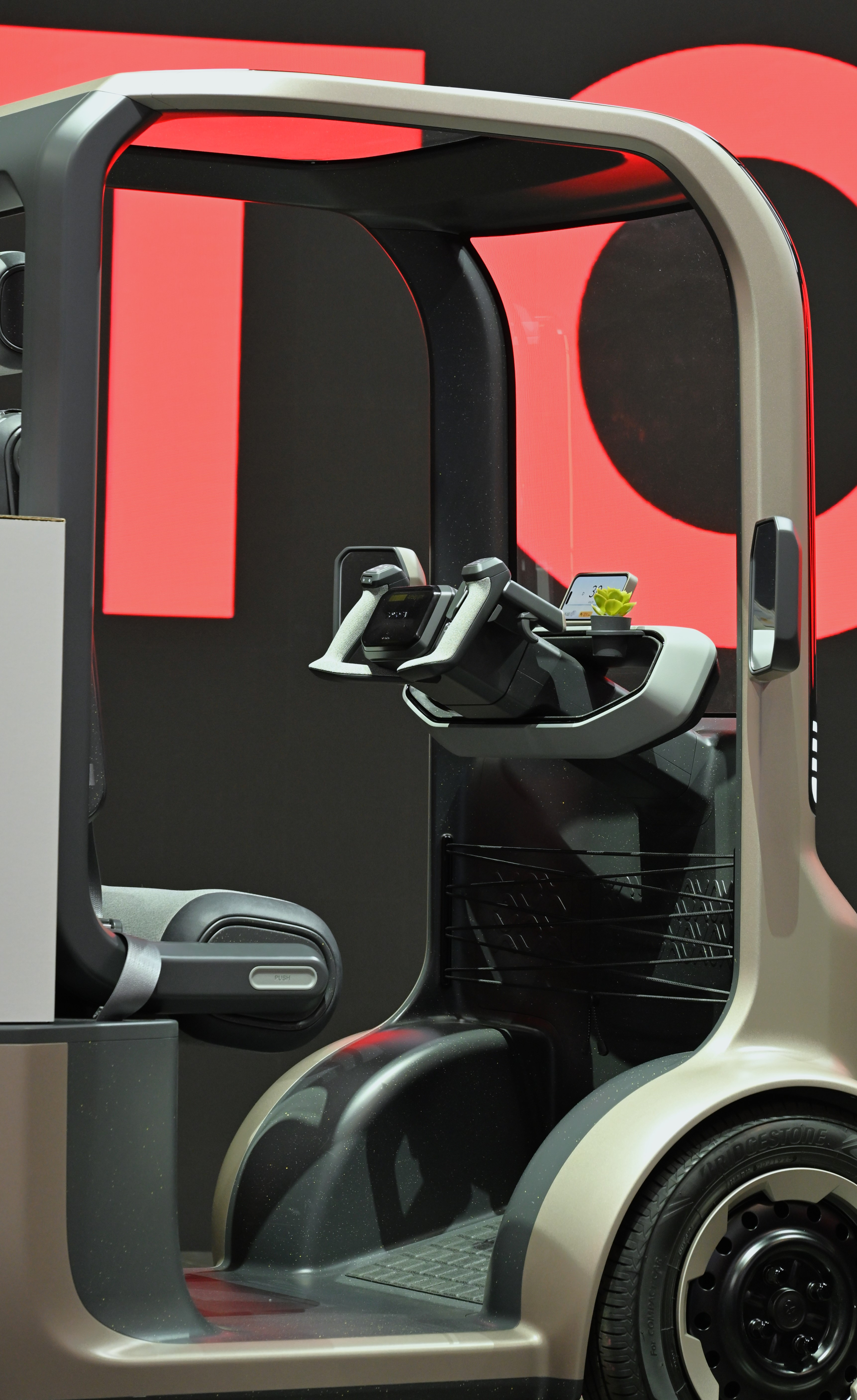
Interior

== IMV Origin (2025) ==
IMV Origin
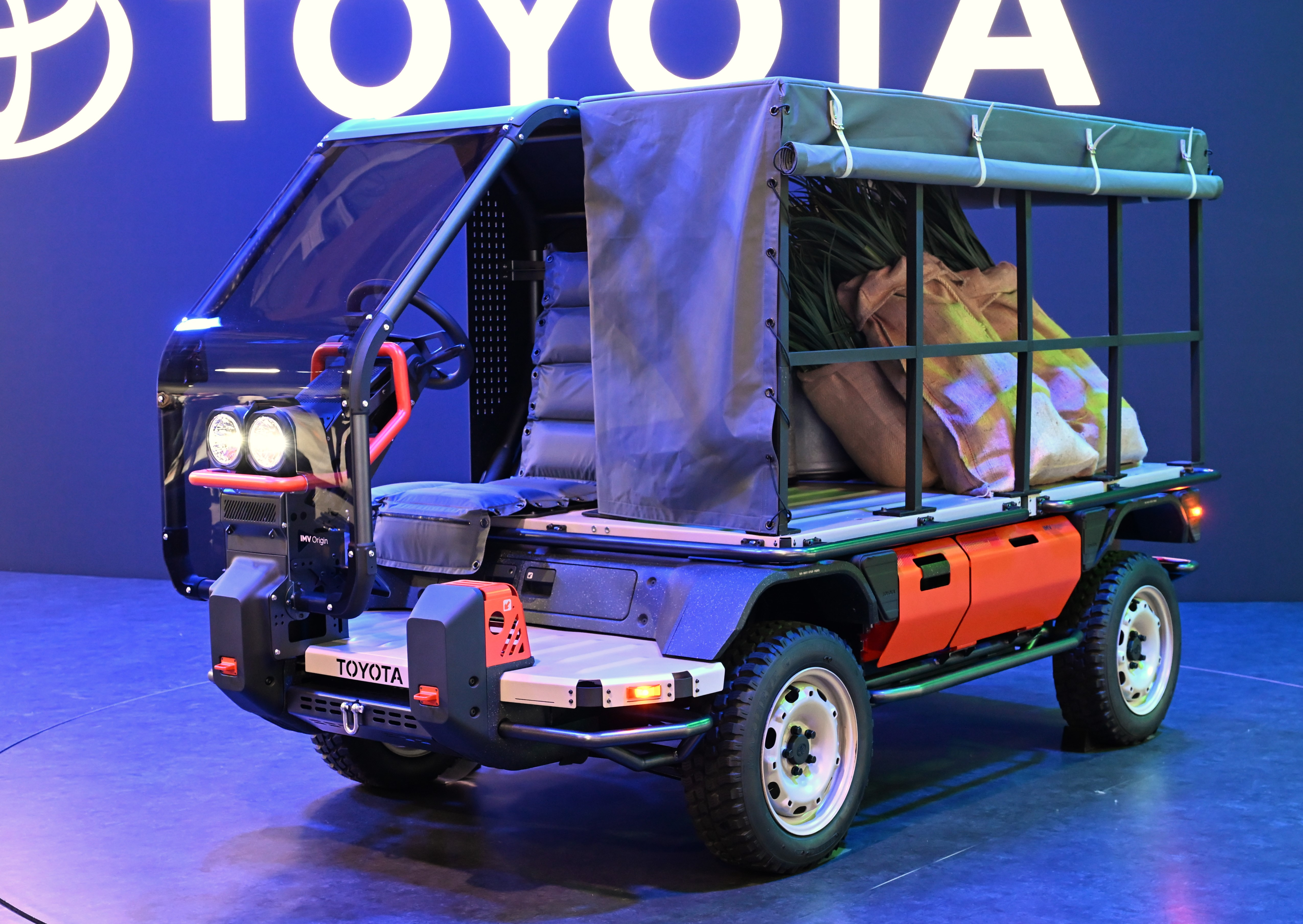

Overview
- Manufacturer: Toyota
- Production: 2025

Body and chassis
- Body style: truck

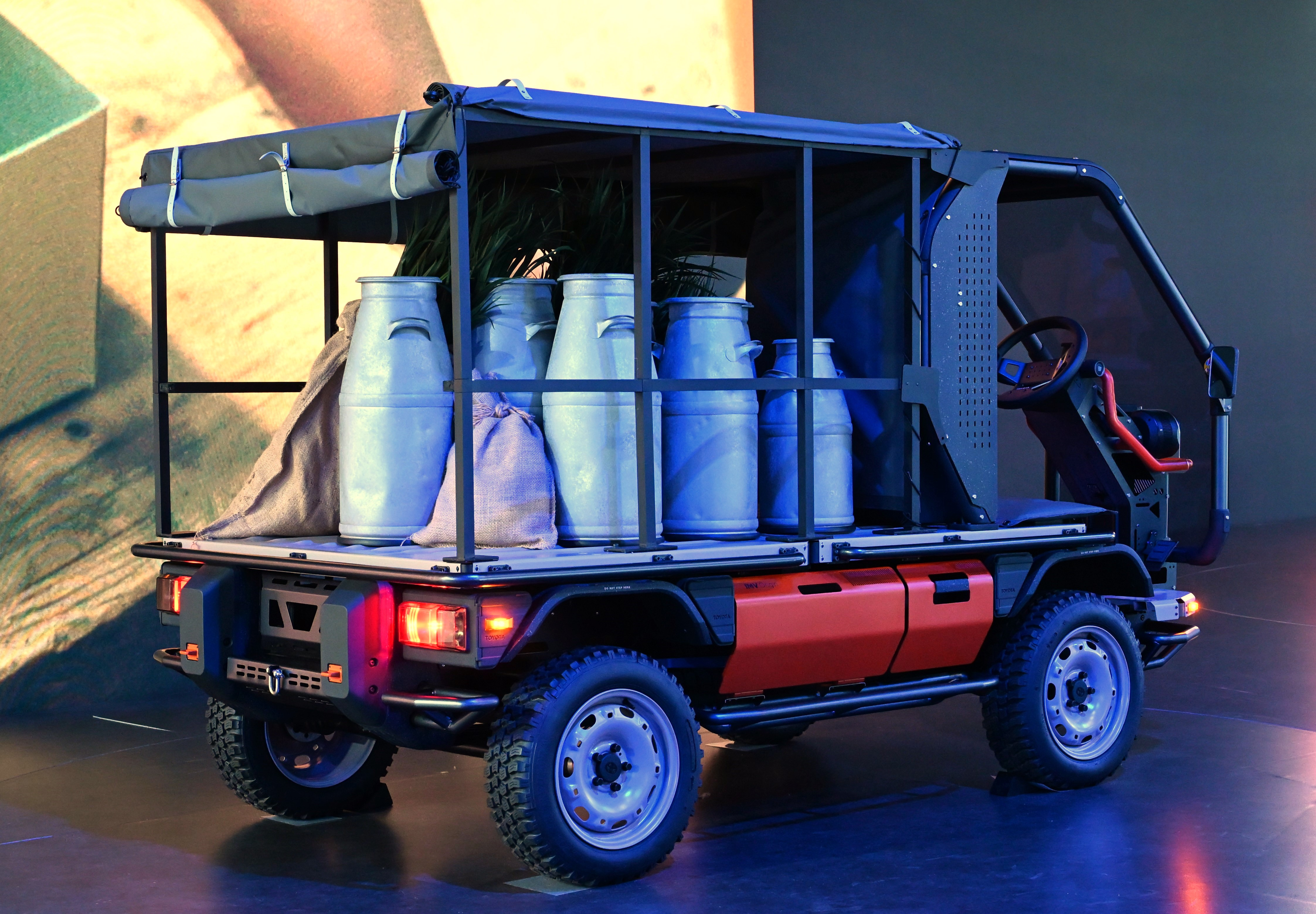
Rear view

== Kids Mobi (2025) ==
Kids Mobi
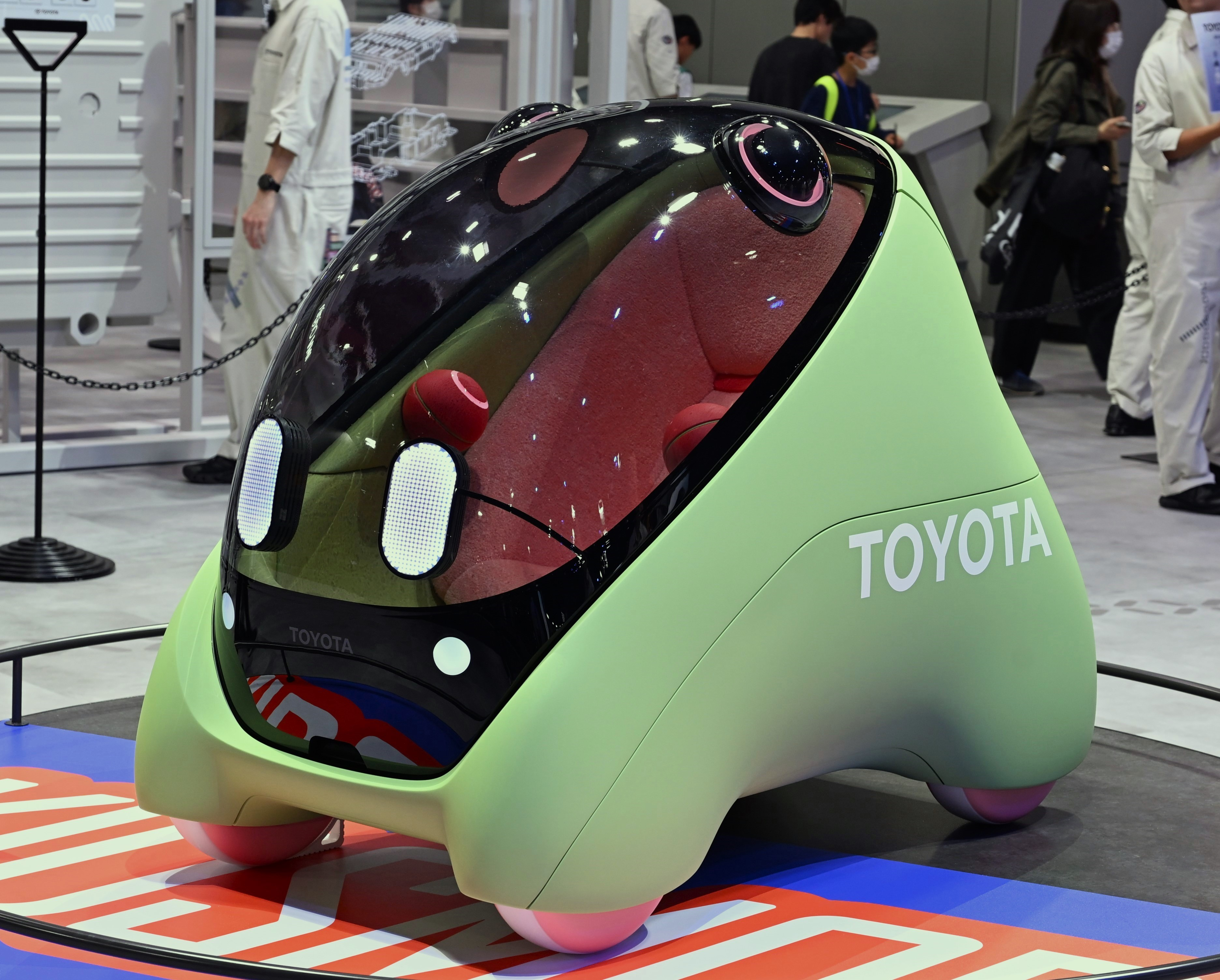

Overview
- Manufacturer: Toyota
- Production: 2025

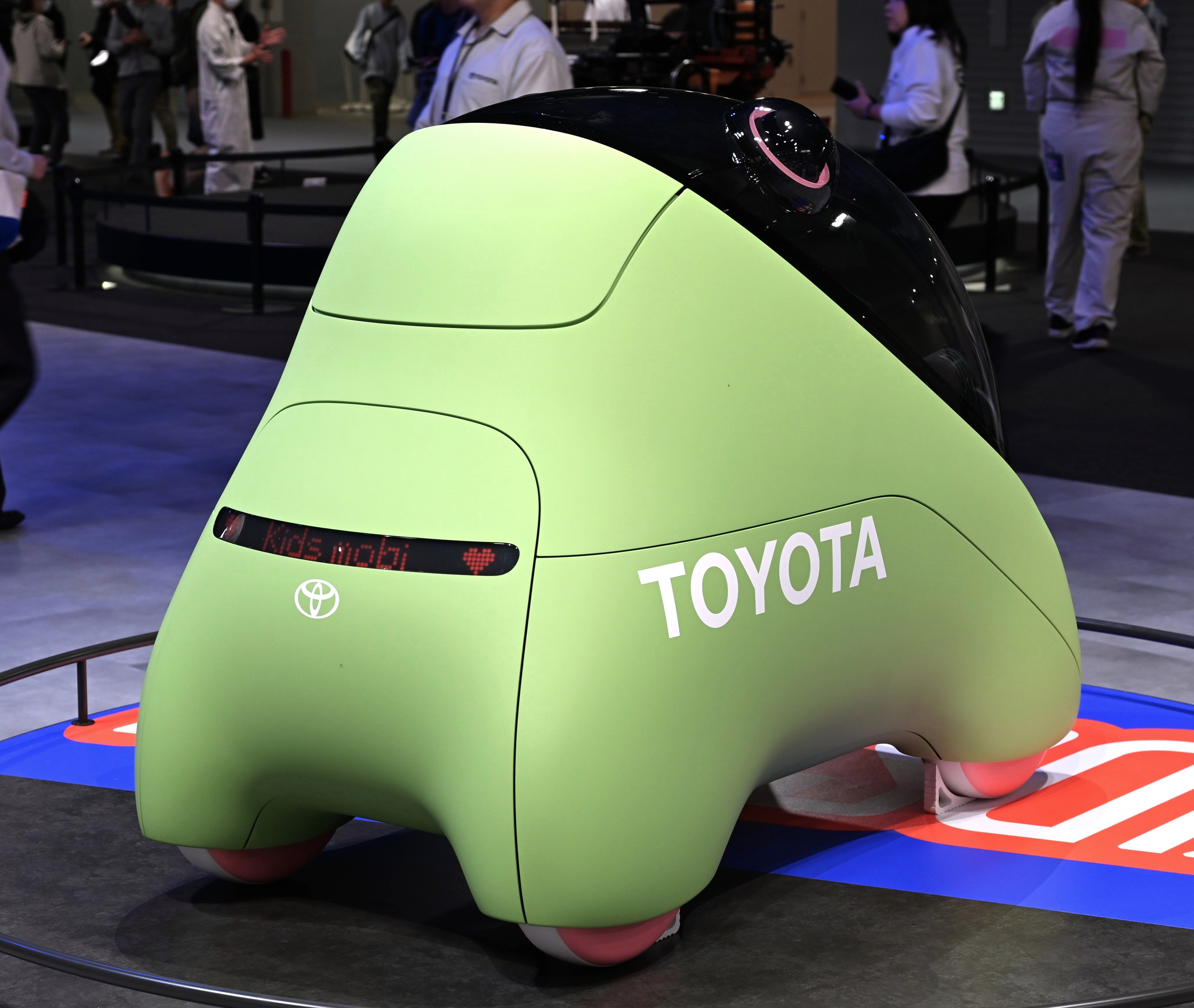
Rear view

== Kago-Bo (2025) ==
Kago-Bo
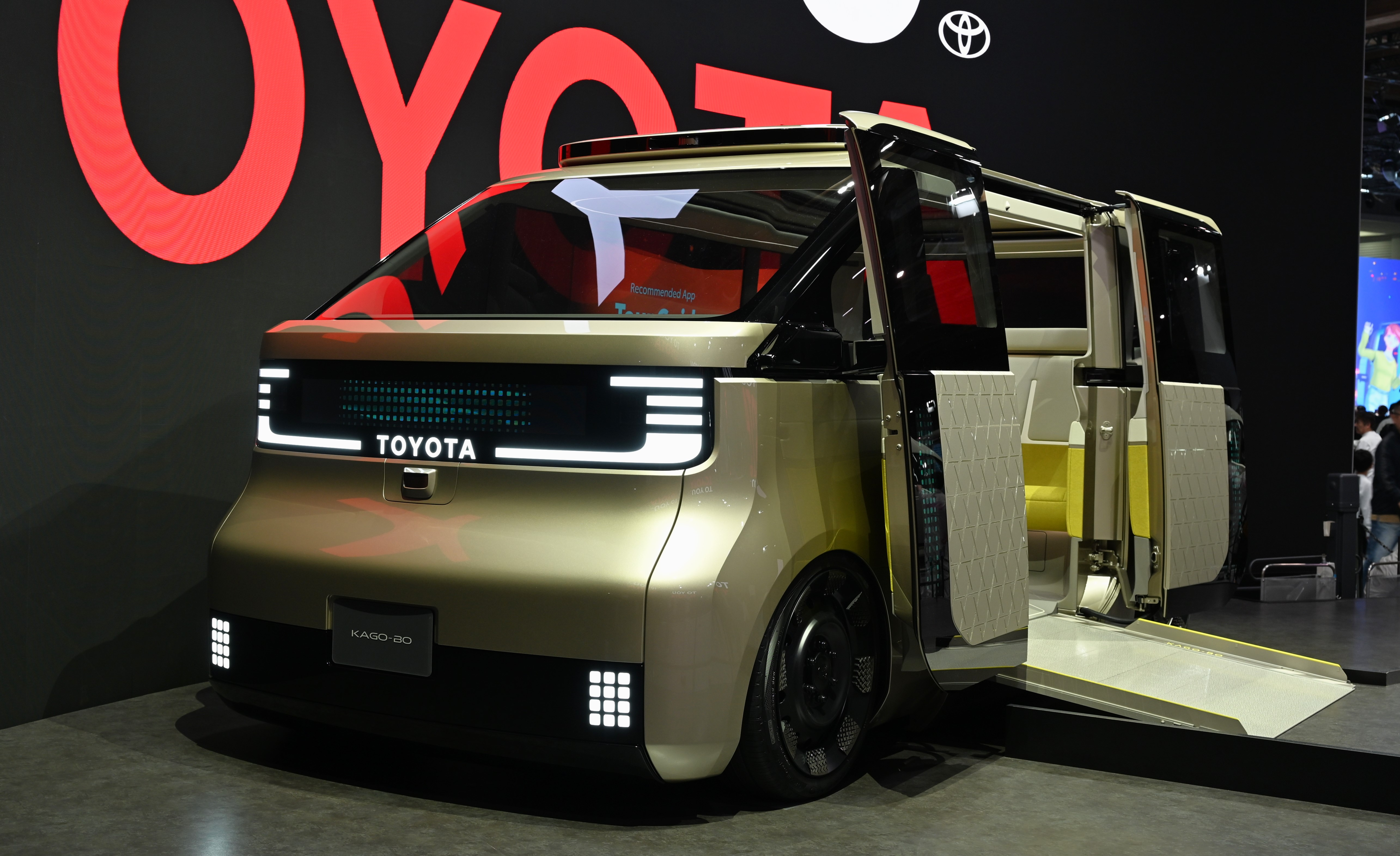

Overview
- Manufacturer: Toyota
- Production: 2025

The Toyota Kago-Bo Concept is a 2025 concept vehicle that exemplifies Toyota's "To You" design philosophy. It is a small, human-centered mobility vehicle that emphasizes accessibility and functionality over traditional design elements. The Kago-Bo Concept is designed to be compact, upright, and approachable, with a clean and modern aesthetic that aligns with Toyota's current design language for mobility concepts. It features a design that prioritizes maneuverability in dense urban environments, with symmetrical lines and short overhangs. The vehicle's shape is optimized for shared, short-range transport, maximizing cabin volume while maintaining compact street presence. The Kago-Bo Concept is a rolling lounge for the autonomous era, with its design reflecting Toyota's commitment to creating vehicles that serve all passengers equally.

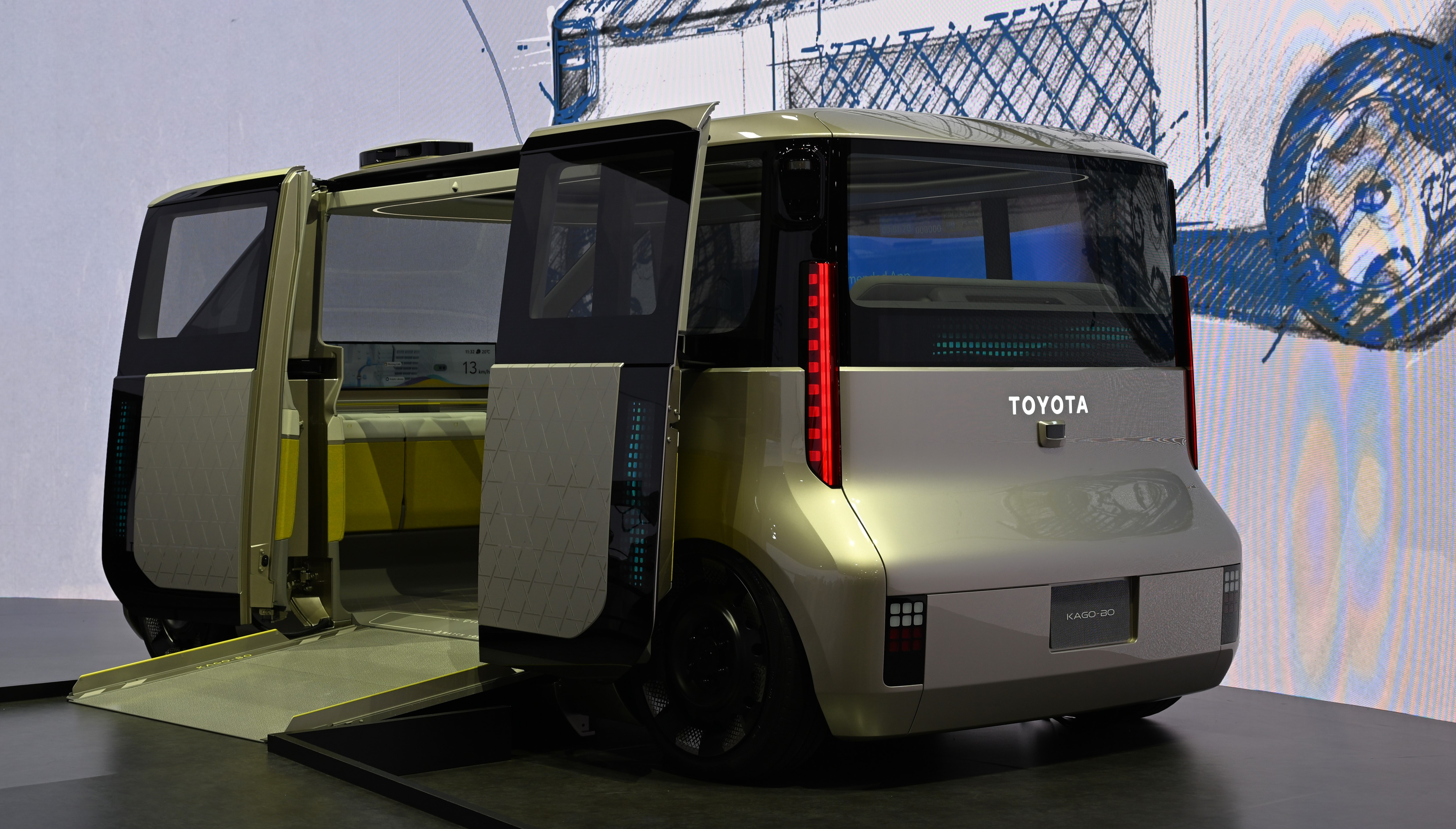
Rear view

== See also ==
- Toyota concept vehicles (1935–1969)
- Toyota concept vehicles (1970–1979)
- Toyota concept vehicles (1980–1989)
- Toyota concept vehicles (1990–1999)
- Toyota concept vehicles (2000–2009)
- Toyota concept vehicles (2010–2019)
