= Kosterin =

Kosterin (Russian: Костерин) is a Russian masculine surname, its feminine counterpart is Kosterina. The surname may refer to the following notable people:

- Alexei Kosterin (1896–1968), Russian writer and revolutionary
- Nina Kosterina (1921–1941), Soviet partisan and diarist
- Oleg Kosterin (born 1963), Russian geneticist and entomologist
- Tatyana Kosterina (born 1977), Russian horse dressage rider
- Vladimir Kosterin (born 1968), Ukrainian businessman and politician

== See also ==
- Kosterin's House in Russia
