= Toyota bZ7 =

Battery electric full-size sedan for Chinese market

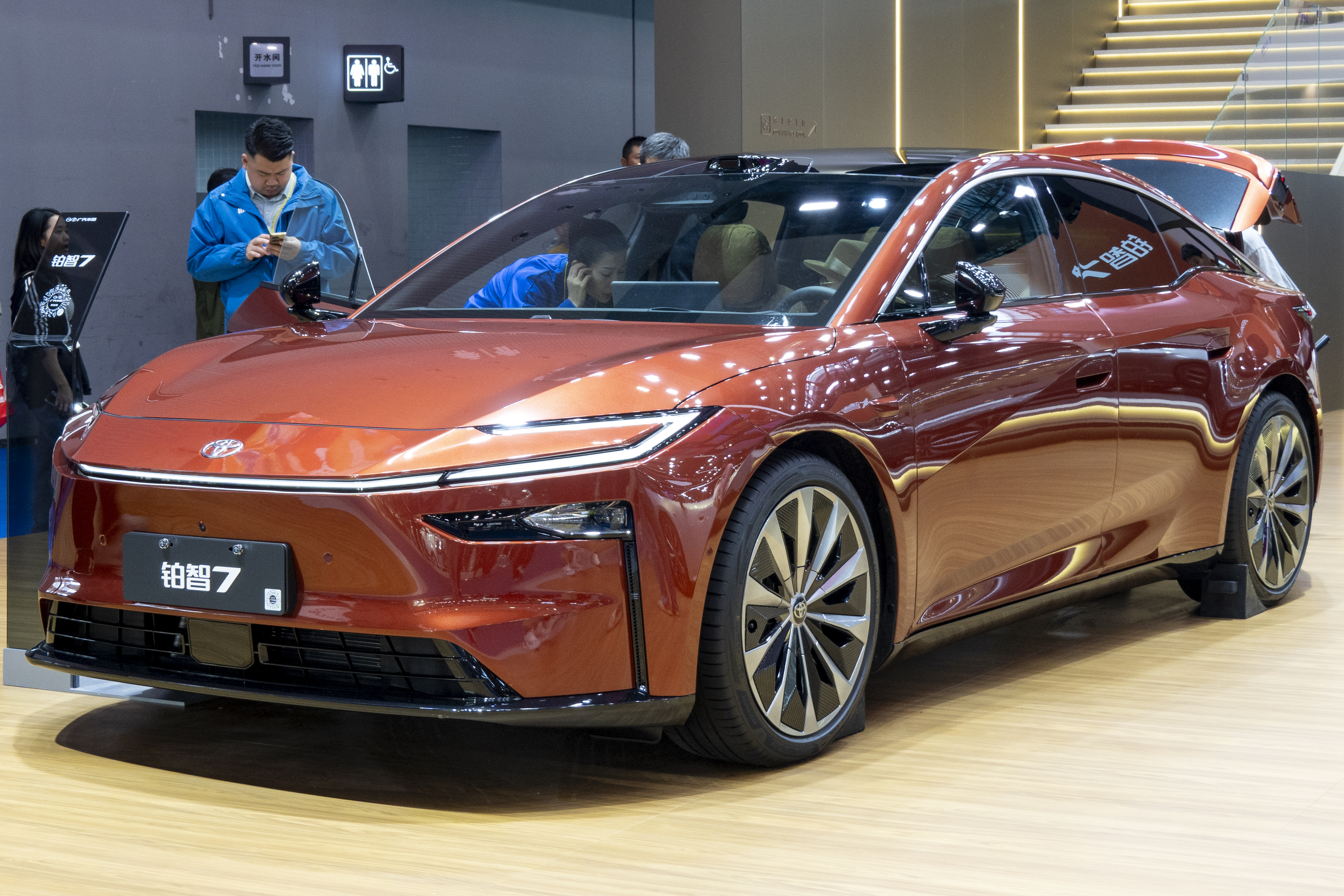

Overview
- Manufacturer: Toyota
- Model code: EP10
- Production: 2026–present
- Assembly: China: Guangzhou (GAC Toyota)

Body and chassis
- Class: Full-size car
- Body style: 4-door sedan
- Layout: Rear-motor rear-wheel-drive
- Related: Hyptec A800

Powertrain
- Electric motor: Huawei DriveONE ePowertrain on Rear Axle
- Power output: 207 kW (278 hp; 281 PS)
- Battery: 71.35 or 88.13 kWh CALB LFP
- Range: 600–710 km (375–440 mi) (CLTC)

Dimensions
- Wheelbase: 3,020 mm (118.9 in)
- Length: 5,130 mm (202.0 in)
- Width: 1,965 mm (77.4 in)
- Height: 1,506 mm (59.3 in)

The Toyota bZ7 (Chinese: 铂智7; pinyin: Bózhì 7; lit. 'Platinum Wisdom 7') is a battery electric full-size sedan produced by GAC Toyota, the joint venture of GAC Group and Toyota. The vehicle is based on GAC Aion's Hyptec A800. Forming part of the bZ series, it was introduced in 2025 and went on sale in 2026.

== History ==
Before its introduction, the bZ7 was first previewed by the bZ Satisfied Space (Chinese: 舒享空间) concept, a battery electric sedan developed by GAC Toyota which was showcased at Auto Guangzhou 2023. It was also shown later in Auto China 2024 in Beijing.

In November 2024, a near-production "bZ7 Concept" was shown in the 2024 Guangzhou Auto Show.

Subsequently, the production version of the bZ7 made its debut at the 2025 Auto Shanghai.

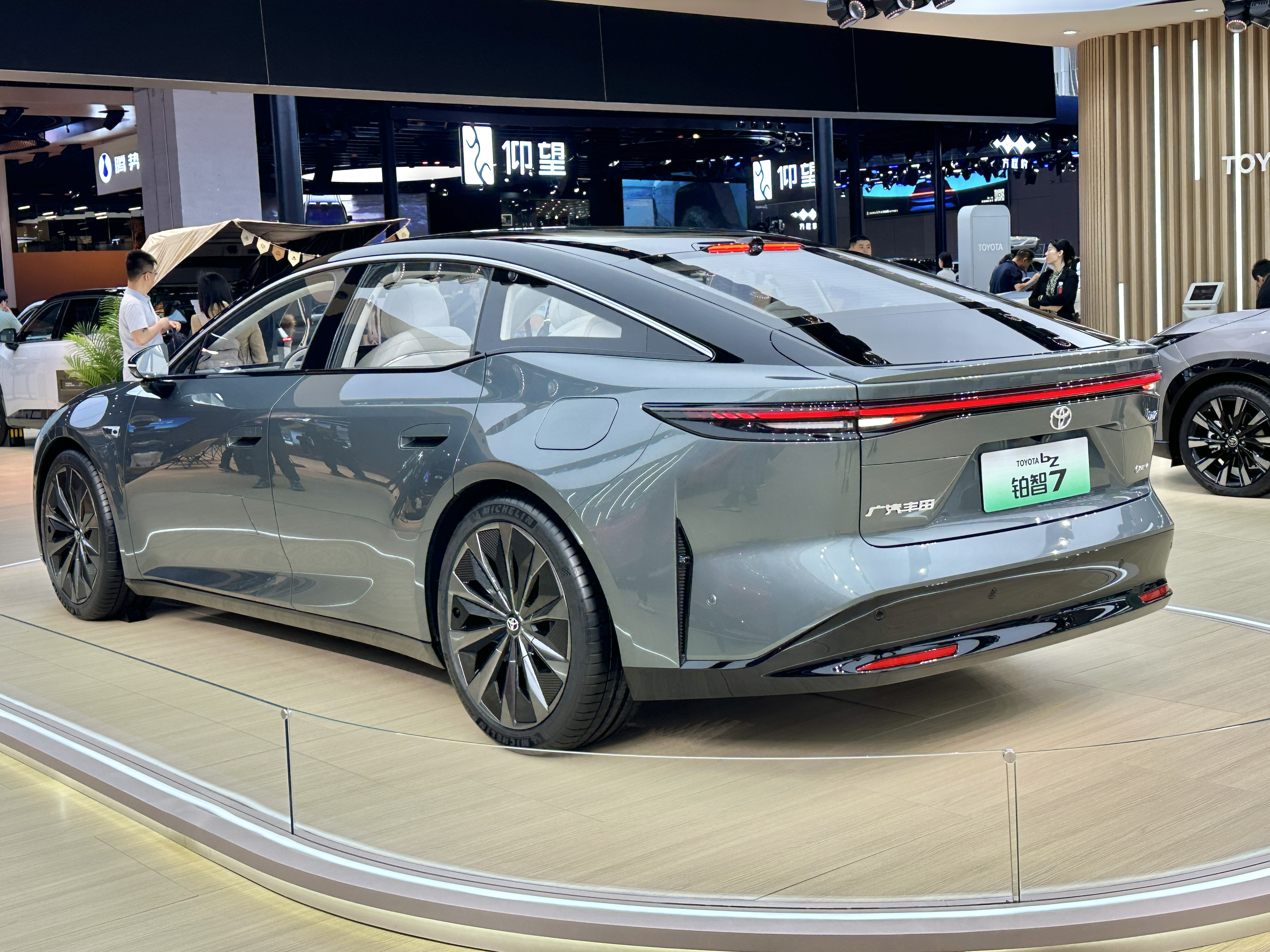
Rear view

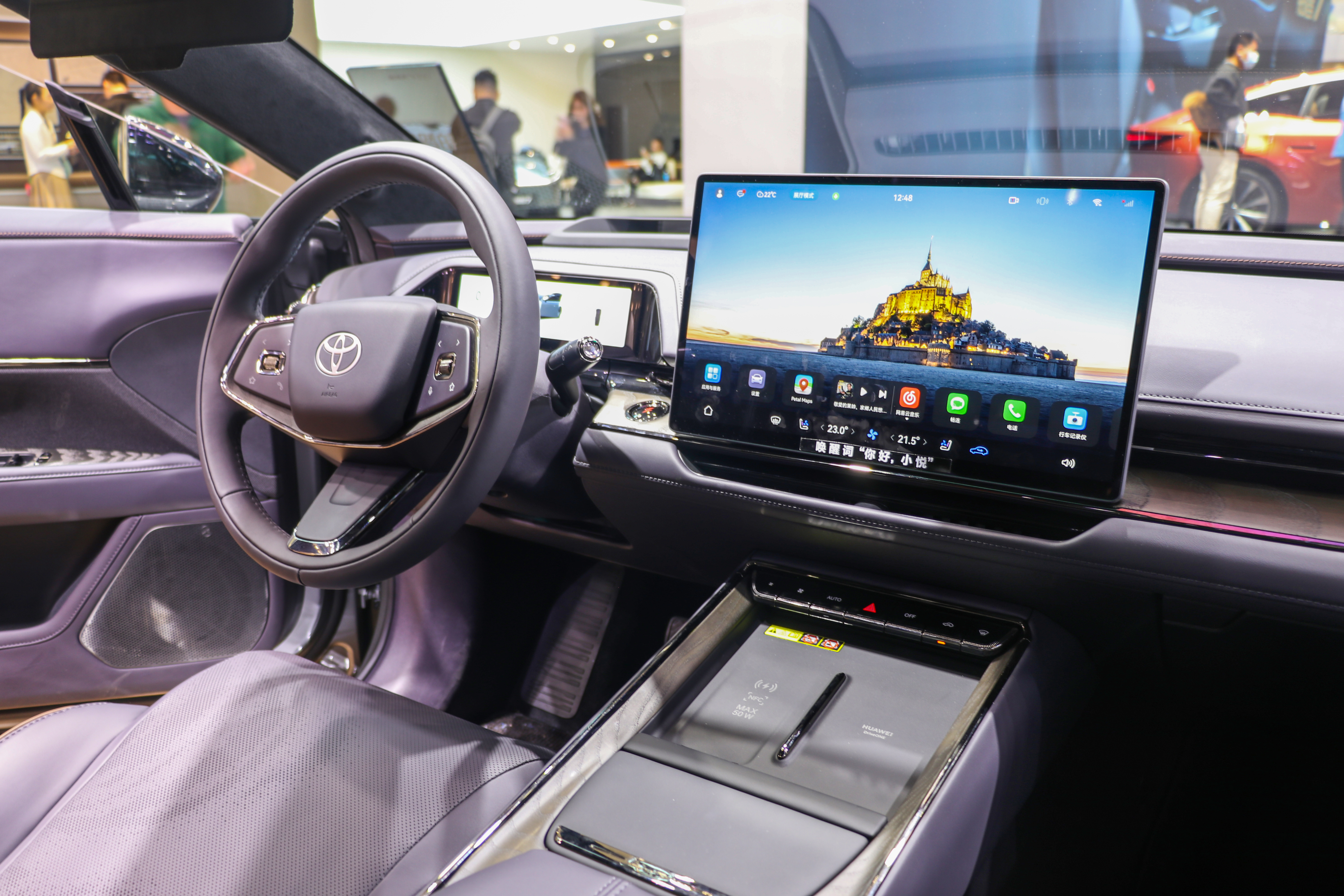
Interior

== Overview ==
The Toyota bZ7 is the second sedan and fifth model to be part of the Toyota bZ ("beyond Zero") series of zero-emissions vehicles following the bZ5 crossover SUV. It is the company's first vehicle to feature Huawei's HarmonyOS system.

The bZ7 uses Toyota's corporate "hammerhead" front-end design language, featuring a continuous light bar with angular C-shaped ends. Split headlights are used. The profile is similar to that of a fastback, though the vehicle retains a separate trunk. Semi-hidden door handles and 21-inch multi spoke rims are used. The rear features a high-mounted light bar and a small wing.

The interior features a three-spoke steering wheel, wireless charging pads atop the center console, extensive ambient lighting, and a panoramic glass roof. The front seats are heated, ventilated and massaging, with a zero-gravity function. Multiple displays are used, including a 15.6-inch floating central display, an 8.8-inch recessed instrument panel and a 26-inch head-up display. They are powered by Huawei's HarmonySpace 5.0 system, with a full integration to Xiaomi's in-car ecosystems as well.

=== Powertrain ===
The bZ7 is powered by Huawei's DriveONE system, with a single motor delivering a maximum power output of 207 kW (278 hp) and reaching a top speed of 180 km/h (110 mph). Two lithium iron phosphate (LFP) batteries from CALB are offered — either a 71.35 kWh or 88.13 kWh module, providing up to 600 km (370 mi) and between 680–710 km (420–440 mi) of CLTC range.

== See also ==
- List of Toyota vehicles
