= Toyota bZ =

Series of battery electric vehicles from Toyota

The Toyota bZ series ("beyond Zero") is a family of battery electric vehicles (BEV) manufactured by Toyota. It was introduced in April 2021 alongside the bZ4X Concept. The bZ series is a part of Toyota's plan to introduce 15 battery electric vehicle models by 2025, seven of which are from the bZ series. Vehicles from the bZ series make use of the e-TNGA platform co-developed with Subaru.

According to Toyota, the "beyond Zero" name is intended to convey the desire to provide customers with value that exceeds mere "zero emissions." The company described the bZ series as a "human-centered" approach aimed for regions such as China, North America, and Europe, where there are growing demand for BEVs.

Its first vehicle, the bZ4X, is produced in Japan and China and has been sold since mid-2022. The second model, called bZ3, was introduced in October 2022 to be sold exclusively in China in 2023. It is co-developed with BYD Auto through the BYD Toyota EV Technology (BTET) joint venture.

In 2025, Toyota decided to move away from the bZ naming strategy with plans to use names from current cars that are familiar to customers. The Urban Cruiser and C-HR+ are the first to use names that move away from the old system. The bZ4X will likely be the only electric car Toyota sells globally under the bZ naming strategy.

== Production models ==
Patent fillings in 2020 revealed that Toyota had registered nine nameplates under the bZ series, which include bZ1, bZ2, bZ2X, bZ3, bZ3X, bZ4, bZ4X, bZ5, and bZ5X. The numbers refer to the vehicle size or segment, while the 'X' denotes to the vehicle being a crossover SUV.

=== Current production models ===
- Toyota bZ3 (2023–present); sold in China only
- Toyota bZ5 (2025–present); sold in China only
- Toyota bZ7 (2025–present); sold in China only
- Toyota bZ3X (2024–present); sold in China, Hong Kong, and Macau
- Toyota bZ4X/bZ (2022–present); sold globally
- Toyota bZ4X Touring/bZ Woodland (2025–present); sold in Japan, Australia, Europe and North America
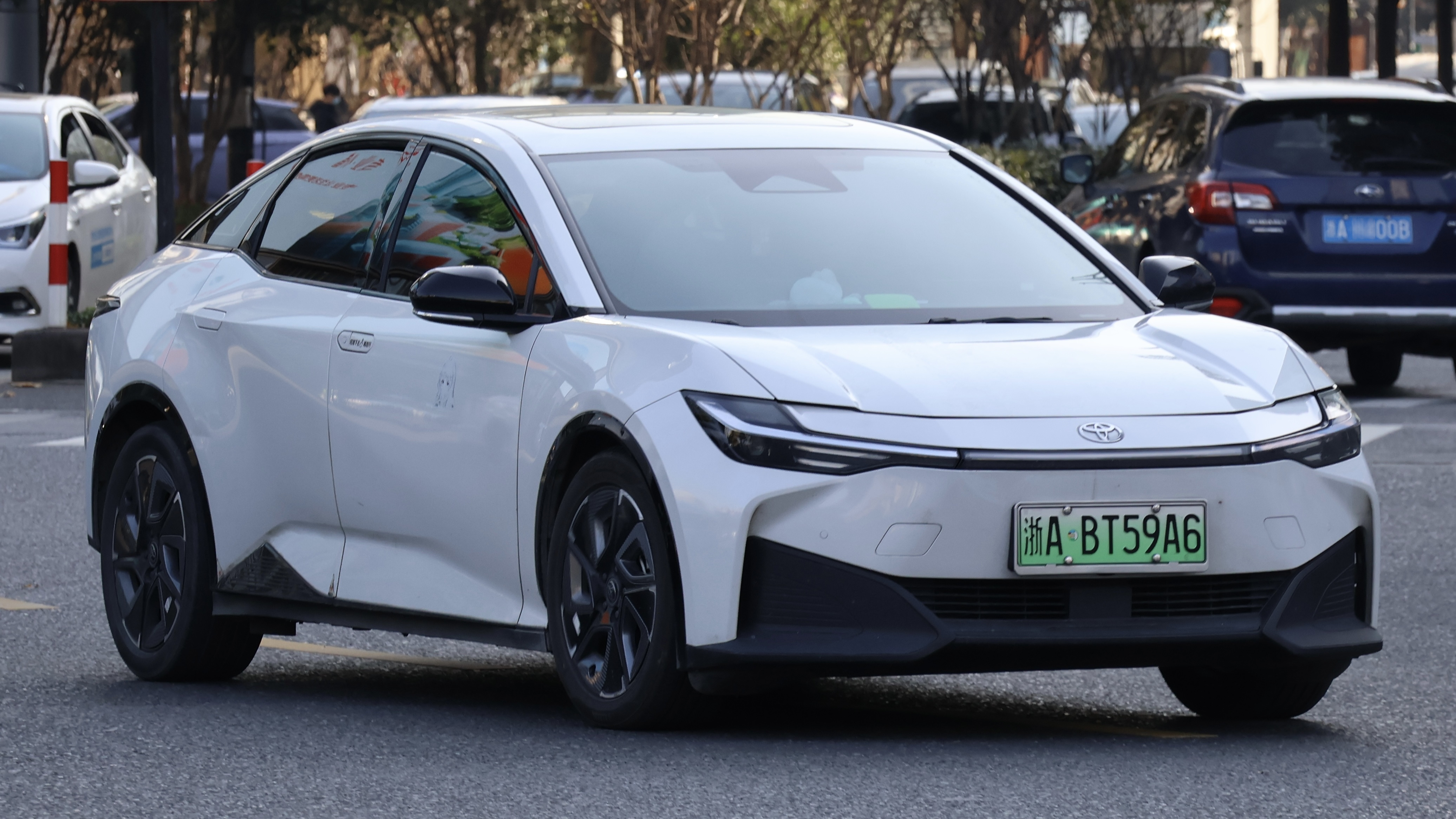
Toyota bZ3

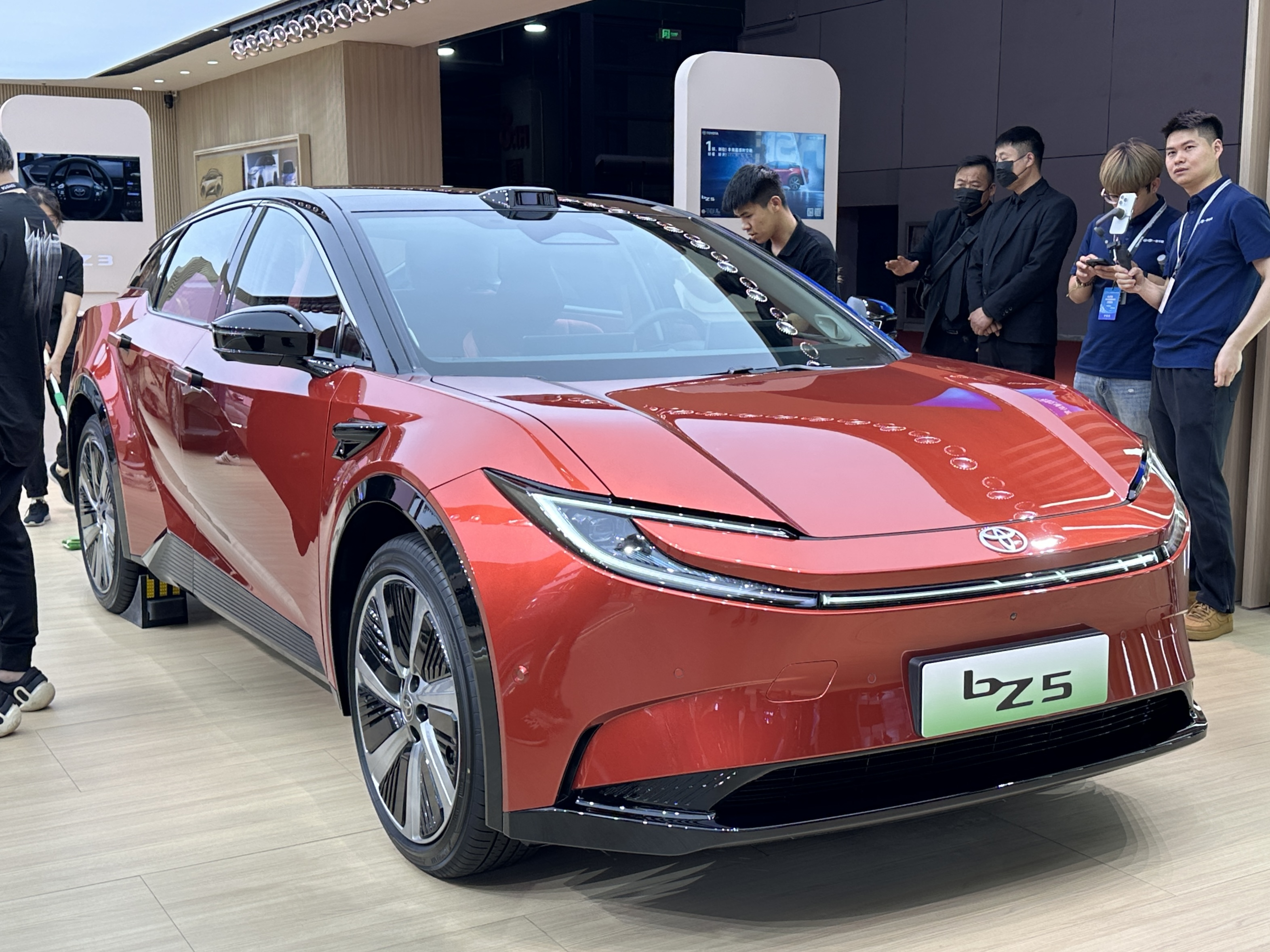
Toyota bZ5

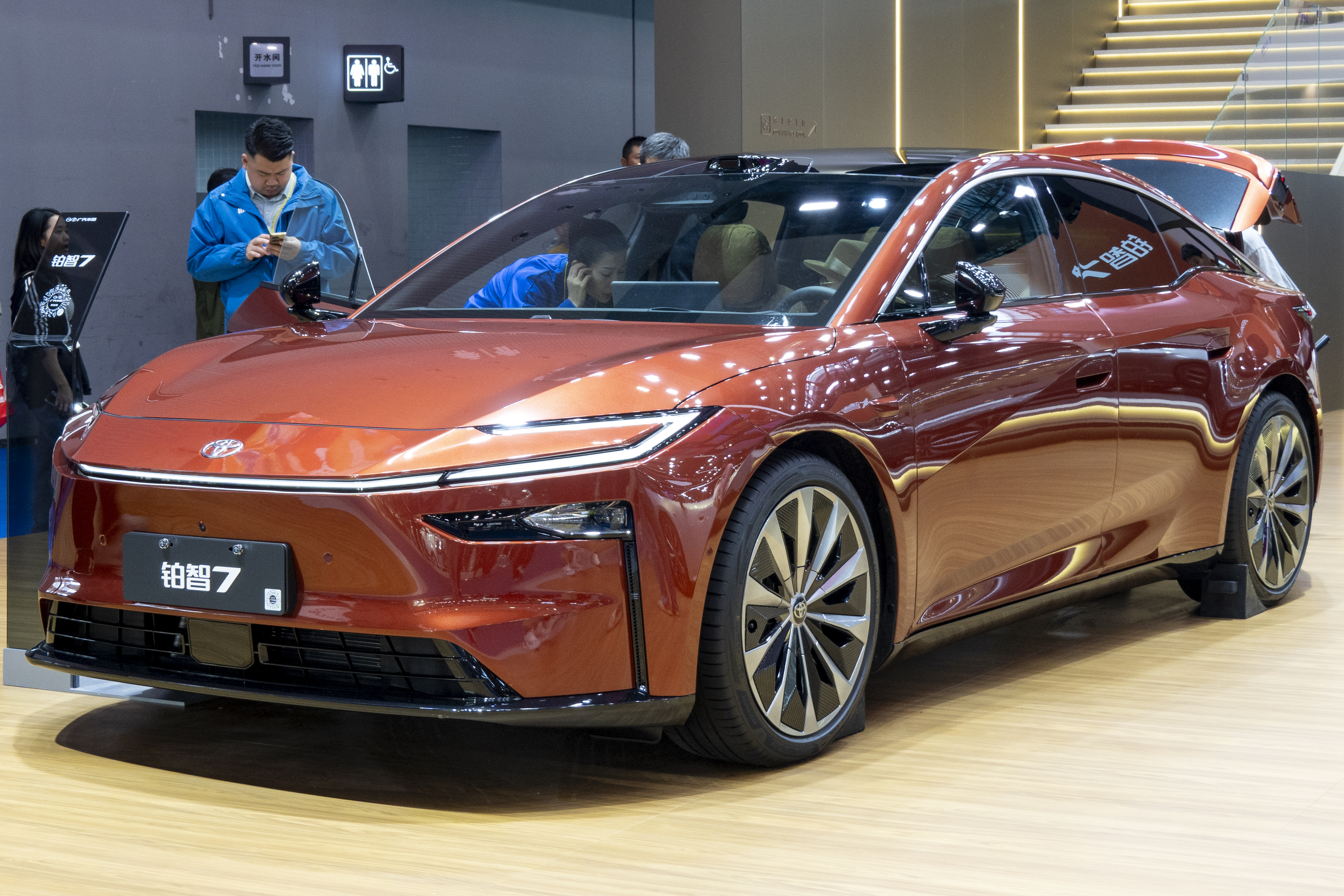
Toyota bZ7

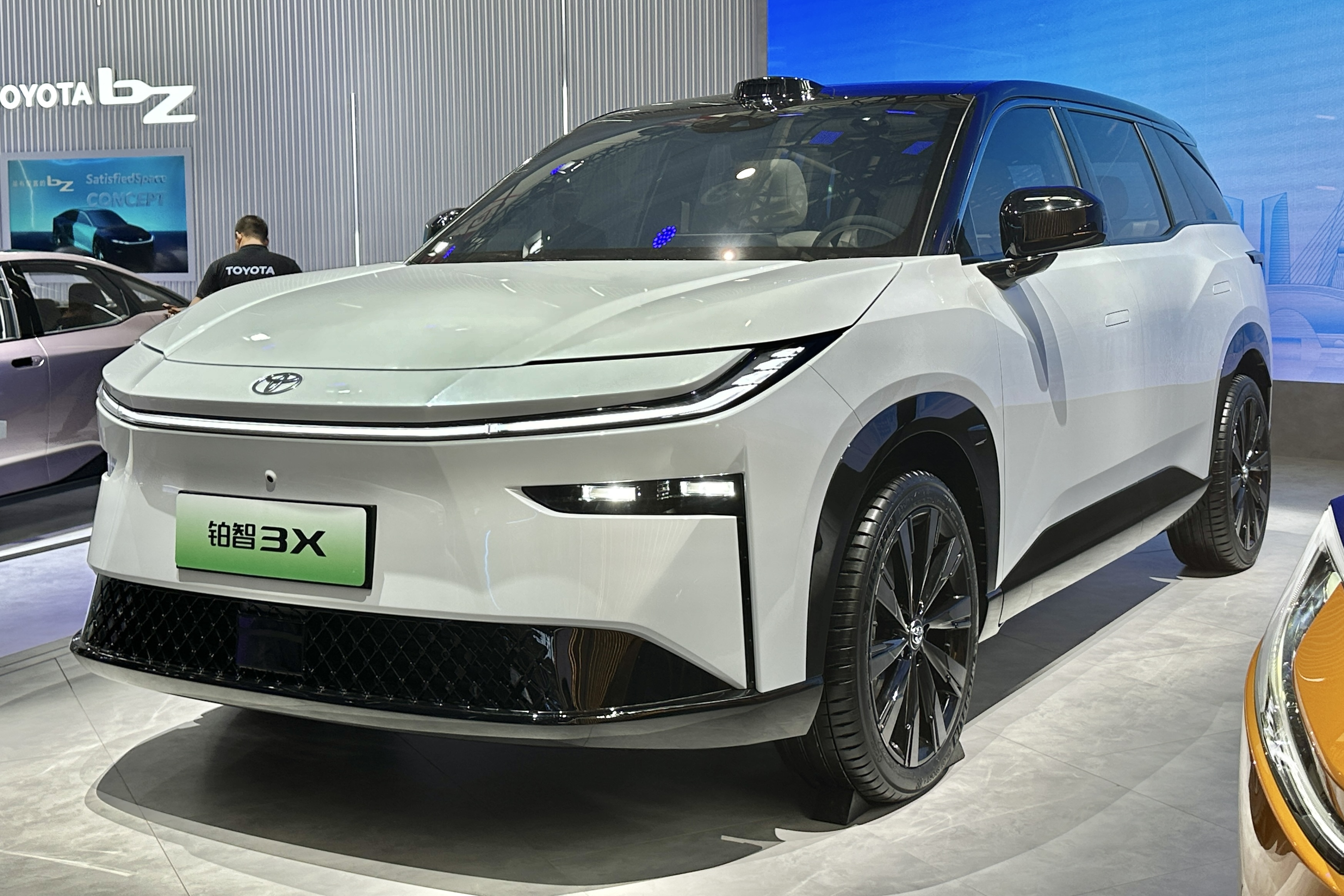
Toyota bZ3X

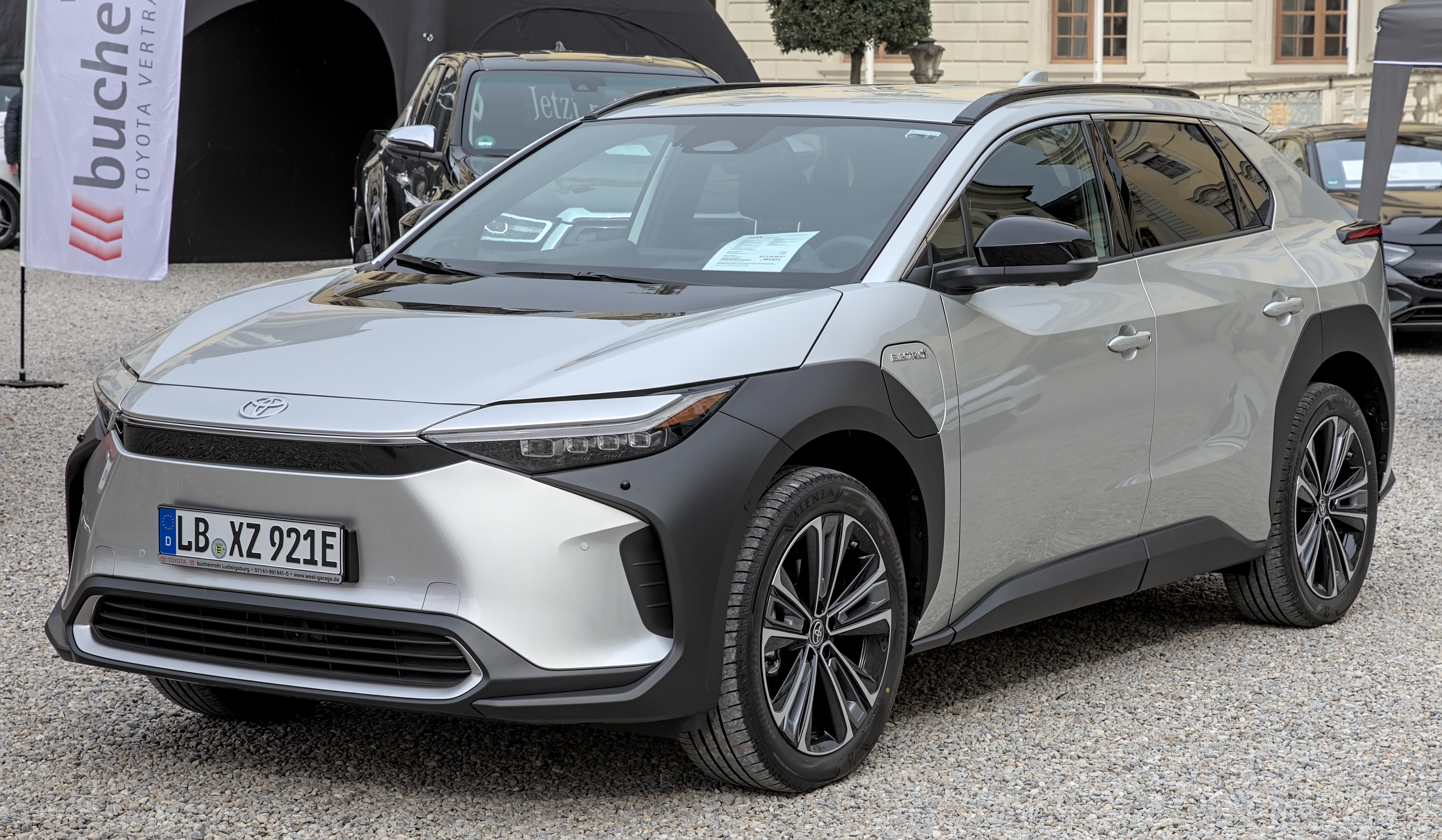
Toyota bZ4X

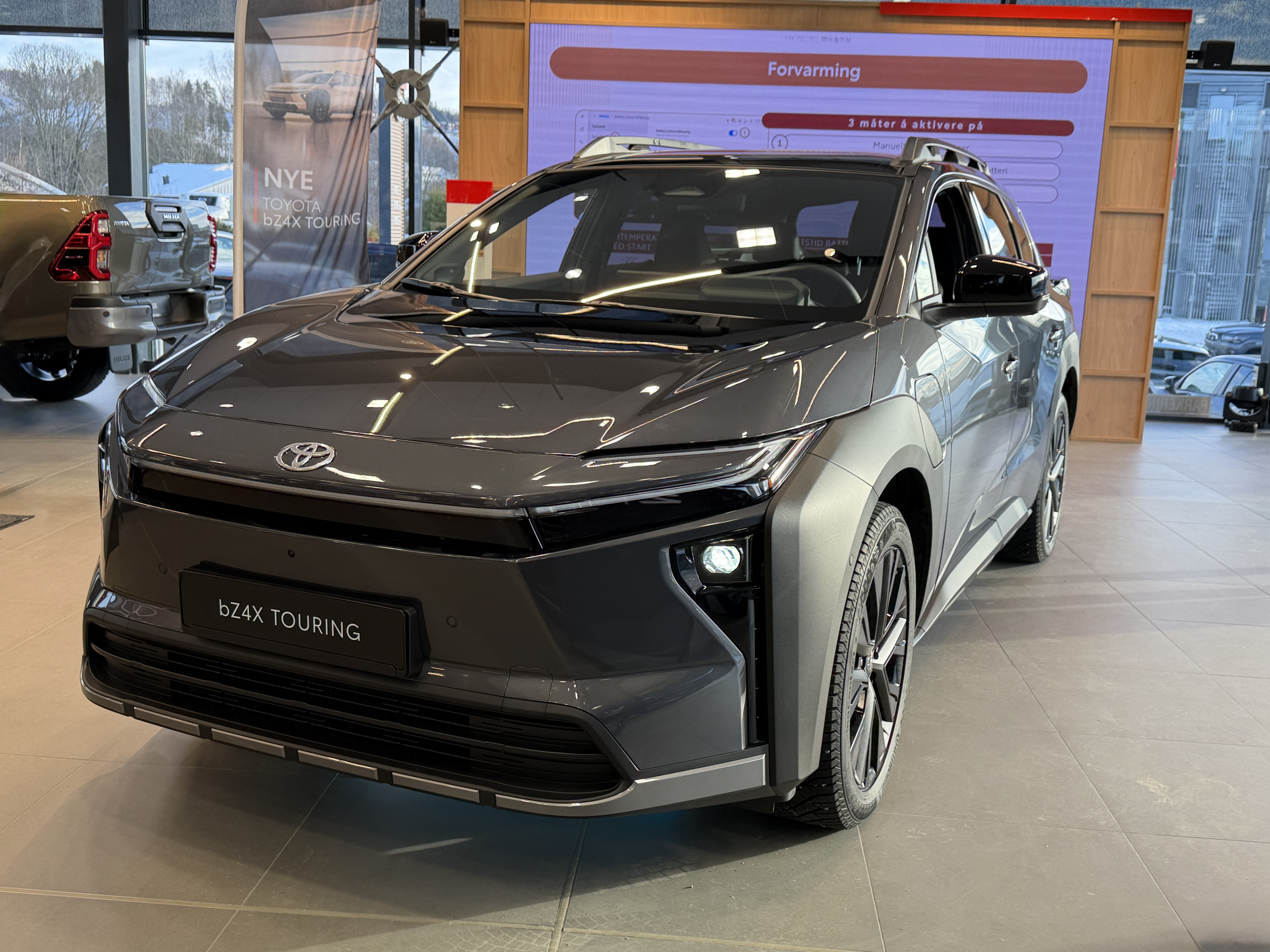
Toyota bZ4X Touring

== Concept models ==
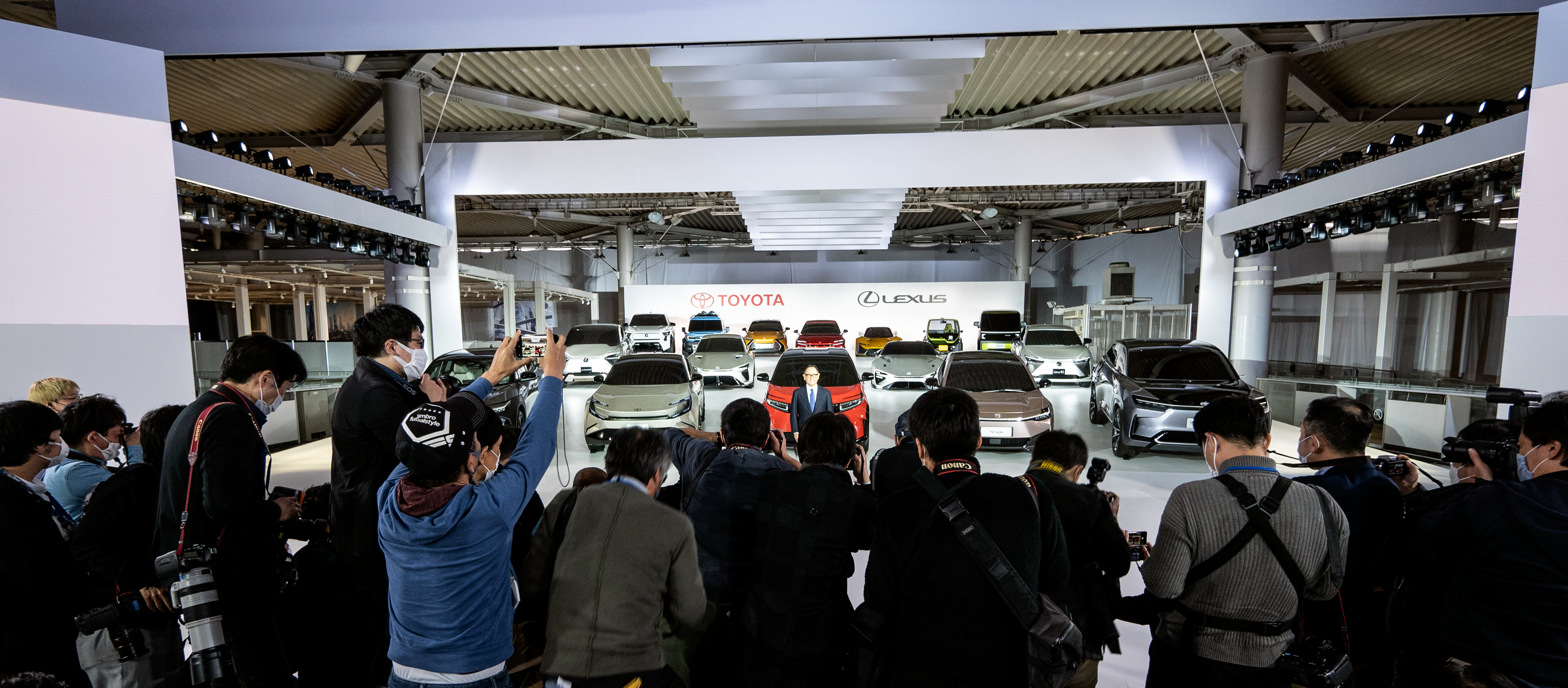
Akio Toyoda shows prototypes of 15 BEVs during Toyota's briefing on BEV strategies in December 2021

In December 2021, Toyota revealed the bZ Compact SUV, bZ Large SUV, bZ Small Crossover, and bZ SDN (sedan) concept vehicles as part of the bZ series. The four bZ concepts were displayed as part of an event that showcased fifteen future Toyota and Lexus battery electric models. The bZ SDN was later revealed as the bZ3 in October 2022. The bZ Large SUV was later revealed as the fifth-generation Highlander in February 2026.

An updated bZ Compact SUV concept was shown at the 2022 Los Angeles Auto Show in November. The production version was unveiled as the C-HR+ in March 2025.

The bZ Sport Crossover Concept and bZ FlexSpace Concept presented at the Auto Shanghai in April 2023.The production version was unveiled as the bZ3C (later renamed to bZ5) and bZ3X at the Beijing Auto Show in April 2024, respectively.

The bZ Satisfied Space Concept presented at the Auto Guangzhou in November 2023. were revealed as bZ7 concept at the Auto Guangzhou 2024. The production version was unveiled as the bZ7 at the Auto Shanghai in April 2025.

The Toyota Urban SUV Concept showcased at Toyota Motor Europe’s Kenshiki forum on 4 December 2023 featured the bZ designation in the rear light signature. The production-ready Urban Cruiser was revealed on 12 December 2024, the first battery electric vehicle (BEV) abandoning the bZ designation.

== See also ==
- List of Toyota vehicles
