= Vladimir Kosterin =

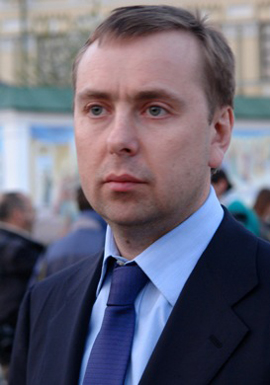
- President of the Risk Reduction Foundation

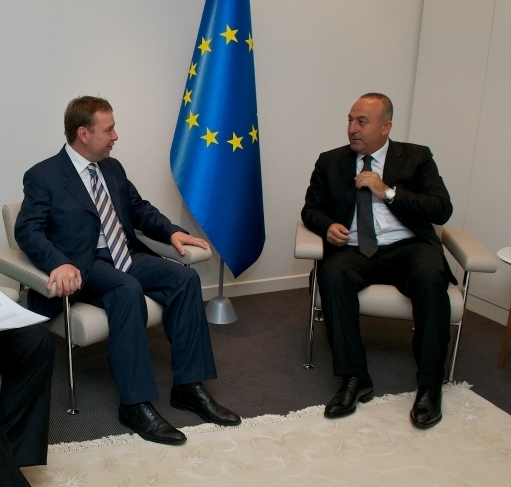
Vladimir Kosterin and the president of PACE Mevlüt Çavuşoğlu (2010-2012)

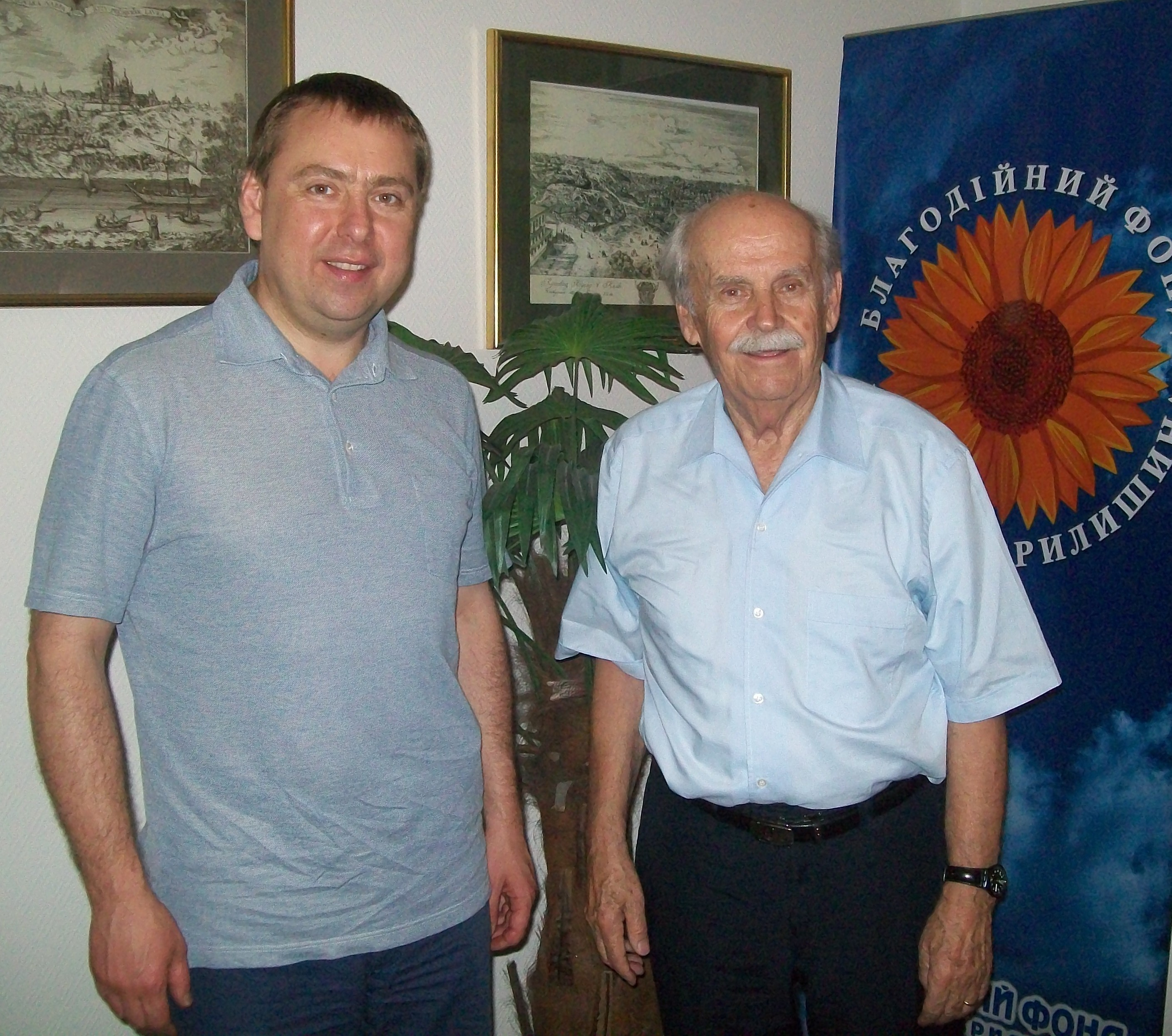
Vladimir Kosterin and a member of the Club of Rome Bohdan Hawrylyshyn

Vladimir Kosterin (born 11 August 1968) is a Ukrainian businessman, currently the president of the Risk Reduction Foundation, an environmental organisation based in Switzerland. He develops business projects in the sphere of media, development and new technologies.

== Education ==
Kosterin received higher education at the Institute of International Relations of Kyiv National Shevchenko University, specialising in international law. He holds a PhD in public administration, with a dissertation topic about the management of social-economic systems of big cities.

== Career ==
From 1995 Kosterin was the President of the Zlagoda International Congress. From 2001 to 2009 he was the President of the Tonis TV channel. From 2006 to 2009 he was the chairman of the Green Party of Ukraine, and from 2006 to 2008 the President of the Boxing Federation of Ukraine. In September 2007 Kosterin established the annual Kyiv International Environmental Forum.

On 16 January 2010 Kosterin established the Risk Reduction Foundation in Geneva, Switzerland. In June 2010 an agreement on cooperation between the Risk Reduction Foundation and the Bohdan Hawrylyshyn charitable foundation was signed, leading to the presentation in Ukraine of a report to the Club of Rome by Gunter Pauli entitled "The Blue Economy: 10 Years, 100 Innovations, 100 million jobs".

In September 2011 Kosterin supported an international forum entitled "Public-Private Partnership in the Sphere of Risk Reduction: The Basis for the Country’s Competitiveness in the 21st Century" in the Ukrainian parliament, also supported by the Parliamentary Assembly of the Council of Europe (PACE).

Vladimir Kosterin is also a member of the Boards of Trustees of SBI "Special Olympics", charitable project "Children’s Hospital of the future" and national scouting organization Plast.
