= Zero emission =

Machinery or process that does not emit pollutants

A zero emission engine, motor, process, or other energy source emits no waste products that pollute the environment or disrupt the climate.

== Zero emission engines ==
Vehicles and other mobile machinery used for transport (over land, sea, air, rail) and for other uses (agricultural, mobile power generation, etc.) contribute heavily to climate change and pollution, so zero emission engines are an area of active research. These technologies almost in all cases include an electric motor powered by an energy source compact enough to be installed in the vehicle. These sources include hydrogen fuel cells, batteries, supercapacitors, and flywheel energy storage devices.

In some cases, such as compressed air engines, the engine may be mechanical rather than electrical. This mechanical engine is then powered by a passive energy source like compressed air, or a combustible non-polluting gas like hydrogen.

The above engines can be used in all vehicles, from cars to boats to propeller airplanes. For boats, energy sources such as nuclear power and solar panels can also be a viable option, in addition to traditional sails and turbosails.

A concept like vegetable oil economy produces emissions.

== See also ==
- Air engine
- Carbon neutrality
- Economics of climate change mitigation
- Zero Emissions Research and Initiatives
- Zero-emissions vehicle
- Zero-energy building
