= Toyota bZ3 =

Battery electric compact sedan for Chinese market

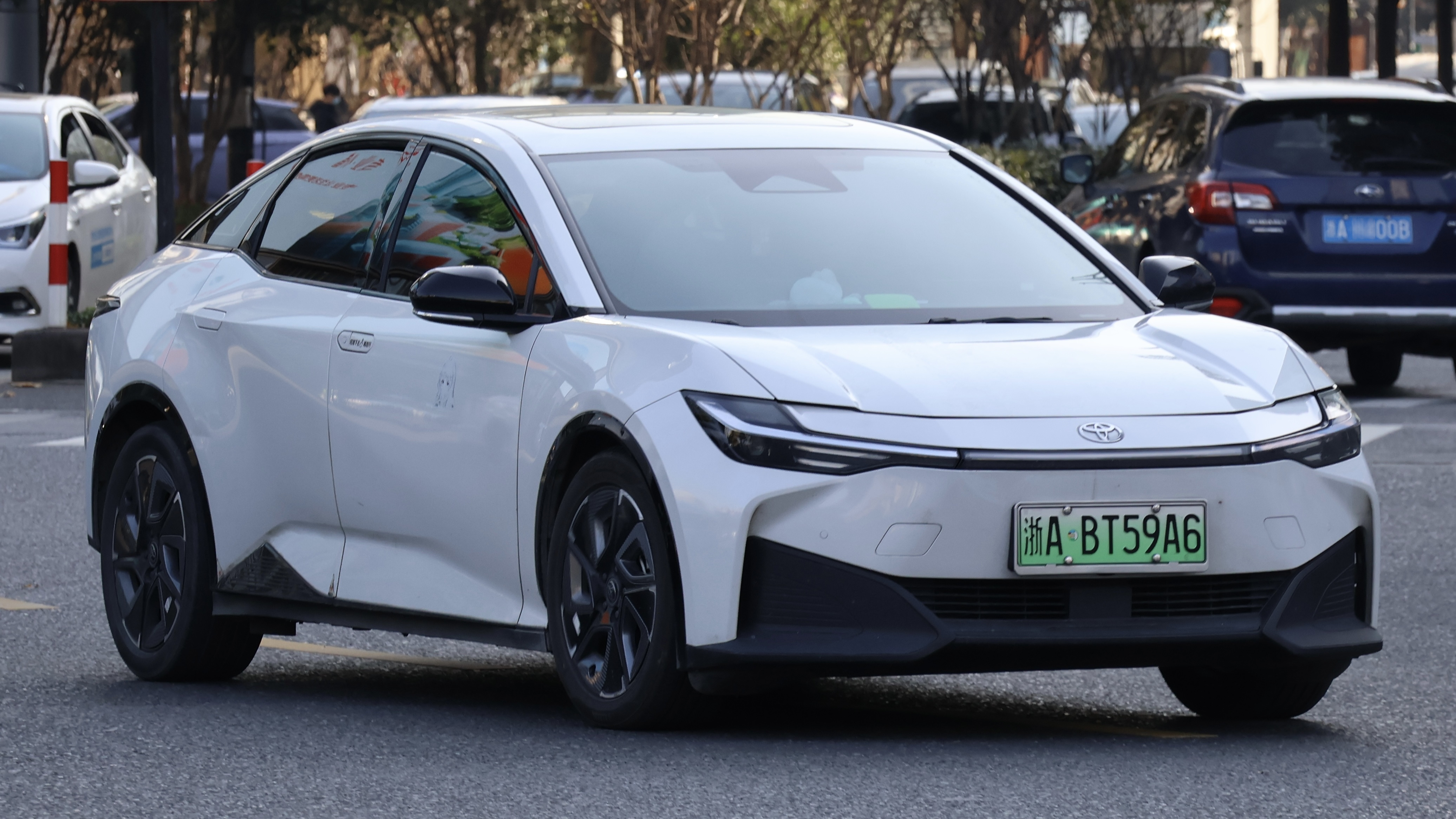
- 2023 Toyota bZ3 (China)

Overview
- Manufacturer: Toyota
- Model code: EA10
- Production: 2023–present
- Assembly: China: Tianjin (FAW Toyota)

Body and chassis
- Class: Compact car
- Body style: 4-door sedan
- Layout: Front-motor, front-wheel-drive
- Platform: e-TNGA
- Related: Toyota bZ4X/bZ / Subaru Solterra

Powertrain
- Electric motor: 1×BYD TZ200-XS002 (BEAM10L)
- Power output: 135–180 kW (181–241 hp; 184–245 PS)
- Battery: 49.9 or 65.3 kWh BYD Blade lithium iron phosphate
- Range: 600 km (375 mi) (claimed)

Dimensions
- Wheelbase: 2,880 mm (113.4 in)
- Length: 4,725 mm (186.0 in)
- Width: 1,835 mm (72.2 in)
- Height: 1,475 mm (58.1 in)
- Kerb weight: 1,710–1,840 kg (3,770–4,057 lb)

The Toyota bZ3 is a battery electric compact sedan jointly developed by Toyota, BYD Auto and FAW Toyota through the BYD Toyota EV Technology (BTET) joint venture and produced in China since 2023. It is the first battery electric sedan by Toyota, and the first sedan from the bZ series.

== Overview ==
The Toyota bZ3 is the second model to be part of the Toyota bZ ("beyond Zero") series of zero-emissions vehicles following the bZ4X crossover SUV, which shares the e-TNGA platform with the bZ3. Before its introduction, the design of the bZ3 was previewed by the bZ SDN concept car in December 2021.

The bZ3 debuted in October 2022 for the Chinese market. It is powered by a blade lithium iron phosphate battery developed by BYD, which offers a claimed 600 km (375 mi) electric range. The drag coefficient is claimed at 0.218 Cd.

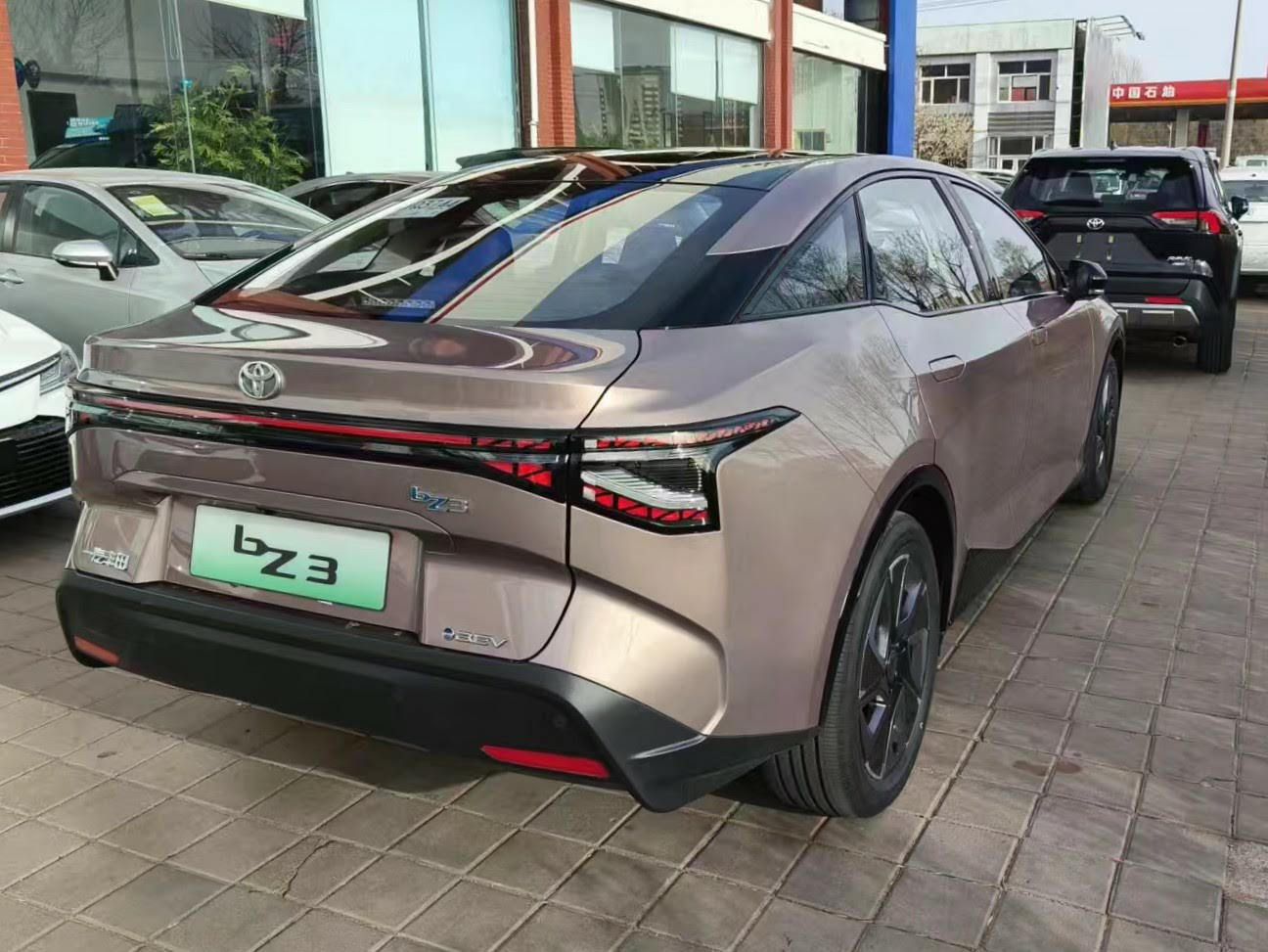
Rear view

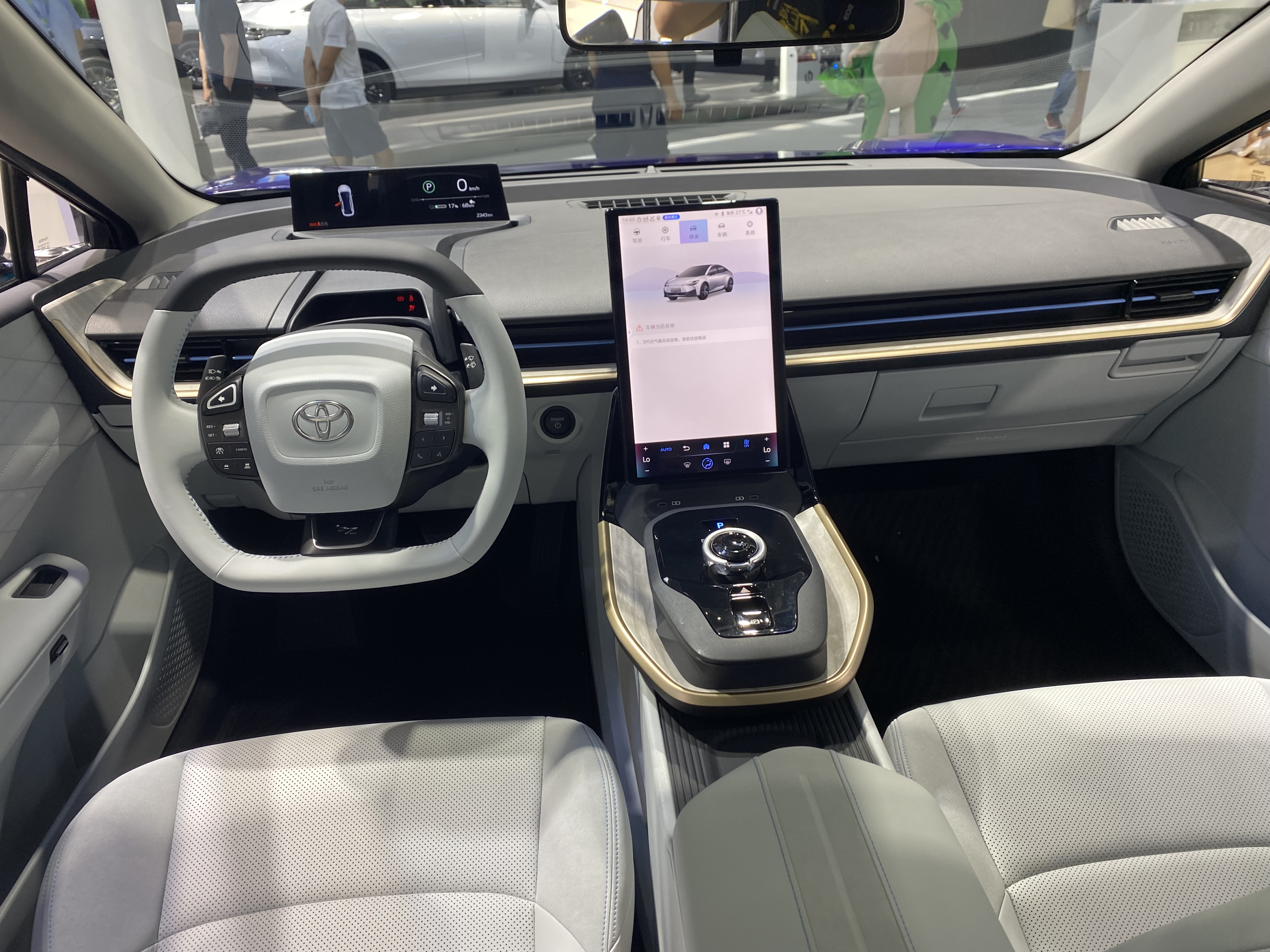
Interior

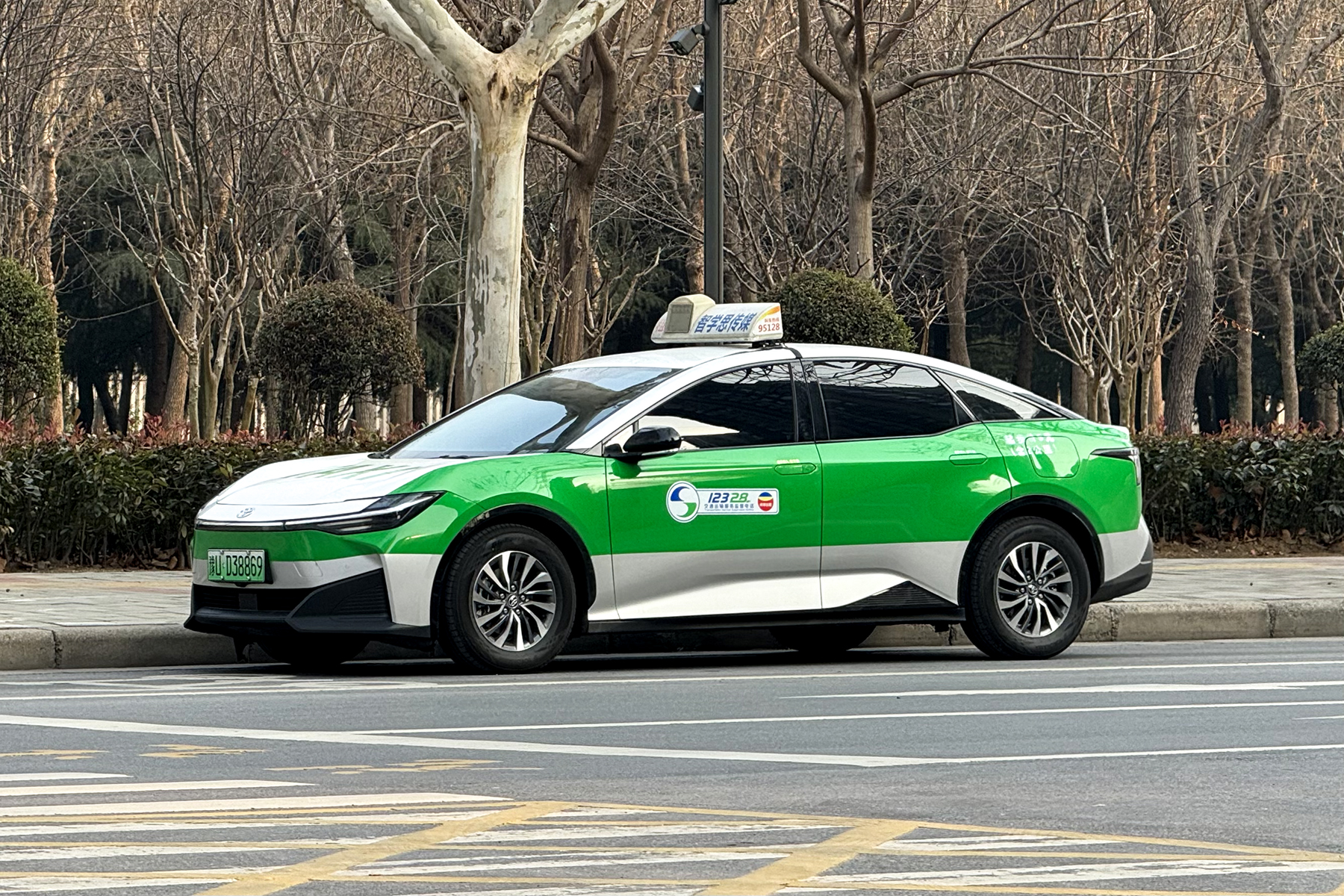
bZ3 taxi in Henan, China

== Sales ==
Year	China
2023	24,038
2024	44,394
2025	27,027

== See also ==
- List of Toyota vehicles
