= Toyota bZ3X =

Battery electric compact crossover SUV

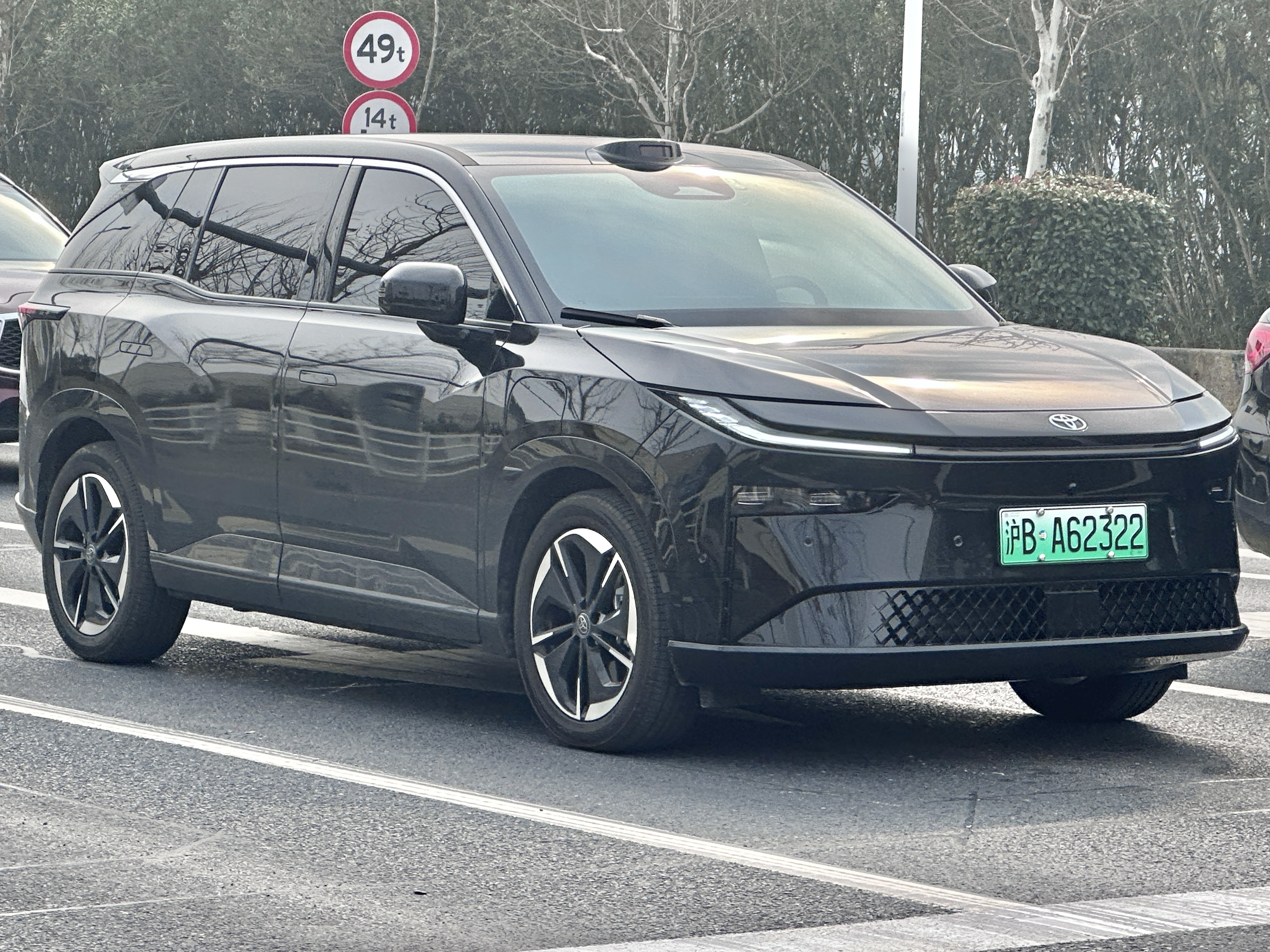

Overview
- Manufacturer: Toyota
- Model code: EG10; AY502 (development code)
- Production: March 2025 – present
- Assembly: China: Guangzhou (GAC Toyota)

Body and chassis
- Class: Compact crossover SUV (C)
- Body style: 5-door SUV
- Layout: Front-motor, front-wheel-drive
- Platform: GAC Aion Architecture Electric Platform (AEP) 3.0
- Related: Aion V (second generation)

Powertrain
- Electric motor: 1× TZ175XSAY501 (YEGM10L)
- Power output: 150 kW (201 hp; 204 PS)
- Battery: 50.03 kWh LFP Magazine Battery; 58 kWh LFP Magazine Battery; 67.9 kWh LFP Magazine Battery
- Electric range: 430–620 km (265–385 mi) (CLTC); 430–610 km (265–380 mi) (NEDC)

Dimensions
- Wheelbase: 2,765 mm (108.9 in)
- Length: 4,600 mm (181.1 in)
- Width: 1,850–1,875 mm (72.8–73.8 in)
- Height: 1,600–1,645 mm (63.0–64.8 in)
- Kerb weight: 1,690–1,760 kg (3,726–3,880 lb)

The Toyota bZ3X (Chinese: 铂智3X; pinyin: Bózhì 3X; lit. 'Platinum 3X') is a battery electric compact crossover SUV produced by Toyota through its joint venture GAC Toyota in China. Forming part of the bZ series, it went on sale in China in March 2025.

== Overview ==
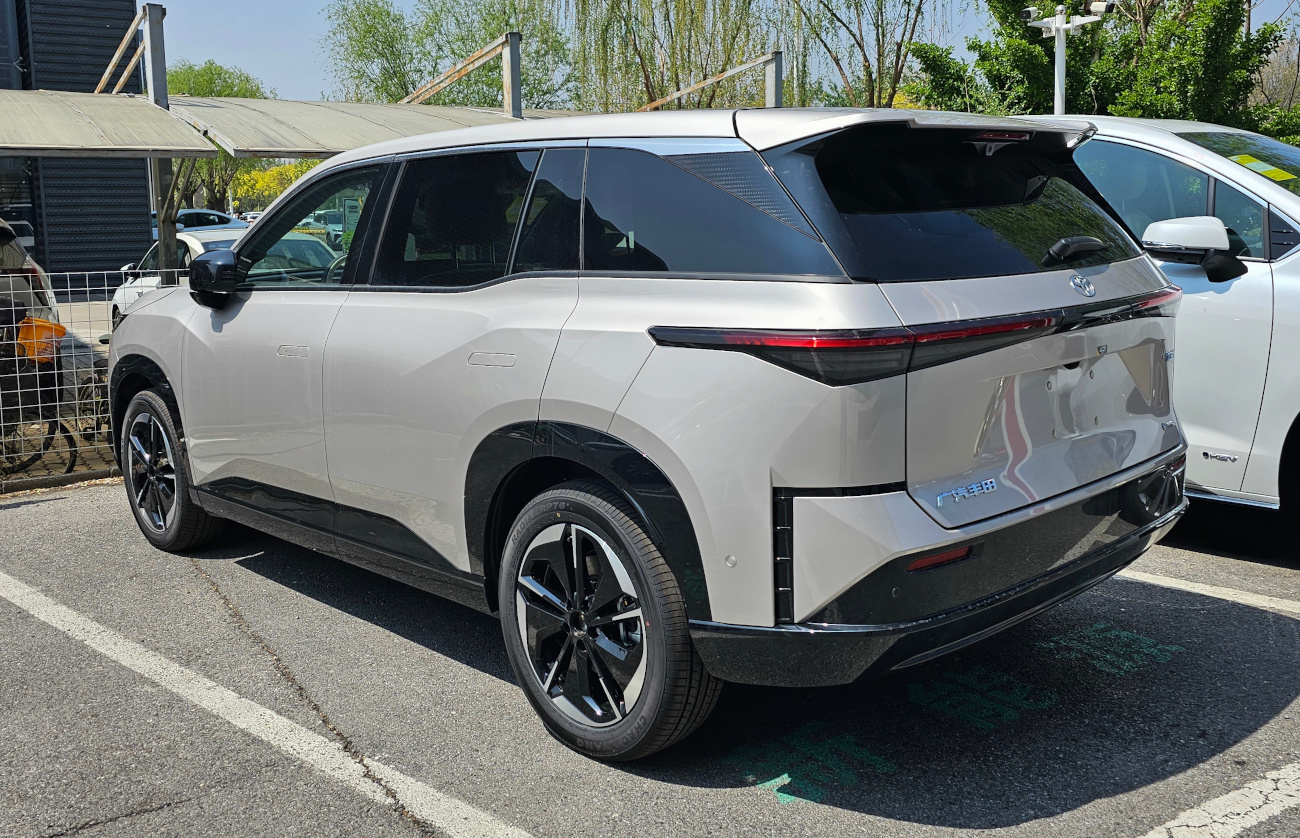
Rear view

The design of the bZ3X was previewed by the bZ FlexSpace Concept in April 2023. The near-production version was introduced at the Beijing Auto Show in April 2024 alongside the bZ5. The bZ3X was jointly developed by Toyota, GAC Group and GAC Toyota.

The bZ3X became available for pre-booking in China in early December 2024. It is available in three grade levels, 430 Air+, 520 Pro+, and 620 Max. It was delivered since March 2025.

The bZ3X was launched in Macau and Hong Kong on 27 September 2025, as the first right-hand drive.

The vehicle adopts an advanced driving assistance system (ADAS) developed by Momenta, marketed as Momenta 5.0. The system is powered by the Nvidia Drive AGX Orin X chip with 254 TOPS (tera operations per second) and utilised 27 sensors, including 11 high-definition cameras, 12 ultrasonic radars, 3 millimeter-wave radars, and a lidar. Over 25 ADAS capabilities are supported, including remote parking. In the interior, the bZ3X came equipped with a 8.8-inch LCD instrument panel, a 14.6-inch central infotainment control screen powered by a Qualcomm Snapdragon 8155 chip, and a 11-speaker Yamaha audio system.

Toyota claims that the bZ3X has an A-class (C-segment) positioning, with a B-class (D-segment) size and a C-class (E-segment) rear cabin space. The vehicle is claimed to provide the largest rear space in its class of 984 mm (38.7 in) and the interior height of 1,215 mm (47.8 in). It is also equipped with a 1.14 m^{2} (12.3 sq ft) panoramic glass roof with electric sunshades.

== Safety ==
C-NCAP (2024) test results Toyota bZ3X 520 Pro+ Intelligent Driving
Category		%
Overall:	5 /5 stars	83.8%
Occupant protection:		90.61%
Vulnerable road users:		72.73%
Active safety:		79.47%

== Sales ==
Year	China
2025	69,032

== See also ==
- List of Toyota vehicles
