= The Blue Economy =

2010 book by Gunter Pauli

The Blue Economy: 10 Years, 100 Innovations, 100 Million Jobs
- First edition
- Author: Gunter Pauli
- Subject: innovation, entrepreneurship, sustainability, environmentalism, philosophy in action
- Genre: non-fiction
- Publisher: Paradigm Publications
- Publication date: 2010
- Publication place: United States
- Media type: Print (Softcover)
- Pages: 386
- ISBN: 978-9-332703-10-0
- Preceded by: Blue economy: 10 years, 100 innovations, 100 million jobs
- Followed by: The Blue Economy 3.0: The Marriage of Science, Innovation and Entrepreneurship Creates a New Business Model That Transforms Society

The Blue Economy: 10 years – 100 innovations – 100 million jobs is a book by Gunter Pauli. The book expresses the ultimate aim that a "Blue Economy business model" will shift society from scarcity to abundance "with what is locally available", by tackling issues that cause environmental and related problems in new ways.

== Contents ==
The book highlights potential benefits in connecting and combining seemingly disparate environmental problems with open-source scientific solutions based upon physical processes common in the natural world, to create solutions that are both environmentally beneficial and which have financial and wider social benefits. The book suggests that we can alter the way in which we run our industrial processes and tackle resultant environmental problems, refocusing from the use of rare and high-energy cost resources to instead seek solutions based upon simpler and cleaner technologies. The book proposes to focus on the generation of more value, instead of blindly cutting costs. The book aims to inspire entrepreneurs to adopt its insights, by demonstrating ways in which this can create economic benefits via job creation, reduced energy use, and more revenue streams from each step of the process, at the same time benefiting the communities involved.

The Blue Economy is presented in 14 chapters, each of which investigates an aspect of the world's economies and offers a series of innovations capable of making aspects of those economies sustainable. By 2014, the book has been translated into 35 languages worldwide.
