= Nina Kosterina =

Soviet partisan and diarist

Nina Kosterina (1921 in Baku – 1941) was a Soviet partisan and diarist. Her father was a journalist. She joined the Komsomol in 1936. In her diary, she described her life from 1936 until her death. She died during a partisan mission which started on 14 November 1941.

== Biography ==
=== Early life ===
Nina Kosterina was born in a revolutionary camp just as the Russian Civil War was ending and the birth of Communism in Russia was getting under way. Her early life mirrored the struggle of millions of Russian citizens as they attempted to stabilize their world. Her father, Alexei Evgrafovich Kosterin, was a Bolshevik agitator who was arrested twice and spent three years in prison for his role in the uprising against the Czar in 1917. He married Anna Mickhailovna sometime between 1918 and 1920. Nina was their first child.

Settled in Moscow by 1922, the Kosterin family proudly supported the new government. Kosterina began her training early as a young Communist, influenced by her family's politics and the infusion of Communist philosophy into the education system. In 1925, the family welcomed a second child—Lelya. During this period, a power struggle was playing out between Soviet leader Vladimir Lenin and two other top leaders, Leon Trotsky and Joseph Stalin. Stalin emerged as the winner. Food was scarce throughout the country and the grand experiment of Communism was undergoing growing pains as Soviet leaders tried to follow Marxist principles but salvage the country's economy.

Kosterina apparently struggled with early learning but persisted in her studies for the next several years, greatly inspired by revolutionary teachings, her "job" as an activist and her love of learning. During this time, she began a diary (at age 15) and was soon after accepted into the Young Communist League known as the Komsomol.

=== Career ===
Kosterina started her diary by calling herself "an ordinary girl." This diary became a window into her world until her death in 1941. From it, she emerged as a strong-headed, reflective, sometimes brooding teen who took herself and the world seriously. She was passionate about the arts and her role as a Young Communist. She wanted to be on a good path as a person and she was honest with herself when she struggled. She also used her diary to chronicle her roller-coaster friendships with a girl named Lena Gershman and a boy named Grisha Grinblat.

In 1936, Kosterina welcomed another sister—Vera—and also said good-bye to her father as he was sent to the Russian Far East on assignment. She would never see him again. While away, Alexei fell out of favor with Stalin's increasingly paranoid government. He was eventually sent to a prison gulag as a "dangerous social element," a fate suffered by many during the worst of the Stalin years. He remained imprisoned throughout World War II.

Kosterina graduated from secondary school in 1939, eager to become a geologist. While she was at a summer geology camp as part of her college training, Germany invaded Russia. Her family evacuated Moscow but she chose to return and volunteer as a student soldier. She parachuted behind enemy lines in November and participated in partisan missions for about a month. Partisan soldiers—men and women—were the “kamikazes” of the Soviet war effort, attacking and harassing the Germans in the territories they now occupied, usually through stealthy night raids. Partisans worked as explosive experts, nurses, radio operators, scouts, information gatherers, and liaisons with the local villagers.

=== Death ===
In January 1942, Kosterina's family received notice that she had perished during a mission in December. For years, the family lacked details about what had happened. Then, a memoir released about soldiers from the war effort found its way to the family and included an official report about her last mission. In the report, a member of the unit described how a band of twenty-two partisans—Kosterina among them—departed on a mission December 19. They slipped behind enemy lines south of Moscow near the cities of Podolsk and Narofominsk. As they went deep into the woods, they fell into a German ambush, tripping a wire that set off an explosion. Fifteen partisans, including Kosterina, died. The surviving seven ended their mission and returned to their base camp to report the attack. The goal of their mission was not shared.

After the war, Kosterina's mother and sisters returned to Moscow and found her diary tucked away in their apartment. They kept it safe and later gave it to Alexei for safe-keeping once he was released from Stalin's prisons in 1955. The diary stayed private until 1962, when the family allowed a Soviet magazine to publish it. This was possible only because the new Soviet leader, Nikita Khrushchev, began allowing citizens to talk more openly about their experiences during the Stalin years. Many journals, diaries and memoirs started to emerge. Two years later, Kosterina's diary was released in Russian book form. Then, in 1968, it was released in English by American publisher, Crown Books. It became a bestseller.

Alexei, who remained out of favor even with the new government due to his activism, died in 1968. Kosterina's mother died in 1974. Kosterina's youngest sister, Vera, died in 1997. As of 2004, her other sister, Lelya (also known as Elena), was still living in Moscow.

== Sources ==
- Ginsburg, Mirra. Translator. The Diary of Nina Kosterina, Crown Books, 1968.
- Phillips, Jennifer. Nina Kosterina: A Young Communist in Stalinist Russia, Write Words Inc. (ebook) and Nose in a Book Publishing (paperback), 2010
