= Zero Emissions Research and Initiatives =

Zero Emissions Research and Initiatives (ZERI) is a decentralized global network founded by Gunter Pauli in 1994 at the UNU after receiving support from the Japanese government. Initially headquartered at the UNDP in Geneva, and later at IUCN in Gland, ZERI operates as a decentralized network with 34 project offices worldwide.

== History ==
ZERI participated in the World Expo in 2000 at Hanover, Germany. It was reported that the network constructed a pavilion almost entirely from Guadua.

In 2009, the Specialty Coffee Association of America recognized ZERI for a 15-year project in Colombia. This project collaborated with coffee farms to utilize unharvested coffee plant materials and trimmings to grow Shiitake mushrooms and was estimated to have created approximately 10,000 jobs.

The Zero Emissions Commitment (ZEC) is a concept in climate science that explores how Earth's system processes may evolve after achieving net zero carbon dioxide (CO_{2}) emissions and the potential effects on global surface temperatures.

== ZERI International Board ==
The board consists of the following people:

- The Rt Hon Anders Wijkman (Sweden)
- Prof. Dr. Ashok Khosla (India)
- Prof. Dr. Heitor Gurgulino de Souza (Brazil)
- Prof. Dr. Jorge Reynolds Pombo (Colombia)
- Prof. Yasuhiro Sakakibara (Japan)
