= Alexei Kosterin =

Soviet writer

Alexei Yevgrafovich Kosterin (Russian: Алексей Евграфович Костерин; 17 March 1896 – 10 November 1968) was a Soviet writer, Bolshevik, Gulag survivor, and prominent campaigner for civil rights in the USSR in the 1950s and 1960s.

== Early life ==
Kosterin was born in Saratov province, in Russia, the son of a skilled metal worker. He became involved in the revolutionary movement at the age of 16, following the example of his two older brothers, and spent three years in prison. He joined the Bolsheviks in 1916. His parents also joined the Bolsheviks, in 1918. After the Bolshevik Revolution, Kosterin was sent to organise partisan detachments in the North Caucasus. Captured by the White Army of General Denikin, he managed to escape, under fire, into Chechnya. He was appointed military commissar for Chechnya in 1920, then secretary of the Kabardinian regional party committee. He lived in Moscow from 1922, working as a writer and journalist, and published his first collection of short stories in 1924. In 1930, he took part in breaking an ice jam in the Northern Dvina river, near Kotlas in Arkhangelsk province, In 1936–38, he worked in Magadan, in Siberia, on the newspaper 'Soviet Kolyma'.

== Arrest and persecution ==
Kosterin was arrested on May 6, 1938, accused of being a "socially dangerous element", and sentenced to five years in a labour camp, which he served in Kolyma. He stayed there as a civilian workers for two years, after completing his sentence, and lived in Rostov and Saratov provinces until after the death of Stalin in 1953, when he returned to Moscow. In 1955, he was readmitted to membership of the Communist Party of the Soviet Union (CPSU). He started campaigning on behalf of Chechens, Crimean Tatars and other small nations who had been subjected to mass deportation during the war, for which he was expelled from the CPSU in 1958, but later readmitted.

In 1967, Kosterin became the central figure in a little group of dissidents, who included General Petro Grigorenko, Ivan Yakhimovich. In February 1968, when communist parties from across Europe met for a conference in Budapest, Kosterin was the lead signatory of an open letter accusing the Soviet government of violating human rights, adding that:

There are several thousand political prisoners, about whom almost no one knows, are in camps and prisons. They are kept in inhuman conditions of forced labour, on a semi-starvation diet, exposed to the arbitrary actions of the administration. After they complete their sentences they are still subjected to extrajudicial and frequently illegal persecution."

In August 1968, he co-signed a protest against the Warsaw Pact invasion of Czechoslovakia. He was summoned to a meeting of the Moscow communist party, but did not attend because he had just suffered a second heart attack, and was expelled from the CPSU, for the third time, in his absence. He responded with a letter saying he was resigning from the party, but "I am, and will remain, a Marxist-Leninist Communist, a Bolshevik."

Kosterin died on 16 November 1968. His funeral turned into a demonstration against Soviet rule, by 18 participants.

== Family ==
Kosterin's older brother, Mikhail, a Bolshevik and one of the first graduates of the Institute of Red Professors was shot in 1937. His mother, and other brother, Vasili, were expelled from the CPSU. Vasili soon died. Their father starved to death.

Kosterin and his wife Vera had two daughters, Elena and Nina. Nina Kosterina, was killed in the war. Her diaries, published posthumously in 1964, was a literary sensation. Elena Kosterina married a war veteran, Oleg Smirnov, who was arrested in 1952 and sent to labour camp in Komsomolsk-on-Amuralso campaigned for civil rights, for which she was expelled from the CPSU in May 1972, during a meeting in which a spokesman from a higher party committee told her: "You have recalled your father, who was convicted in 1937. Well, he was rightly convicted." She was sacked from her job soon afterwards. She died in August 2017. Later she was head of the USSR State Quarantine Inspection for Plant Protection. Her son, Alexei, born in 1951, also joined the civil rights movement. He was 18 years old at the time of his interrogation by the KGB, and in 1982 was sentenced to six years in a labour camp, but was released in 1987.
