= Kosterin's House =

- Дом Костерина (Russian)
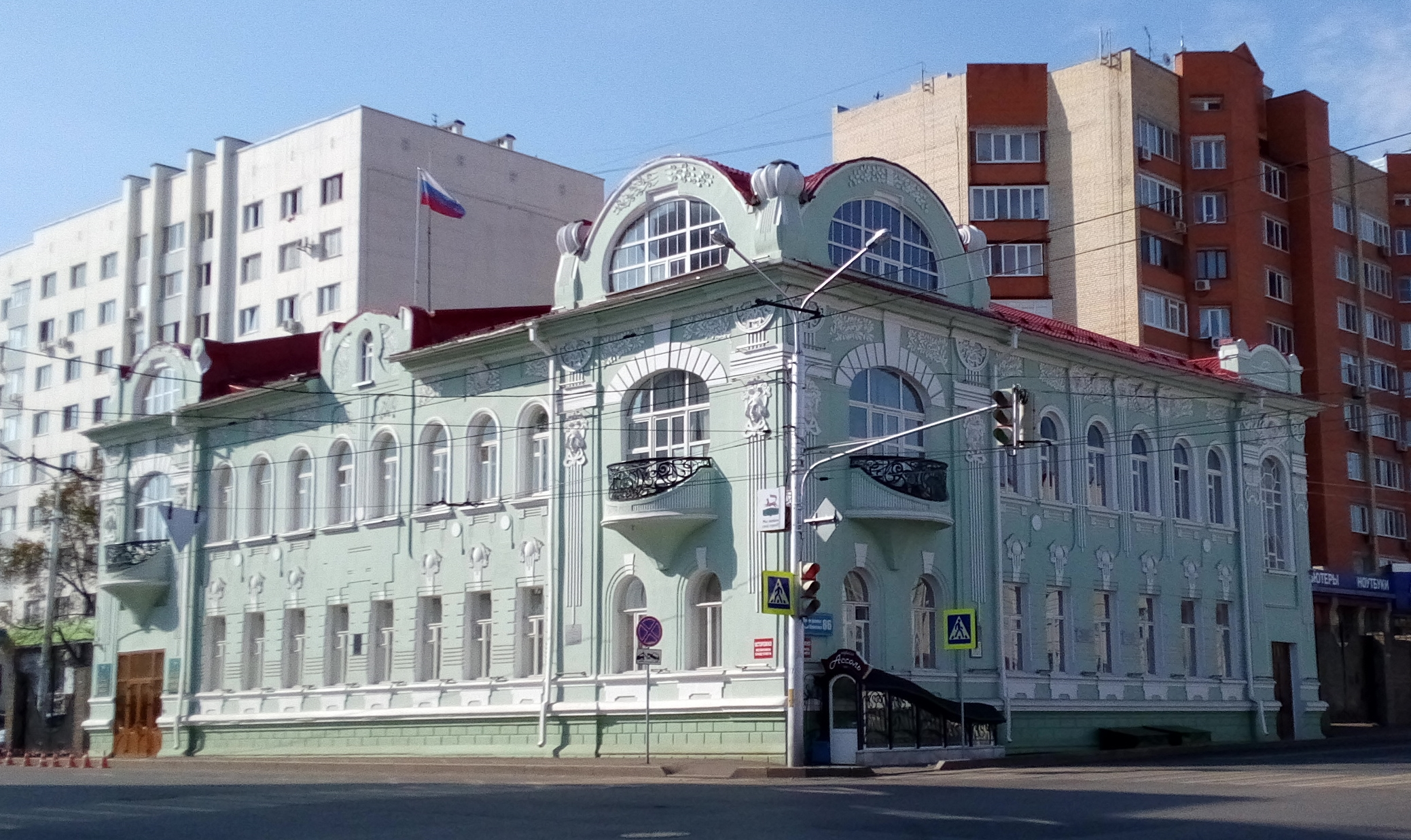
- Kosterin's House, 2015
- Interactive map of Kosterin's House
- 54°43′21″N 55°56′20″E
- Type: Mansion / office
- Location: Ulitsa Pushkina, 86; Ufa, Bashkortostan, 450076; Russia

History
- Built: 1907 or 1912

Site notes
- Architectural style: Russian Art Nouveau
- Owner: Federal Customs Service of Russia (Bashkortostan)

Kosterin's House (Russian: Дом Костерина, romanized: Dom Kosterina) is an historic Russian Art Nouveau former mansion on the corner of Pushkina and Karl Marx Streets, Ufa, Bashkortostan, Russia. Built in either 1907 or 1912 for merchant Pavel Kosterin, the building was occupied during the Russian Civil War by the White Army. Following the Bolshevik takeover, it was used by various government departments and institutions. Since 1997, it has housed the Bashkortostan office of the Federal Customs Service of Russia.

== History ==
Pavel Kosterin is said to have arrived in Ufa from Samara in around 1890. In 1898 the City of Ufa leased him a store in a shopping arcade; he used it to trade various wares. In 1900, Kosterin and his business partner S. A. Chernikov leased, and started operating, a state-owned three-storey steam mill on Sofronovskaya Pier. In 1902 they rented part of the pier for 12 years to build warehouses to store grain, timber, and the materials necessary to run the mill, and also to build facilities for trading grains and other products. Additionally, they obtained permission to have ships, steamers and barges berth at the quay, and installed a pipe to supply oil.

Kosterin became one of the wealthiest people in the city and the province. He also married Yekaterina, one of Ufa's richest heiresses, and took on various official posts in government and commerce.

Early in the 20th century, Kosterin bought two estates at the corner of Pushkinskaya Street and Aleksandrovskaya Street (now Karl Marx Street), demolished the wooden houses there, and replaced them with a luxurious three-storey stone mansion, costing him around 30 thousand rubles. The mansion was among the first of Ufa's houses to be equipped with central heating; its boiler room was in the basement.

The architect of the mansion is not known, but according to one source it was obviously either Konstantin Guskov or A. A. Shcherbachyov. Some sources claim that it was completed in 1907; others assert that completion was in 1912.

In the spring of 1919, during the Russian Civil War, the building became the military headquarters of Admiral Alexander Kolchak, the "Supreme Leader and Commander-in-Chief of All Russian Land and Sea Forces" (the White movement). From June 1919, following the capture of Ufa by the Red Army, the building housed the political department of the 25th Rifle Division, under the command of Vasily Chapayev. In the courtyard, the Bolsheviks executed hostages and ordinary Ufa citizens suspected of assisting the White forces.

Later, the building was occupied by the military registration and enlistment office, the Ministry of Agriculture, and, from 1983, the Research Institute of Livestock. Since 1997 it has housed the Bashkortostan office of the Federal Customs Service of Russia.

== Architecture ==
Kosterin's House is Ufa's most striking example of Russian Art Nouveau architecture. Due to its angular location, with front façades overlooking both Pushkina and Karl Marx Streets, the building is U-shaped, with two entrances. Although the building is attributed to Pushkina Street, the main entrance and the main façade overlook Karl Marx Street. At the corner of the two streets, an elliptical attic with a similarly shaped window is highlighted with a bright accent.

The festive external appearance of the building is due to its Art Nouveau mouldings, intertwining decorations, elliptical attic and elegant bas-reliefs. The two front façades feature rich and original decor with pronounced manifestations of the Art Nouveau style: smooth curved lines repeated in window openings, balcony framings, and in the winding lines of the openwork ornament of balconies and friezes. Particularly expressive are the various forms and finishes of the attic, the platbands and the locks of window openings, plaster macaroons, niches with stucco decorations and other elements.

The two entrances are decorated with vertical partitioning of the wall, complex parapets and large windows. Inside, on the ground floor, are luxurious halls interconnected with enfilade suites. The halls feature moulded stucco ceilings, heavy oak doors 3 m (9.8 ft) high, and cast-iron patterned staircases with chiseled notch boards. The staircases were produced by Gutman; one of them (the northern one) remains fully intact.
