= Toyota bZ5 =

Battery electric compact crossover SUV

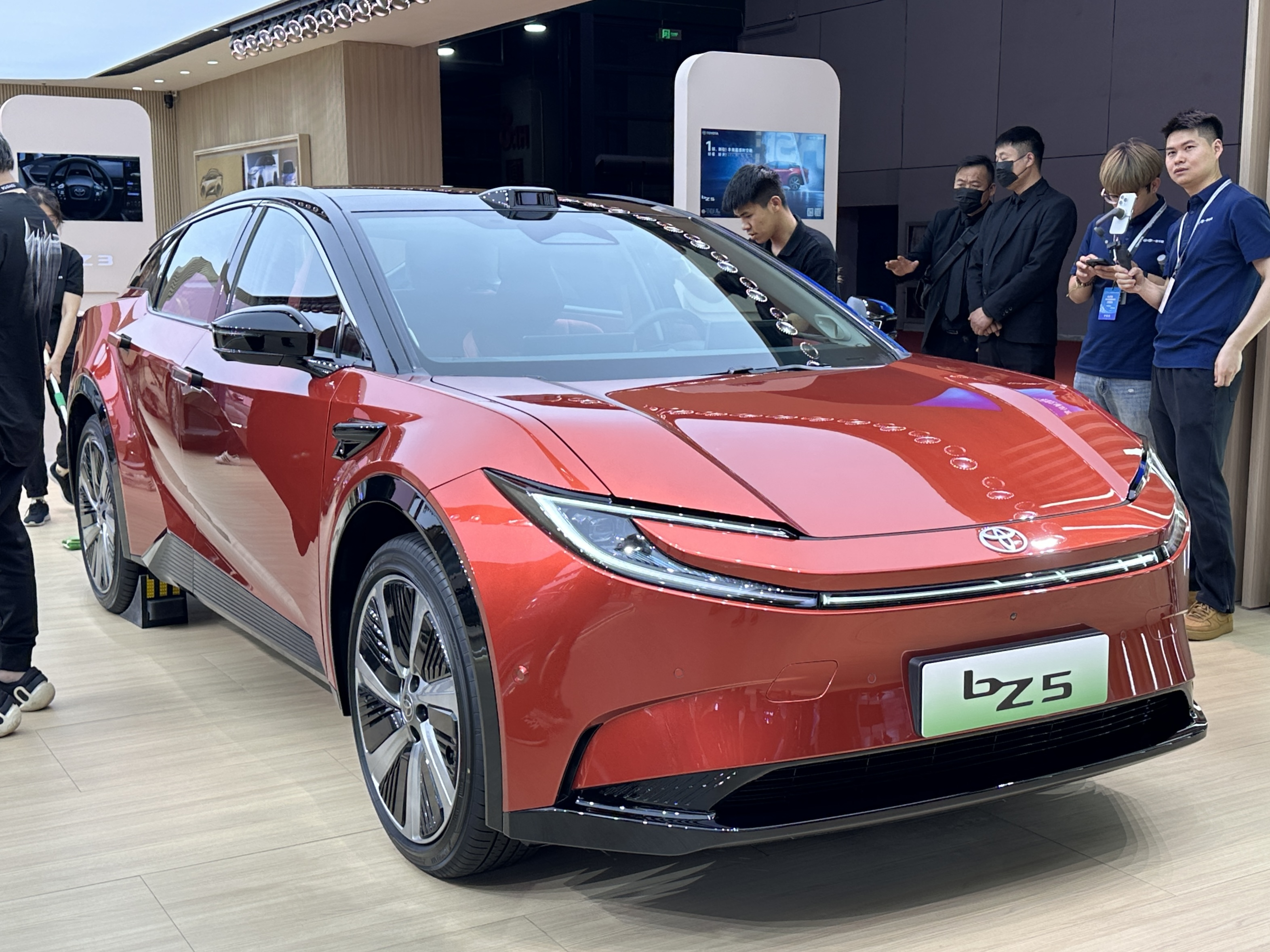

Overview
- Manufacturer: Toyota
- Model code: EA11
- Also called: Toyota bZ3C (pre-production)
- Production: May 2025 – present
- Assembly: China: Tianjin (FAW Toyota)

Body and chassis
- Class: Compact crossover SUV (C)
- Body style: 5-door coupe SUV
- Layout: Front-motor, front-wheel-drive
- Platform: e-TNGA
- Related: Toyota bZ4X

Powertrain
- Electric motor: 1×BYD TZ200-XS003 (BEAG11L)
- Power output: 200 kW (268 hp; 272 PS)
- Battery: 65.28 or 73.98 kWh FinDreams Blade LFP
- Range: 550–630 km (340–390 mi) (CLTC)

Dimensions
- Wheelbase: 2,880 mm (113.4 in)
- Length: 4,780 mm (188.2 in)
- Width: 1,866 mm (73.5 in)
- Height: 1,510 mm (59.4 in)
- Kerb weight: 1,920–2,020 kg (4,233–4,453 lb)

The Toyota bZ5 is a battery electric compact crossover SUV produced by Toyota through the FAW Toyota joint venture in China. Forming part of the bZ series, it went on sale in May 2025.

== Overview ==
The design of the bZ5 was previewed by the bZ Sport Crossover Concept in April 2023. It was jointly developed by Toyota, BYD Auto (via BYD Toyota EV Technology (BTET)) and FAW Toyota.

The near-production version was introduced at the Beijing Auto Show in April 2024 as bZ3C alongside the bZ3X. The production model was released in Shanghai Motor Show in April 2025, and was renamed to bZ5. The power comes from a 272 PS and 330 Nm front motor and a BYD supplied Blade LFP battery that charges from 30 to 80% state of charge in 27 minutes. The maximum CLTC range is 630 km.

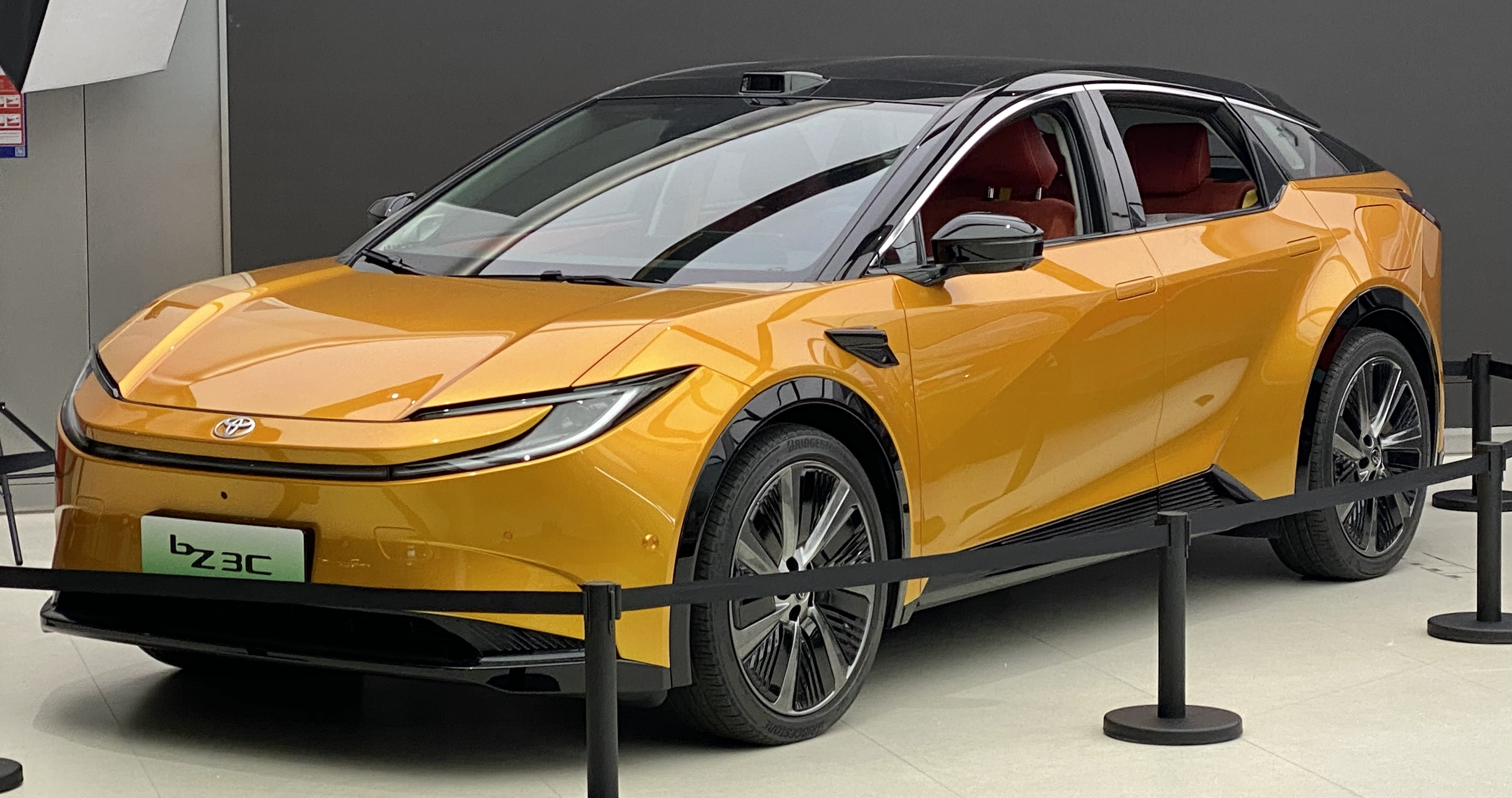
Toyota bZ3C (near-production model)

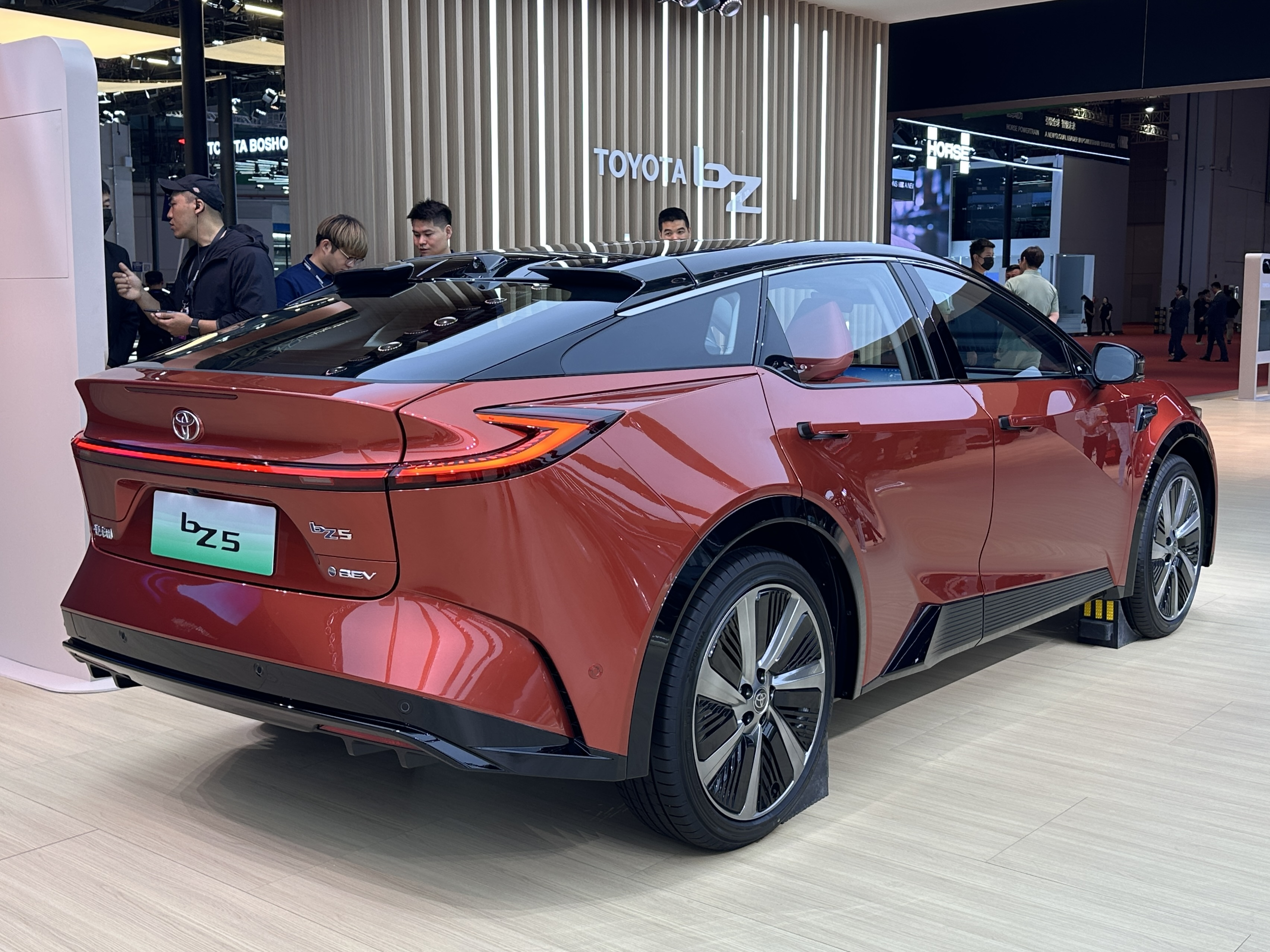
Rear view

== Sales ==
Year	China
2025	10,564

== See also ==
- List of Toyota vehicles
