= Gunter Pauli =

Belgian businessman, economist and author

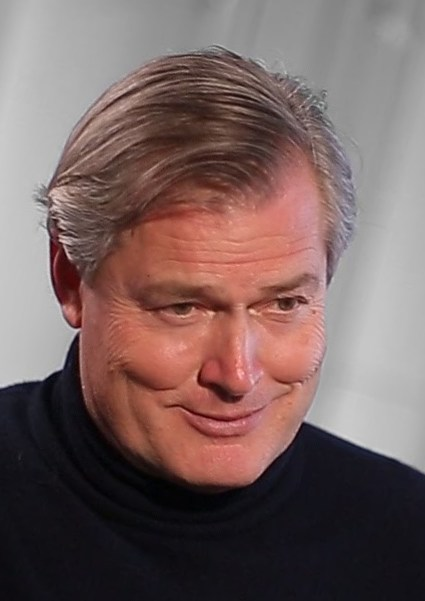
- Born: 3 March 1956 (age 70); Antwerp, Belgium.
- Education: University of Antwerp; INSEAD
- Occupations: Entrepreneur; Economist; Author
- Known for: The Blue Economy
- Children: 6 (five sons and one daughter)
- Website: Official website

Gunter Pauli is an entrepreneur, economist, and author born in 1956 in Antwerp (Belgium). He is best known for his main work, The Blue Economy.

He has lived on 4 continents, is fluent in 7 languages, is a resident of Japan since 1994 and spends most of his time in South Africa.

== Biography ==
Gunter Pauli holds a degree in economics from the University of Antwerp in 1979 and an MBA from INSEAD at Fontainebleau in 1982.

Pauli’s entrepreneurial activities span culture, science, politics, business and the environment. He is also a member of The Club of Rome and served three years since 2017 as an elected member of the Executive Committee. Gunter Pauli has served as an advisor for governments in Spain, Argentina and Italy.

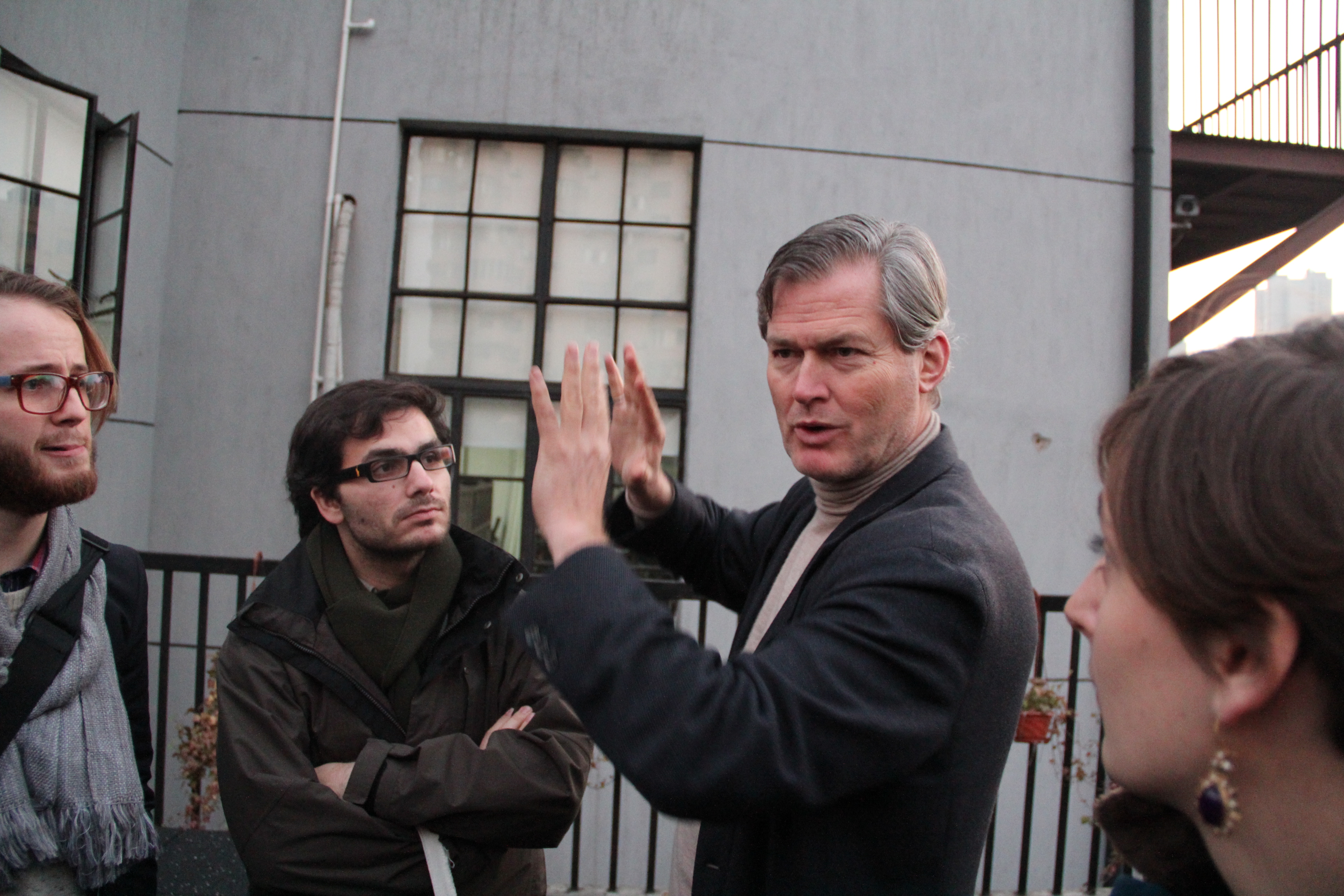
Gunter Pauli visiting Shanghai, Blue Economy-10 Years 100 Innovations 100 Mil Jobs, November 2012

He has also worked as an author, notably of The Blue Economy. He assisted Aurelio Peccei, founder of the Club of Rome from 1979 to 1984 and later wrote a biography about him.

In 1989 he was elected as an independent substitute to the European Parliament, but never took up the seat.

Former chairman of Ecover, an ecological detergent company, before realizing in 1990 that its components – palm oil in particular – destroy primary forests, he is nicknamed the "Steve Jobs of sustainable development", or even the "Che Guevara of biodiversity ”, or “the apostle of sustainable growth ”.

== Blue Economy ==
Gunter Pauli is committed to design and implement a competitive business model which respond to people’s needs using what is locally available. He introduced “The Blue Economy” philosophy in 1994 when asked by the United Nations to reflect on the business models of the future in preparation for COP 3 in Japan where the Kyoto Protocol was decided.

== ZERI (Zero Emission Research Initiatives) ==
In 1994 Pauli founded the Zero Emissions Research Initiative (ZERI).

== Controversy ==
In particular, the ZERI Foundation signed an agreement in 2016 with the Chamber of Commerce and Industry (CCI) of Quimper to develop the concept of blue economy on the territory of the CCI. The CCI thus planned to pay €500,000 to the foundation for the identification and development of projects and job creation on the territory. In July 2018, the CCI announced the end of the agreement with the Foundation, questioning the content of the service provided by the Foundation.

In 2020 he made the headlines in the Italian press for controversial statements on the coronavirus, including those – lacking scientific evidence – that see the 5G network connected to the Covid-19 epidemic.
