= Toyota Avalon =

Full-size car produced by Toyota

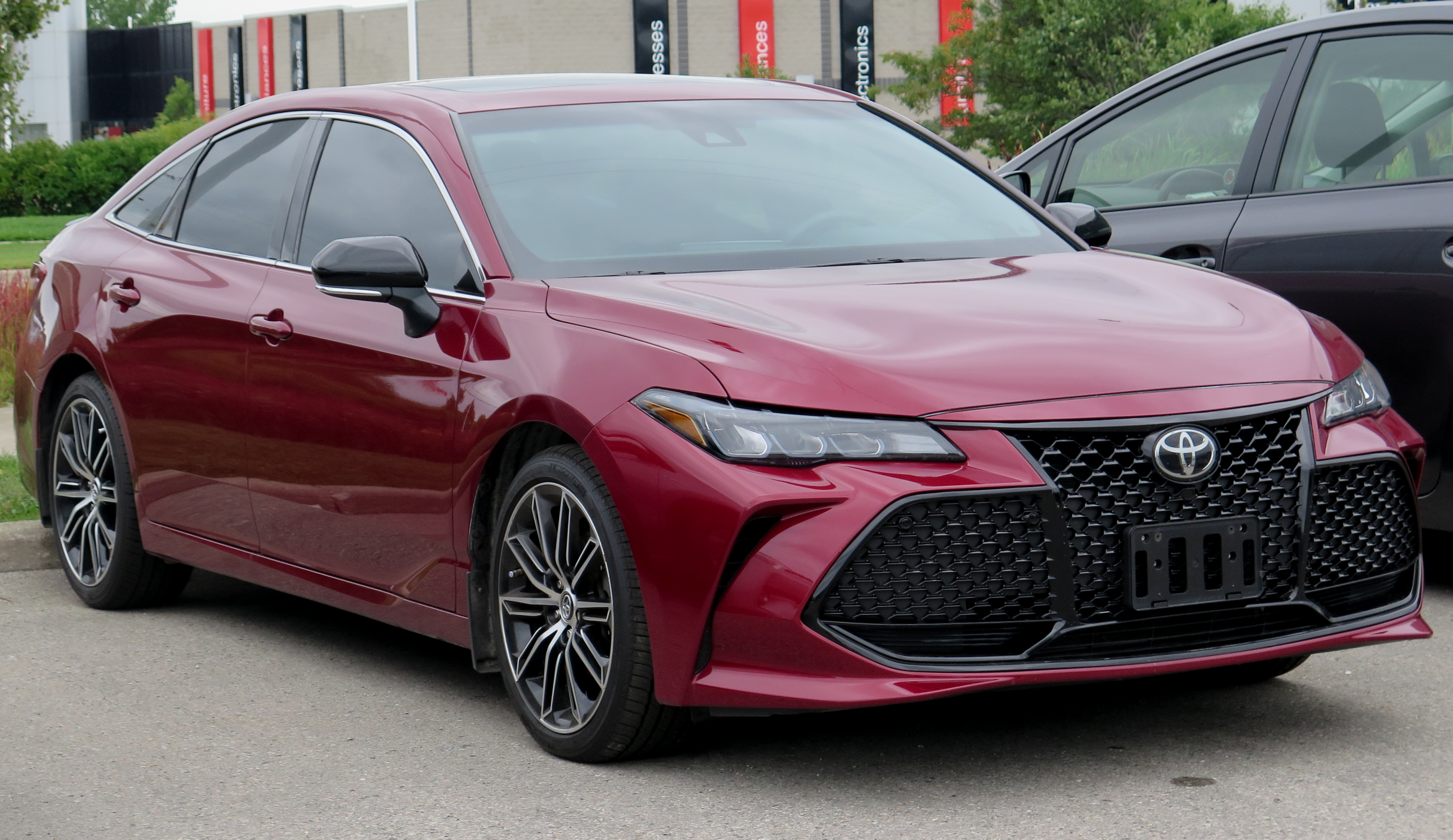
- Toyota Avalon XSE (GSX50, Canada)

Overview
- Manufacturer: Toyota
- Also called: Toyota Pronard (Japan, 2000–2004)
- Production: 1994–present
- Model years: 1995–2022 (US)

Body and chassis
- Class: Full-size car
- Body style: 4-door sedan
- Layout: Front-engine, front-wheel-drive (1994–present); Front-engine, four-wheel-drive (2020–2022)

Chronology
- Predecessor: Toyota Cressida (North America); Toyota Vienta (Australia); Toyota Crown (S210) (China)
- Successor: Toyota Aurion (Australia, for XX10 model); Toyota Crown (S235) (North America and Middle East)

The Toyota Avalon (Japanese: トヨタ・アバロン, Hepburn: Toyota Abaron) is a full-size sedan manufactured by Toyota, as its largest front-wheel drive sedan; also its flagship in the United States, Canada, China and the Middle East. The Avalon was also manufactured in Australia from April 2000 until June 2005, when it was replaced in November 2006 by the Aurion. The first production Avalon was manufactured in September 1994 at the TMMK assembly line in Georgetown, Kentucky, where subsequent generations have been manufactured.

Toyota marketed the front-drive Avalon as a replacement for its rear-drive Cressida, a model discontinued for the American market in 1992. The Cressida was an upper-level, mid-size, rear-wheel drive sedan. The Avalon has at times overlapped Toyota's models using the same platform, including the Camry V6 and the Lexus ES. The third-generation and subsequent generations was distinguished by offering extra legroom due to its extended-length chassis. From 2013, the Lexus ES was moved to the extended platform to match the Avalon.

As of 2013, the Avalon was sold in the United States, Canada, China, South Korea and the Middle East. It was discontinued in the United States in 2022.

Avalon is a legendary island of the Arthurian legend, fitting it in with Toyota's tradition of naming their sedans after variants of the word for "crown" in various languages (Crown, Corona, Camry, Corolla), types of crowns (Tiara), or other aspects of royalty (Scepter).

== First generation (XX10; 1994) ==
First generation
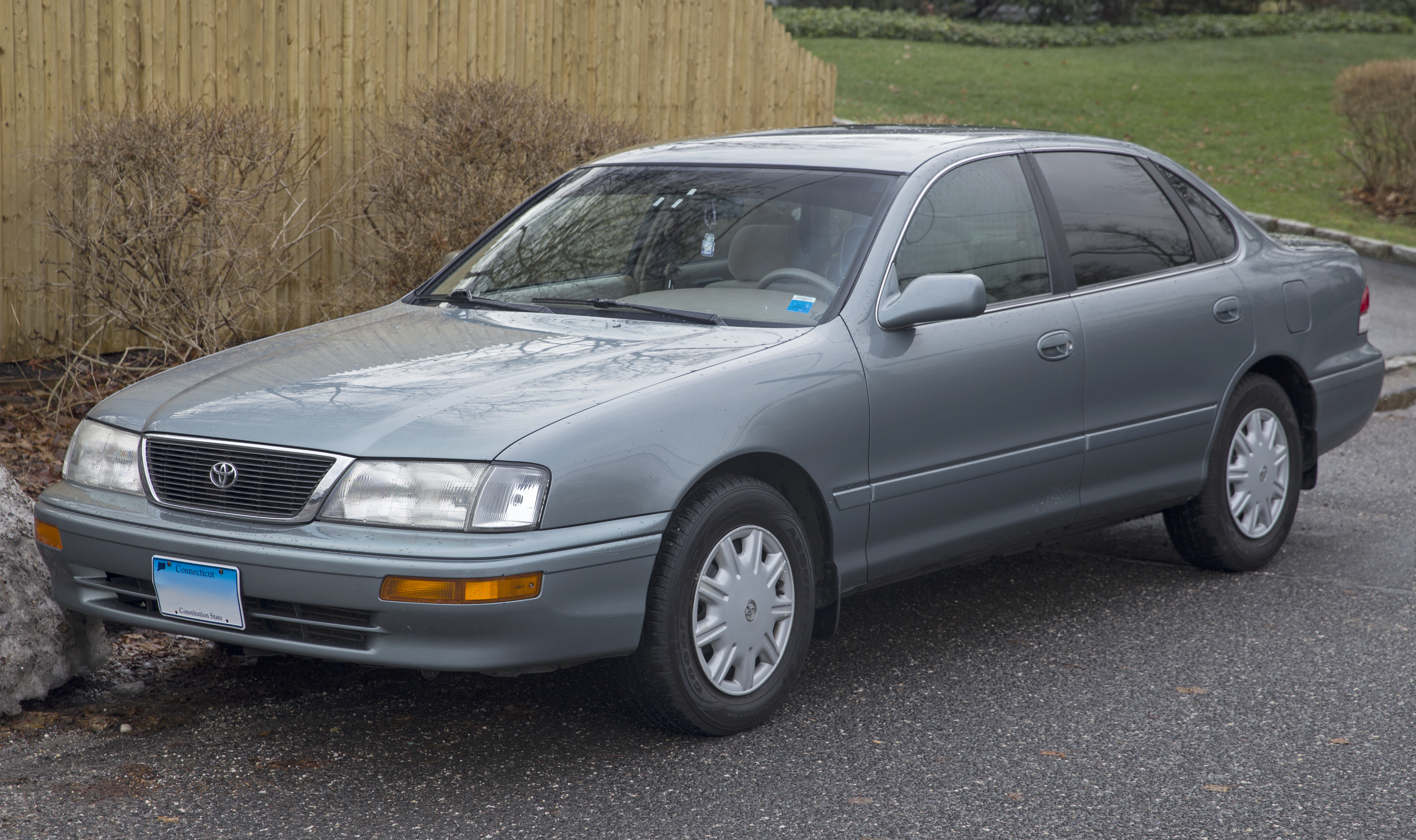
- 1996 Toyota Avalon XL (US)

Overview
- Model code: XX10
- Also called: Xinkai HXK6638 (China; rebadged import)
- Production: September 1994 – August 1999; April 2000 – June 2005 (Australia)
- Model years: 1995–1999
- Assembly: United States: Georgetown, Kentucky (TMMK); Australia: Altona (Toyota Australia)
- Designer: Kawazu Masahiko (Design Manager: 1991); Kusama Toshiharu (Design Chief: 1990-93); Hideaki Otsubo (facelift: 1995)

Body and chassis
- Layout: Front-engine, front-wheel-drive
- Platform: Toyota K platform (for Australian market)
- Related: Lexus ES/Toyota Windom (XV10); Lexus ES/Toyota Windom (XV20); Toyota Camry (XV10); Toyota Camry (XV20); Toyota Camry (XV30) (for Australian market); Toyota Sienna (XL10); Toyota X Runner (concept car)

Powertrain
- Engine: 3.0 L 1MZ-FE V6
- Transmission: 4-speed A541E automatic

Dimensions
- Wheelbase: 107.1 in (2,720 mm)
- Length: 1994–97: 190.2 in (4,831 mm); 1997–99: 191.9 in (4,874 mm)
- Width: 1994–97: 70.3 in (1,786 mm); 1997–99: 70.5 in (1,791 mm)
- Height: 1994–97: 55.9 in (1,420 mm); 1997–99: 56.7 in (1,440 mm)

Chronology
- Predecessor: Toyota Cressida (X80) (North America); Toyota Vienta (XV20) (Australia)
- Successor: Toyota Aurion (XV40) (Australia)

The Avalon was a new model introduced in February 1994 at the Chicago International Auto Show and launched in late 1994 for the 1995 model year. Development began in 1990 under the 299T project code (ending in 1993), with the design phase concluding in 1991 with internal approval of the final design. Design patents were filed with the Japanese Patent Office on 17 February 1992, under patent number 0890183. Built in the same plant as the Camry, the Avalon was based on a stretched XV10 Camry platform featuring a 3.0-liter 1MZ-FE V6 engine making 192 hp (140 kW) and 210 lb⋅ft (285 N⋅m) of torque. With almost 121 cu ft (3,426 L) of interior space, the Avalon was the roomiest six-passenger car from a Japanese manufacturer sold in America, despite being three inches shorter than the Mazda 929 and 11 inches shorter than the Dodge Intrepid. Its exterior dimensions were almost exactly the same as its perennial competitors, the Nissan Maxima, Mitsubishi Diamante and Mazda Millenia.

Toyota first introduced the "Avalon" name on a concept convertible sedan at the 1991 Tokyo Motor Show.

The Avalon was available with a front bench seat for six-passenger seating, and its column shifter was the first such feature in an American Toyota car since the T130 series Corona. The XL models were similar to the LE models of other Toyota vehicles, and the XLS models were similar to the XLE models of other Toyota vehicles. Traction control was optional. For 1997 models ABS became standard, power rating increased to 200 hp (150 kW), and torque increased to 214 lb⋅ft (290 N⋅m). In 1997 for the 1998 model year a mid-cycle refresh was introduced with minor updates to the front and rear fascias. Also for 1998, the Avalon's structure was modified to improve safety while front seat-mounted side airbags became standard.

The first-generation Avalon was also sold in Japan (vehicles were made in the United States and exported to Japan) as a right-hand drive model, and was exclusive to Toyopet Store locations. In Japan, it was the largest front-wheel drive sedan at Toyopet Store locations, and was sold alongside the front-engine, rear-drive Toyota Celsior, and was available in 3.0 and 3.0 G grade levels, with the "Coach Edition" available as an option starting in late 1997 (equivalent to the 1998 model year). In Japan it was classified as a luxury car (and so carried an expensive, yearly road tax) because of Japanese government dimension regulations that placed it in the "large car" category and its, by Japanese standards, large engine displacement.

US market
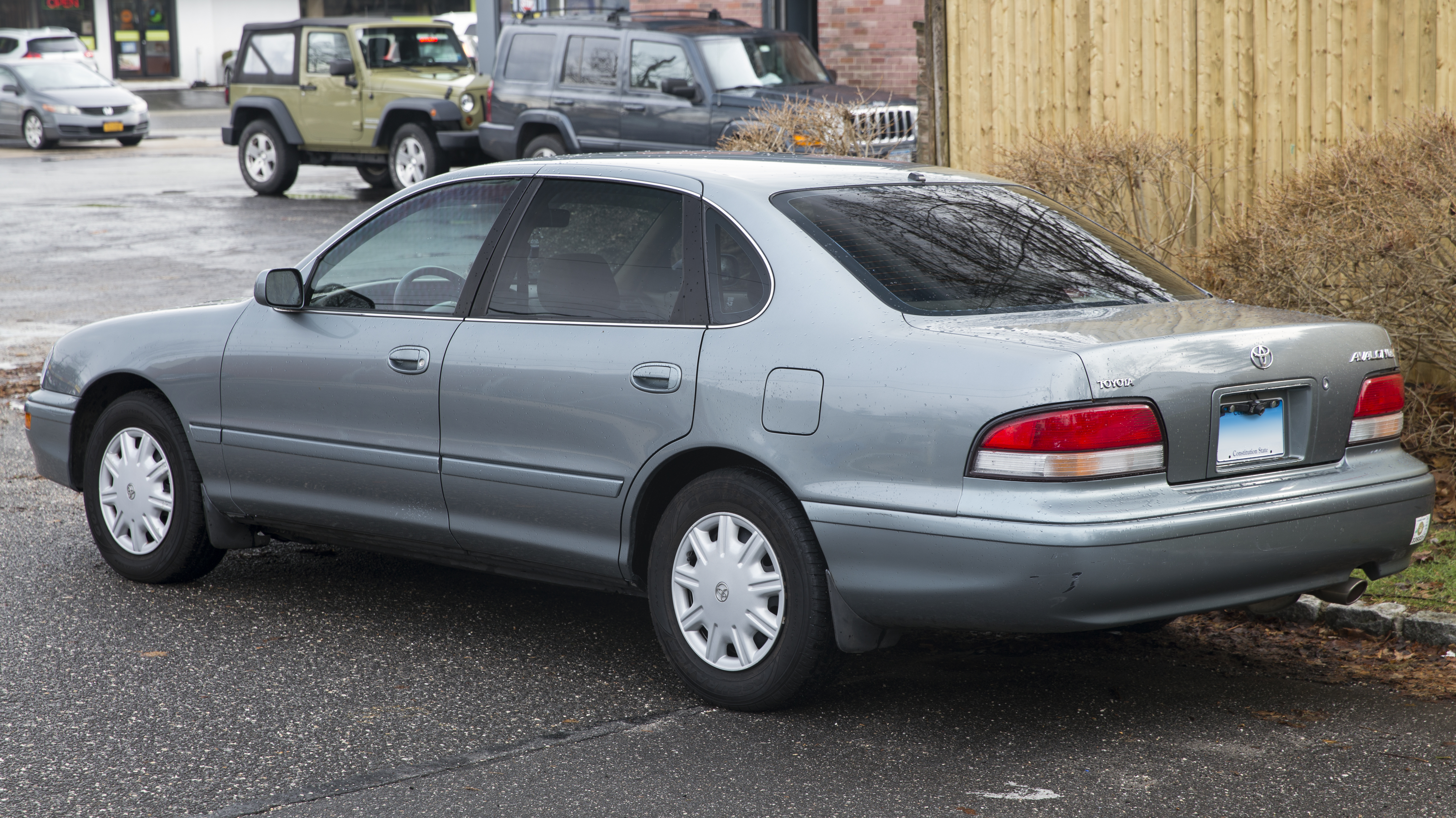
Avalon XL (1996 MY)

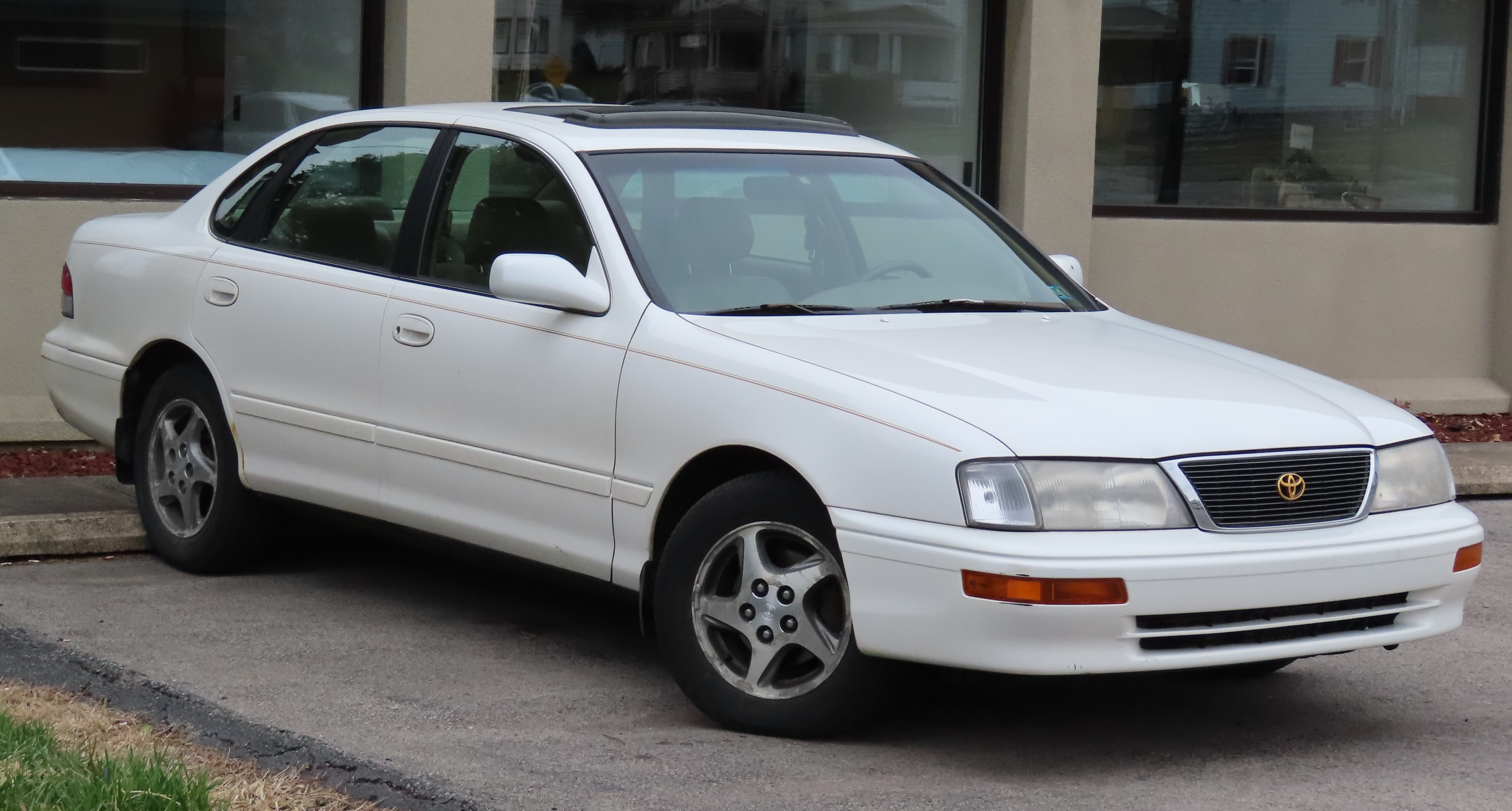
Avalon XLS (1997 MY)

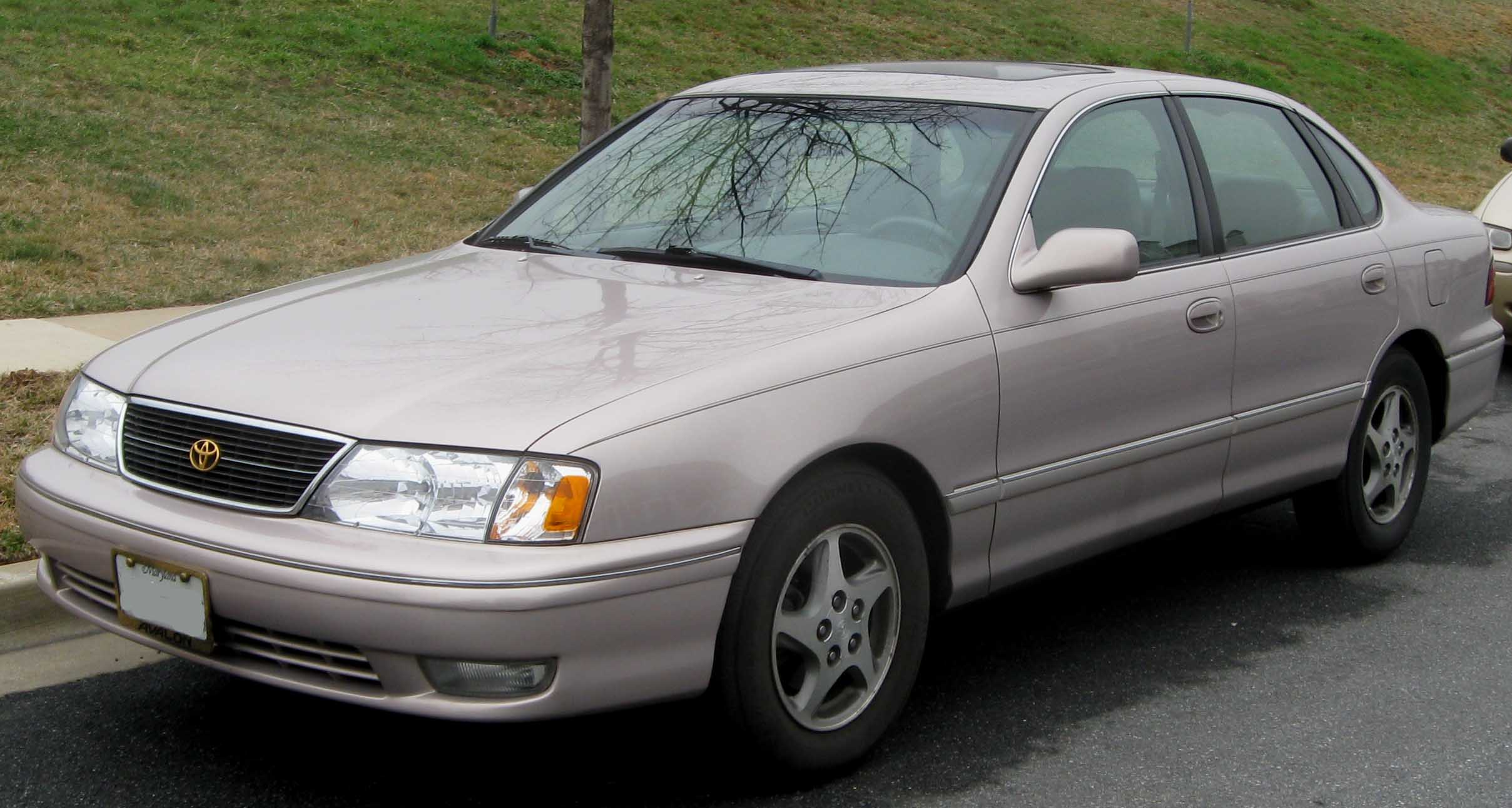
Avalon XLS (1998–1999 MY)

=== Australia (2000–2005) ===
In 1999, Toyota recycled the old tooling for the old Avalon by shipping it to Toyota Australia, and launched it as an "all-new" model in June 2000. The new Australian Avalon had an identical body to the original model. The Australian model was built at the Toyota Australia Altona Plant in Melbourne, made in both right-hand drive (for Australia, New Zealand, and some parts of Asia), as well as left-hand drive for the Middle East. The Camry was also made at this plant. The Avalon performed poorly in Australia; critics called the car "boring", and sales were low. The Avalon was front-wheel drive and available only as a sedan with a 3.0-liter V6 and automatic transmission. By contrast, its intended rivals, the Ford Falcon and Holden Commodore, were rear-wheel drive and offered a wider range of body styles and engine/transmission options.

Toyota had originally decided to rename the Avalon as the Centaur for the Australian market, after the mythological creature of the same name. However, the Australian hospital ship AHS Centaur had been torpedoed and sunk by a Japanese submarine during World War II and when Toyota Australia was made aware of this prior to the release of the car, they organised for the Centaur badges to be destroyed and removed the offending nameplate from all paperwork and advertising. As a result, the original "Avalon" name prevailed for the Australian market.

When the Avalon was updated in 2001 as the "Mark II" (not to be confused with the separate Toyota Mark II), the model range was lightly revised and new hubcaps/alloy wheels were fitted. The "Mark III" designation refers to the 2003 to 2005 facelift models.

Many buyers preferred the V6-powered Camry instead of the Avalon. Furthermore, the 2003 facelift failed to rectify the lower than expected sales, with many criticizing the new front styling. Because of these sales concerns, Toyota Australia marketed it towards taxi fleets, against the Ford Falcon, with a specially developed dual-fuel (LPG and gasoline)-compatible engine. Avalon production ceased in mid-2005. In November 2006, Toyota introduced its replacement, the Toyota Aurion (XV40).

Australian market Mark I
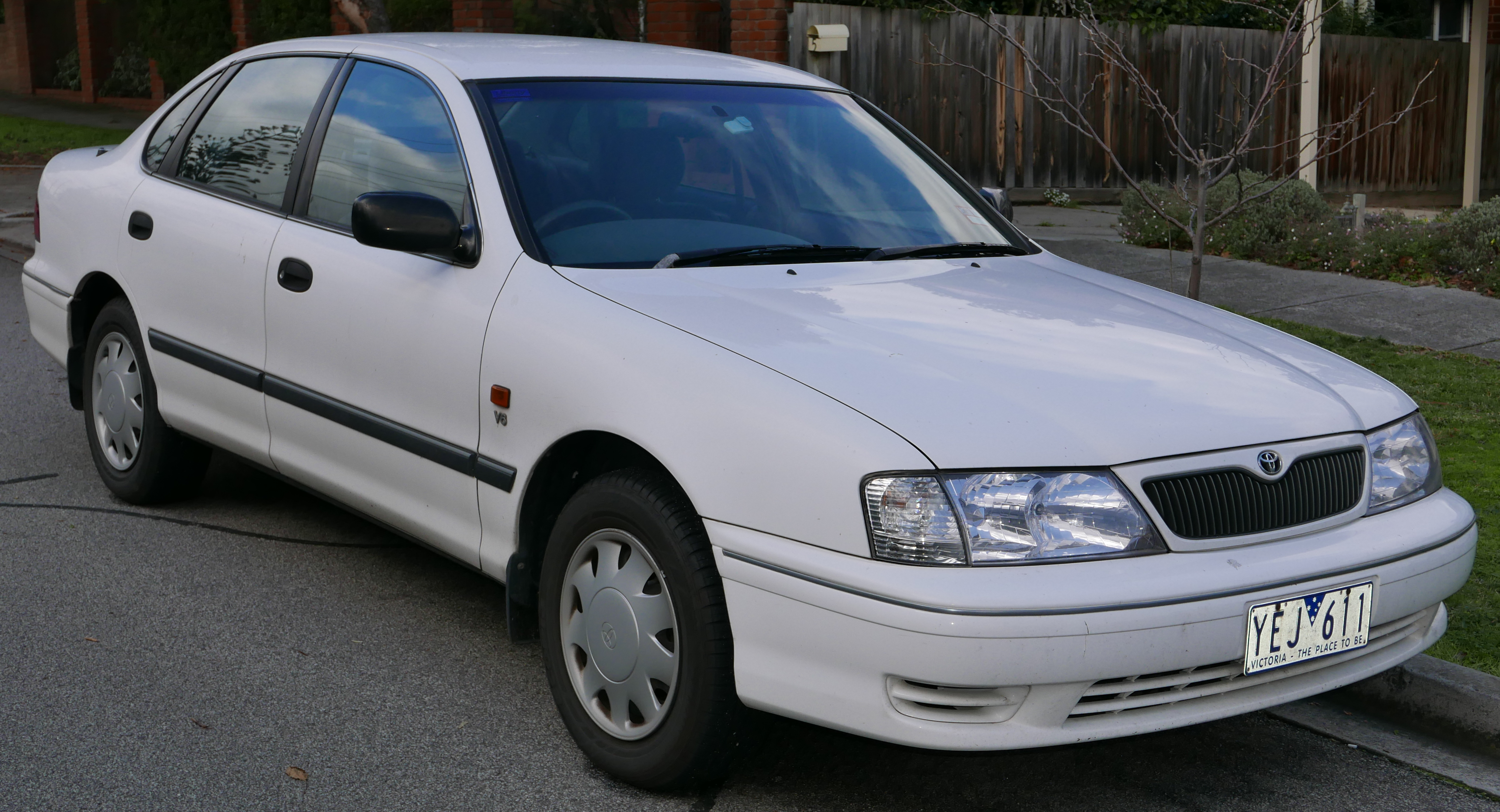
Avalon Conquest

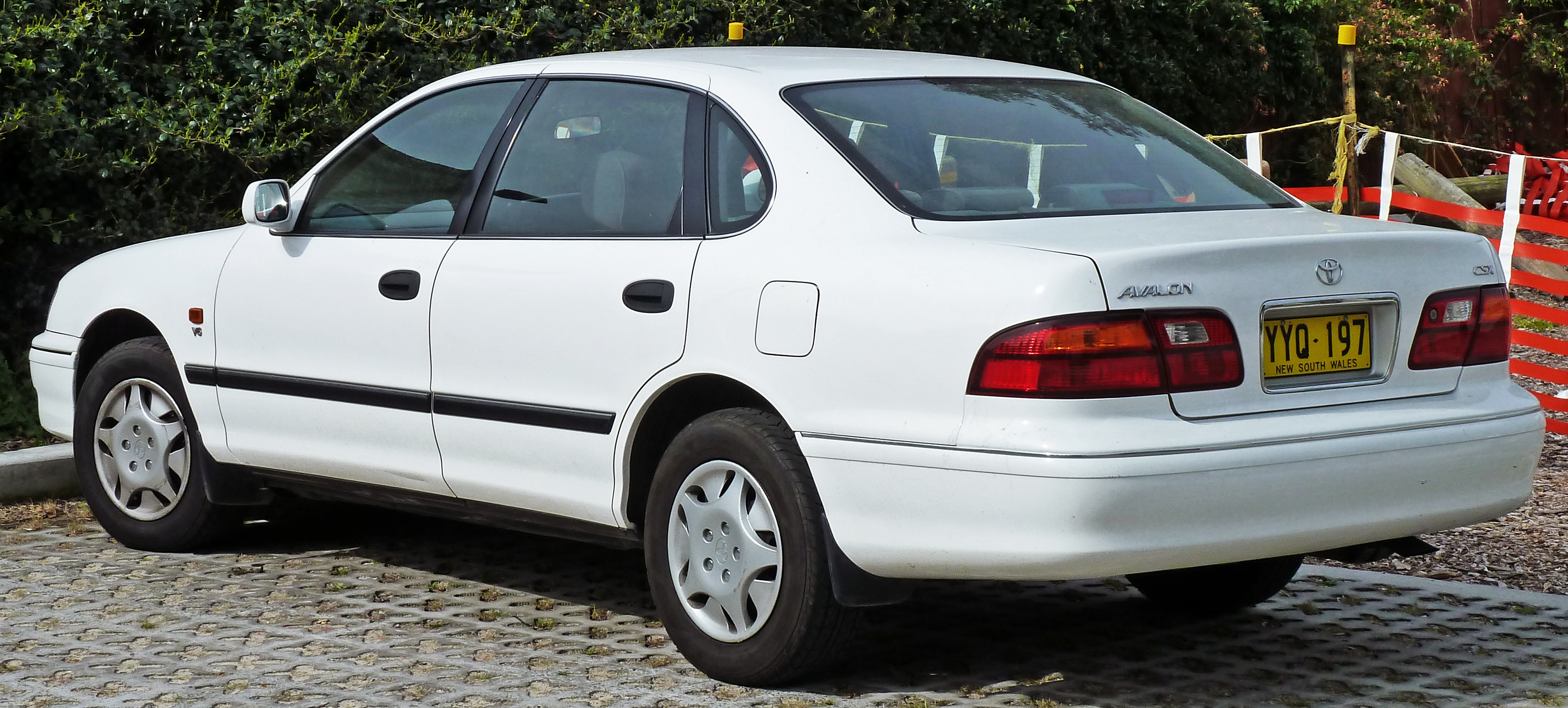
Avalon CSX
Australian market Mark II
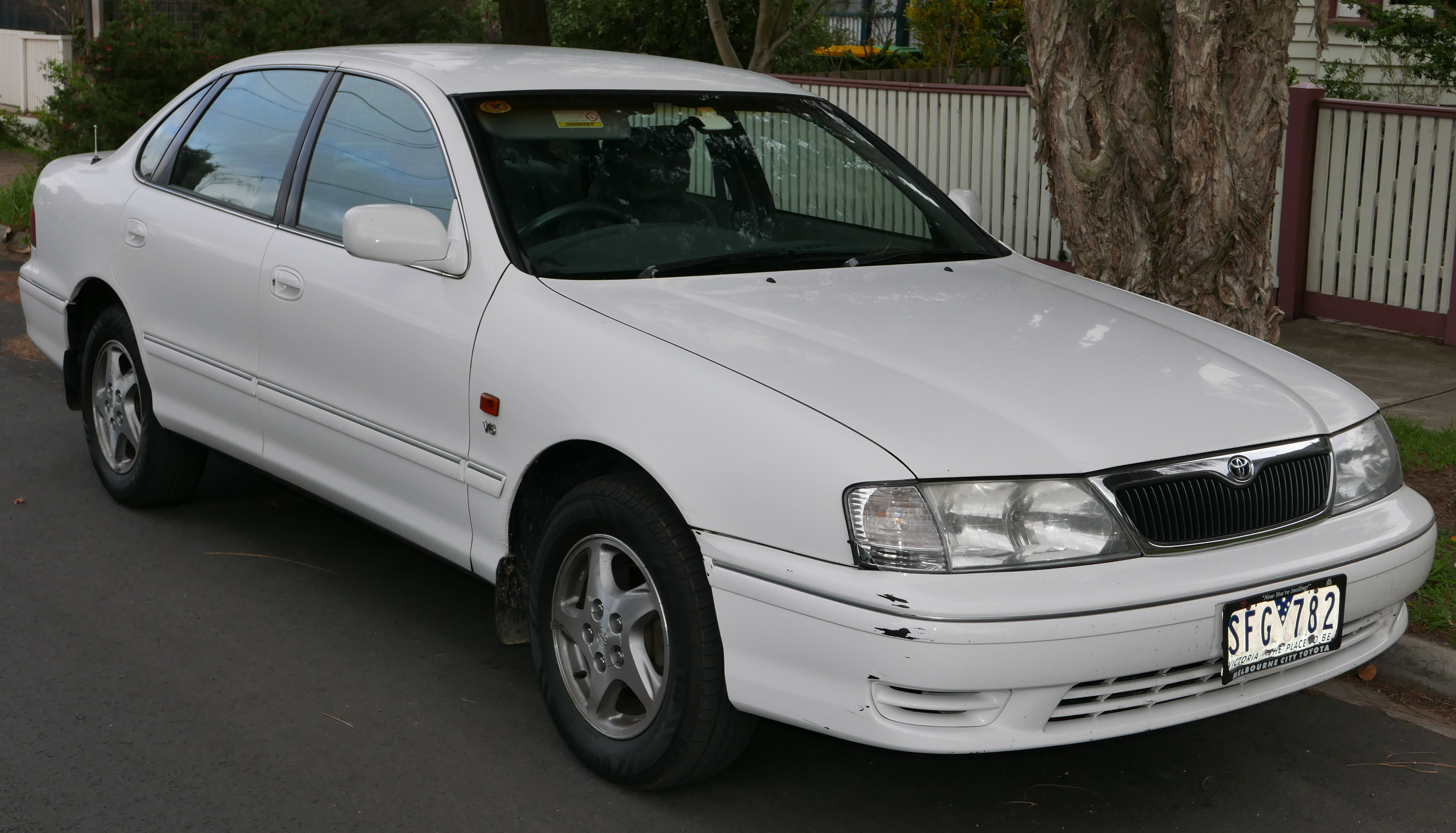
Avalon Advantage

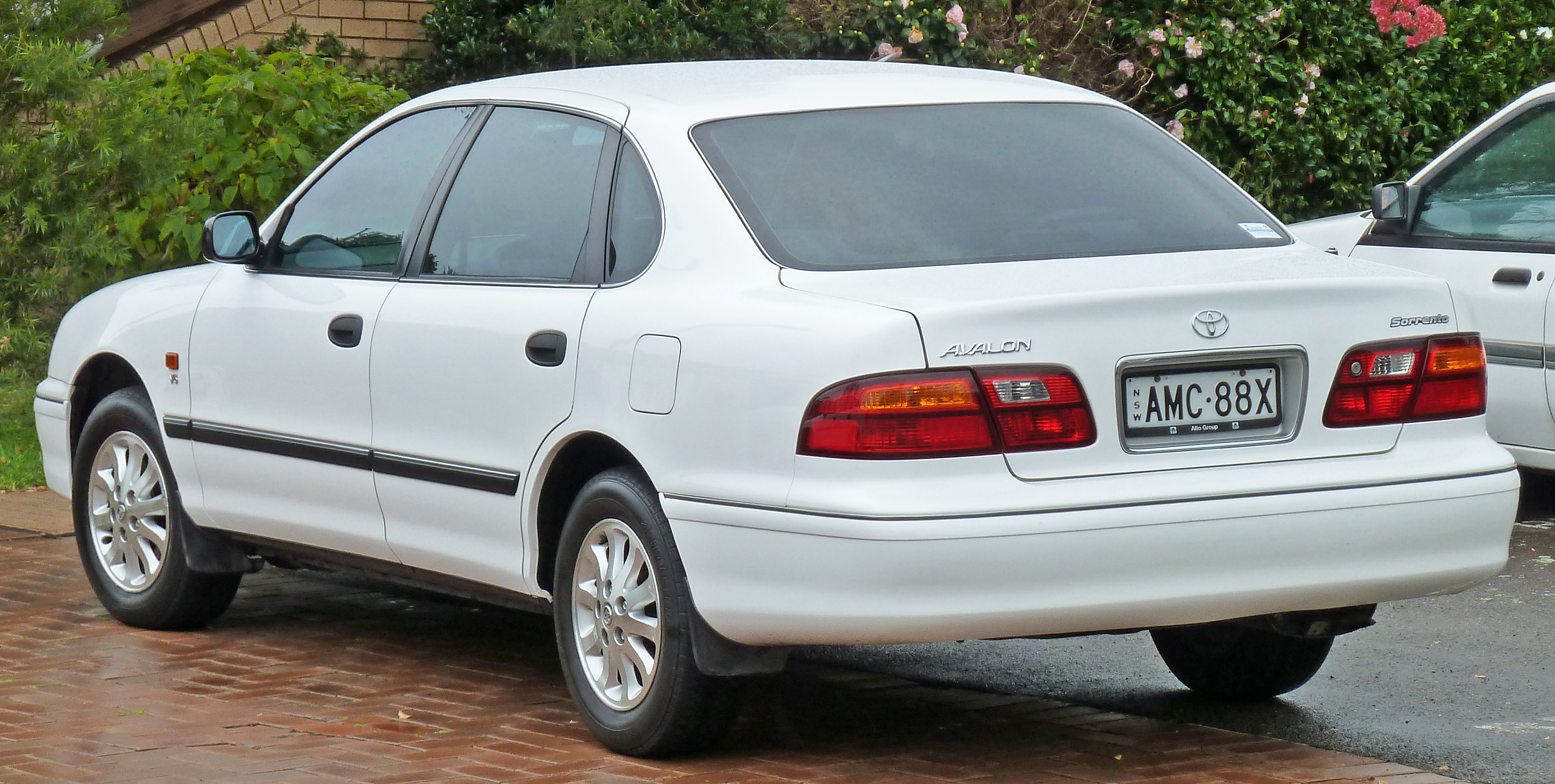
Avalon Sorrento
Australian market Mark III
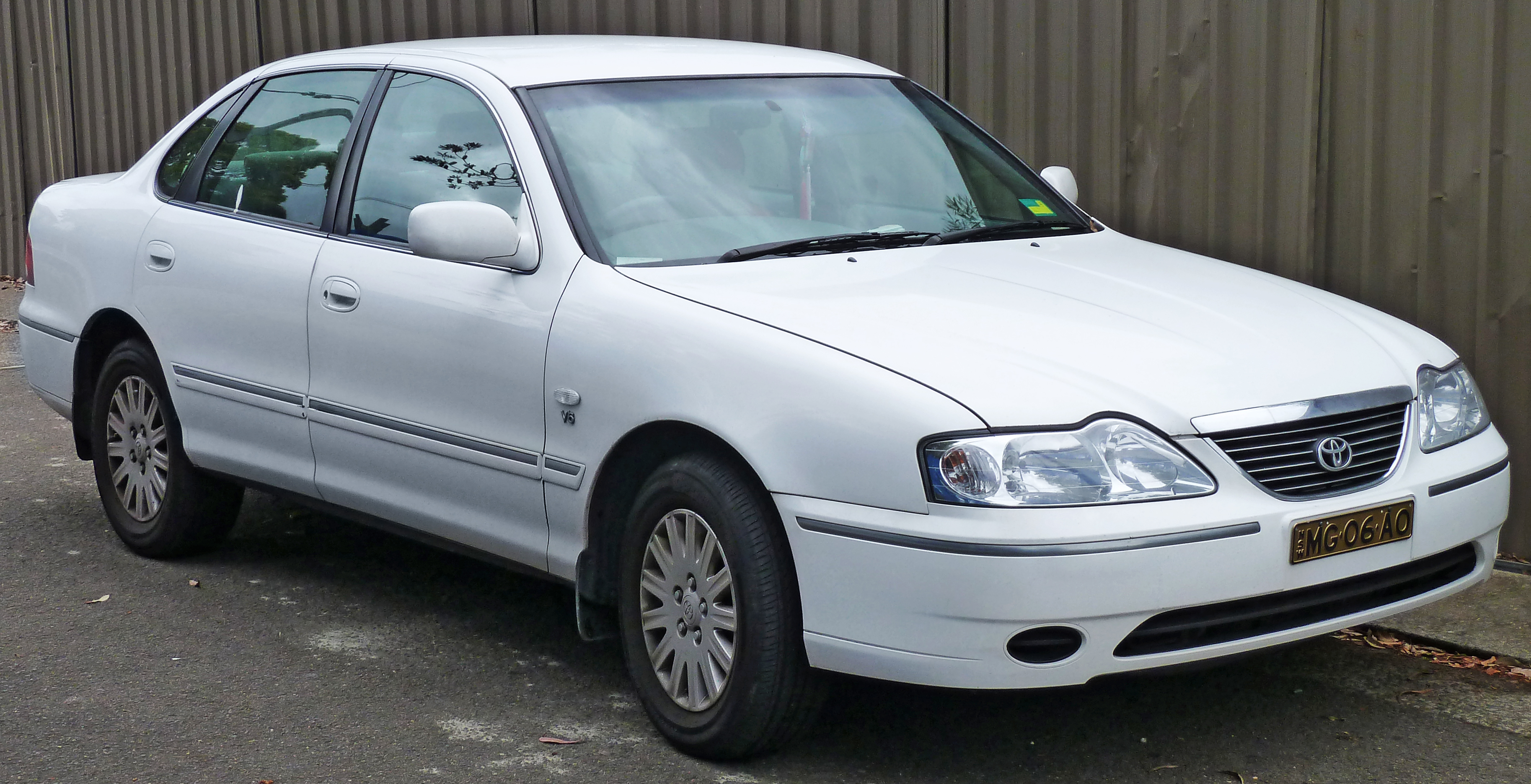
Avalon GXi

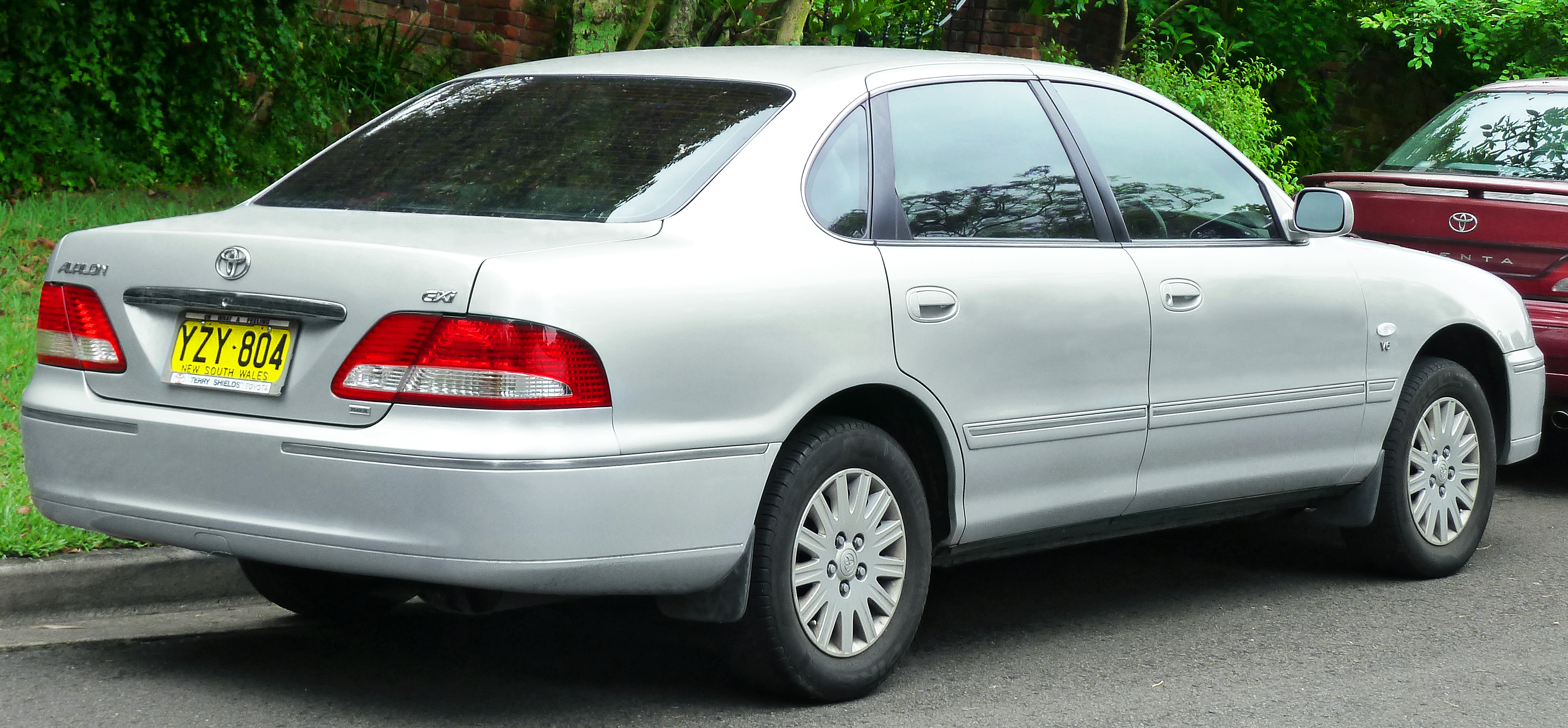
Avalon GXi

==== Toyota X-Runner Concept ====
At the 2003 Melbourne and Sydney International Motor Shows, Toyota Australia unveiled the X-Runner Concept, a coupe utility version of the Avalon. The suspension AWD parts were borrowed from the Lexus RX and the rear axle came from the Tarago van. It was intended for production, but Toyota of Australia could not get approval from the parent company.

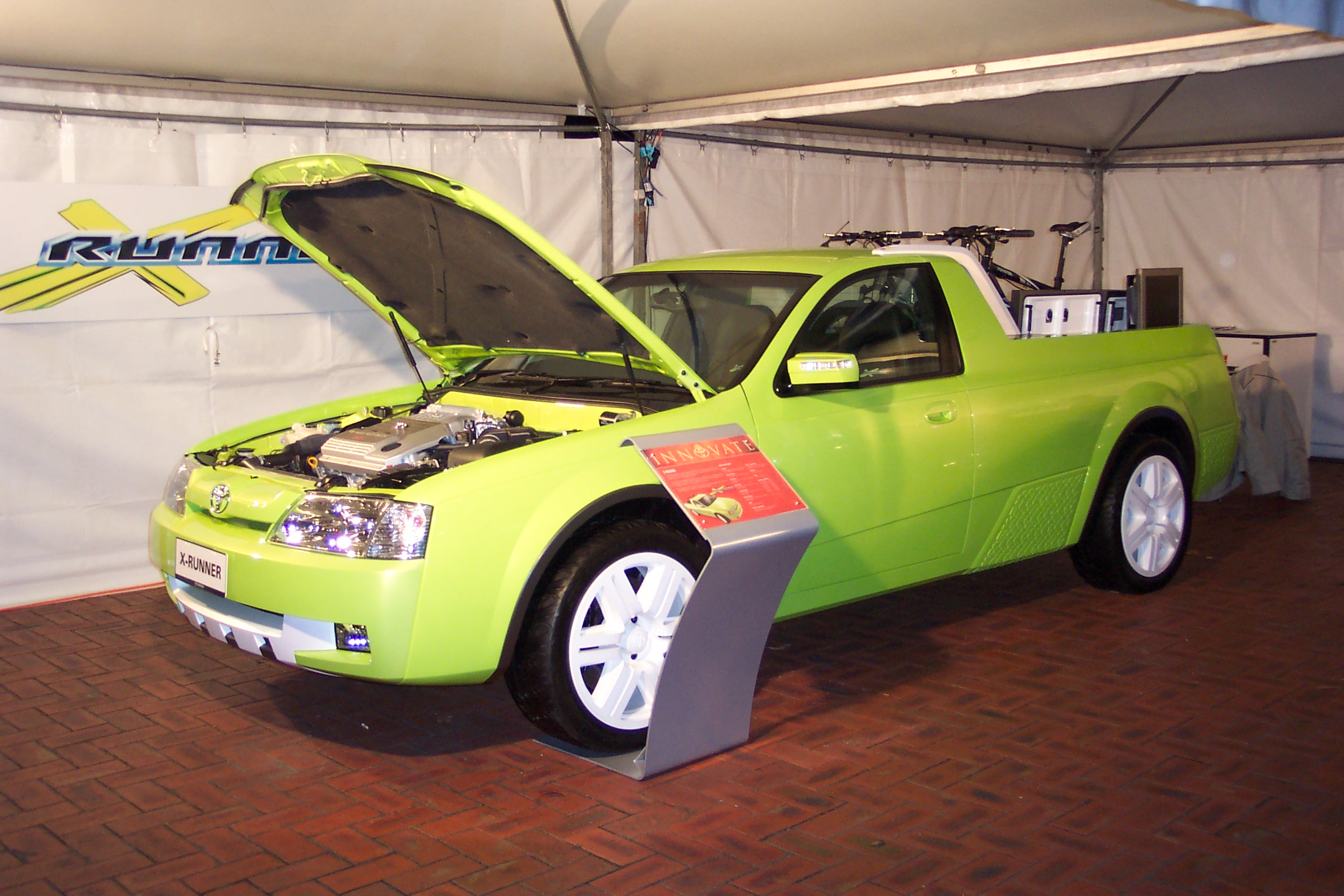
Toyota X-Runner concept as displayed at the 2003 Sydney International Motor Show

=== Safety ===
ANCAP test results* Toyota Avalon conquest sedan with dual frontal airbags (2001)
Test	Score
Overall	3 /5 stars
Frontal offset	6.45/16
Side impact	11.31/16
Pole	Not Assessed
Seat belt reminders	0/3
Whiplash protection	Not Assessed
Pedestrian protection	Not Assessed
Electronic stability control	Not Assessed

== Second generation (XX20; 1999) ==
Second generation
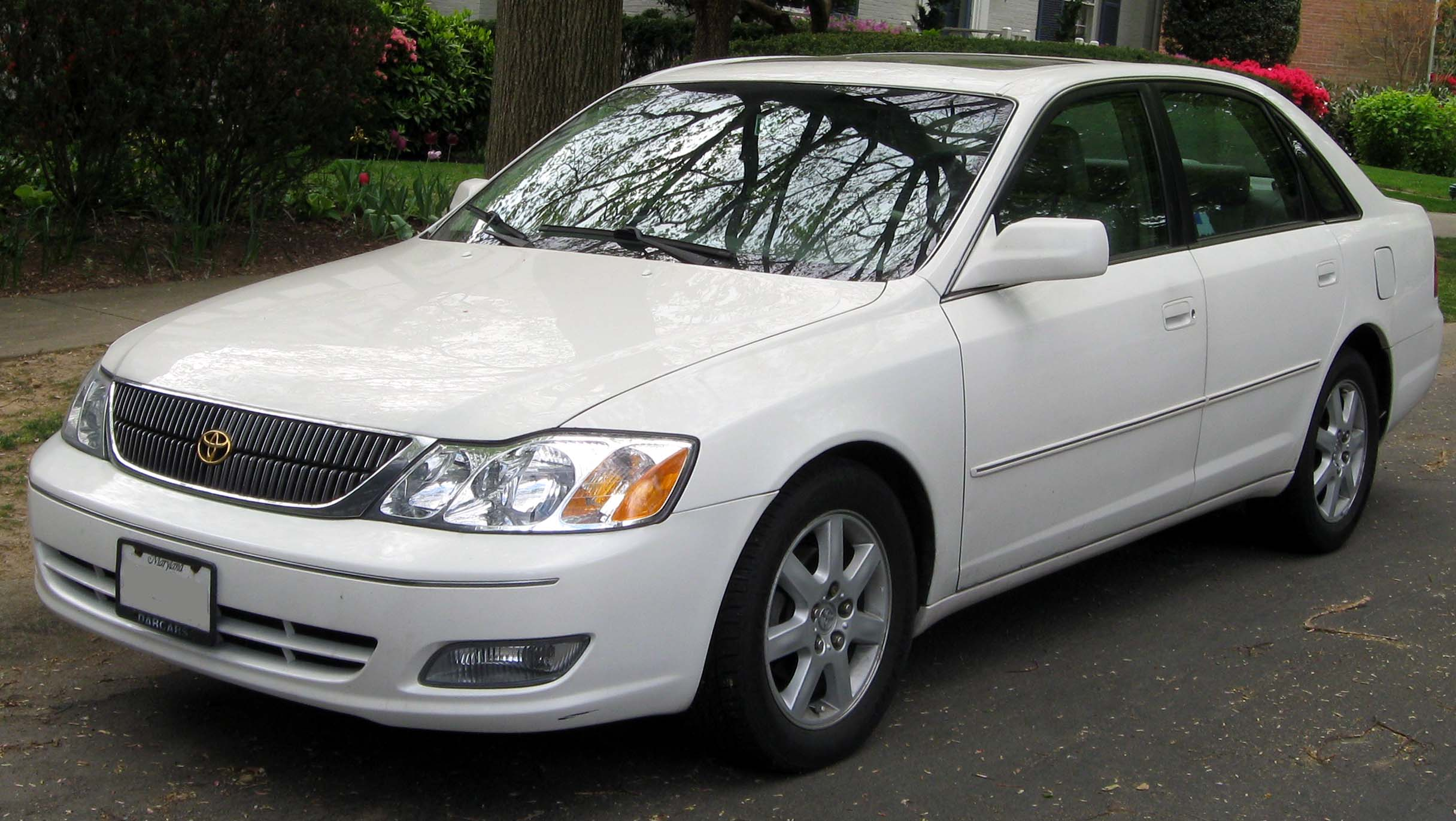
- 2000–2002 Toyota Avalon XLS (US)

Overview
- Model code: XX20
- Also called: Toyota Pronard (Japan)
- Production: September 1999 – November 2004
- Model years: 2000–2004
- Assembly: United States: Georgetown, Kentucky (TMMK)
- Designer: Kevin Hunter and Yo Hiruta (1997)

Body and chassis
- Layout: Front-engine, front-wheel-drive
- Platform: Toyota K platform
- Related: Lexus ES/Toyota Windom (XV30); Toyota Camry (XV30)

Powertrain
- Engine: 3.0 L 1MZ-FE V6
- Transmission: 4-speed A541E automatic

Dimensions
- Wheelbase: 107.1 in (2,720 mm)
- Length: 191.9 in (4,874 mm)
- Width: 71.7 in (1,821 mm)
- Height: 1999–2002: 57.7 in (1,466 mm); 2002–2004: 57.1 in (1,450 mm)

The second-generation Avalon grew larger in almost every respect, except wheelbase. It was still based on the stretched Camry platform and was powered by a 3.0-liter 1MZ-FE V6 engine equipped with VVT-i, shared with the Toyota Camry, Toyota Highlander, Toyota Sienna, and the Lexus ES300, making 210 hp (157 kW) and 220 lb⋅ft (298 N⋅m). of torque and paired to a 4-speed automatic. The coefficient of drag had been reduced to Cd=0.28.

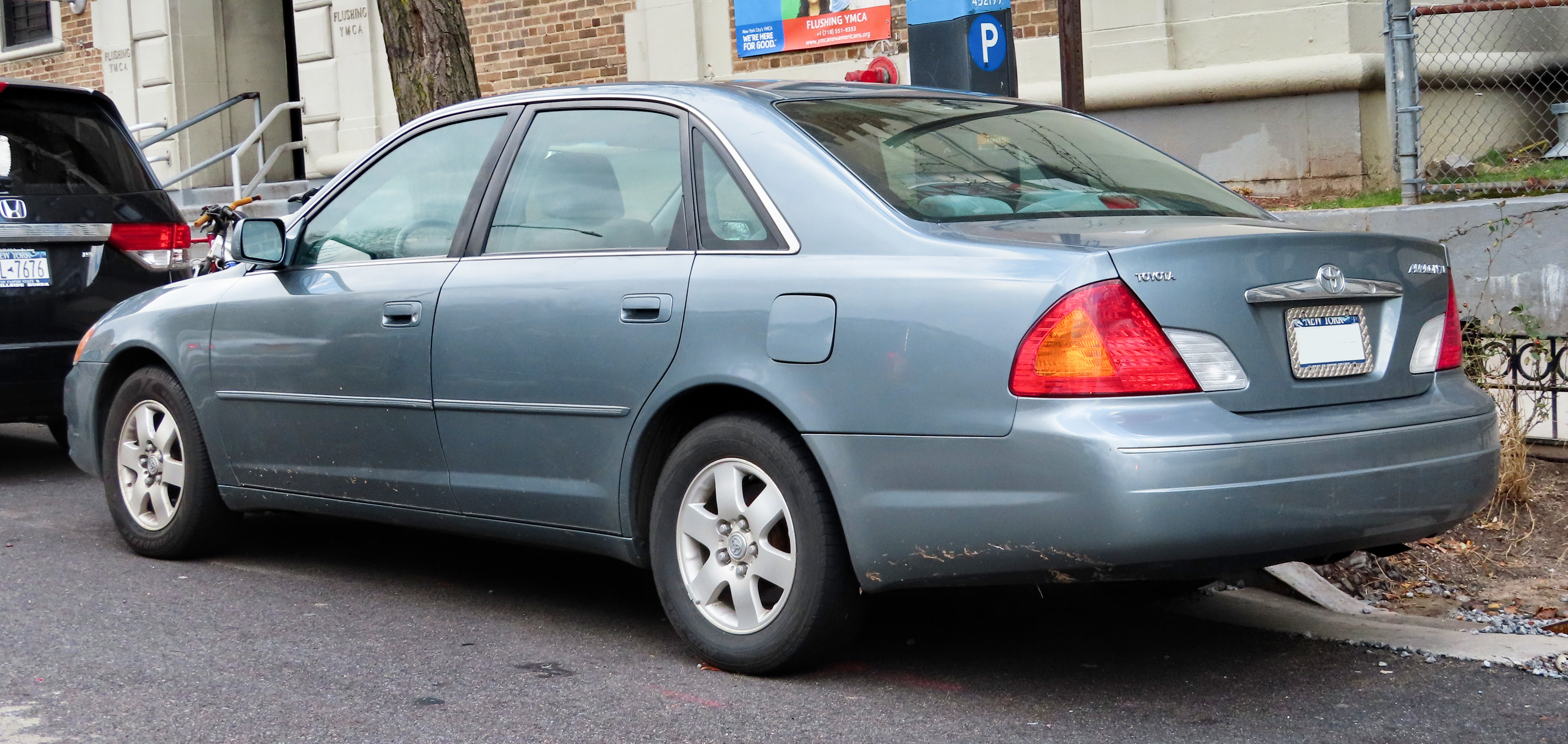
2000–2002 Toyota Avalon XL (US)

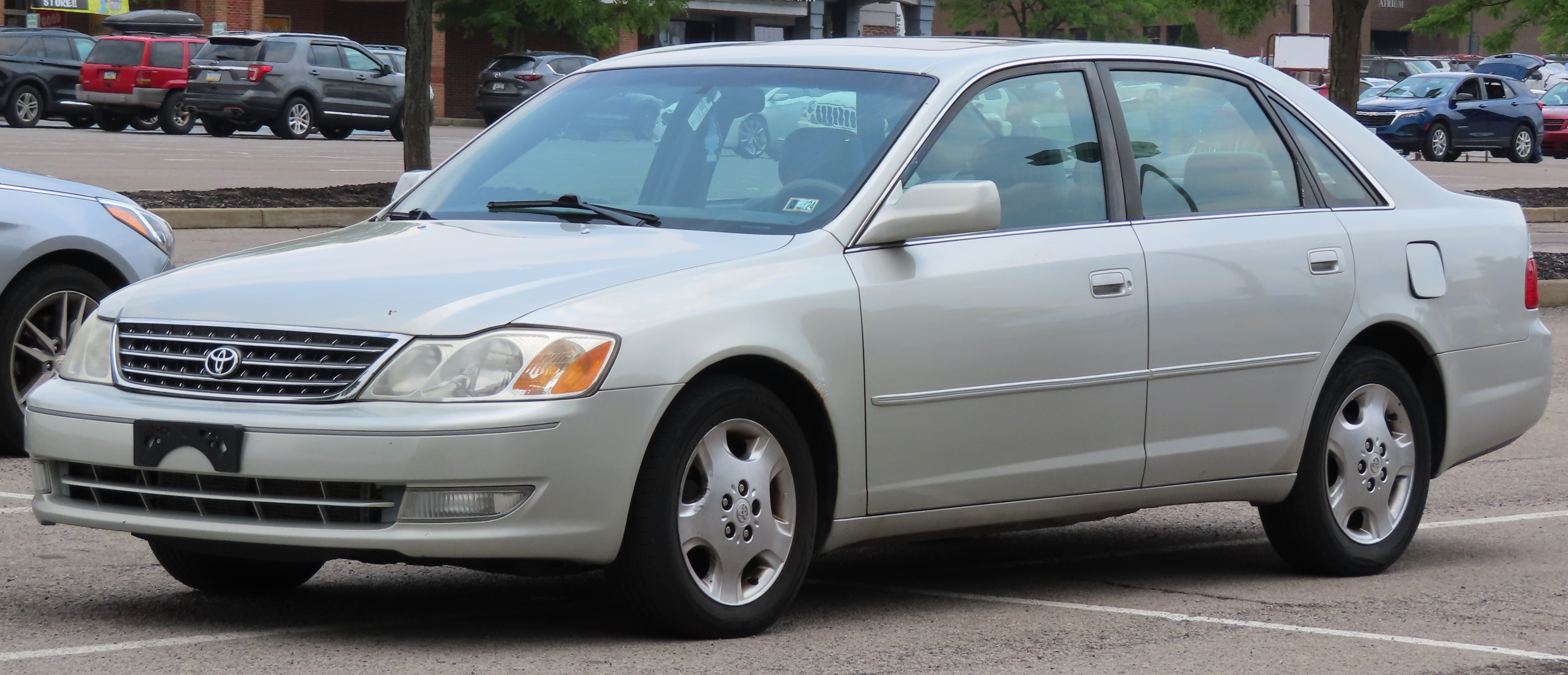

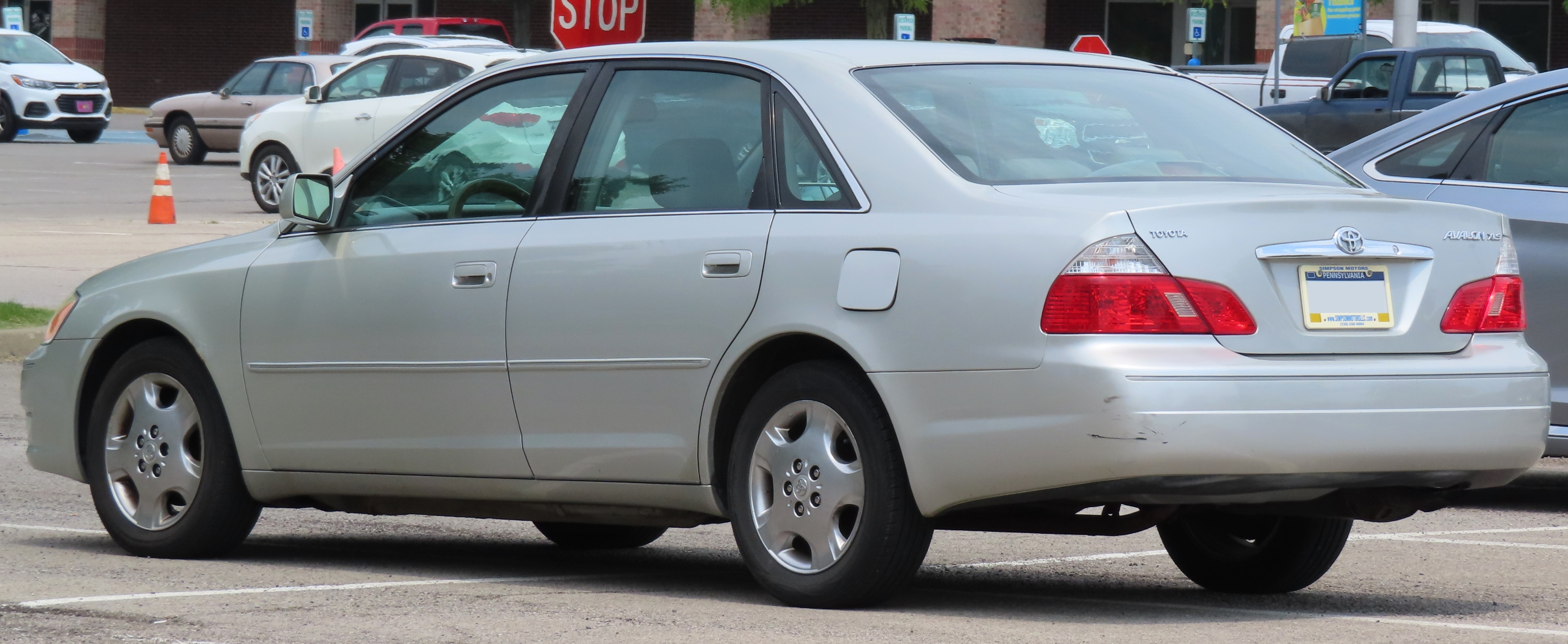
2003–2004 Toyota Avalon XLS (US)

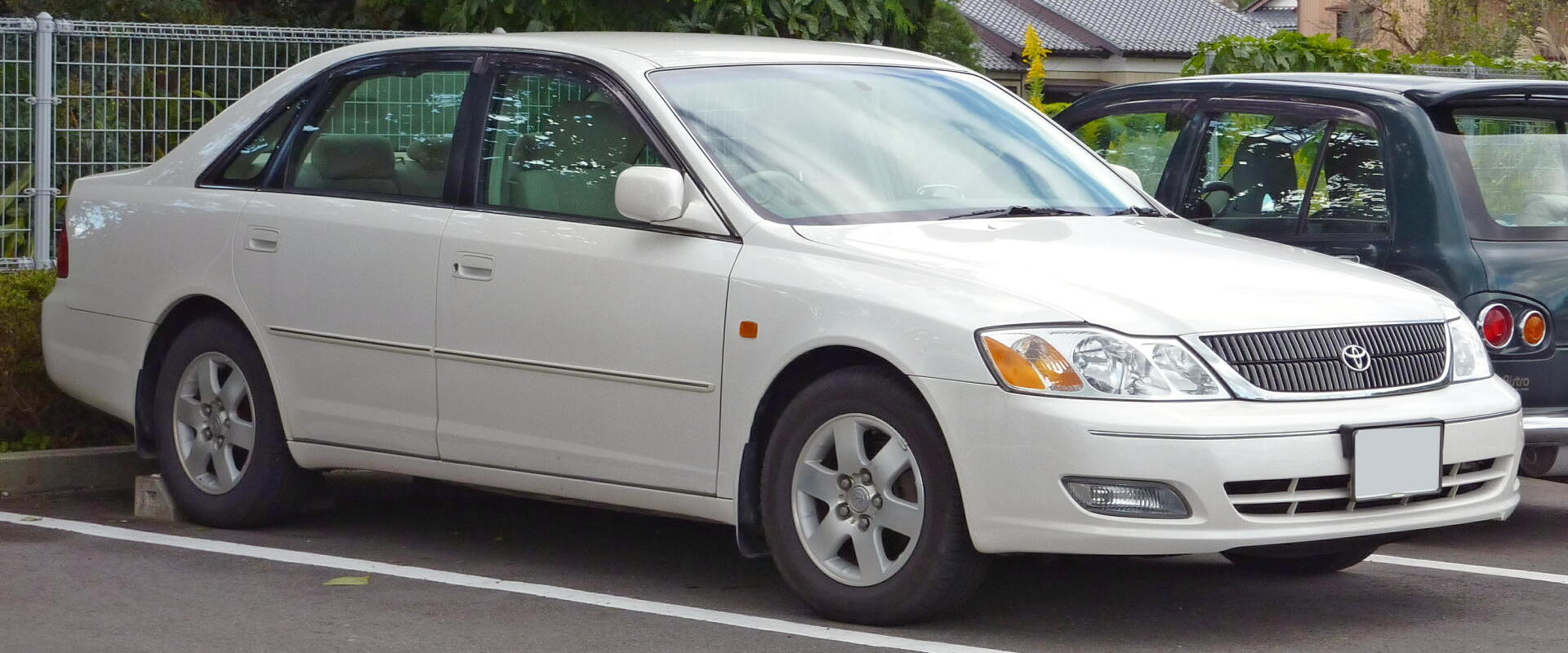
2000–2002 Toyota Pronard (Japan)

This Avalon was available in two trims: the basic XL and the upscale XLS. Standard features include electroluminescent Optitron gauges, 4-wheel disc ABS, front torso side airbags and 15" alloy wheels. Optional were a JBL audio system, Vehicle Stability Control, and a front row bench seat, allowing up to six passengers—a characteristic of large sized cars. However, the front center seat is a tight fit for an adult passenger. Dual climate control, larger 16" wheels, and driver's and passenger's power seats were also available.

This second-generation Avalon also featured a built-in 115 V AC power inverter, the first car with such a feature. This was dropped in the third-generation Avalon; yet, the Toyota Highlander, Matrix, Sienna, and Scion models now offer such an inverter.

The Avalon received a mid-cycle facelift for the 2003 model year, with a new grille and modified headlights and tail lights. The minor interior changes included an optional navigation system, woodgrain-style trimmed steering wheel for the XLS, slightly modified gauges, and a chrome emblem steering wheel added onto the XL (once only standard for the XLS).

The second-generation Avalon was also exported to the Japanese market as the Toyota Pronard (Japanese: トヨタ・プロナード, Hepburn: Toyota Puronādo), derived from the French word "prôner" for "extol", "commend", or "praise", between 2000 and 2004, replacing the first-generation sold as the Avalon. The Japanese Toyota Pronard was reassigned from Toyopet Store and was now exclusive to the former Vista Store network as Toyota Netz locations, slotted between the larger Toyota Aristo and smaller Verossa and Altezza. Some of the optional equipment installed in the Pronard, to enhance its luxury, was the TEMS ride control technology. Due to poor sales, Toyota did not export the third-generation Avalon to Japan; thus, the Toyota Pronard has been discontinued.

In the Insurance Institute for Highway Safety (IIHS) frontal crash test the Avalon received a "Good" overall score with the "Good" in all six measured categories.

Unlike the first-generation model, there was no Australian production or sales of this or later models.

== Third generation (XX30; 2004) ==
Third generation
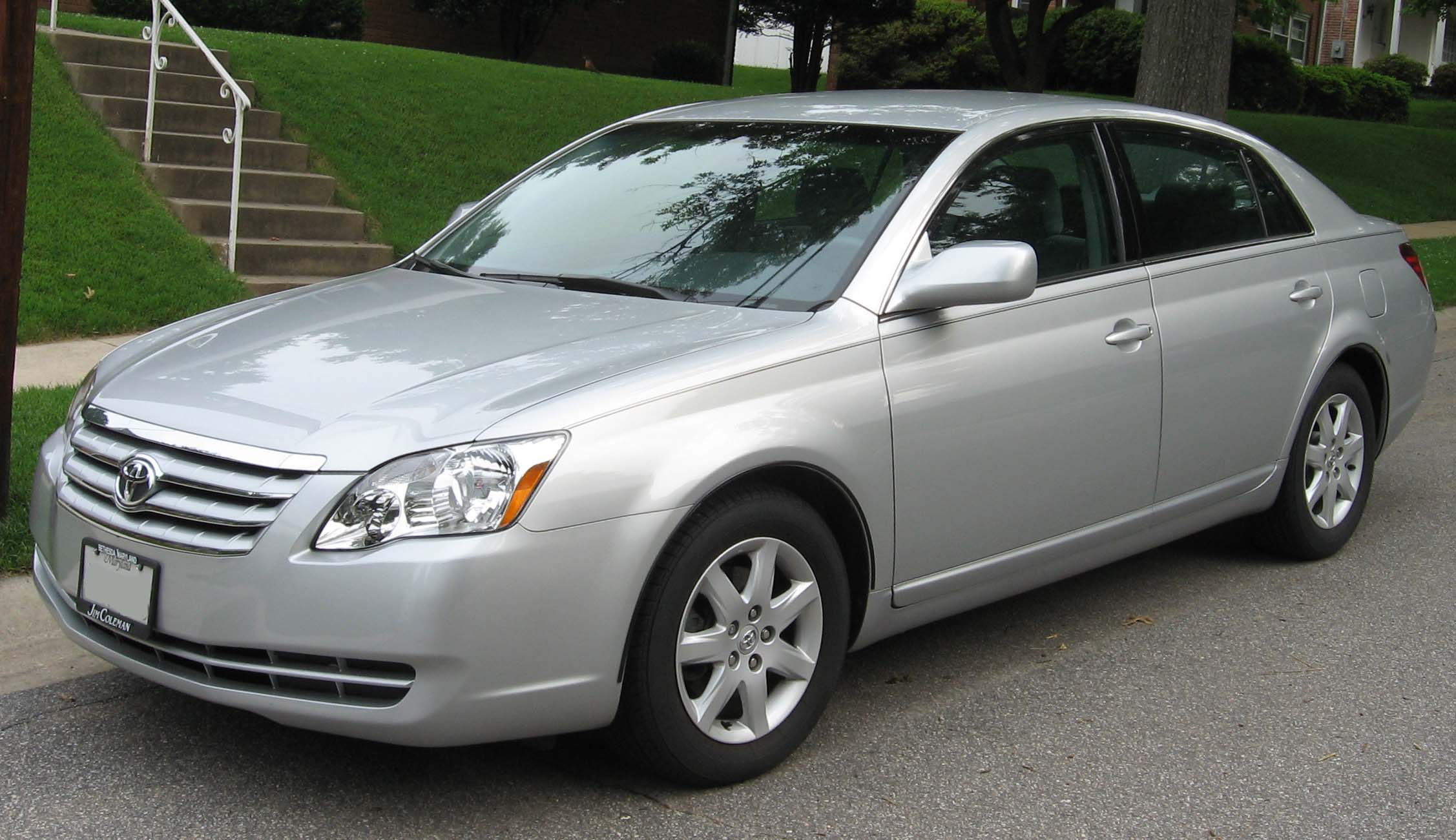
- 2005–2007 Toyota Avalon XL (US)

Overview
- Model code: XX30
- Production: December 2004 – October 2012
- Model years: 2005–2012
- Assembly: United States: Georgetown, Kentucky (TMMK)
- Designer: Masanari Sakae, Yoshikazu Harada, Kenta Shimoguchi and Ian Cartabiano (2003)

Body and chassis
- Layout: Front-engine, front-wheel-drive
- Platform: Toyota K platform
- Related: Toyota Camry/Aurion (XV40)

Powertrain
- Engine: 3.5 L 2GR-FE V6
- Transmission: 5-speed U151E automatic; 6-speed U660E automatic

Dimensions
- Wheelbase: 111.0 in (2,820 mm)
- Length: 2004–2010: 197.2 in (5,009 mm); 2010–2012: 197.6 in (5,020 mm)
- Width: 72.8 in (1,850 mm)
- Height: 58.5 in (1,485 mm)
- Curb weight: 3,560–3,660 lb (1,615–1,660 kg)

The Avalon underwent a redesign for 2005, and was unveiled to the public at the January 2005 North American International Auto Show. It went on sale in February 2005. Toyota reportedly cut the Avalon's production development time down from 29.5 months to 18 months. The third generation Avalon was not sold in Europe or Japan.

The third generation Avalon was larger than previous versions, with Calty styling and drag coefficient of Cd=0.29; the Avalon also became the first Toyota to use a single piece wiper blade design. The redesign dropped the front bench seat option, a feature once common among large American sedans such as Buicks and Cadillacs, and featured a semi-flat rear floor to help increase rear passenger comfort.

The Avalon was the first Toyota to use Dual VVT-i in the US market in an all-new 3.5-liter 2GR-FE V6 engine which met ULEV certification and had a power output of 280 hp (209 kW) with a 0–60 time of 6.0 seconds. The engine was mated to a 5-speed sequential shift automatic. Due to changes in the SAE's testing procedures, power dropped to 268 hp (200 kW) and torque dropped to 248 lb⋅ft (336 N⋅m) for the 2006 model year. Actual power output did not change.

The Avalon came in four trims: the standard (base) XL, Touring, XLS, and Limited. The XL model included 16" alloy wheels, while other trims came with larger 17" wheels. Performance-oriented tires were fitted to the Touring and Limited trims.

The XL included dual-climate automatic temperature controls and steering wheel-mounted audio and climate controls. The Touring trim offered faux aluminum and all-black leather interior, a sport-tuned suspension, unique powder-coated gray wheels, and a trunk lip-mounted spoiler. The XLS introduced standard cargo nets, six-disc CD changer, a power sliding-glass moonroof, electrochromic auto dimming rear-view and driver's side-view mirrors, four-way passenger power seat and a HomeLink transceiver. The high-end Limited trim offered air-ventilated seats with a power driver's seat cushion length adjuster, Toyota's Smart Key System with keyless push-button start and entry, a quieter acoustic windshield, rain-sensing windshield wipers, an upgraded 12-speaker JBL audio system, "in-glass" LED turn signals on the side mirrors and a wood-trimmed steering wheel and shift gear lever. A navigation system was optional for every trim level other than the XL version. The Avalon had a flat rear floor design and reclining rear seats. Vehicle Stability Control was optional on all trim levels. Other options included a keyless Remote Engine Start, glass breakage sensor, rear window power sunshade and, on Limited models, a Dynamic Laser Cruise Control system. HID lighting with auto-leveling was standard on Touring and Limited grades.

On 5 December 2011, Toyota announced that Toyota Avalons assembled in the US would be exported to South Korea and shipped from Port of Hueneme in Oxnard, California.

=== Yearly changes ===
First facelift

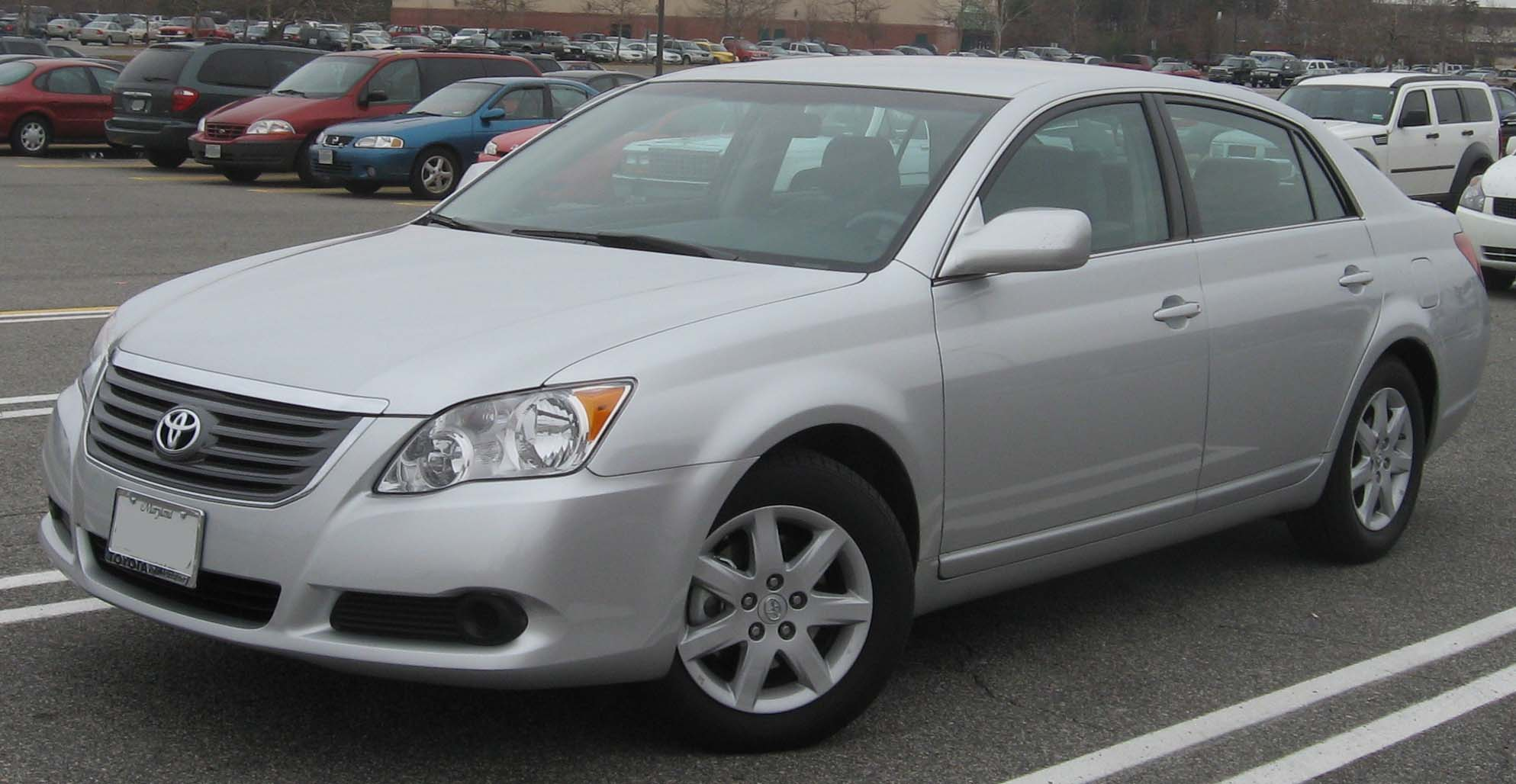
2008 Toyota Avalon XL

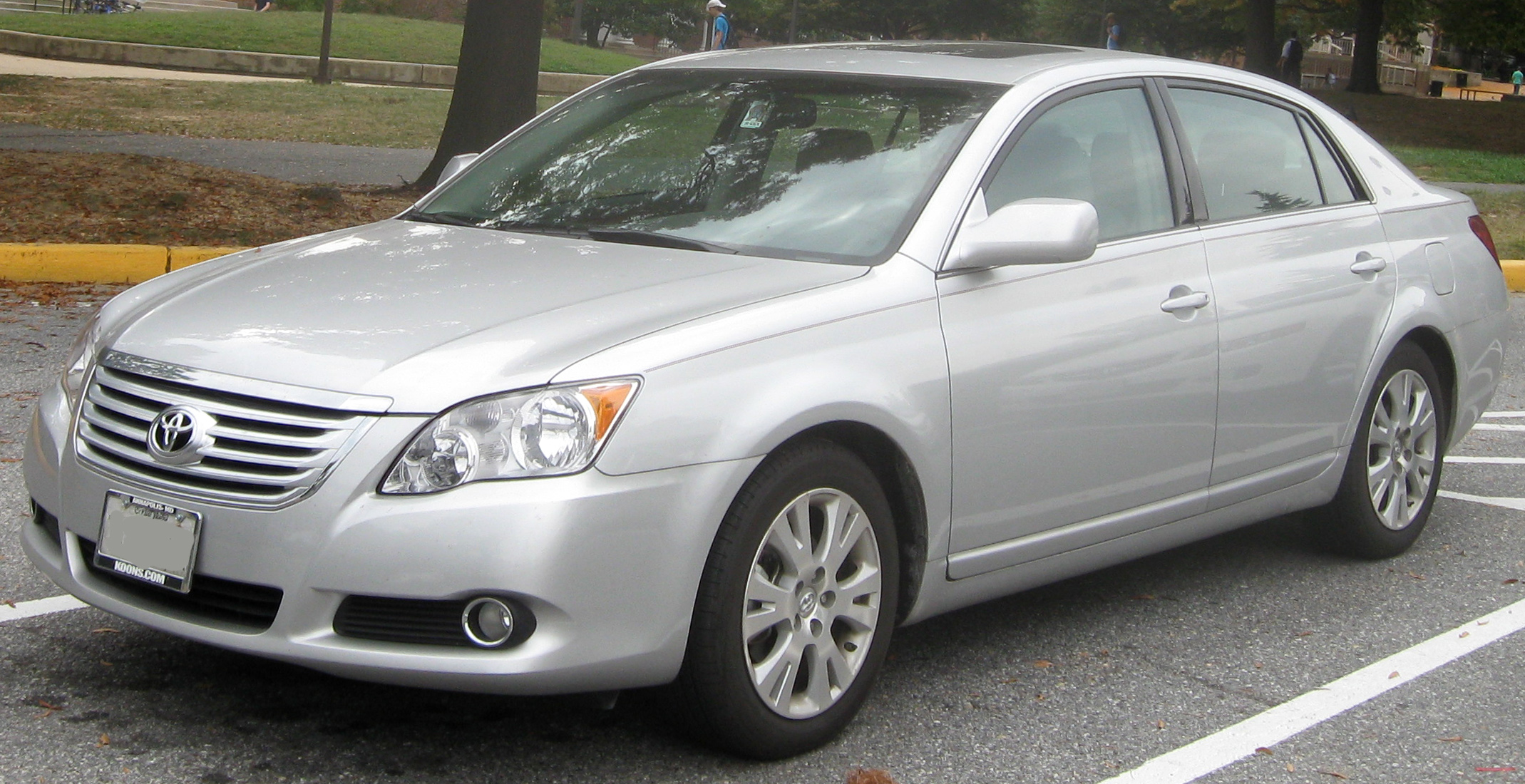

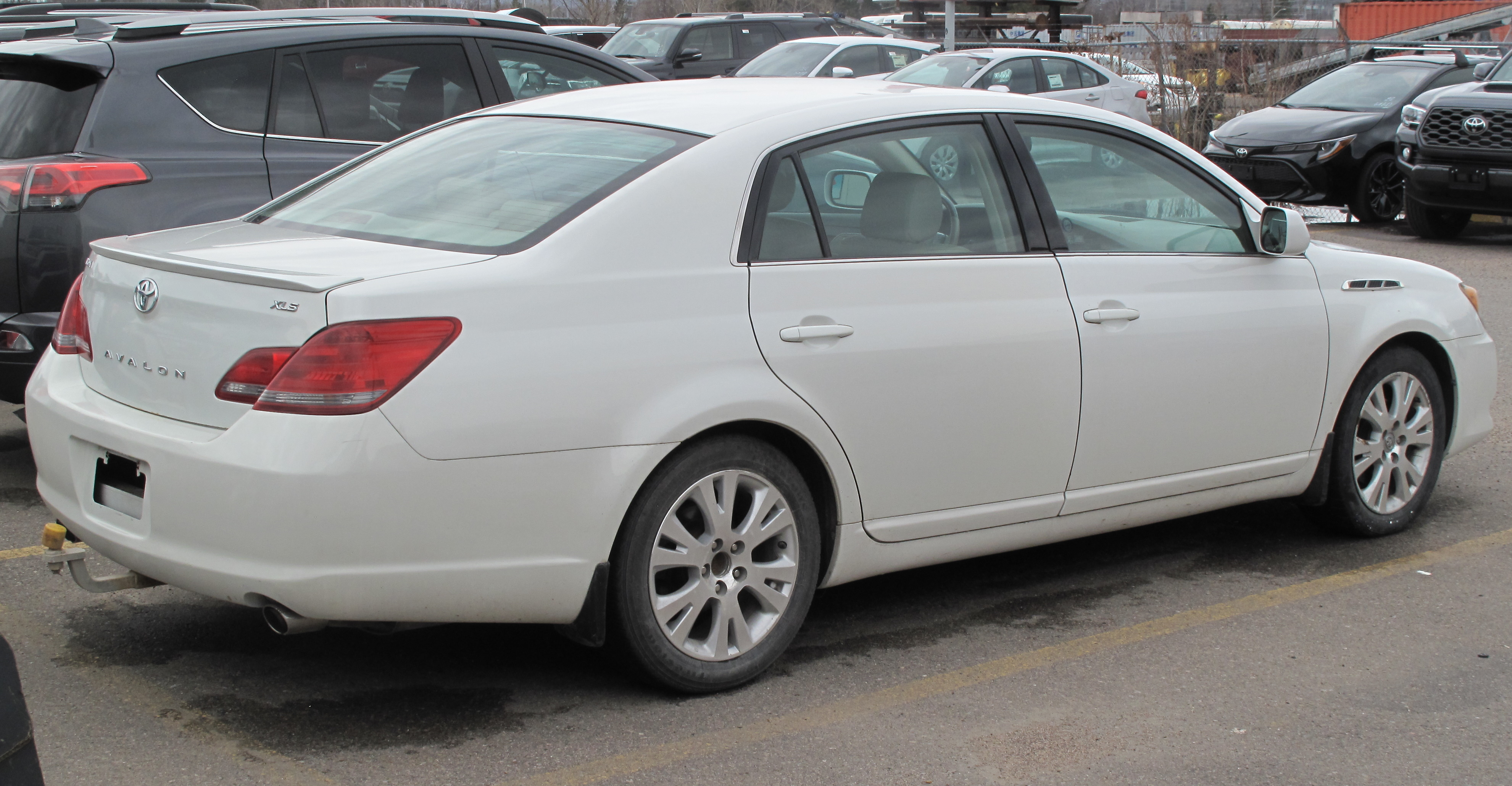
2008 Toyota Avalon XLS

- 2005, for the 2006 model year: Toyota expanded the availability of Vehicle Stability Control to XL and Touring trim levels.
- 2006, for the 2007 model year: the tire pressure monitoring system became standard across all trims and the navigation system made optional for the Touring trim level.
- 2007, for the 2008 model year: Avalon released received a mild facelift. Rear tail lights received subtle tinting, and the front fascia was redesigned. Other changes included a six-speed automatic transmission, chrome exterior door handles for the "Limited" trim, restyled alloy wheels for the "Touring" and "XLS" trims, a built-in remote key, upgraded rear brakes, and Bluetooth integration with all JBL Synthesis audio systems. "Touring" models received a color-keyed grille, "XLS" and "Limited" models had a chrome grille, and all models included an in-dash six-CD changer.
- 2008, for the 2009 model year: Avalon offered a few changes: Vehicle Stability Control [VSC] became standard on all trim levels, and the Touring version was no longer offered. XLS and Limited leather seats now offered a Dark Charcoal color, and the Indigo Ink Pearl exterior color was replaced with Cocoa Bean Metallic.
- 2009, for the 2010 model year: Offered two updates: all passenger windows received an automatic up/down function, as opposed to just the driver and front passenger's side, and a new accelerator pedal was redesigned.
Second facelift

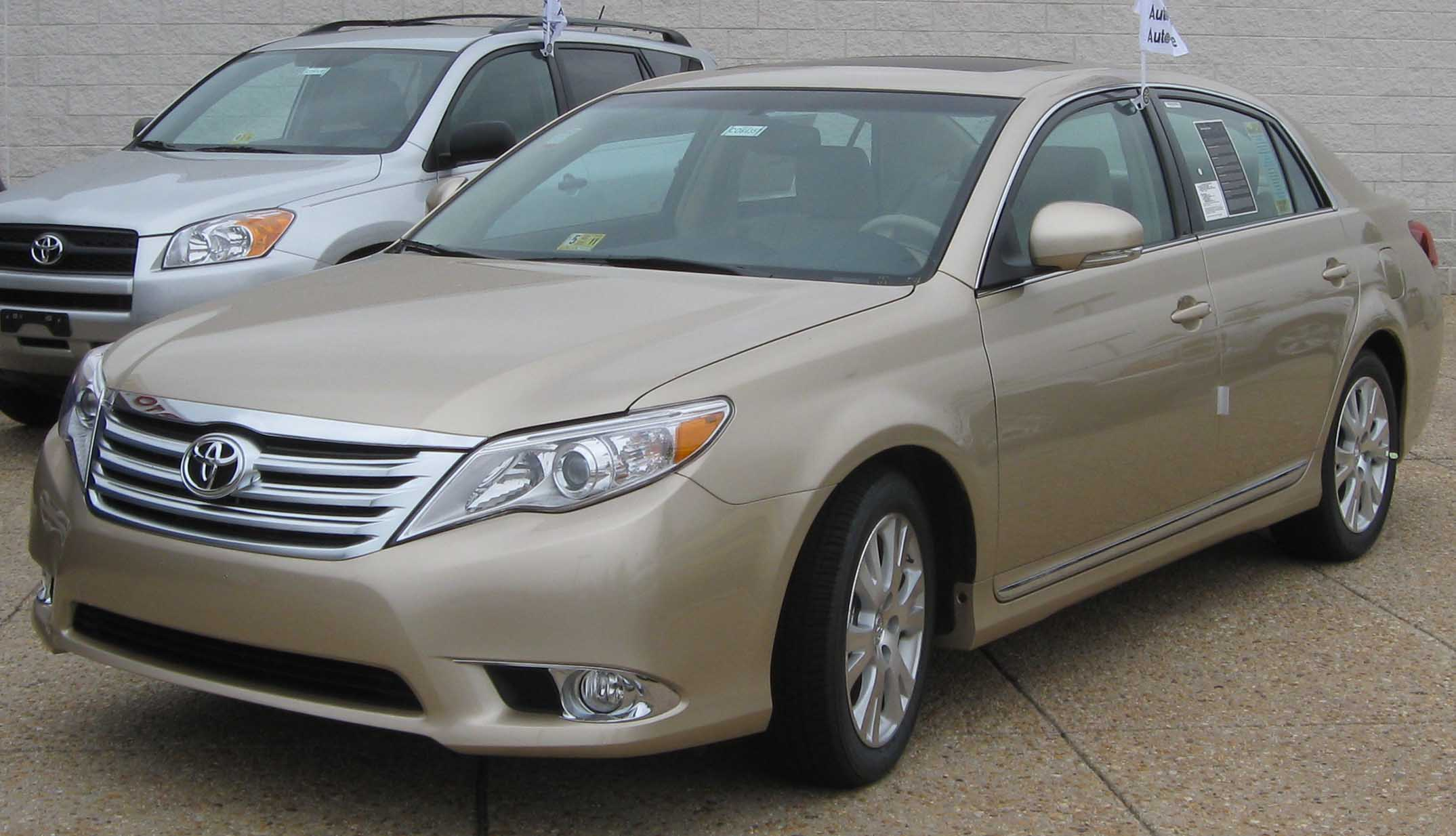
2011 MY Toyota Avalon Limited

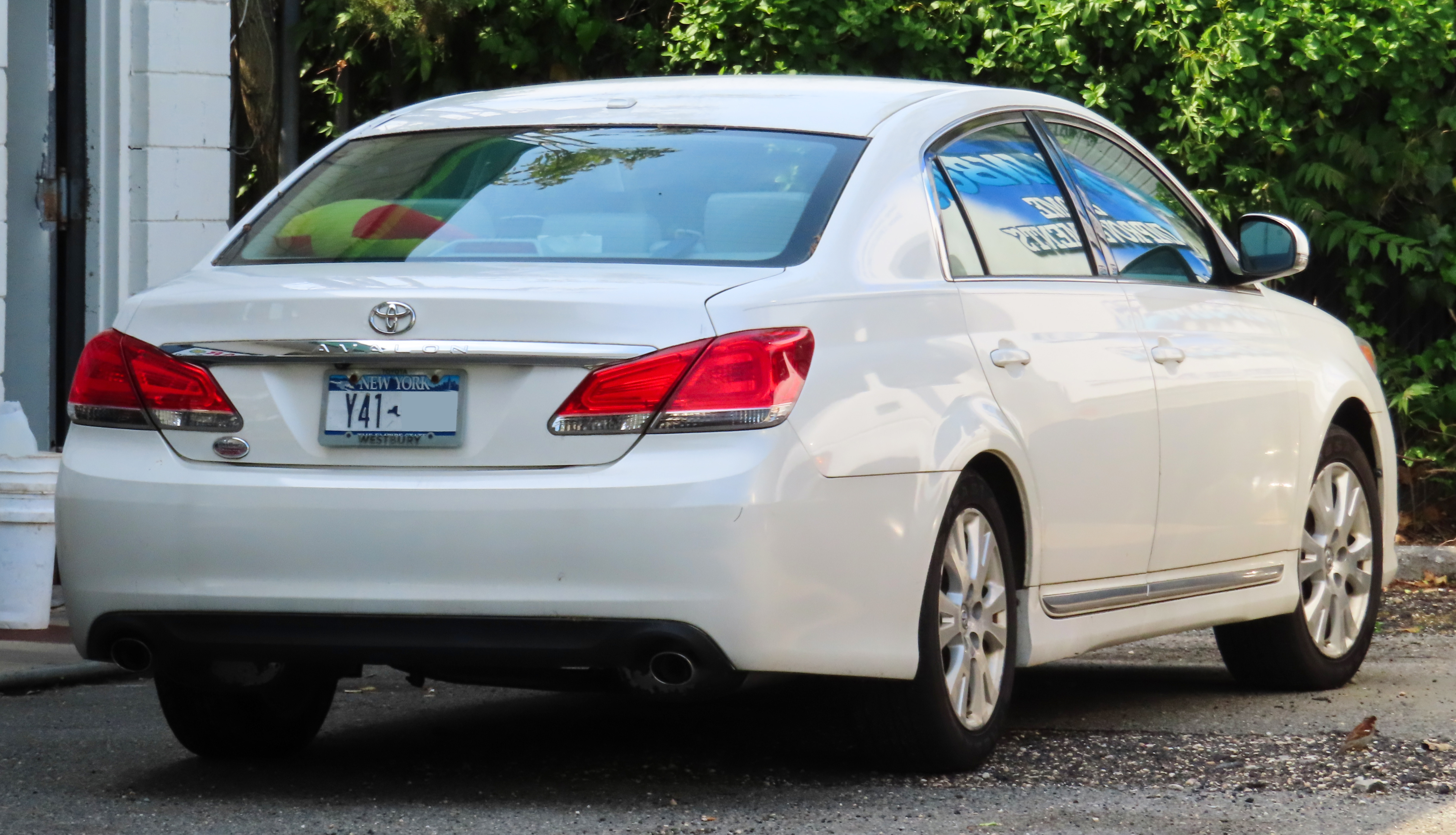
2011 MY Toyota Avalon

- 2010, for the 2011 model year: The facelifted Avalon went on sale in April 2010, with revised styling and only two trim lines: a base Avalon model and a more upscale Limited trim. A backup camera became standard using either the rear view mirror or navigation screen for a display, and exterior side mirrors with integrated turn signals now folded in. The updated navigation system now had real-time traffic updates. Other changes included a redesigned instrument cluster and center console, new wood-style trim, new sheetmetal, and a different rear and front fascia design. The front and tail lights included LED piping, and fuel economy was slightly improved to an EPA-estimated 20/29/23 (city/highway/combined) mpg rating. The revised Avalon had a new brake-override control. It had an improved suspension system and a 12-speaker JBL Synthesis system which was only available on the Limited trim. 17" wheels were also standard on both trims although the Limited model has 10 spokes. Other exterior differences on the Limited included HID projector headlamps.

=== Safety ===
The Avalon came standard with anti-lock brakes, electronic brakeforce distribution, brake assist, dual front airbags, front row side torso airbags, front and rear side curtain airbags, and a driver's knee airbag. For 2009 models, Vehicle Stability Control and traction control became standard while active head restraints were added. In 2010, the Star Safety System was added for the 2011 model year.

The Avalon was subject to the 2009–11 Toyota vehicle recalls. 2011 and later model years come standard with a brake-override system.

The Avalon received a "Good" overall score in both the Insurance Institute for Highway Safety (IIHS) frontal offset and side impact tests. In 2009, with the new head restraints the IIHS awarded the Avalon its Top Safety Pick accolade.

A "Good" rating in IIHS the roof strength test IIHS earned the 2011 model year the organization's "Top Safety Pick 2010" designation. The 2011 model year also received the "Top Safety Pick 2011" recommendation.

NHTSA crash test ratings (2006):
Frontal Driver:	5/5 stars
Frontal Passenger:	5/5 stars
Side Driver:	5/5 stars
Side Rear Passenger:	5/5 stars
Rollover:	(2006) (2011)

=== Reception ===
Car and Driver, which had called previous Avalons "Japanese Buicks," rated it at the top of a group of large premium sedans in 2005. Edmunds.com, Motor Trend and Automobile Magazine also rated it top in their own comparisons. Consumer Reports rated the Avalon at the top of its tested group in the large and upscale category, scoring ahead of five other sedans in the January 2010 issue. In 2010, the 2011 model year Avalon competed against the Ford Taurus and received first place awards from Motor Trend.

== Fourth generation (XX40; 2012) ==
Fourth generation
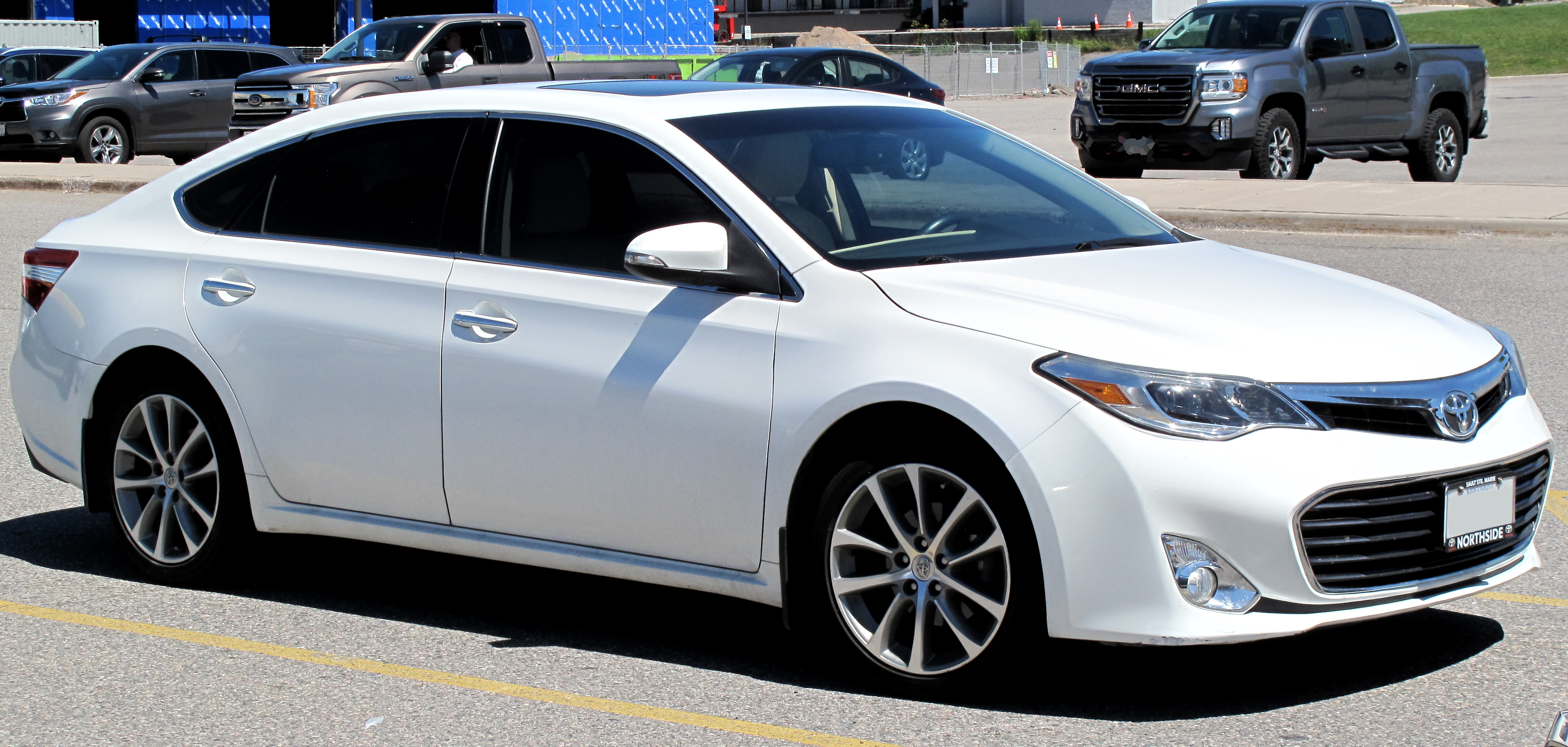
- 2014 Toyota Avalon XLE Touring (GSX40, Canada)

Overview
- Model code: XX40
- Production: November 2012 – March 2018
- Model years: 2013–2018
- Assembly: United States: Georgetown, Kentucky (TMMK)
- Designer: Kevin Hunter and Ian Cartabiano (2010)

Body and chassis
- Layout: Front-engine, front-wheel-drive
- Platform: Toyota K platform
- Related: Lexus ES (XV60); Toyota Camry (XV50)

Powertrain
- Engine: 3.5 L 2GR-FE V6; 2.5 L 2AR-FXE I4 (hybrid)
- Transmission: 6-speed automatic; eCVT (hybrid)
- Hybrid drivetrain: Power-split

Dimensions
- Wheelbase: 111.0 in (2,820 mm)
- Length: 196.0 in (4,978 mm)
- Width: 72.2 in (1,835 mm)
- Height: 57.5 in (1,460 mm)
- Curb weight: 3,472–3,594 lb (1,575–1,630 kg)

The redesigned Avalon was partially revealed at the New York International Auto Show in April 2012, to be based on the same platform as the Lexus ES. A new grille was part of the redesign with redesigned lights that were now similar to the Camry. The interior controls have tap touch technology instead of buttons.

In June 2012, Toyota announced the Avalon would offer a hybrid powertrain. The Avalon went on sale in the US at the beginning of December 2012. On October 1, 2013, Toyota Korea announced that the All New Avalon Limited will be sold in South Korea.

=== Hybrid version ===
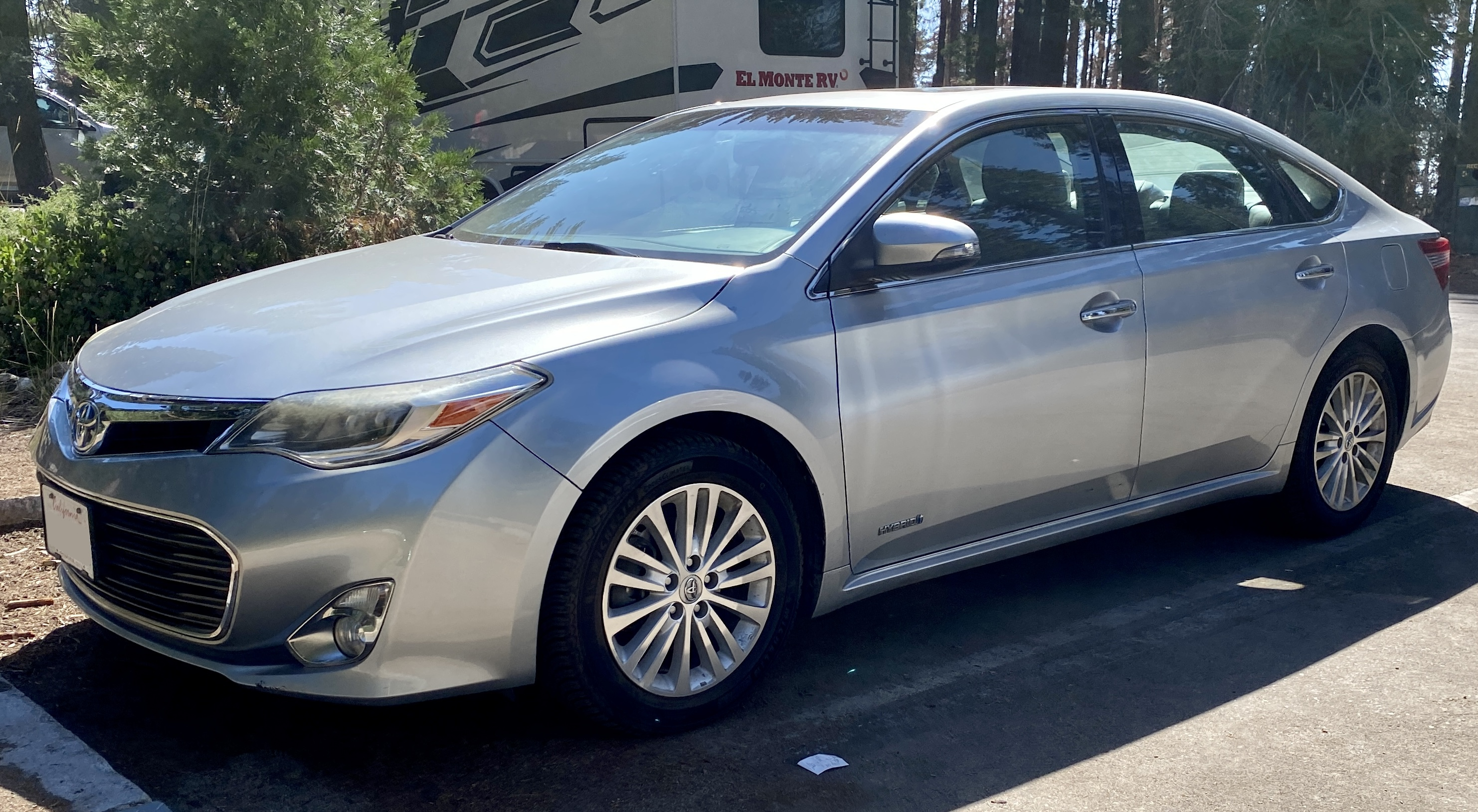
2015 Toyota Avalon Hybrid (US)

The hybrid gasoline-electric model of the 2013 model year Avalon uses the revised version of Toyota's Hybrid Synergy Drive power train, similar to the one powering the 2012 model year Camry Hybrid. The U.S. Environmental Protection Agency rated the Avalon Hybrid as 40 mpg_{‑US} (5.9 L/100 km; 48 mpg_{‑imp}) on combined cycle, 40 mpg_{‑US} (5.9 L/100 km; 48 mpg_{‑imp}) on city, and 39 mpg_{‑US} (6.0 L/100 km; 47 mpg_{‑imp}) on highway driving. The hybrid version went on sale in the United States in December 2012. The Avalon Hybrid comes with a 2.5 L inline-4 engine. When combined with the electric motor the system has a total output of 200 bhp (149 kW). The Avalon Hybrid uses a 1.6 kWh sealed nickel-metal hydride traction battery, the same as the Camry Hybrid.

=== 2012 SEMA concepts (2012) ===
The 2013 model year TRD Edition is a concept car developed by Toyota Racing Development. It includes a supercharged 3.5-liter V6 engine with Eaton Gen 6 TVS rotor assembly, six-speed automatic transmission, six-piston front & four-piston rear calipers, burgundy body color, tinted taillights, color-keyed grille and dual exhaust with polished mufflers, 19-inch wheels with Michelin 225/40R19 tires, a red stitching touch on the instrument and door panels, seats red stitching and accent piping and a JBL GreenEdge surround-sound system.

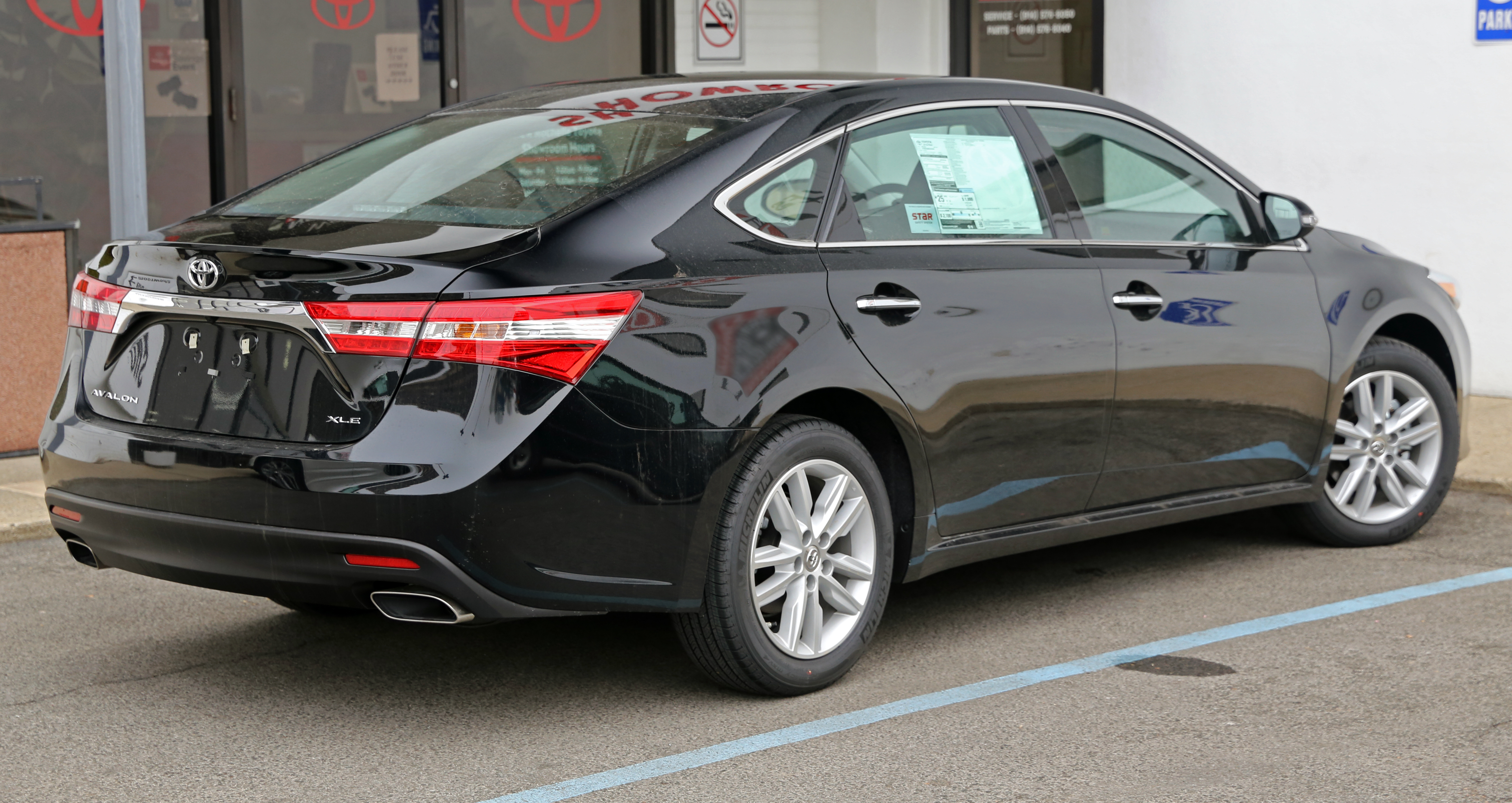
2014 Avalon XLE (US)

The 2013 model year HV Edition is based on the hybrid model. It includes 19-inch wheels with Michelin Pilot Super Sport 225/40R19 tires, JBL GreenEdge surround-sound system with 15-speakers, hybrid-blue headlights, turn signals, bright white with electric blue body color and the suspension and braking system from the 2013 model year TRD Edition.

The 2013 model year DUB Edition includes 22-inch-deep concave custom made satin black TIS wheels with Pirelli tires, lower sport suspension, custom body kit, tinted windows, taillights, emblems and plush diamond patterned suede seats. It was built by DUB Magazine.

The vehicles were unveiled at the 2012 SEMA Show.

=== Facelift (2015) ===
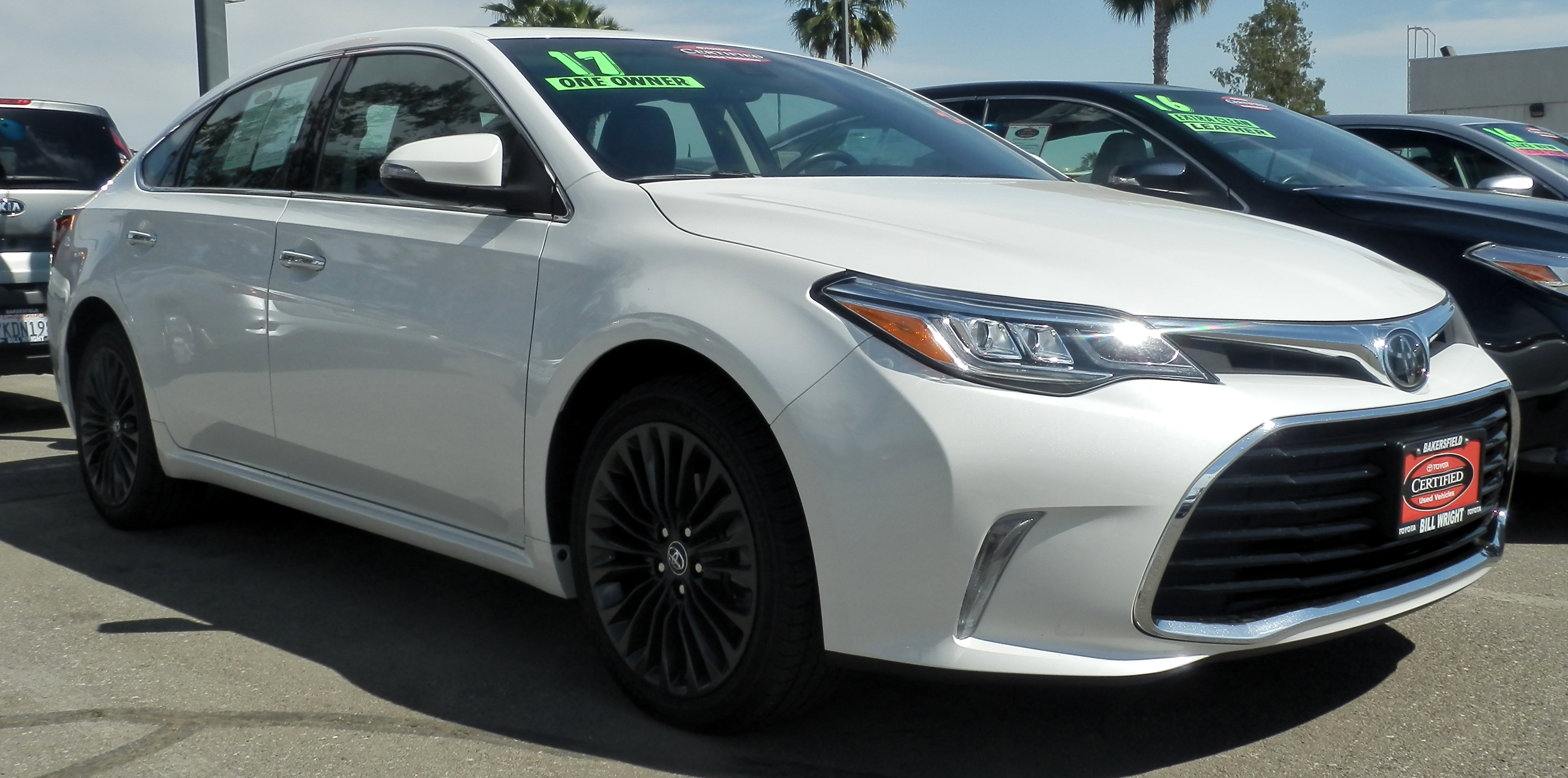
Facelift Avalon (US)

In 2015, for the 2016 model year, the Avalon received a facelift which was first shown at the February 2015 Chicago Auto Show. Changes include a new front grille, updated suspension to improve ride comfort, revised wheel designs, and standard Toyota Safety Sense P. The "Touring" trim was also reintroduced for this facelift, this time as a more sporty variant of the top-of-the-line "Limited" trim.

== Fifth generation (XX50; 2018) ==
Fifth generation
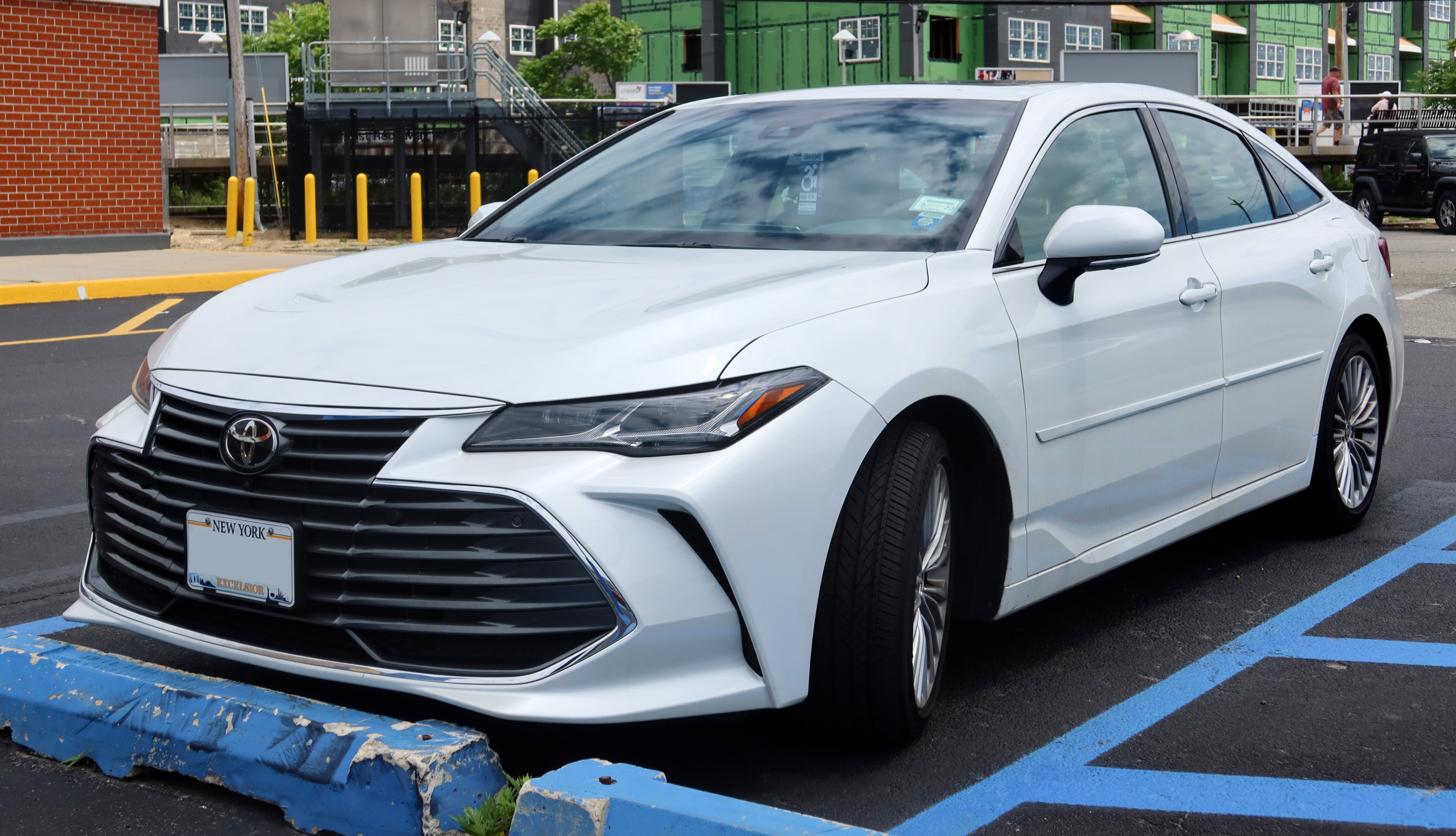
- 2020 Toyota Avalon Limited (GSX50; pre-facelift, US)

Overview
- Model code: XX50
- Production: April 2018 – August 2022 (US); 2019–present (China)
- Model years: 2019–2022 (US)
- Assembly: United States: Georgetown, Kentucky (TMMK); China: Tianjin (2019–2022: TFTM); China: Sichuan (2021–present: SFTM)
- Designer: Randy Stephens (2015)

Body and chassis
- Layout: Front-engine, front-wheel-drive; Front-engine, four-wheel-drive (2020–2022)
- Platform: TNGA: GA-K
- Related: Lexus ES (XZ10); Toyota Camry (XV70)

Powertrain
- Engine: Gasoline; 2.0 L M20A-FKS I4 (gasoline); 2.0 L M20D-FKS I4 (gasoline, China); 2.5 L A25A-FKS I4 (gasoline, AWD); 2.5 L A25G-FKS I4 (gasoline, China); 3.5 L 2GR-FKS V6 (gasoline); Hybrid; 2.5 L A25A-FXS I4 (hybrid); 2.5 L A25H-FXS I4 (hybrid, China)
- Transmission: K120 CVT with physical first gear (2.0 L I4); 8-speed Direct Shift automatic (2.5 L I4 & 3.5 L V6); eCVT (hybrid)
- Hybrid drivetrain: Power-split
- Battery: 1.0 kW·h 259V Li-ion

Dimensions
- Wheelbase: 113.0 in (2,870 mm)
- Length: 196.0 in (4,978 mm)
- Width: 72.8 in (1,849 mm)
- Height: 56.5 in (1,435 mm)
- Curb weight: 3,560–3,715 lb (1,615–1,685 kg)

Chronology
- Predecessor: Toyota Crown (S210) (China)
- Successor: Toyota Crown (S235) (North America and Middle East)

The fifth-generation Avalon debuted at the January 2018 North American International Auto Show in Detroit, and went on sale in the US in May 2018. It is built on GA-K platform shared with the XZ10 series Lexus ES. Four trim levels offered in North America are XLE, XSE, Touring and Limited, as well as XLE, XSE and Limited versions of the Avalon Hybrid. An optional adaptive suspension is found in the Touring trim.

Production and assembly of the fifth-generation Avalon is at both Toyota Motor Manufacturing Kentucky (TMMK) plant in Georgetown, Kentucky, and Tianjin FAW Toyota Motor Co., Ltd. (TFTM) plant in Tianjin, China, from 2019 until 2022. In 2021, assembly of the Avalon for the Chinese market by Sichuan FAW Toyota Motor Co., Ltd. (SFTM) commenced.

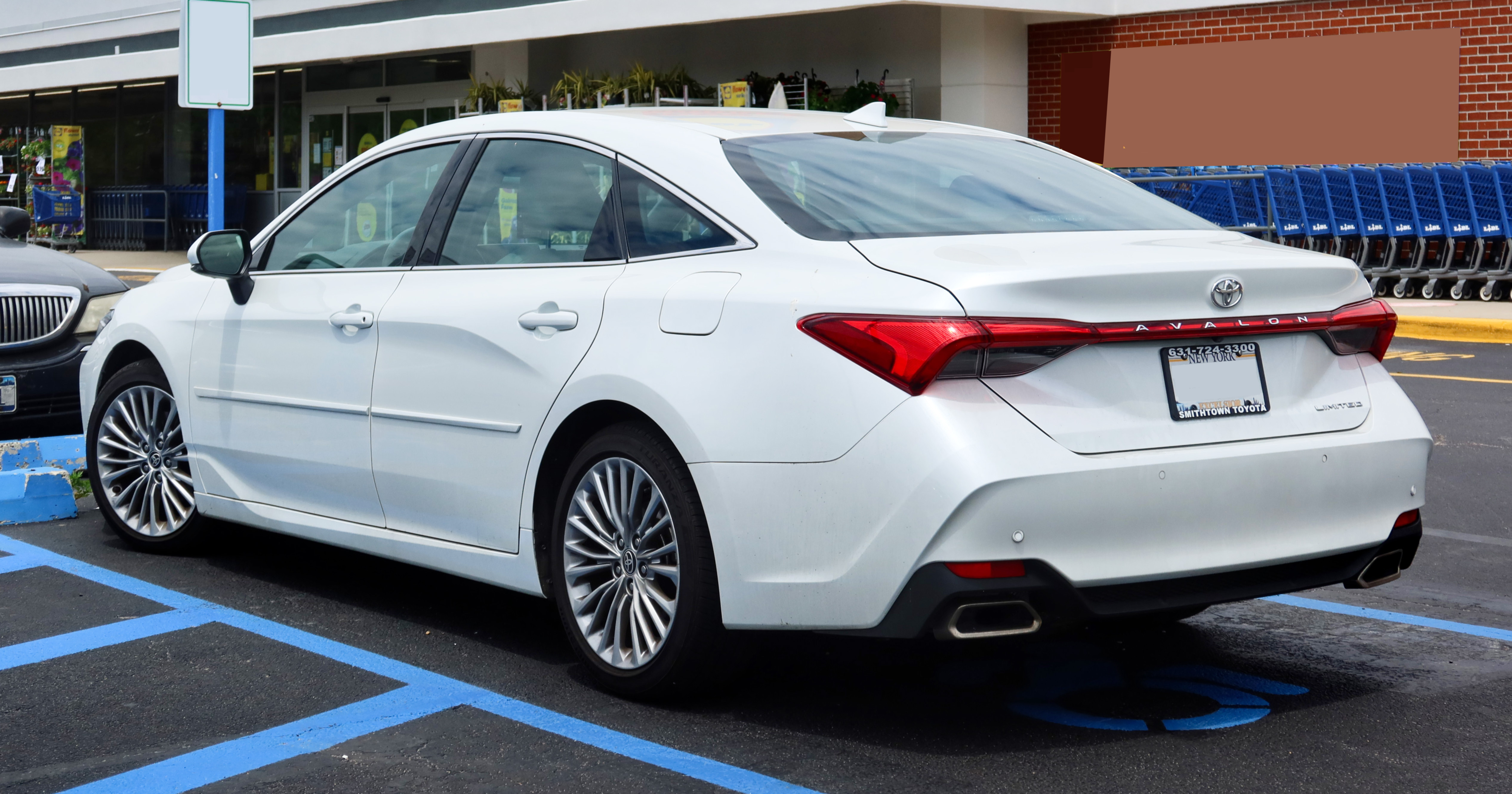
2020 Toyota Avalon Limited (GSX50; pre-facelift, US)

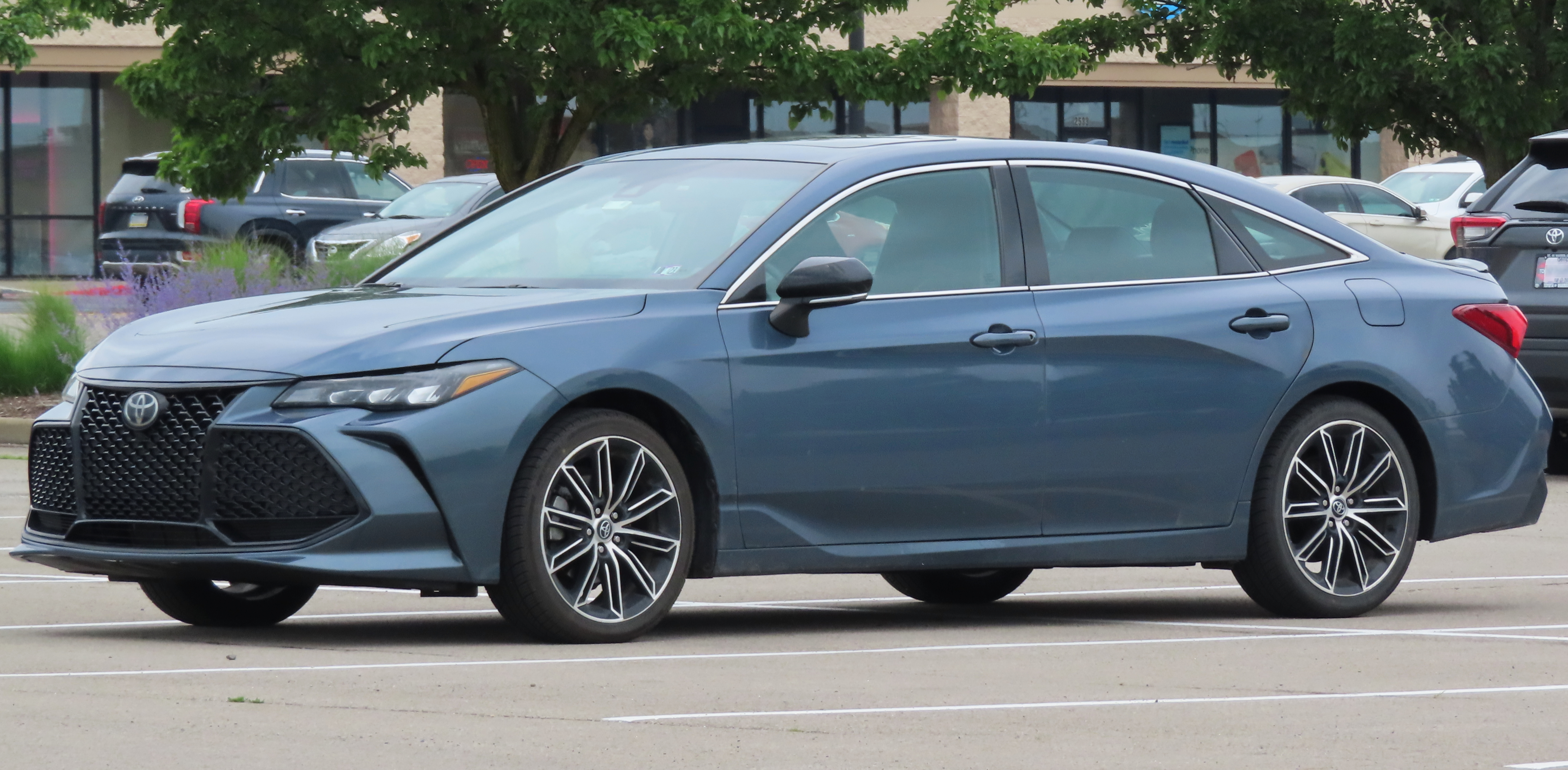
2019 Toyota Avalon XSE (GSX50; pre-facelift, US)

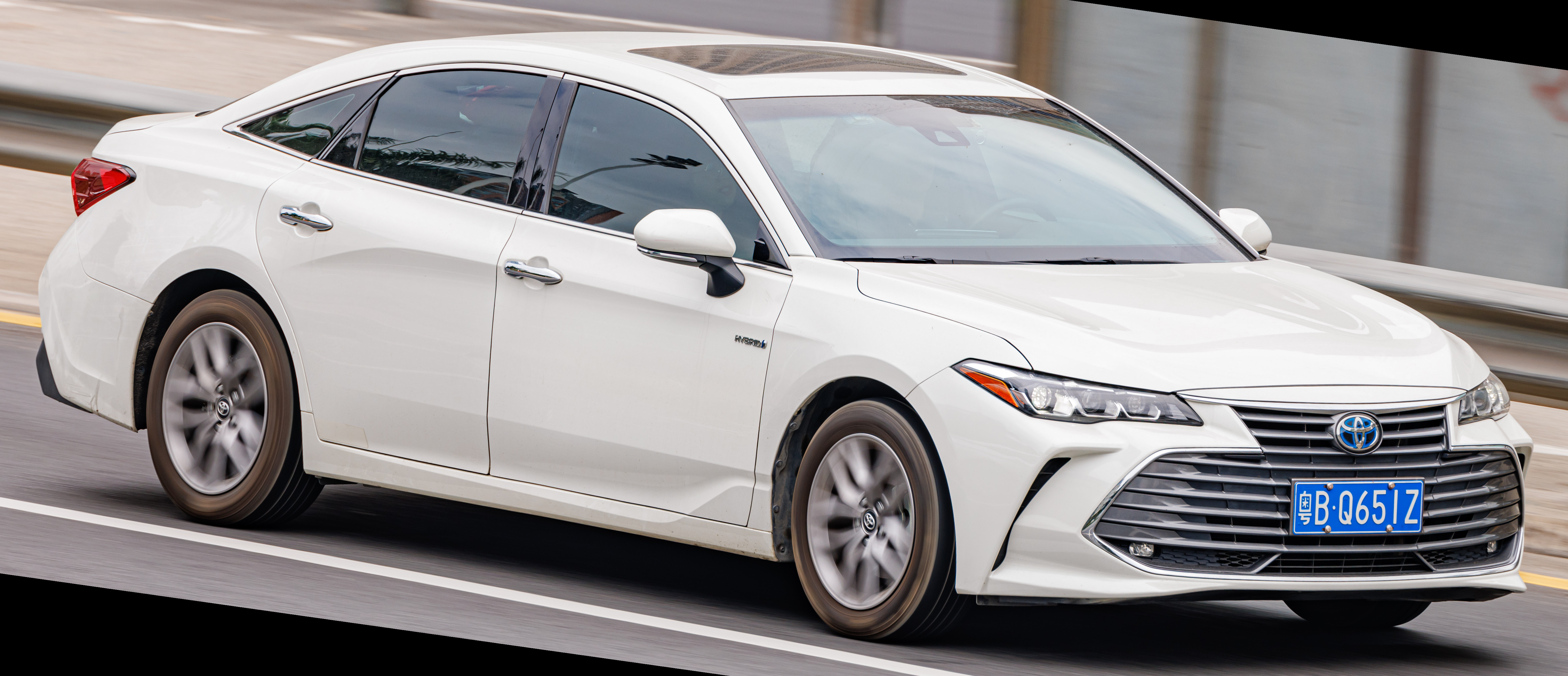
Toyota Avalon Hybrid (AXXH50; pre-facelift, China)

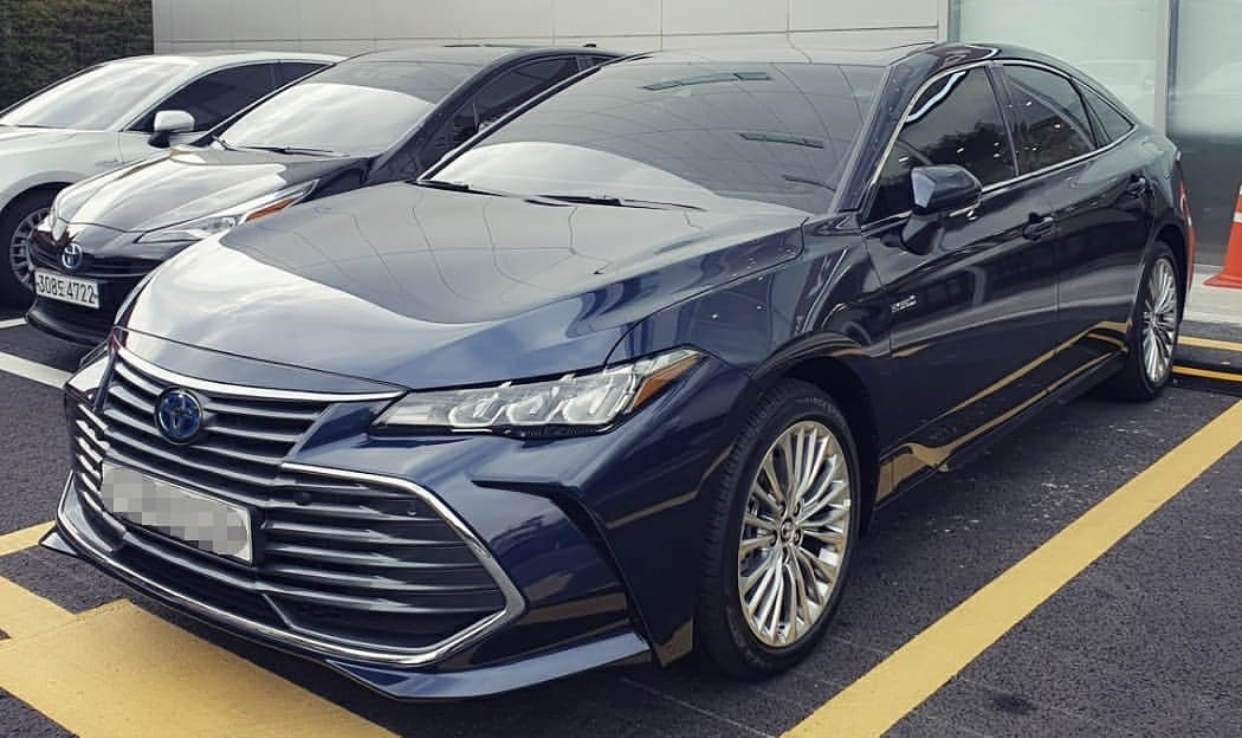
2020 Toyota Avalon Hybrid XLE (GSX50; pre-facelift, Korea)

=== Powertrain ===
Four engine choices, shared with the XV70 series Camry, are offered: a 2.0 L M20A-FKS I4 with 175 hp (130 kW; 177 PS) (only available in China), a 2.5 L A25A-FKS inline-four with 207 hp (154 kW; 210 PS), a 3.5 L 2GR-FKS V6 with 301 hp (224 kW; 305 PS), and a hybrid powertrain consisting of a 2.5 L 176 hp (131 kW; 178 PS) A25A-FXS I4 coupled with a 118 hp (88 kW; 120 PS) electric motor; combined power output is 215 hp (160 kW; 218 PS). The hybrid is set up similarly to the redesigned Camry hybrid with a NiMH battery pack, though unlike the Camry hybrid, a li-ion battery is not offered. The EPA rated the V6 at 22 mpg_{‑US} (11 L/100 km; 26 mpg_{‑imp}) on city, 32 mpg_{‑US} (7.4 L/100 km; 38 mpg_{‑imp}) on highway driving, and 25 mpg_{‑US} (9.4 L/100 km; 30 mpg_{‑imp}) on combined cycle. The Avalon Hybrid is rated up to 43 mpg_{‑US} (5.5 L/100 km; 52 mpg_{‑imp}) on city driving and 44 mpg_{‑US} (5.3 L/100 km; 53 mpg_{‑imp}) on both highway driving and combined cycle.

Powertrains (China)
Model year	Engine			Motor		System total power	Transmission
Model year	Type	Power	Torque	Power	Torque	System total power	Transmission
Gasoline
2019–22	2.0L M20A/M20E	176 hp (131 kW; 178 PS) at 6,600 rpm	210 N⋅m (155 lb⋅ft) at 4,400–5,200 rpm	—	—	176 hp (131 kW; 178 PS)	CVT (belt)
2023	2.0 L M20E	175 hp (130 kW; 177 PS) at 6,600 rpm	207 N⋅m (153 lb⋅ft) at 4,400–5,000 rpm	—	—	175 hp (130 kW; 177 PS)	CVT (belt)
2024–present	2.0 L M20E	170 hp (127 kW; 172 PS) at 6,600 rpm	206 N⋅m (152 lb⋅ft) at 4,600–5,000 rpm	—	—	170 hp (127 kW; 172 PS)	CVT (belt)
2019–22	2.5 L A25A/A25G	206 hp (154 kW; 209 PS) at 6,600 rpm	250 N⋅m (184 lb⋅ft) at 5,000 rpm	—	—	206 hp (154 kW; 209 PS)	8-speed automatic
2023	2.5 L A25G	204 hp (152 kW; 207 PS) at 6,600 rpm	244 N⋅m (180 lb⋅ft) at 4,200–5,000 rpm	—	—	204 hp (152 kW; 207 PS)	8-speed automatic
Hybrid
2024–present	2.0 L M20G	150 hp (112 kW; 152 PS) at 6,000 rpm	188 N⋅m (139 lb⋅ft) at 4,400–5,200 rpm	111 hp (83 kW; 113 PS)	206 N⋅m (152 lb⋅ft)	194 hp (145 kW; 197 PS)	eCVT (planetary)
2019–21	2.5 L A25B	176 hp (131 kW; 178 PS) at 5,700 rpm	221 N⋅m (163 lb⋅ft) at 3,600–5,200 rpm	118 hp (88 kW; 120 PS)	202 N⋅m (149 lb⋅ft)	214 hp (160 kW; 217 PS)	eCVT (planetary)
2022–23	2.5 L A25H	176 hp (131 kW; 178 PS) at 5,700 rpm	221 N⋅m (163 lb⋅ft) at 3,600–5,200 rpm	118 hp (88 kW; 120 PS)	202 N⋅m (149 lb⋅ft)	214 hp (160 kW; 217 PS)	eCVT (planetary)
2024–present	2.5 L A25H	182 hp (136 kW; 185 PS) at 6,000 rpm	221 N⋅m (163 lb⋅ft) at 3,400–5,200 rpm	134 hp (100 kW; 136 PS)	208 N⋅m (153 lb⋅ft)	231 hp (172 kW; 234 PS)	eCVT (planetary)

=== Yearly changes ===
- 2019, for the 2020 model year: Toyota introduced the Avalon TRD alongside the Camry TRD. Based on the XSE trim, it uses the same 2GR-FKS V6 engine with sportier suspensions and sport exhaust system only found on TRD models.
- 2020, for the 2021 model year: The Avalon will be available in the US with a four-cylinder AWD variant. This will be available only with the 2.5-liter engine mated to the automatic transmission. Also, the 2021 model year Avalon gets a standard Android Auto and the XSE Nightshade trim level with black wheels, accents and badges. For the hybrid, the nickel-metal hydride battery was replaced by more compact lithium-ion battery pack.
- 2021, for the 2022 model year: The XSE Hybrid replaces the XSE Hybrid Nightshade Edition. Also, the XSE Nightshade, TRD, XLE AWD and Limited AWD models were dropped for the final model year in the US.

=== Discontinuation of US production ===
On 4 August 2021, Toyota announced that it would end production of the Avalon in the US after the 2022 model year as the market shifts towards SUVs and electrification. The Avalon was replaced by the S235 Crown crossover, marking the return of the Crown nameplate in North America after a 50-year absence. The Avalon remains in production in China, manufactured in its local facility.

=== Facelifts ===
==== First facelift (2022) ====
The first facelifted Avalon for the Chinese market was launched on 28 March 2022, it retained the five trim levels from the pre-facelift model such as Progressive, Deluxe, XLE, Touring and Limited. It is the first time that the Avalon was not sold in North America and became a Chinese-exclusive model after it was replaced with the Crown.

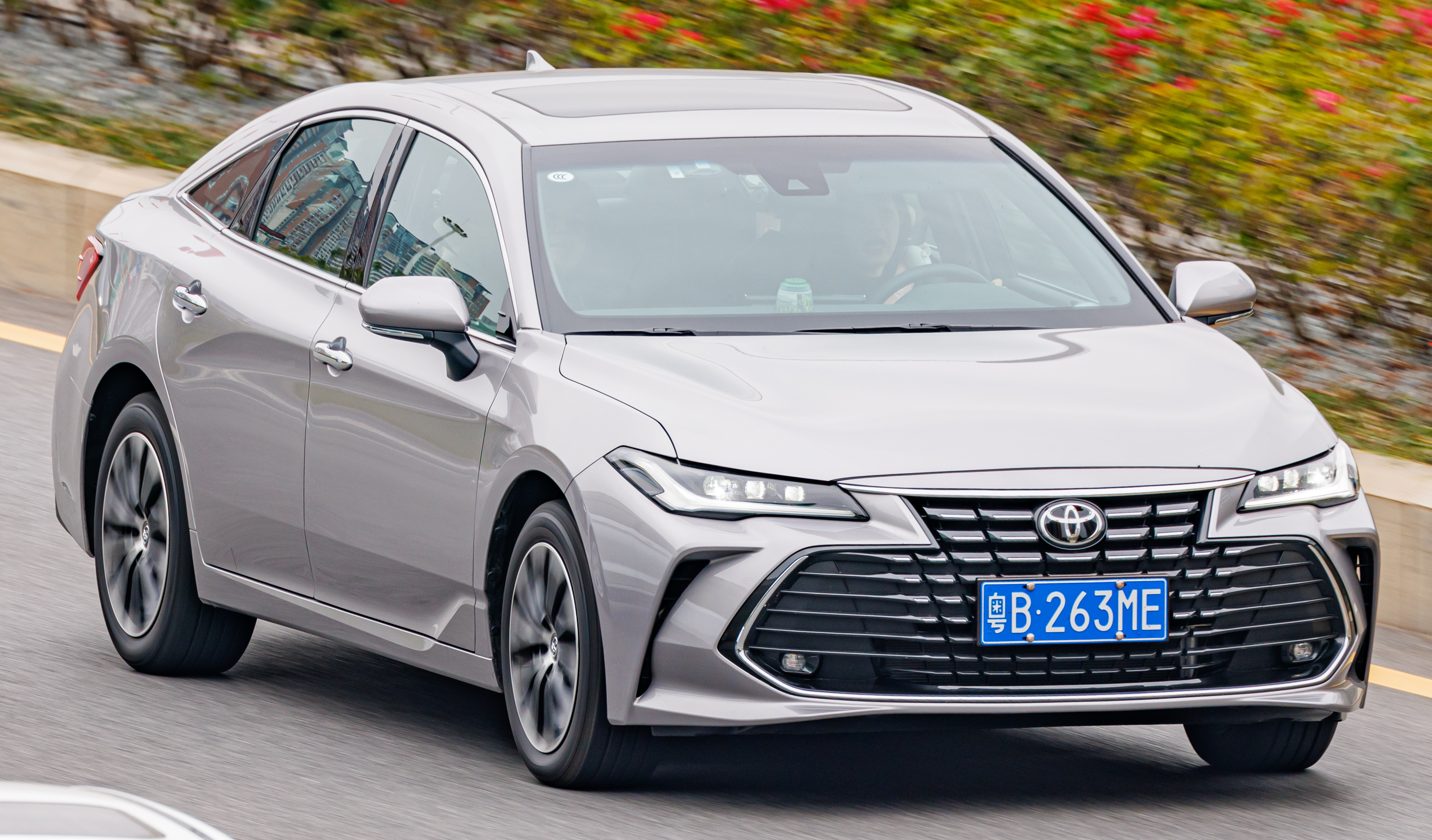
2022 Toyota Avalon XLE (GSX50; 2022 facelift, China)

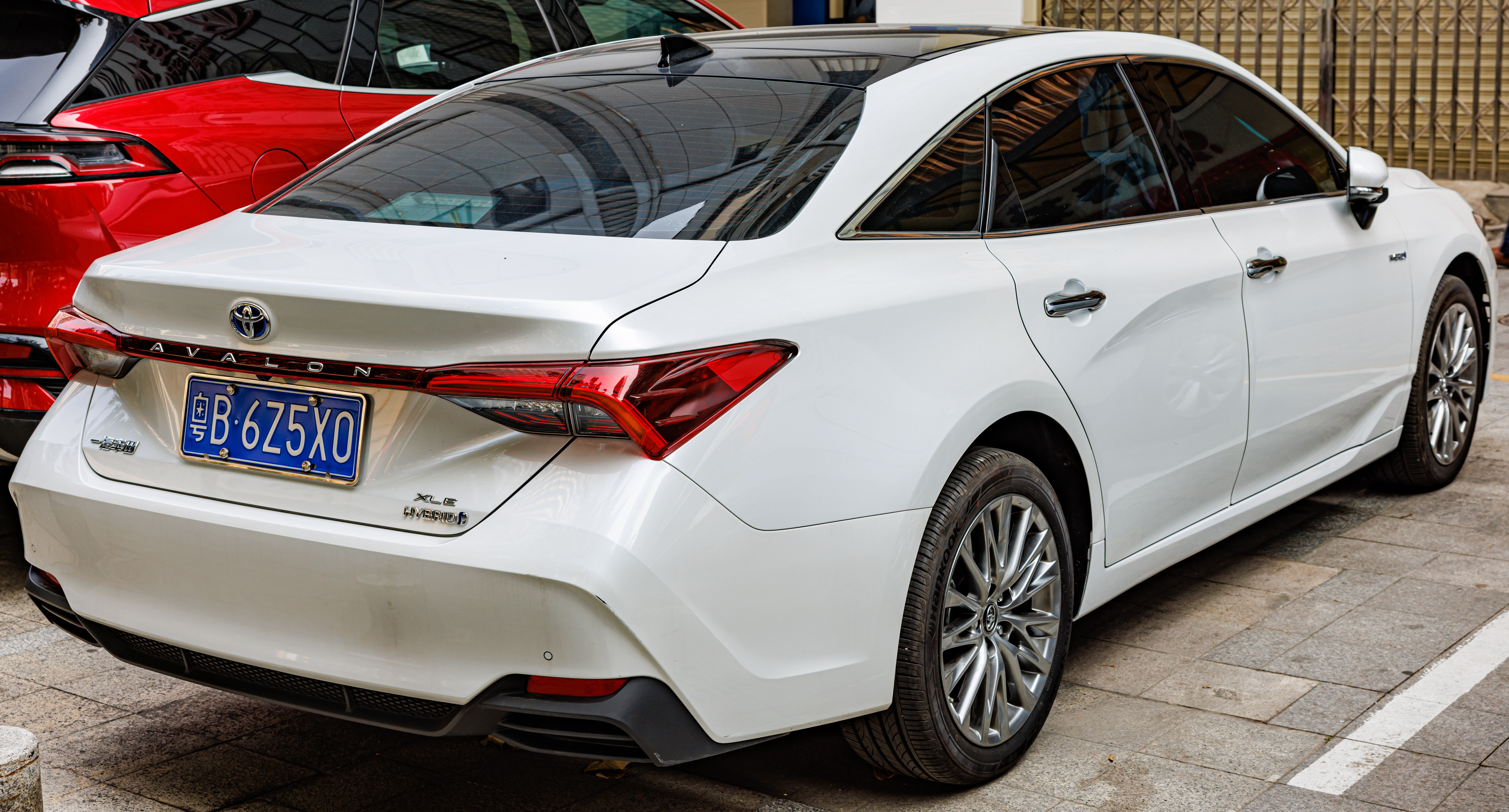
2022 Toyota Avalon Hybrid XLE (AXXH50; 2022 facelift, China)

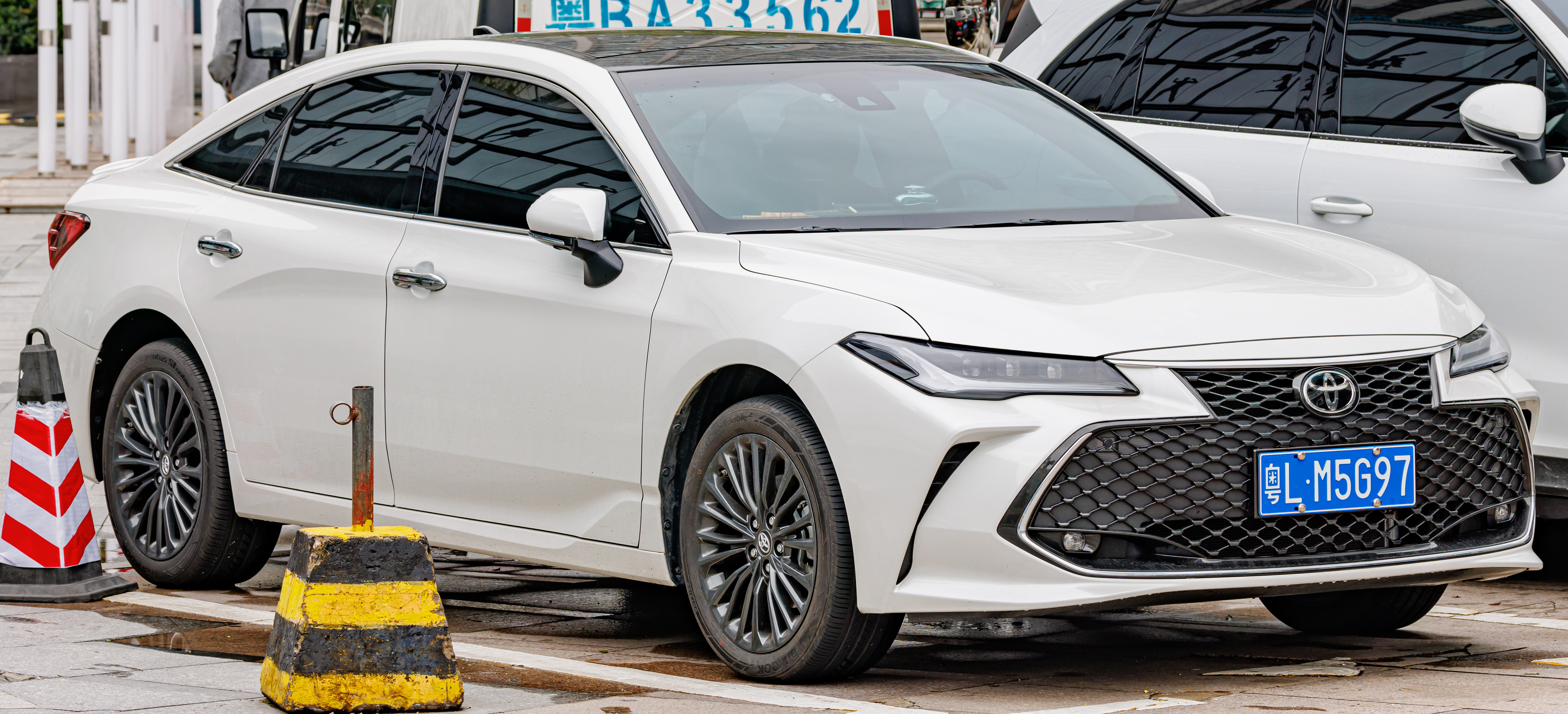
2022 Toyota Avalon Touring (GSX50; 2022 facelift, China)

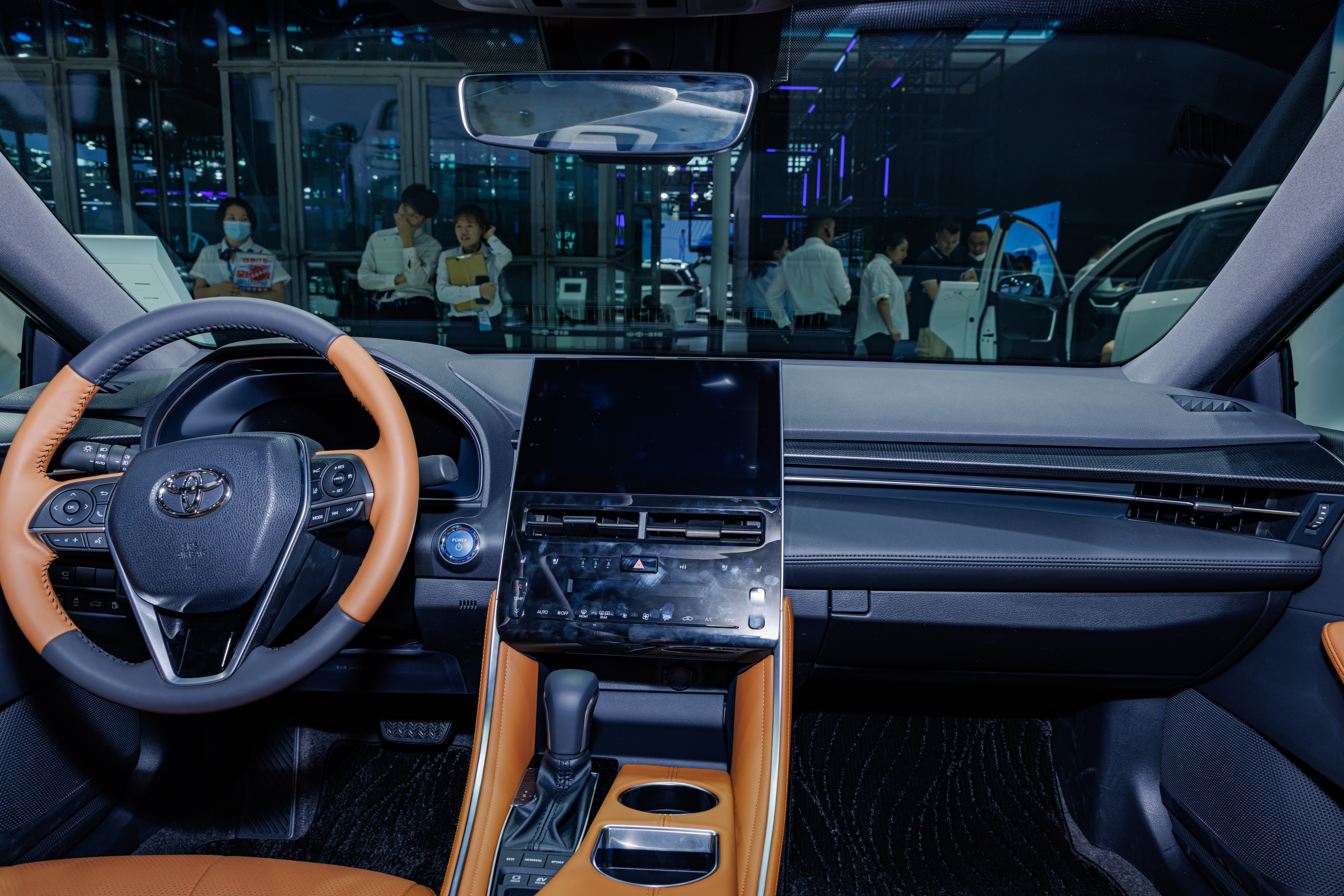
2022 Toyota Avalon Hybrid XLE interior (AXXH50; 2022 facelift, China)

==== Second facelift (2024) ====
The second facelifted Avalon for the Chinese market was launched in July 2024. It features a redesigned front fascia, new alloys and the interior gets a 12.3-inch touchscreen and a new steering wheel.

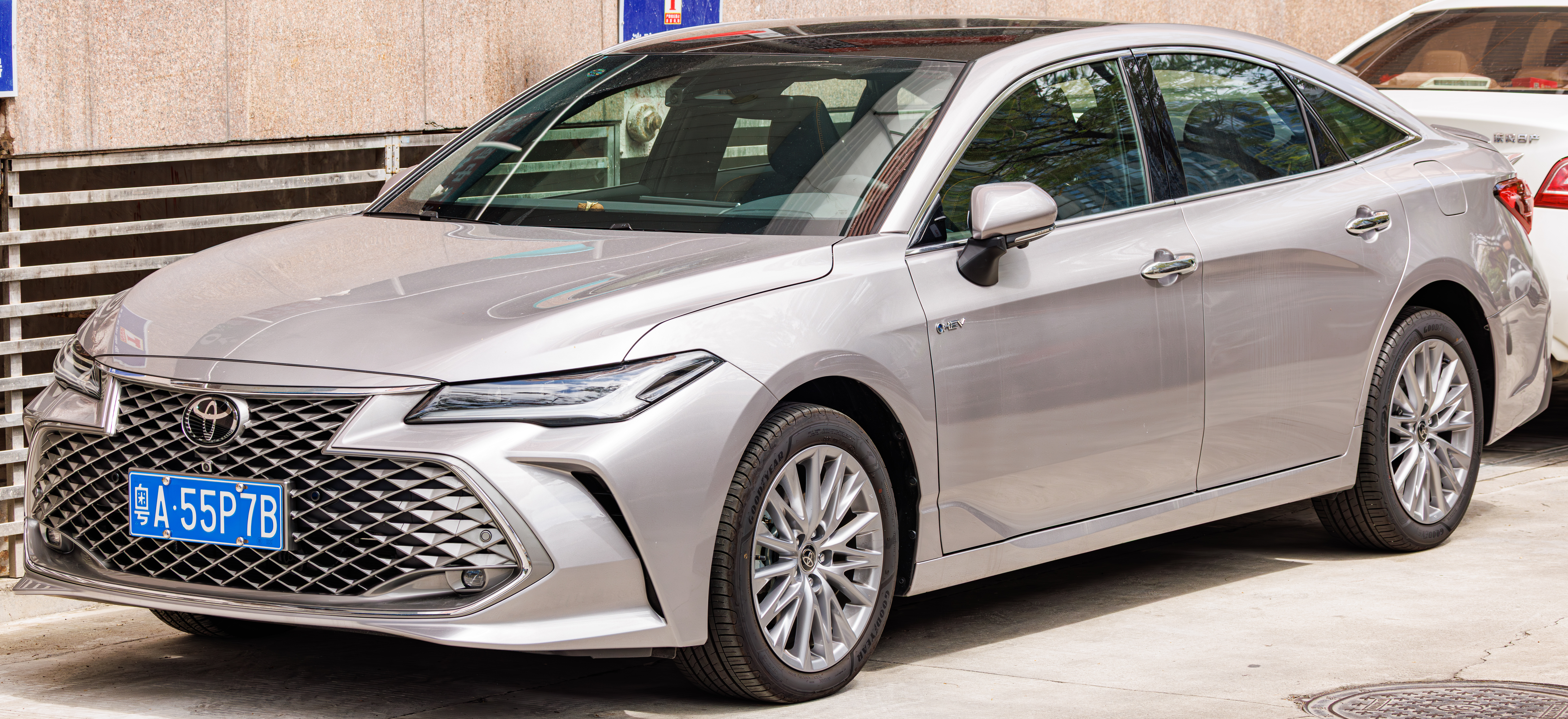
2024 Toyota Avalon Hybrid (AXXH50; 2024 facelift, China)

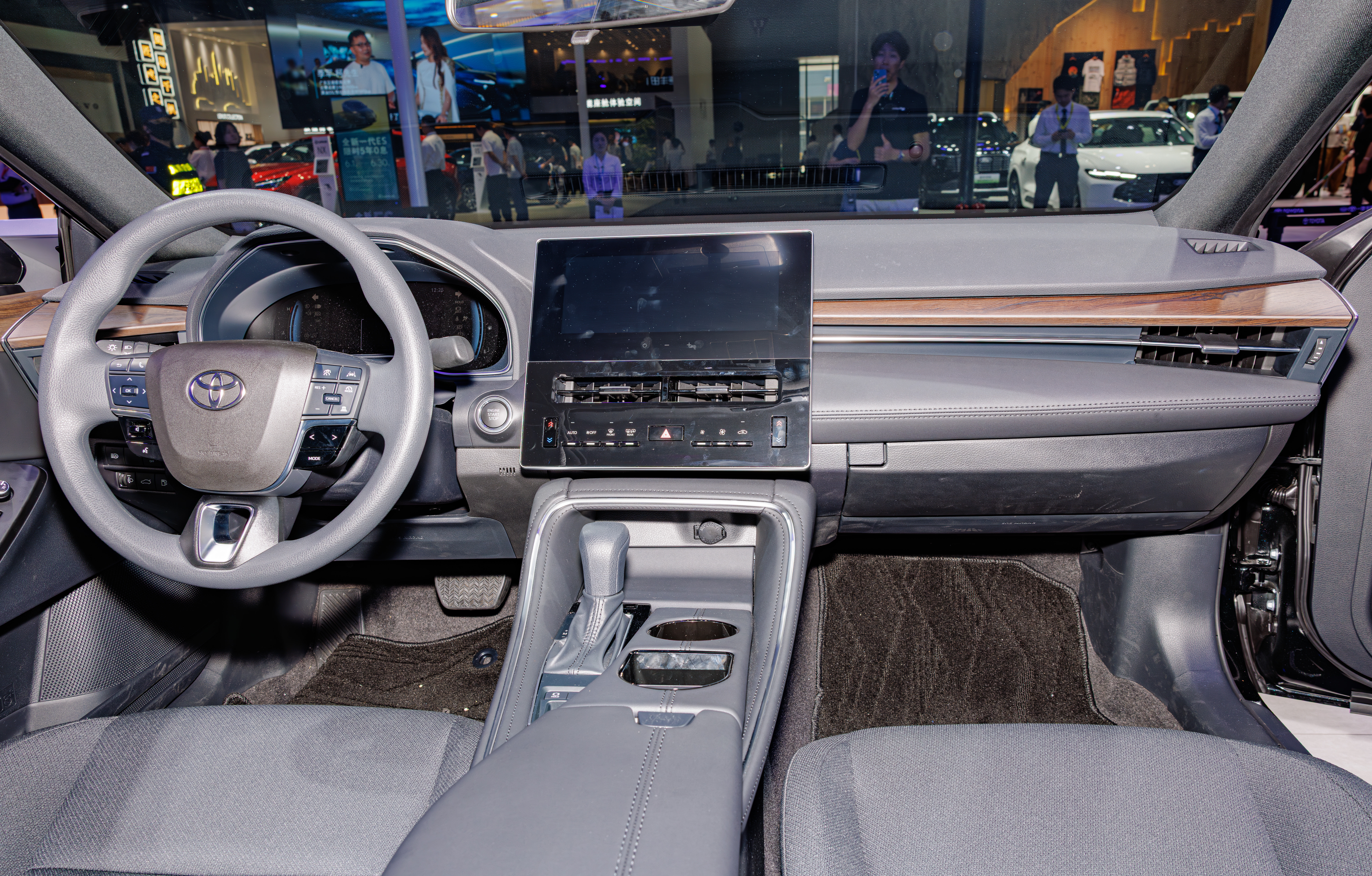
Interior (2024 facelift, China)

==== Third facelift (2026) ====
The third facelifted Avalon for the Chinese market was first revealed on 10 July 2026, and went on sale on 5 November 2026.

The exterior design was shown in China's MIIT filings, showing a redesigned front end making use of the hammerhead design similar to the sixteenth-generation Crown sedan, as well as a redesigned taillight assembly. Additionally, it features a grille with vertical slats and the overall body length has been extended by 65 mm (2.6 in) from 4,990 mm (196.5 in) to 5,055 mm (199.0 in) while other dimensions including wheelbase remain unchanged.

The dashboard receives a major redesign, now featuring a 8.8-inch digital instrument cluster without cowl, either a 10.25-inch or optional 15.6-inch 2.5K-resolution central infotainment display, and restyled dashboard and center console. It also now has a 50-watt wireless charging pad and 60-watt USB-C charging port. The front seats now have an optional leg support adjustment and massage function, the rear seats have optional heating and ventilation functions, and a new 14-speaker sound system is available.

The powertrain options remain unchanged but have updated fuel economy ratings.

=== Safety ===
It is equipped with Toyota Safety Sense P (TSS-P). The IIHS awarded a Top Safety Pick+ honor to the Avalon, with a "Good" rating in all categories except the passenger-side small overlap test, where it received an "Acceptable" rating. However, Avalons built after September 2018 get a “Good” rating in the passenger-side small overlap test.

In 2021, for the 2022 model year, this was upgraded to the Toyota Safety Sense 2.5+ (TSS-2.5+).

IIHS crash test ratings for 2019 Toyota Avalon
Small overlap front (Driver)	Good
Small overlap front (Passenger)	Good
Moderate overlap front	Good
Side (original test)	Good
Roof strength	Good
Head restraints and seats	Good
Headlights (varies by trim/option)	Good / Poor
Front crash prevention (Vehicle-to-Vehicle)	Superior
Child seat anchors (LATCH) ease of use	Good+

== Sales ==
Year	United States	Canada	China	Australia
1994	6,559			
1995	66,123			
1996	73,070			
1997	71,081			
1998	77,576			
1999	67,851			
2000	104,078			8,788
2001	83,005			11,760
2002	69,029			8,588
2003	50,911			6,064
2004	36,460	187		5,584
2005	95,318	2,115		2,950
2006	88,938	1,408		
2007	72,945	1,010		
2008	42,790	380		
2009	26,935	280		
2010	28,390	502		
2011	28,925	496		
2012	29,556 (inc. 747 hybrids)	427		
2013	70,990 (inc. 16,468 hybrids)	1,264		
2014	67,183 (inc. 17,048 hybrids)	996		
2015	60,063 (inc. 11,956 hybrids)	765		
2016	48,080 (inc. 8,451 hybrids)	586		
2017	32,583 (inc. 4,990 hybrids)	444		
2018	33,580 (inc. 8,009 hybrids)	626		
2019	27,767 (inc. 6,552 hybrids)	405	62,329	
2020	18,421 (inc. 6,714 hybrids)	235	111,515	
2021	19,460 (inc. 9,734 hybrids)	167	117,188	
2022	12,215 (inc. 3,565 hybrids)	1	118,031	
2023			96,254	
2024			91,229	
2025			126,703	

== See also ==
- List of Toyota vehicles
