= Toyota Camry (XV40) =

Sixth generation of Toyota Camry

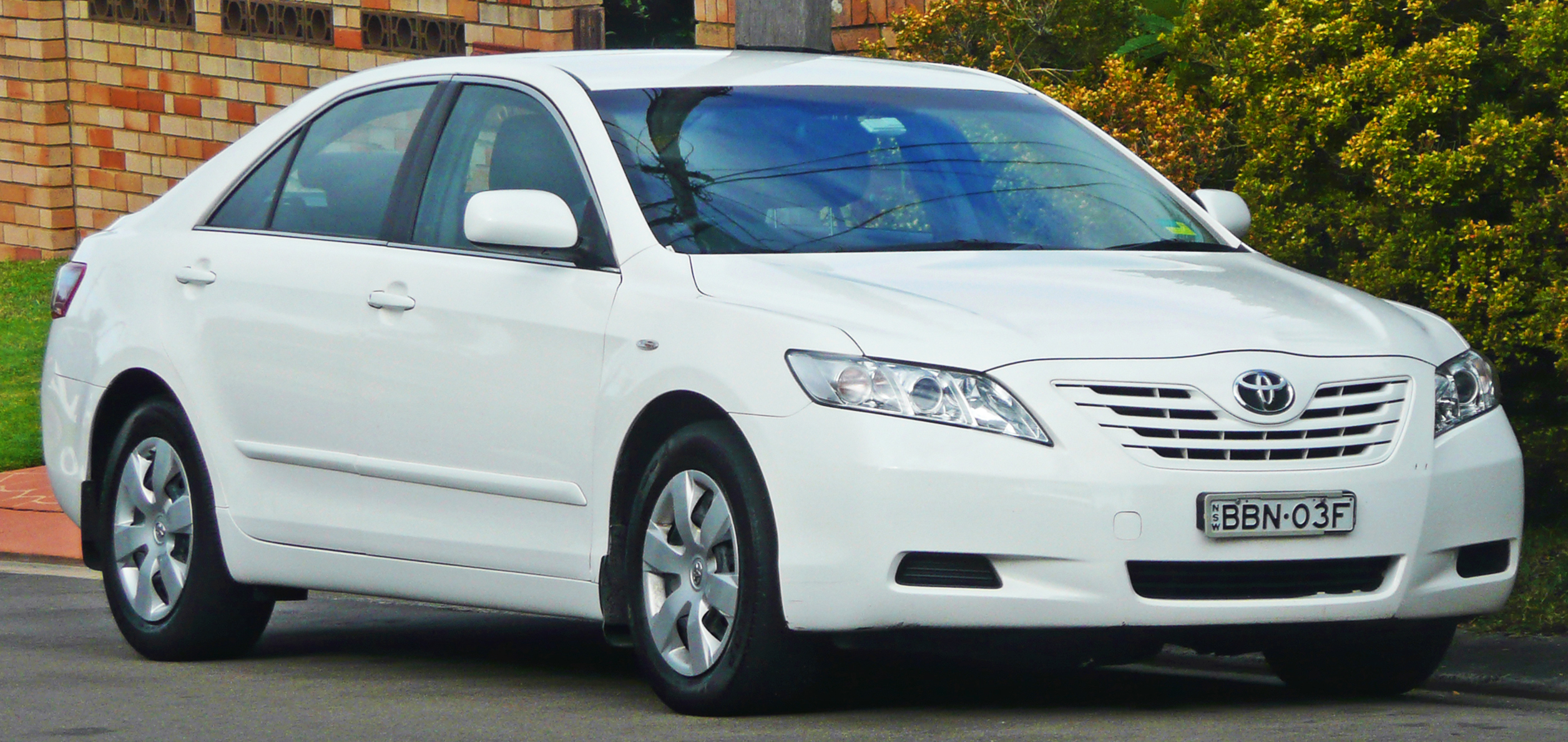
- Pre-facelift Toyota Camry Altise (ACV40R, Australia)

Overview
- Manufacturer: Toyota
- Also called: Daihatsu Altis (regular, Japan); Toyota Aurion (Prestige, Australia); Toyota Premium Limo (regular, taxi version, Indonesia)
- Production: January 2006 – August 2011 (Japan); February 2006 – August 2011 (US); June 2006 – October 2011 (Australia); December 2007 – October 2011 (Russia)
- Model years: 2007–2011
- Assembly: Japan: Toyota, Aichi (Tsutsumi plant); Australia: Altona, Victoria (TMCA); Russia: Saint Petersburg; United States: Georgetown, Kentucky (TMMK); Lafayette, Indiana (SIA)
- Designer: Hiroyuki Metsugi (2003); Takafumi Ito and Kazumi Kouwaki (2009 regular model facelift: 2007); Anthony Cheung and Nicolas Hogios (2009 Prestige model facelift)

Body and chassis
- Class: Mid-size car
- Body style: 4-door sedan
- Layout: Front-engine, front-wheel drive; Front-engine, four-wheel drive
- Platform: Toyota K platform
- Related: Lexus ES (XV40); Toyota Aurion (XV40); Toyota Avalon (XX30); Toyota Venza (AV10)

Powertrain
- Engine: Gasoline: 2.0 L 1AZ-FE VVT-i I4; 2.4 L 2AZ-FE VVT-i I4; 2.5 L 2AR-FE Dual VVT-i I4; 3.5 L 2GR-FE Dual VVT-i V6; Gasoline hybrid: 2.4 L 2AZ-FXE VVT-i I4
- Electric motor: 2x Permanent magnet Motor (Camry Hybrid)
- Transmission: 5/6-speed manual; 4/5/6-speed automatic; eCVT (hybrid)
- Hybrid drivetrain: Series-parallel (Hybrid Synergy Drive)
- Battery: 1.6 kWh Panasonic High voltage NiMH

Dimensions
- Wheelbase: 2,776 mm (109.3 in)
- Length: 4,805 mm (189.2 in)
- Width: 1,820 mm (71.7 in)
- Height: 1,470 mm (57.9 in)

Chronology
- Predecessor: Toyota Camry (XV30)
- Successor: Toyota Camry (XV50)

The Toyota Camry (XV40) is a mid-size car produced by Toyota from January 2006 to October 2011. Replacing the XV30 series, the XV40 represented the sixth generation of the Toyota Camry in all markets outside Japan, which followed a different generational lineage. Between 2006 and 2010, a badge engineered model called Daihatsu Altis sold alongside the Camry in Japan. Toyota replaced the XV40 series in 2011 with the XV50.

Introduced at the January 2006 North American International Auto Show, the XV40 made its North American sales debut in March 2006 as a 2007 model. For the first time, a gasoline/electric hybrid version of Camry was offered in addition to the naturally aspirated four- and six-cylinder engines.

Like the previous XV30 model, the XV40 was offered in two distinct forms. The Camry sold in Australasia and North America was the same as the version available in Japan; the version sold in China and the majority of Southeast Asia was based on the Australian-designed XV40 Aurion. The Aurion was essentially the same as the regular Camry, albeit, with revised front- and rear-end styling, and minor alterations to the interior.

== Design ==
Like the previous XV30, the design of the XV40 series Toyota Camry was split into two separate configurations: "regular" and "prestige". The "regular Camry" is sold in Australasia, Hong Kong, India, Japan, the Middle East, North America and Russia. However, the "prestige Camry" is an Australian-designed model sold alongside the "regular Camry" in Australasia and the Middle East as the Aurion. China and most Southeast Asian countries also receive the Aurion, although it is badged "Toyota Camry" as the regular car is not offered in those markets.

=== Regular Camry ===
Making its debut at the January 2006 North American International Auto Show, the XV40 Camry takes a sleeker shape compared to its predecessor. The design is based on Toyota's "vibrant clarity" corporate design language, with a three-bar grille and stepped hood and trunk. The chief engineer for the XV40 was Kenichiro Fuse. Development began in early 2002 under the chief engineer Kenichiro Fuse. A final design was set in September 2003 and frozen in August 2004, 17 months ahead of production. Design patents were filed on 27 December 2005 at the United States Patent and Trademark Office.

The XV40 was redesigned to incorporate a 55-millimeter (2 in) longer wheelbase, wider wheel tracks and a stiffer body. Although overall length is equal to its predecessor, Toyota maximized interior volume—especially fore-and-aft space. This was achieved by moving the base of the windshield and rear glass outwards and by the redesigning of the front seats. At 535 liters (19 cu ft), cargo space has been reduced by 32 liters (1 cu ft) over the previous model. The SE/Sportivo provides 504 liters (18 cu ft) due to the placement of bracing behind the rear seat, with the hybrid version falling to 389 liters (14 cu ft) due to the placement of the battery pack. The XV40's underbody is stepped, creating a Venturi effect and hence a low-pressure area under the front end to increase downforce. Other aerodynamic design features include a stepped engine undercover and rear wheel fairings to channel airflow around the tires. The coefficient of drag figure remains at 0.28, falling to 0.27 for the hybrid version (which makes it the most aerodynamic car built in Australia).

The sports-oriented model, known as the "SE" in North America and "Sportivo" in Australasia, was developed by Toyota Australia. It features a black "honeycomb" grille, black-tinted head and fog lamps, rear lip spoiler, body kit appendages, and a lower ride height coupled with wider and larger 17-inch diameter wheels. To increase rear-end downforce, the SE/Sportivo includes additional rear floor and fuel tank undercovers. Handling-specific upgrades see the use of firmer shock absorbers, a rise in spring rate, thicker anti-roll bars, additional floor and body side bracing, and a "V"-brace behind the rear seat (which prevents the rear seat from folding down, offering a ski-pass only). Interior changes include charcoal-colored sports fabric and a leather-wrapped three-spoke steering wheel. In addition to the sports-oriented suspension setup, Toyota Australia's standard-grade suspension calibration has also been adopted by New Zealand, the Middle East and North America. The suspension geometry consists of independent MacPherson struts, L-arms, coil springs, gas dampers and a ball-jointed stabilizer bar at the front, with the rear setup comprising dual-link independent MacPherson struts with coil springs, gas dampers and ball-jointed stabilizer bar.

Toyota introduced a refreshed "regular" Camry XV40 design in January 2009 at the North American International Auto Show. Visual changes include an updated front fascia, including grille and bumper with larger air intakes, larger projector headlamps, redesigned tail lamp lenses incorporating LEDs on all models (previously hybrids only) and revised wheel trims among other design changes. The interior received revised trim, improved power window switches and a revamped audio system. The audio system now supports satellite radio (in North America) and added USB connectivity, with the dashboard-mounted screen now integrating a backup camera for models fitted with satellite navigation.

=== Prestige Camry (Aurion) ===
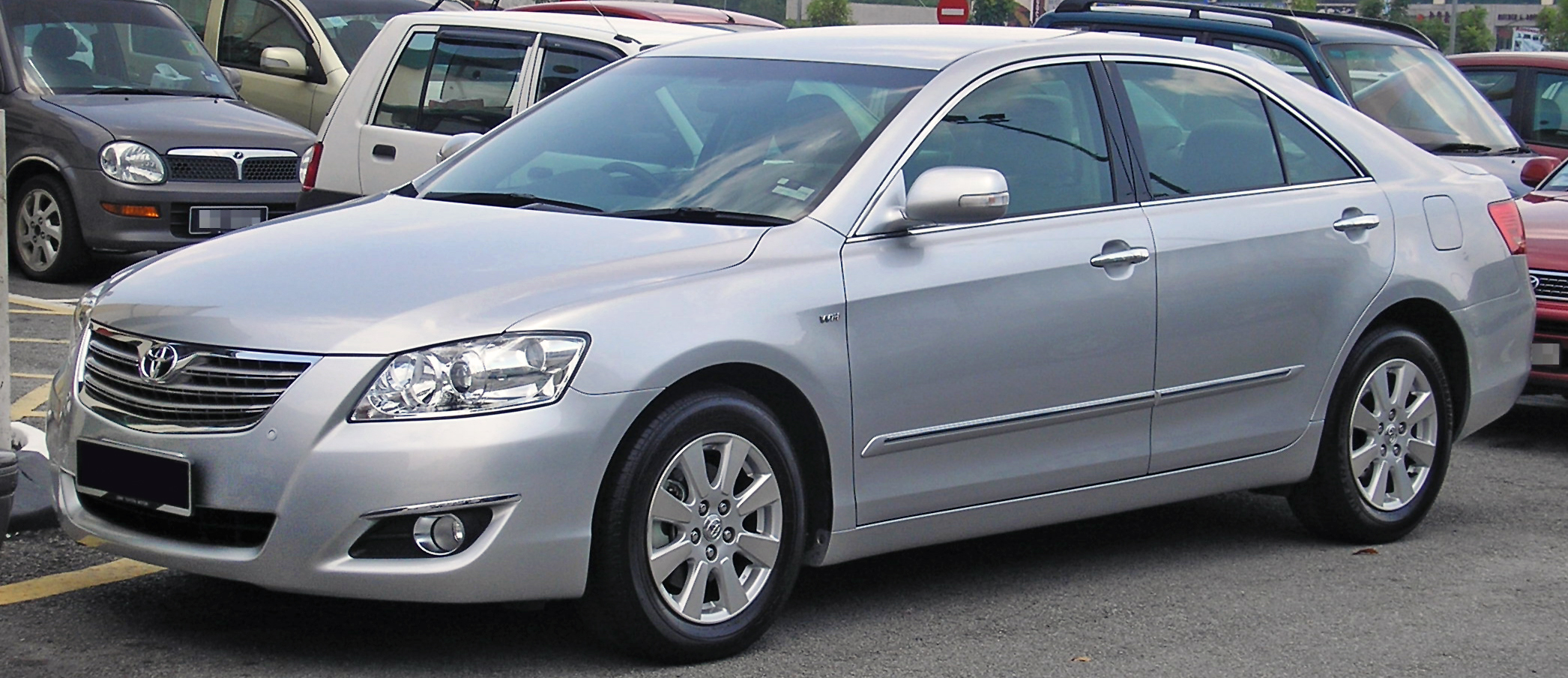
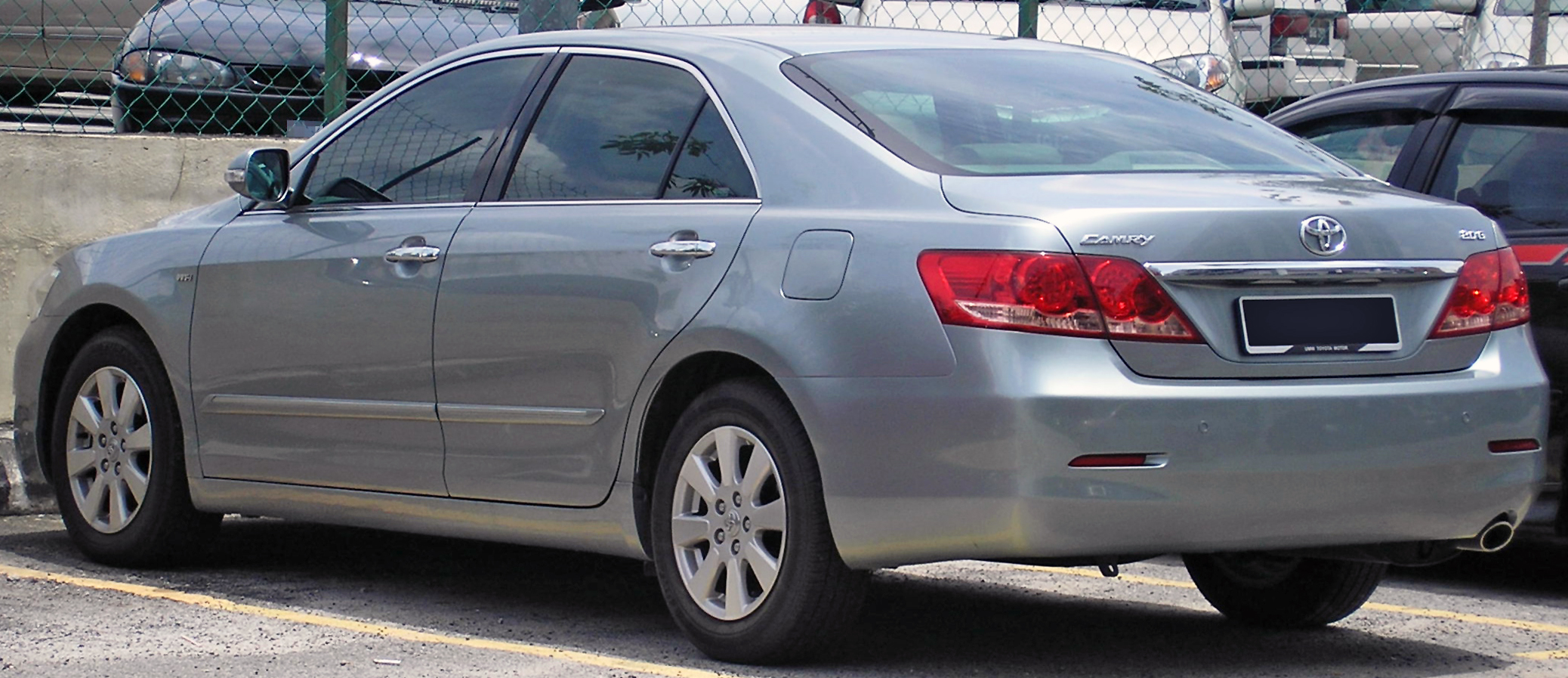
Pre-facelift Toyota Camry (Malaysia)
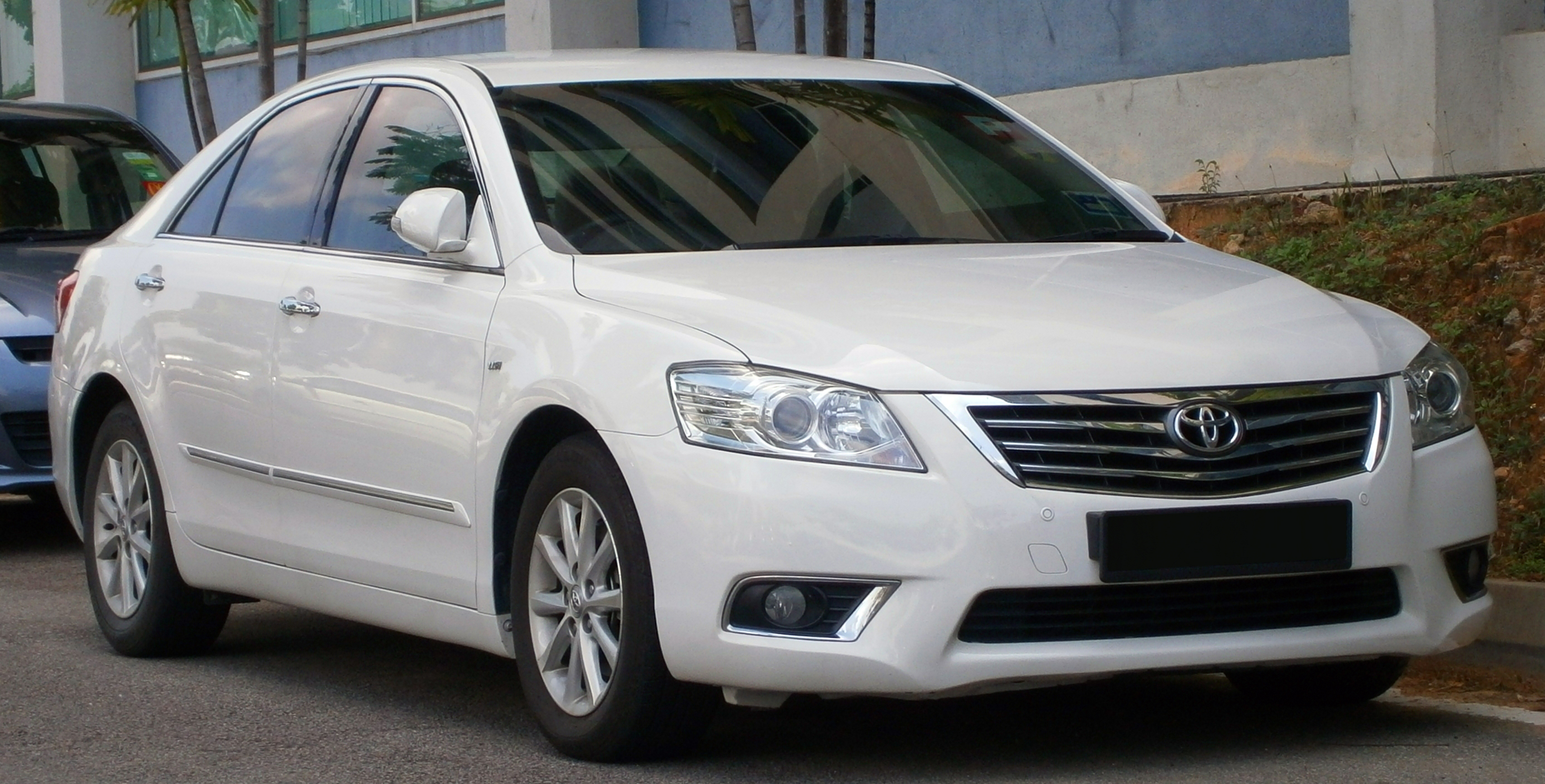
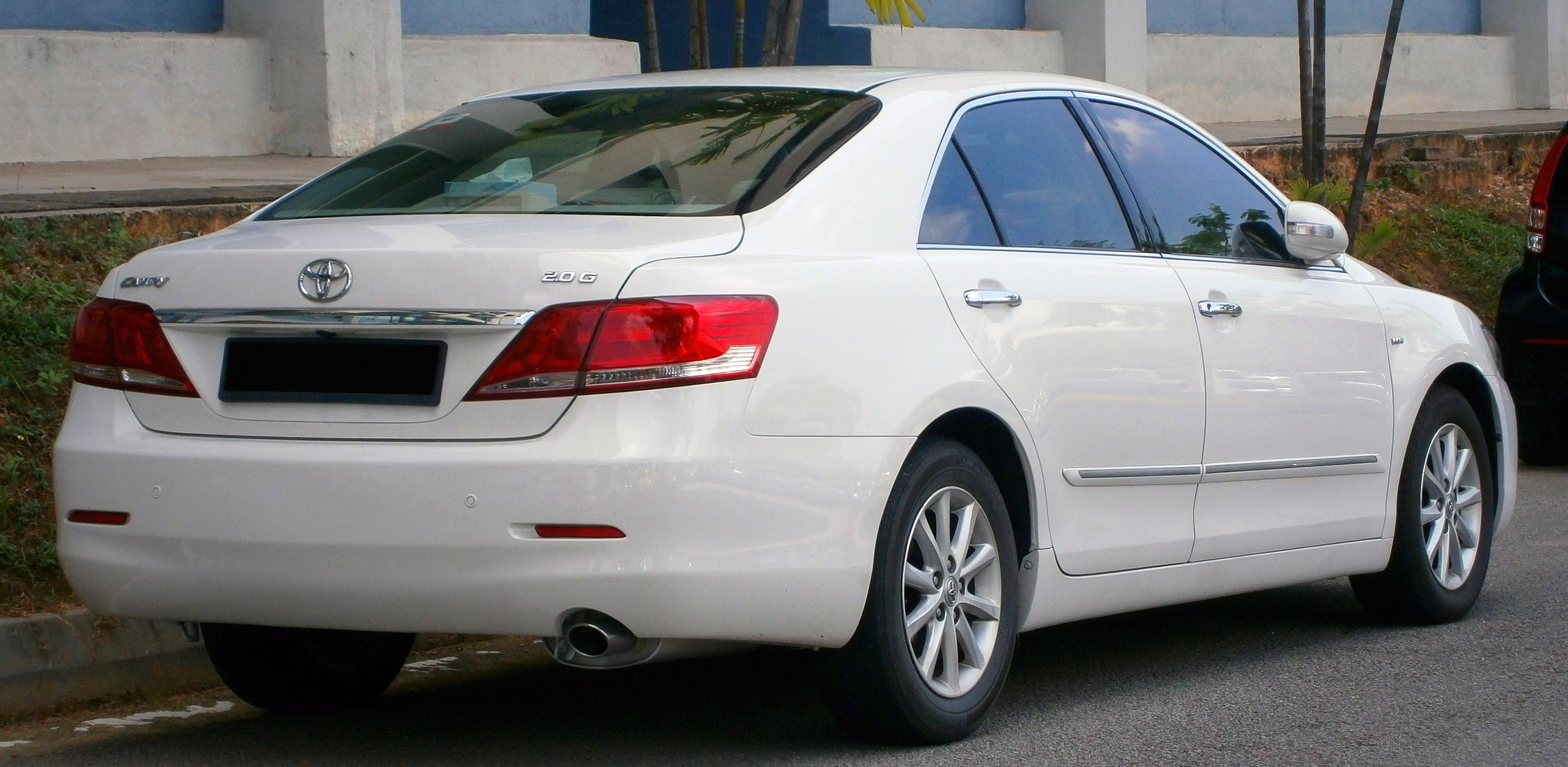
Facelift Toyota Camry (Malaysia)

The Camry sold in the majority of Southeast Asia, China and Taiwan is referred to as the "prestige Camry" by Toyota officials in Japan. The prestige Camry is a rebadged XV40 Aurion, a regional product designed in Australia and based on the regular Camry. Although front and rear fascias are unique to the Aurion, the body sides including doors and rear quarters, the greenhouse and roof are interchangeable with the regular Camry. This component sharing also means that Aurion has the same wheelbase, axle tracks and interior dimensions. From the inside, the Aurion also shares a common interior design with the Camry, including an almost identical lower dashboard, but gaining a redesigned upper dash portion and revamped center console. In the Middle East, the Aurion shares its dashboard with the regular Camry.

Like the Camry, the Aurion was designed with Toyota's "vibrant clarity" design language. However, the Aurion also integrates a "vibrant clarity" theory known as "perfect imbalance" that involves body features that act as a counterpoint to other body features. Examples of this include intersecting concave and convex surfaces and vertical sculpted features on the front fascia, which are balanced by the horizontal headlamps. The front-end's "double concave architecture" can also be characterized by its protruding hood crease line and deep grille. The same architecture is applied at the rear, with a deep bumper, a clamshell-shaped trunk lid that envelops over the flanks, dual exhaust pipes and tail lamps.

== Hybrid ==
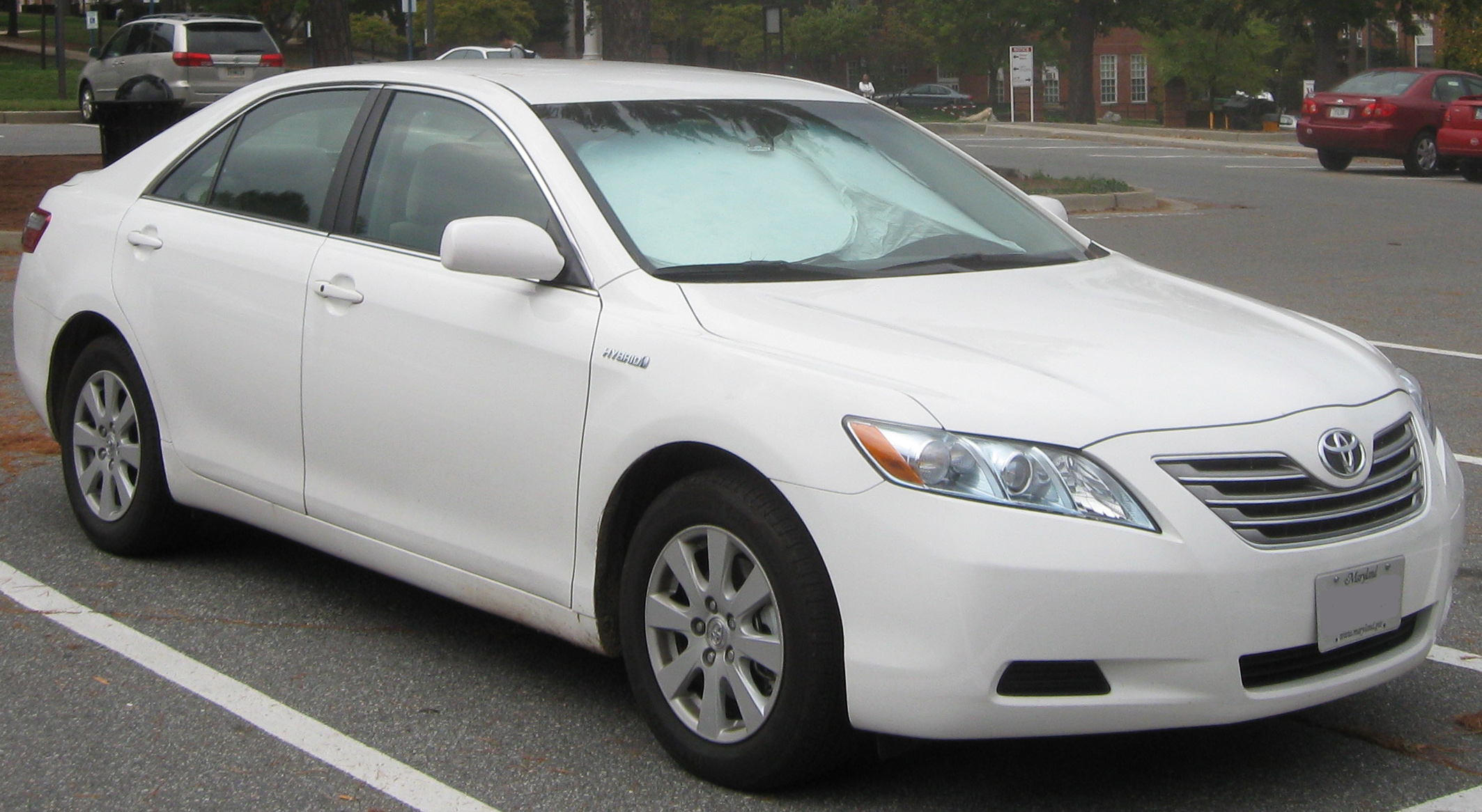
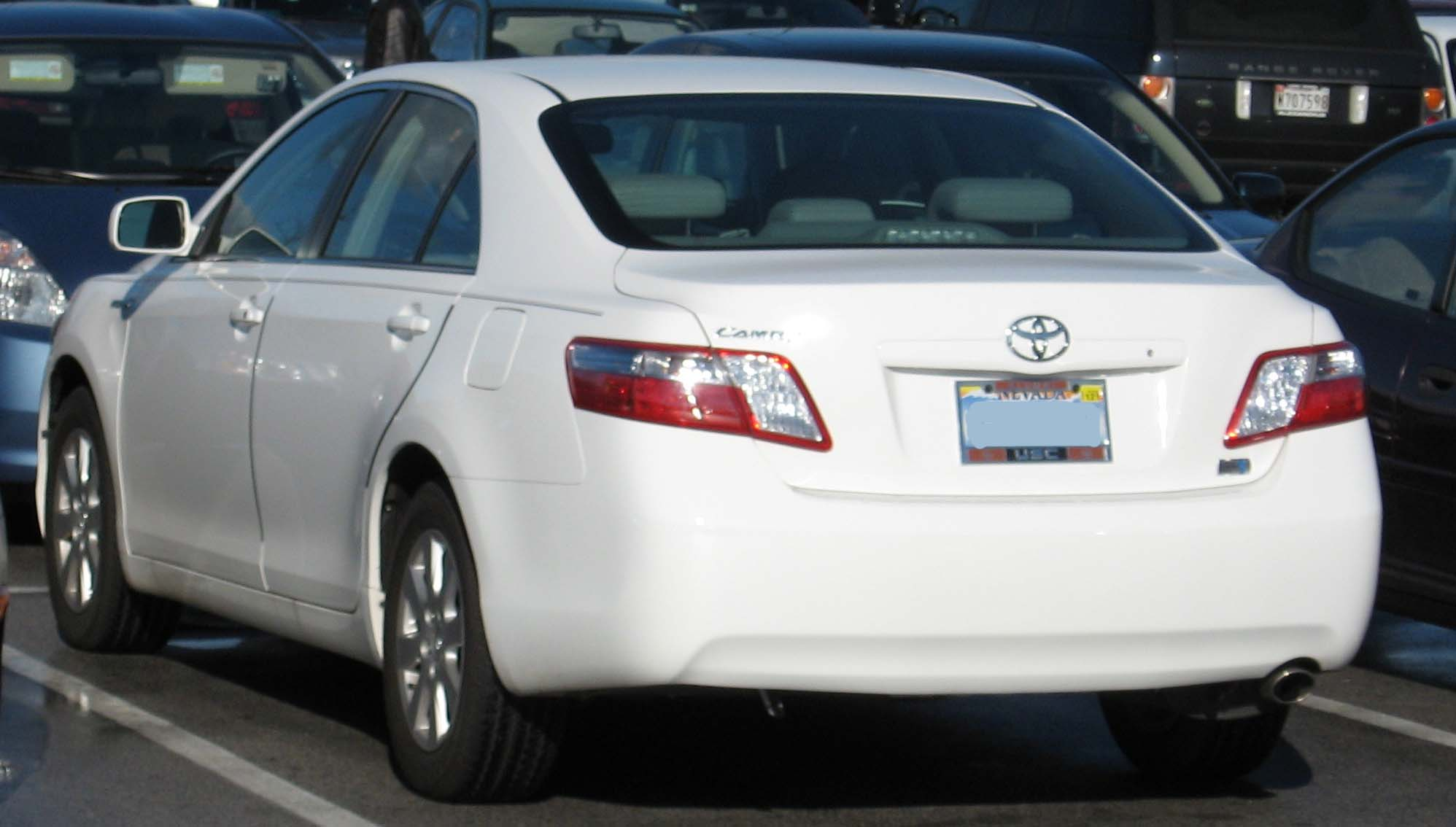
Toyota Camry Hybrid (US; pre-facelift) (Note: The pre-facelift Camry Hybrid was sold only in North America. However, the facelifted one, pictured below, was sold in international markets.)

The XV40 was the first Camry series available with a gasoline/electric hybrid drivetrain (see: below). Known as the "Toyota Camry Hybrid", the gasoline–electric model premiered in January 2006, alongside the non-hybrid car. Camry Hybrids were initially built solely at the Tsutsumi plant in Toyota, Aichi, Japan, although the hybrid has never been available for purchase in its home market. Since October 2006, models for the North American market shifted production to Toyota Motor Manufacturing Kentucky in the United States. Toyota Australia began local manufacture of the hybrid on 11 December 2009 at its Altona, Victoria plant. In Australasia, the car is known as the "Toyota Hybrid Camry", as opposed to "Camry Hybrid". Since May 2009, the hybrid model has also been produced at Toyota Motor Thailand's Gateway plant in Chachoengsao. Unlike the Camry Hybrid models produced elsewhere, the Thai models are based on the "prestige Camry" design. As of August 2009, worldwide sales of the Camry Hybrid represent 8.3 percent of Toyota's total hybrid sales, ranking second after the Toyota Prius, with more than 167,000 Camry Hybrids sold. As of December 2009, cumulative sales of the Camry Hybrid had reached 154,977 units in the US, placing it as the third best selling electric hybrid car in that market.

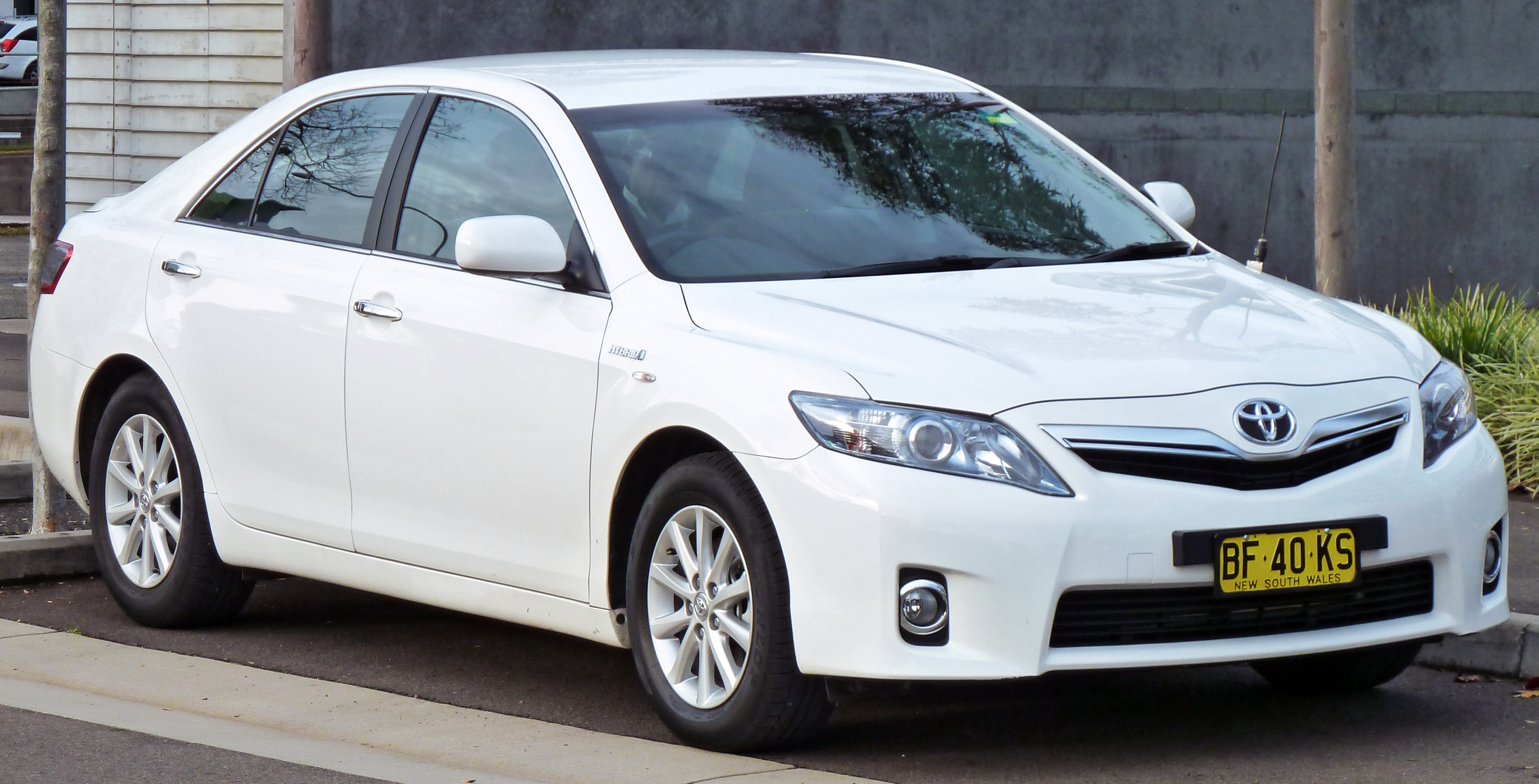
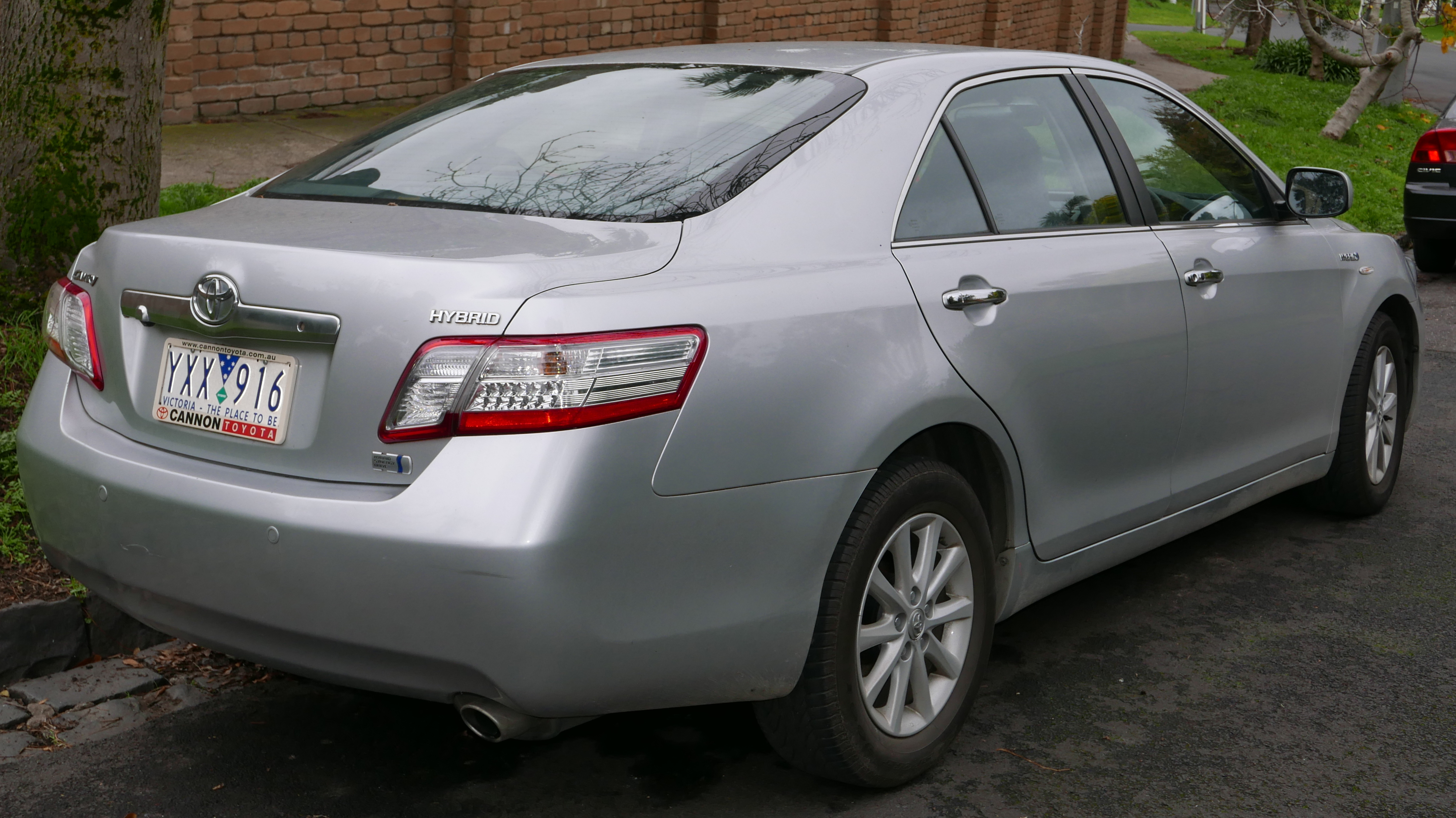
Toyota Hybrid Camry (Australia; facelift)

Compared to the gasoline-only variants, several features are unique to the hybrid. In addition to the hybrid powertrain, the Camry Hybrid employs electric power steering, brakes, and air conditioning that are fully operational once the internal combustion engine is deactivated. The car can run in an all-electric mode, gasoline-only or both. A real-time dashboard screen shows power distribution and the operation of the hybrid system and the tachometer is replaced by an analog fuel economy readout. The hybrid drivetrain has also necessitated a redesigned front subframe, along with remodeled rear and center floor pressings. This was required to accommodate the battery pack, which is stowed in the trunk. Other differences include wheel spats and underbody pans which reduce aerodynamic drag from 0.28 to 0.27 c_{d}, an "Eco" operating mode for the HVAC system that reduces the output of air conditioning to assist fuel economy, and Vehicle Dynamics Integrated Management (VDIM). Cosmetic changes are limited to redesigned tail lights with LEDs, a chrome-lined grille, as opposed to the color-coded version on every other Camry trim, and hybrid-oriented emblems including "Hybrid" badging on the front fenders and a decklid-mounted "Hybrid Synergy Drive" logo.

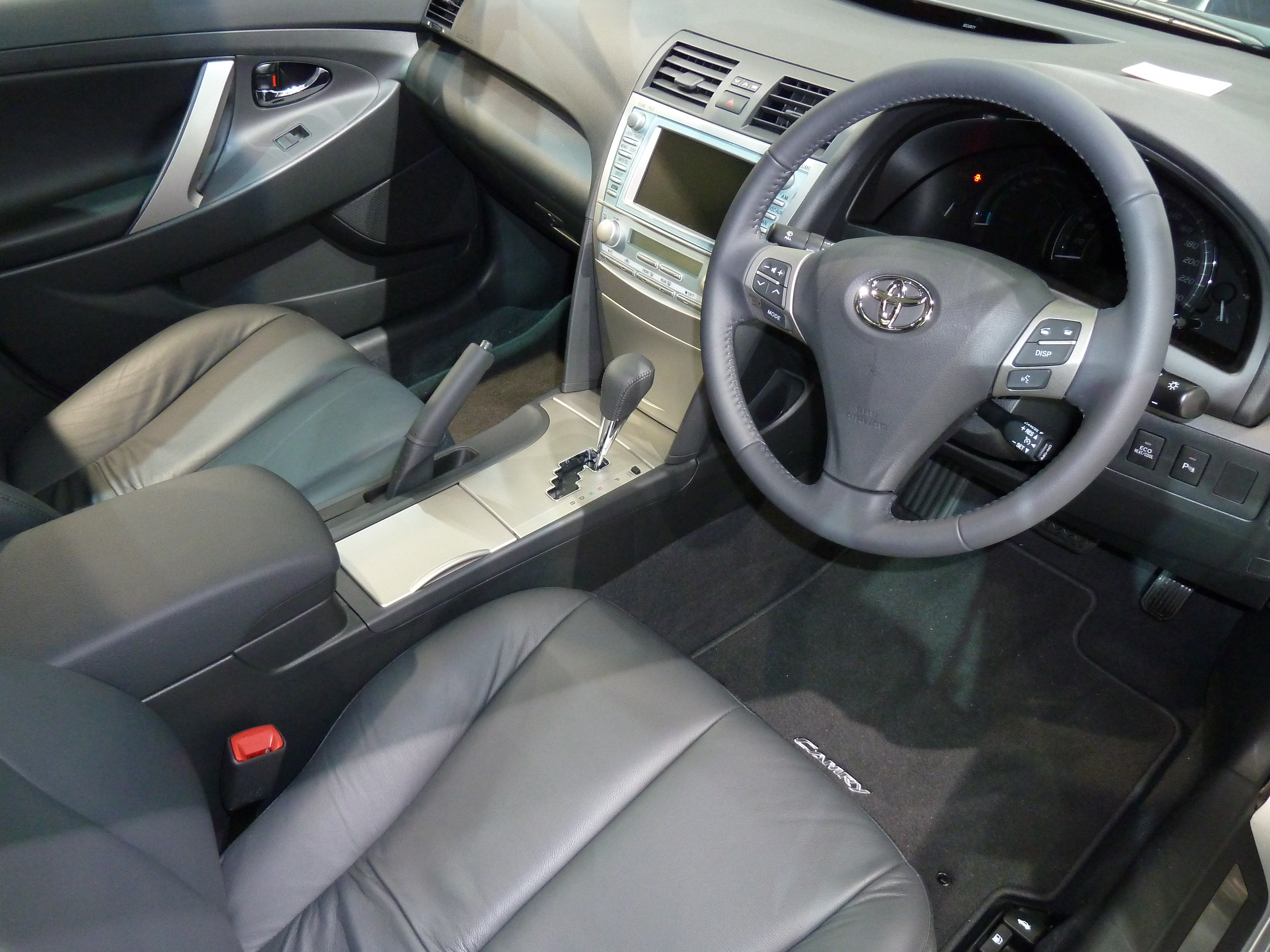
Interior (facelift)

For the facelifted version that debuted at the January 2009 North American International Auto Show, Toyota worked to better differentiate the styling of the hybrid away from the rest of the Camry range. This was achieved by fitting a distinct front fascia with a large, central air dam, vertically slotted fog lamps, and a single-blade grille. From the rear, the tail lamps abstain from the primarily red lens inserts fitted previously, to predominantly clear lenses, while the interior receives a newly designed fuel economy gauge. The design registrations for the facelifted Camry Hybrid, noting changes made to the original were filed on 19 December 2008 at the US Patent and Trademark Office.

== Powertrain ==
Powertrain options for the Camry XV40 comprised both four- and six-cylinder engines with manual and automatic transmissions. The entry-level engine was a 2.4-liter 2AZ-FE four-cylinder in front-wheel drive configuration available with manual and automatic transmissions, both five-speed units. For the Japanese market only, an all-wheel drive variant of the 2.4-liter engine was available, although a four-speed automatic was the sole transmission fitted. All other XV40 series Camrys use front-wheel drive. XV40s produced in the United States from January 2009 saw the 2.4-liter 2AZ-FE powerplant replaced by the 2.5-liter 2AR-FE engine and with it bringing new six-speed manual and automatic transmissions. In some markets, the top-level powertrain combination was a 3.5-liter 2GR-FE V6 engine paired exclusively to a six-speed automatic.

Toyota also offered a hybrid electric version of the 2.4-liter engine, designated 2AZ-FXE that employs the Atkinson cycle to maximize fuel economy. The hybrid uses Toyota's Hybrid Synergy Drive (HSD) system and makes use of Toyota's electronic continuously variable transmission (e-CVT)—a mechanism similar in function to a regular CVT. The gasoline engine produces 110 kilowatts (148 hp) and 187 newton-metres (138 lb⋅ft) of torque, with the 650-volt electric motor providing 105 kilowatts (141 hp) and 270 newton-metres (199 lb⋅ft). Working in conjunction, both powerplants produce a total combined output of 140 kilowatts (188 hp), however, due to the intricacy of quantifying a combined torque figure, Toyota has not provided one. The battery pack used by the hybrid version is a trunk-mounted nickel-metal hydride unit, weighing in at about 70 kilograms (154 lb). Approximately 135 kilograms (298 lb) of hybrid hardware is fitted to the car in total. However, Toyota claims this is negated by the increased output courtesy of the electric motor that improves acceleration by an estimated 15 percent over the non-hybrid 2.4-liter, five-speed automatic variant. At the November 2008 LA Auto Show, Toyota unveiled a concept compressed natural gas (CNG)-powered hybrid electric version.

Chassis	Model	Drive	Engine	Power	Torque	Transmission
XV40	ACV40	FWD	2.4 L 2AZ-FE inline-four (gasoline)	117 kW (157 hp) (AU); 118 kW (158 hp) (NA); 123 kW (165 hp) (JP)	218 N⋅m (161 lb⋅ft) (AU/NA); 224 N⋅m (165 lb⋅ft) (JP)	5-speed E351 manual 5-speed U250E automatic
XV40	ACV45	AWD	2.4 L 2AZ-FE inline-four (gasoline)	117 kW (157 hp) (AU); 118 kW (158 hp) (NA); 123 kW (165 hp) (JP)	218 N⋅m (161 lb⋅ft) (AU/NA); 224 N⋅m (165 lb⋅ft) (JP)	4-speed U241E automatic
XV40	AHV40	FWD	2.4 L 2AZ-FXE inline-four (hybrid gasoline)	140 kW (188 hp) (AU); 139 kW (187 hp) (NA)	See text	eCVT P311 automatic
XV40	ASV40	FWD	2.5 L 2AR-FE inline-four (gasoline)	126 kW (169 hp)	226 N⋅m (167 lb⋅ft)	6-speed EB62 manual 6-speed U760E automatic
XV40	ASV40	FWD	2.5 L 2AR-FE inline-four (gasoline)	133 kW (178 hp)	232 N⋅m (171 lb⋅ft)	6-speed EB62 manual 6-speed U760E automatic
XV40	GSV40	FWD	3.5 L 2GR-FE V6 (gasoline)	200 kW (268 hp)	336 N⋅m (248 lb⋅ft)	6-speed U660E automatic

== Safety ==
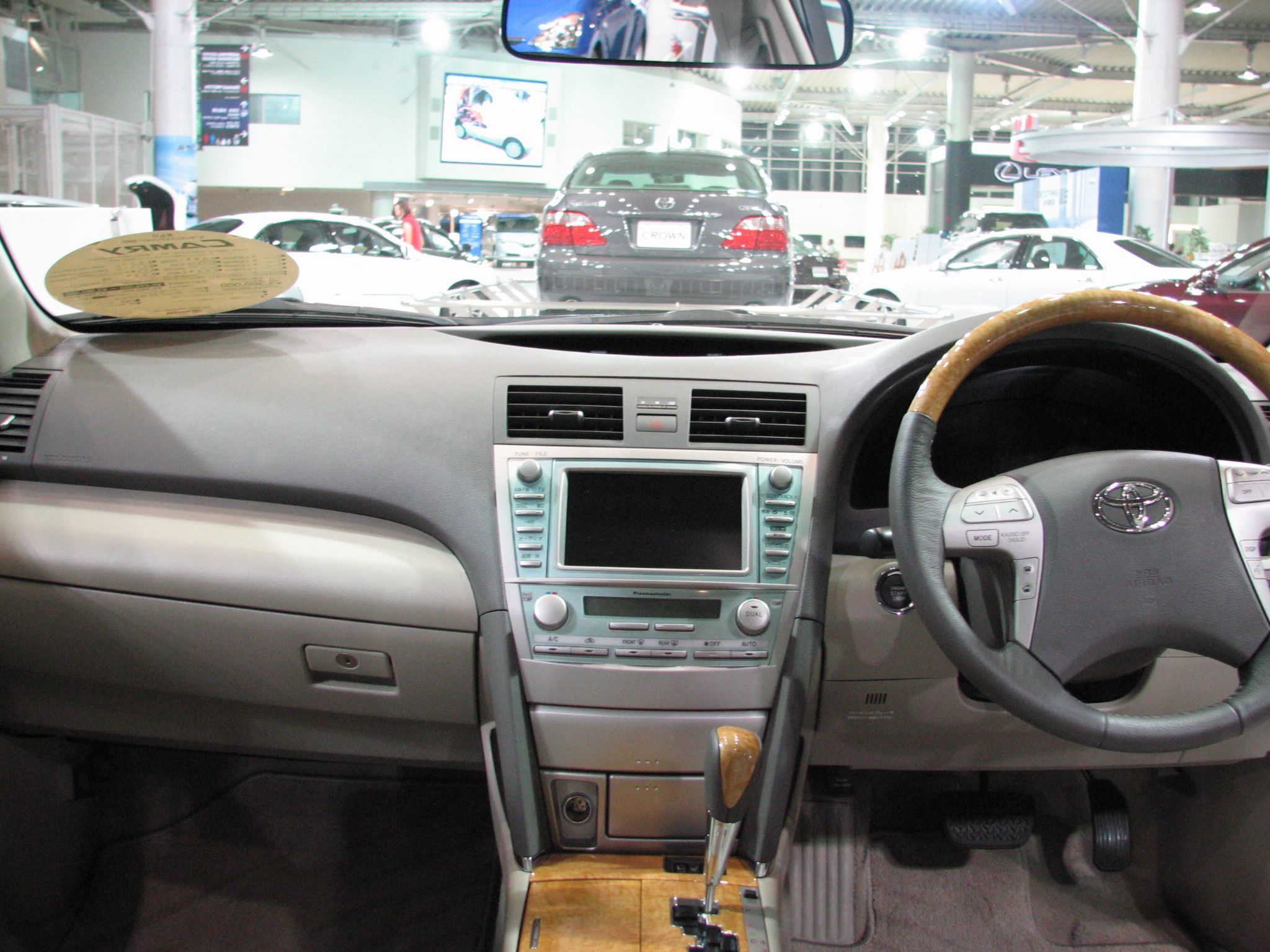

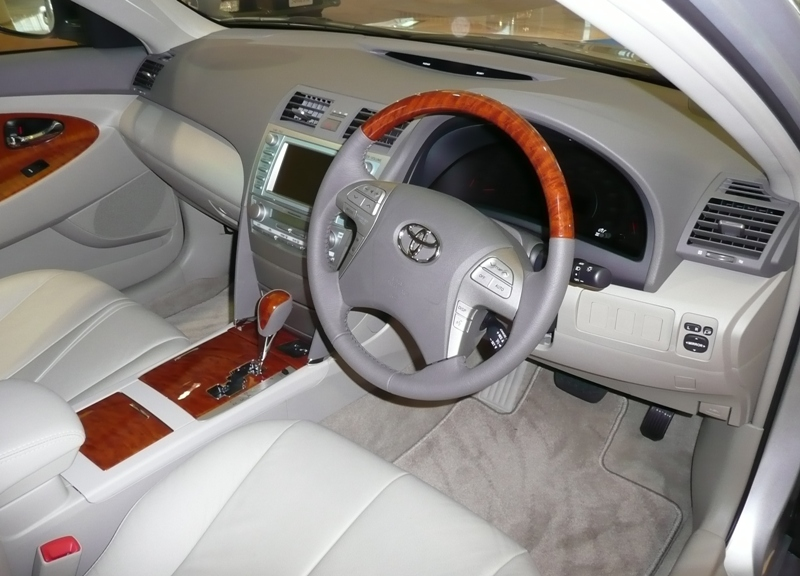
Interiors of the Toyota Camry G Dignis Edition (Japan; pre-facelift). Red-brown interior wood grain replaced the yellow-tinged trim after July 2007.

Toyota improved the Camry's safety by increasing the XV40's structural rigidity. This has been achieved through the application of ultra high-tensile steel, which is hot stamped to the Camry's roof, A- and B-pillars, and rocker panels. The structure of the front seat mounts were designed to transfer side collision impact loads across the car.

The Insurance Institute for Highway Safety (IIHS) awarded the Camry sedan an overall rating of "good" in both frontal offset and side impact crash tests. Both tests also receive the "good" rating in all 14 measured categories, and is also rated "good" in the roof strength test with a 5.31 strength-to-weight ratio withstanding a peak force of 7,978 kilograms (17,588 lb). The National Highway Traffic Safety Administration (NHTSA) originally rated the XV40 the full five-star rating for the frontal driver, frontal passenger, side driver, and side rear passenger tests, and a four-star rating for the rollover test. However, under the new NHTSA testing methodology introduced in 2010, the 2011 model year XV40 was downgraded to a three-star rating. This overall vehicle score was broken down into the frontal barrier crash rating of four-stars for the driver (male), and two-stars for the front passenger (female), giving an overall front-impact protection rating of three-stars. A side barrier rating of five-stars for the driver (male), and two-stars for the front passenger (female), gave for an overall side-impact protection rating of three-stars. The third testing component, the rollover rating, resulted in a grading of four-stars. Subsequently, the NHTSA tested a later release of the 2011 model year Camry with enhanced safety. This resulted in an increase to the side barrier rating from two- to four-stars for the front female passenger, thus increasing the Camry's overall score to four-stars.

Testing conducted by the Australasian New Car Assessment Program (ANCAP) resulted in the Camry XV40 receiving a four-star safety rating or a score of 27.53 out of 37. Dual frontal airbags were fitted to the model tested. ANCAP later tested the hybrid variant fitted with additional side and curtain airbags. The hybrid also scored four-stars, although did achieve a higher 28.22-point grading. Prompted by the five-star ANCAP safety rating mandate for all passenger cars purchased by the Australian federal government from 1 July 2011, Toyota Australia revised the XV40 specification including the fitment of a front passenger seatbelt reminder. This resulted in an upgraded five-star result for Australian models produced from May 2011. While the regular version scored 33.13 points, the hybrid rated marginally better at 33.22 out of 37. The offset crash yielded 14.29 out of 16, with 14.84 out of 16 for the side impact crash test. An additional two points came from completing the pole test, while the seatbelt reminders yielded the qualifying two points required for the five-star result. The hybrid fared identically except in the offset crash test where it gained 0.08 points then picking up 0.01 in the side impact crash. Both cars also scored a "marginal" pedestrian protection rating at 14.5 out of 36. The 2010 edition of Monash University's Used Car Safety Ratings, found that the XV40 provides an "excellent" (five out of five stars) level of occupant safety protection in the event of an accident.

ANCAP test results* Toyota Camry Ateva 4 door sedan (2007)
Test	Score
Overall	4 /5 stars
Frontal offset	12.29/16
Side impact	14.84/16
Pole	Not Assessed
Seat belt reminders	1/3
Whiplash protection	Not Assessed
Pedestrian protection	Marginal
Electronic stability control	Standard

ANCAP test results* Toyota Camry Altise 4 door sedan (2007)
Test	Score
Overall	4 /5 stars
Frontal offset	12.29/16
Side impact	14.24/16
Pole	Not Assessed
Seat belt reminders	1/3
Whiplash protection	Not Assessed
Pedestrian protection	Marginal
Electronic stability control	Standard

ANCAP test results* Toyota Camry Hybrid variants (2010)
Test	Score
Overall	4 /5 stars
Frontal offset	12.37/16
Side impact	14.85/16
Pole	Not Assessed
Seat belt reminders	1/3
Whiplash protection	Not Assessed
Pedestrian protection	Pending
Electronic stability control	Standard

ANCAP test results* Toyota Camry all variants (2011)
Test	Score
Overall	5 /5 stars
Frontal offset	14.29/16
Side impact	14.84/16
Pole	2/2
Seat belt reminders	2/3
Whiplash protection	Marginal
Pedestrian protection	Marginal
Electronic stability control	Standard

=== Recalls ===
On 26 September 2007, Toyota recalled the optional "all-weather" heavy-duty rubber floor mats from 2007 and 2008 model year Toyota Camry XV40s sold in North America. Toyota issued a second recall on 2 November 2009 asking owners to remove the driver floor mat and not replace it with any other type of mat. Toyota extended its floor mat recall on 25 November to reconfigure the accelerator pedal, replace the all-weather floor mats, and install a brake override system to prevent sudden unintended acceleration. Toyota issued a fourth unwanted acceleration-related recall for the Camry on 21 January 2010, this time in response to reports of accelerator pedals sticking in models without floor mats. Evaluations by Car and Driver and Edmunds found that the Camry's brakes were powerful enough to overcome the accelerator in all tests, bringing the car safely to a stop.

== Markets ==
The XV40 Camrys were produced at the Tsutsumi Plant in Toyota, Aichi, Japan; the Toyota Motor Manufacturing Kentucky production site at Georgetown, Kentucky in the United States; Toyota Australia's facility in Altona, Victoria; and Shushary, Saint Petersburg, Russia from December 2007. On 20 April 2007, additional US Camry manufacturing began at Subaru of Indiana Automotive in Lafayette, Indiana. A Camry manufactured in Japan is denoted with a Vehicle Identification Number (VIN) starting with "J"; US-made models are denoted with a numeral.

=== Asia ===
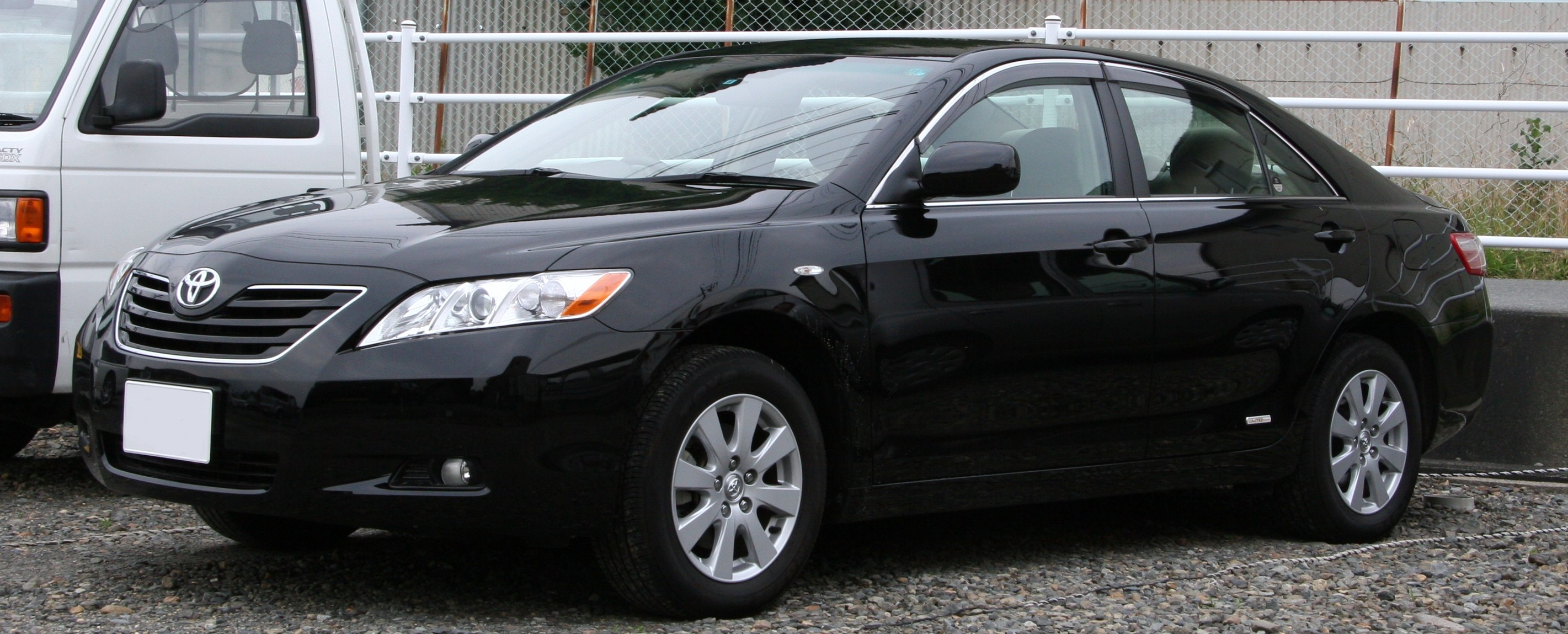
Toyota Camry G Limited Edition (Japan; pre-facelift)

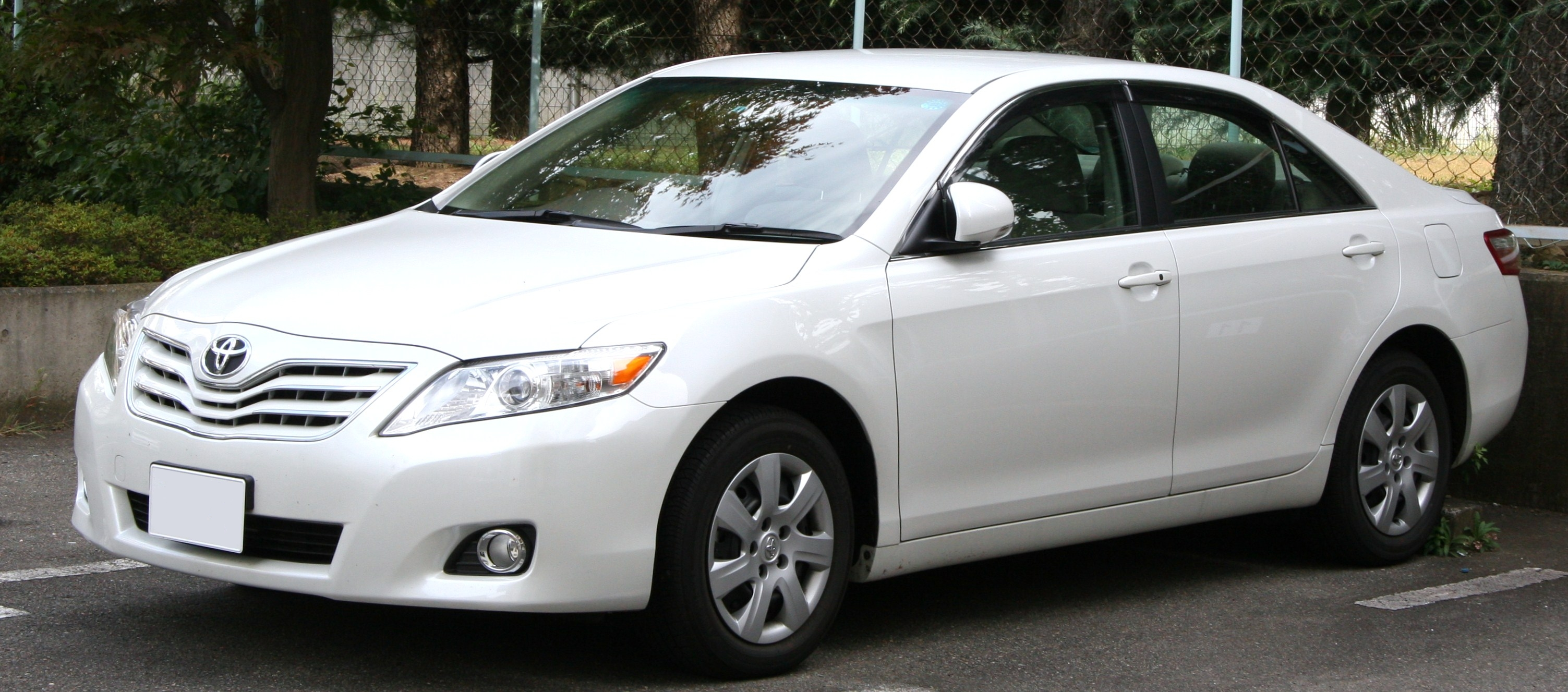
Toyota Camry G (Japan; facelift)

The Camry in Japan was released on 30 January 2006 with a sales target of 1,000 units per month. Two driveline combinations are offered—the 2.4-liter engine and five-speed automatic transmission in front-wheel drive (FWD) configuration—or the same engine paired with the four-speed automatic utilizing all-wheel drive (AWD).

Offered in three levels of luxury: "G", "G Limited Edition" and "G Dignis Edition", AWD is optional on the two base trims ("G Four" and "G Four Limited Edition"). The base-line Camry "G" features 16-inch steel wheels, six airbags, keyless entry and start, "Optitron" gauges, speed-sensitive automatic door locks, a four-spoke leather-wrapped steering wheel and shift lever, a wood grain center console, dual-zone climate control air conditioning and an electric driver's seat (FWD only). The second level "G Limited Edition" gains 16-inch alloy wheels and cruise control, while the top-level "G Dignis Edition" features a metallic-finished grille insert, Vehicle Stability Control (VSC), rain-sensing windscreen wipers, wood grain inserts for the steering wheel and shift knob and a 7-inch (178 mm) widescreen touch LCD (incorporating satellite navigation, television, Bluetooth handsfree support and G-BOOK telematics). Daihatsu continued with its Altis variant for the Japanese market, also introduced on 30 January 2006. Offered in "G Limited Edition" (FWD) and "G Four Limited Edition" (AWD) specification levels, the Altis roughly correlates with the Camry equivalents. Visually, the Altis is identical to the Japanese market Camry, with only the badging unique to the Daihatsu.

The wood grain interior trim of the Camry/Altis changed from yellow-brown to red-brown during a small update in July 2007, with VSC made standard fitment when the facelift version commenced sales on 13 January 2009. Toyota ceased manufacture of the Daihatsu-branded models in February 2010 due to low sales; just 447 units of the XV40 series Altis were registered in three years.

For the Indian market, the Camry is available in four levels of specification: "W1", "W2", "W3" and "W4". The base "W1" is fitted with the 2.4-liter gasoline engine and five-speed manual transmission. It is fitted with dual-zone climate control air conditioning, a six-CD changer, power front seats, rain-sensing wipers, six airbags and high-intensity discharge (HID) headlamps. Upgrades to the "W2" grade include: a five-speed automatic transmission, cruise control, rear HVAC vents and Vehicle Stability Control (VSC). The "W3" and "W4" versions are specified identically to the "W1" and "W2", respectively, other than for the addition of a sunroof. In the Middle East, the Camry range is sourced from Toyota Australia and is only available with the 2.4-liter engine, with the option of both manual and automatic transmissions. Three trim levels are offered: "GL", "GLX" and "SE". However, the "SE" trim would be replaced with "Touring" upon introduction of the facelift in 2009.

The Camry was officially retailed in South Korea in 2009 after Toyota launched their South Korean office.

=== Australasia ===
The Australian market version of the XV40 Camry made its media debut on 25 July 2006. Produced at the Toyota Australia plant in Altona, Victoria, Australian-manufactured XV40s were also exported to New Zealand and the Pacific Islands, although the majority of exports went to the Middle East. As of 2008, the Camry was the best selling Australian-produced vehicle, when taking into account all sales, both domestic and exports.

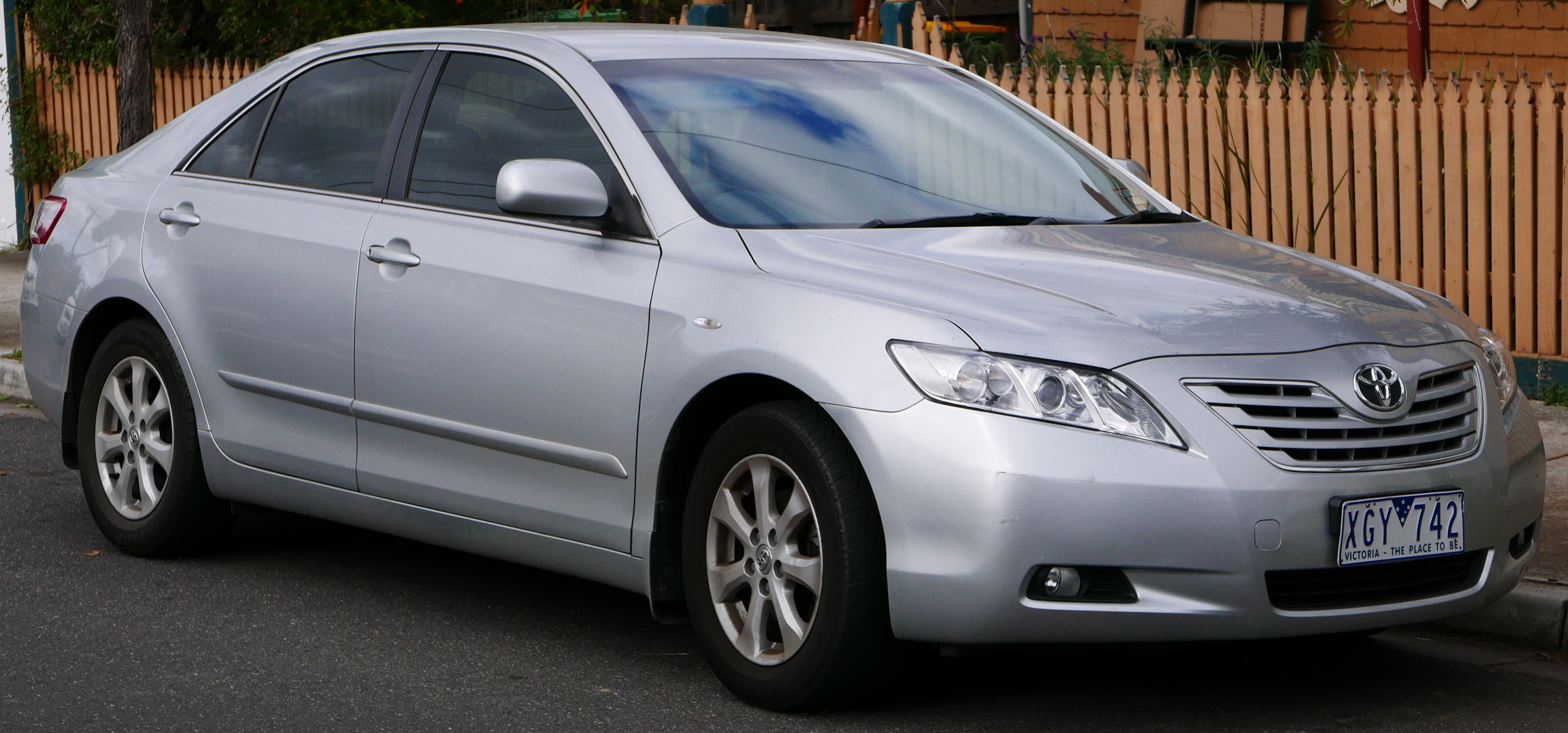
Toyota Camry Ateva (Australia; pre-facelift)

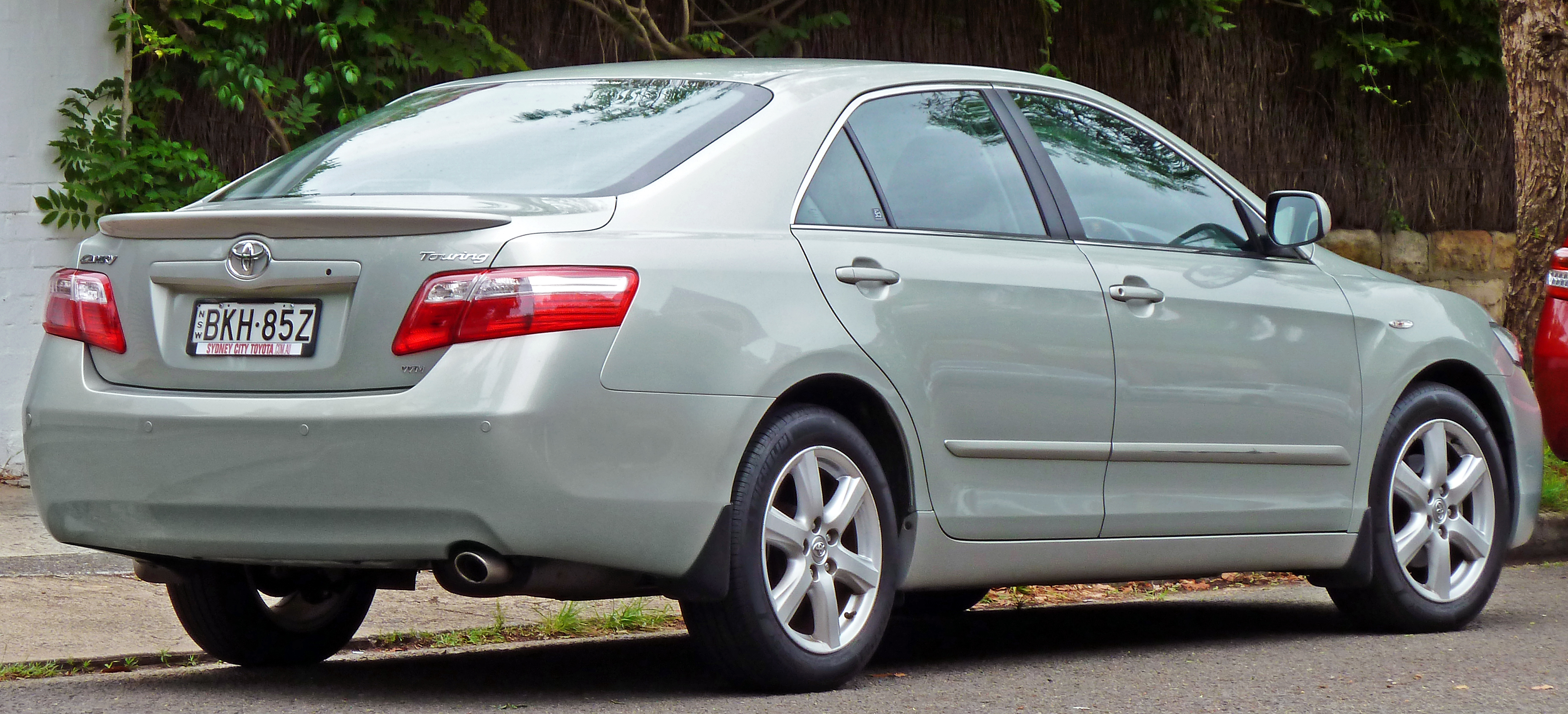
Toyota Camry Touring (Australia; pre-facelift)

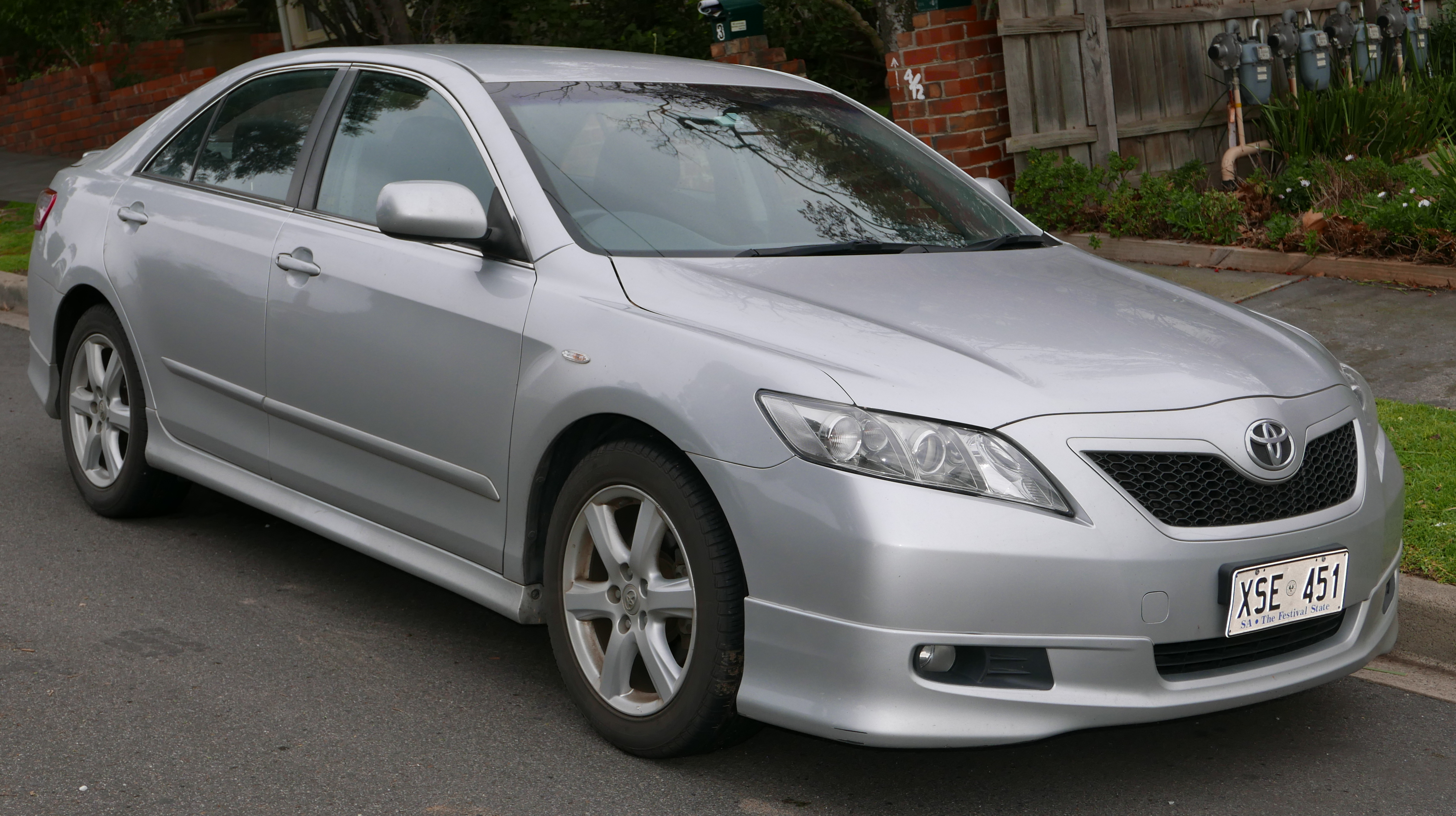

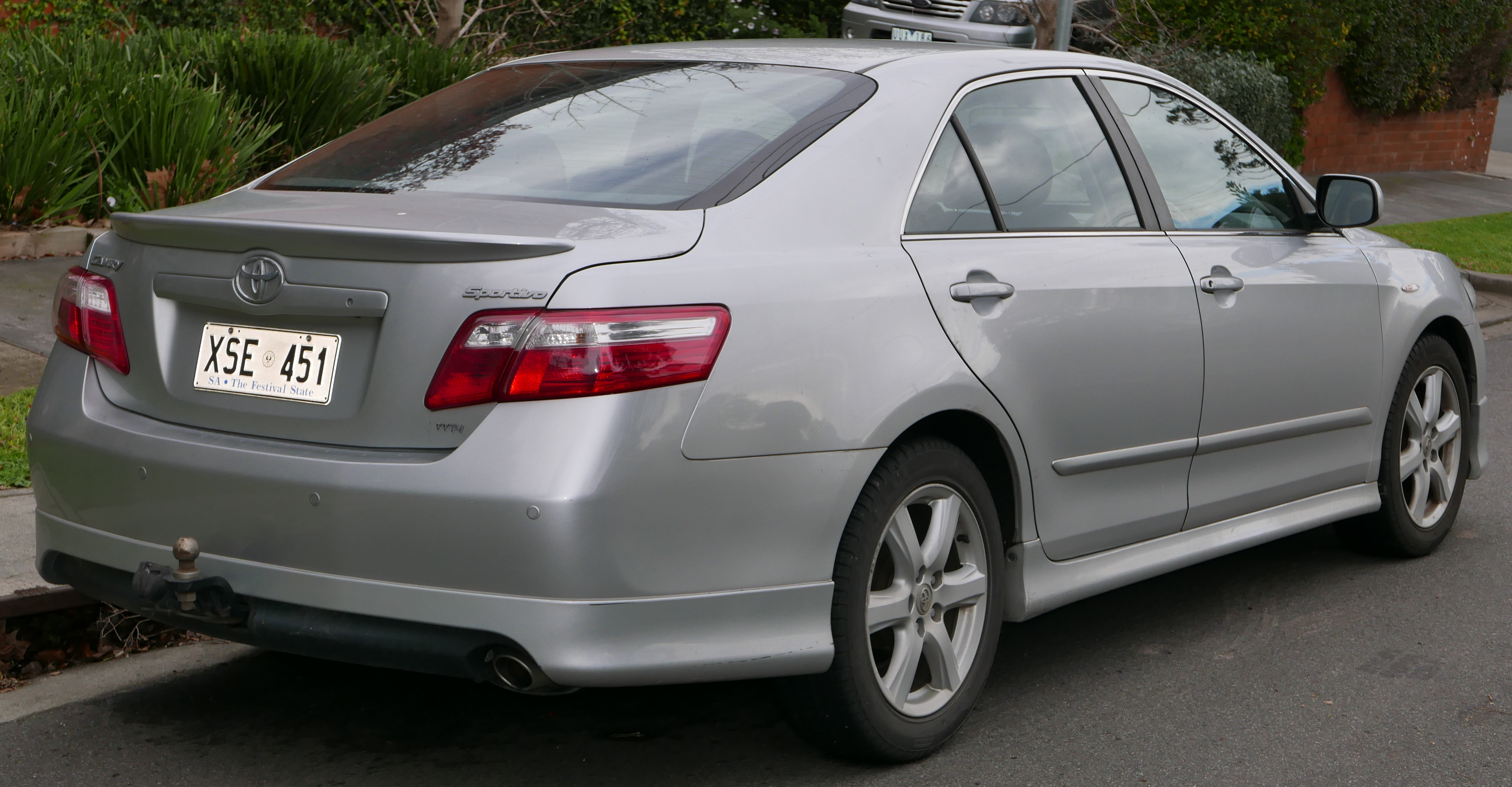
Toyota Camry Sportivo (Australia; pre-facelift)

For the first time since 1988, the Camry was marketed in Australasia with a four-cylinder engine only. This decision was made as the Aurion—a model which derives from the Camry—was offered in V6 configuration only. This two-tier strategy went against Toyota Australia's previous formula of offering four- and six-cylinder engines in the mid-size Camry alongside the larger six-cylinder Avalon. The simplified Australian Camry range comprised "Altise", "Sportivo", "Ateva" and "Grande". The model range in New Zealand followed this closely, offered in three levels of specification: "GL" (Altise), "Sportivo" and "GLX" (Grande). Equipment levels correspond directly with the Australian cars, although the full suite of airbags were fitted as standard on the "GL".

Equipment levels for the base model "Altise" comprised (at launch) air conditioning, cruise control, power windows and mirrors, 16-inch steel wheels and a single-disc CD player. The "Sportivo" grade added 17-inch alloy wheels, a body kit, front fog lamps, bolstered electrically adjustable front seats, leather-bound steering wheel, gear and handbrake levers, side and curtain airbags and an in-dash six-CD player. Building on the "Altise" specification, the "Ateva" gained 16-inch alloy wheels, a chrome grille surround, fog lamps, dual zone climate control air conditioning, side and curtain airbags, a six-stack CD audio system, power-adjustable front seats, automatic headlamps, trip computer and a leather-wrapped steering wheel, gear and handbrake levers. Furthering this, the "Grande" specification incorporates leather upholstery, wood grain inserts, satellite navigation, Vehicle Stability Control (VSC), Bluetooth connectivity, rain-sensing windscreen wipers, a sunroof and an electrically operated rear window blind.

VSC was not available across the range until August 2007, where it became standard on all variants. In May 2008, the Grande variant received a change in specification to the same set of alloy wheels as the "Sportivo" variant, as opposed to the previous style shared with the "Ateva" grade. Toyota released the "Ateva L" at the same time as this running change. The limited edition "Ateva L" added a rear lip spoiler, "Sportivo" alloy wheels and leather trim. A second limited edition XV40, the "Touring" was launched in April 2009 based on and priced identically to the automatic transmission-equipped "Altise". The "Touring" added 17-inch alloy wheels, the "Sportivo" grille, a chrome exhaust outlet, front fog lamps, a six-disc CD changer, dual zone climate control air conditioning and a leather steering wheel, handbrake and gear selection lever.

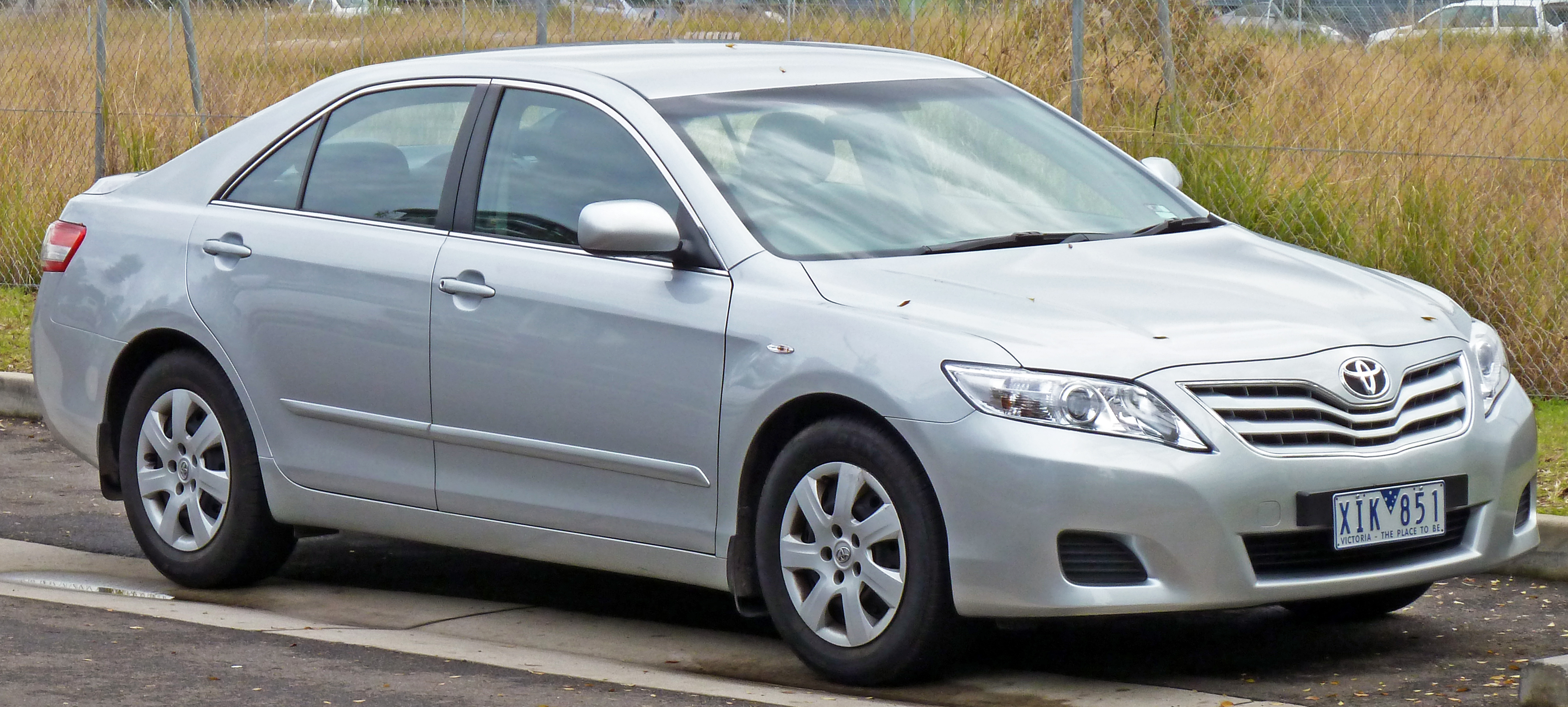

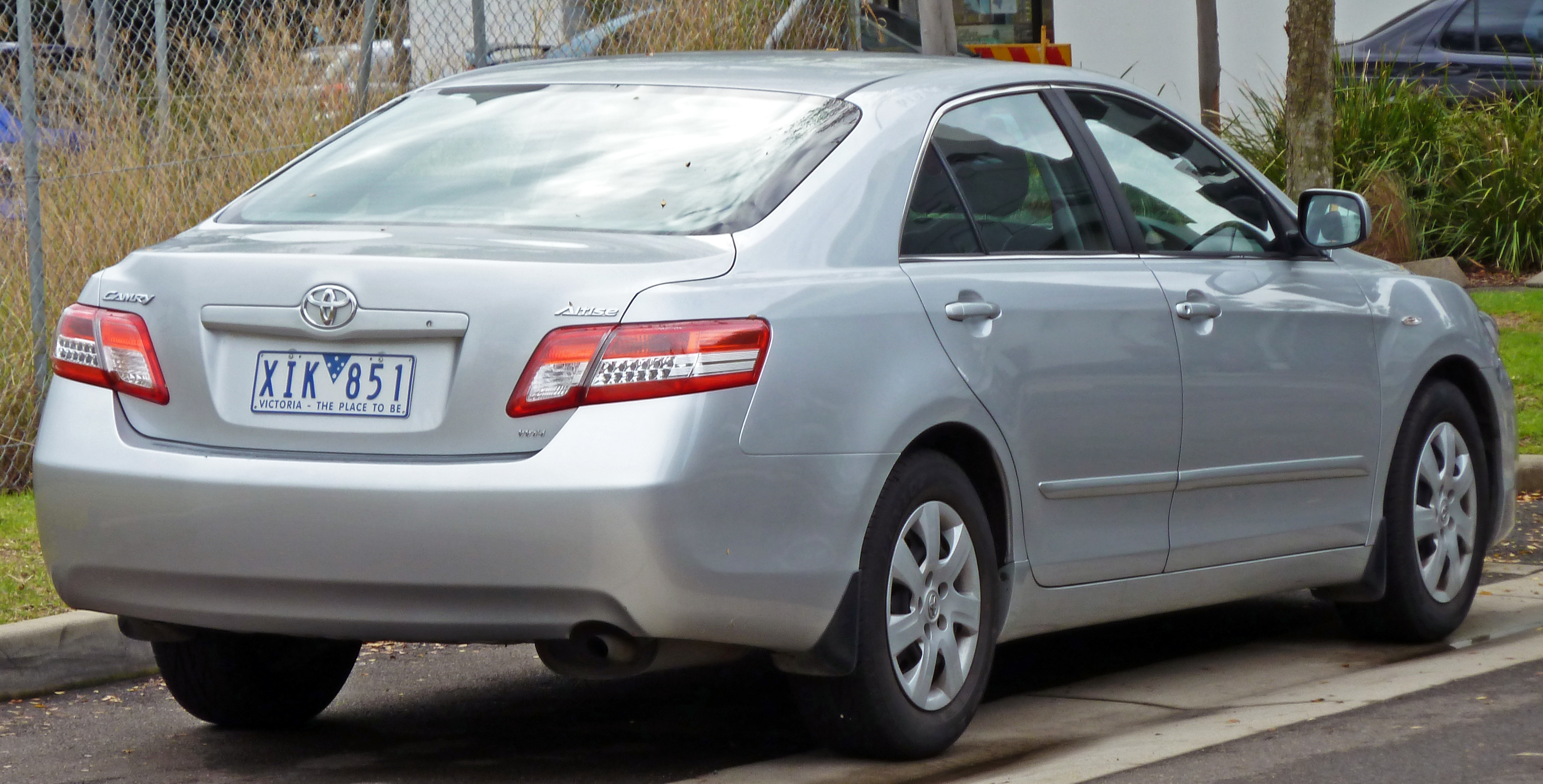
Toyota Camry Altise (Australia; facelift)

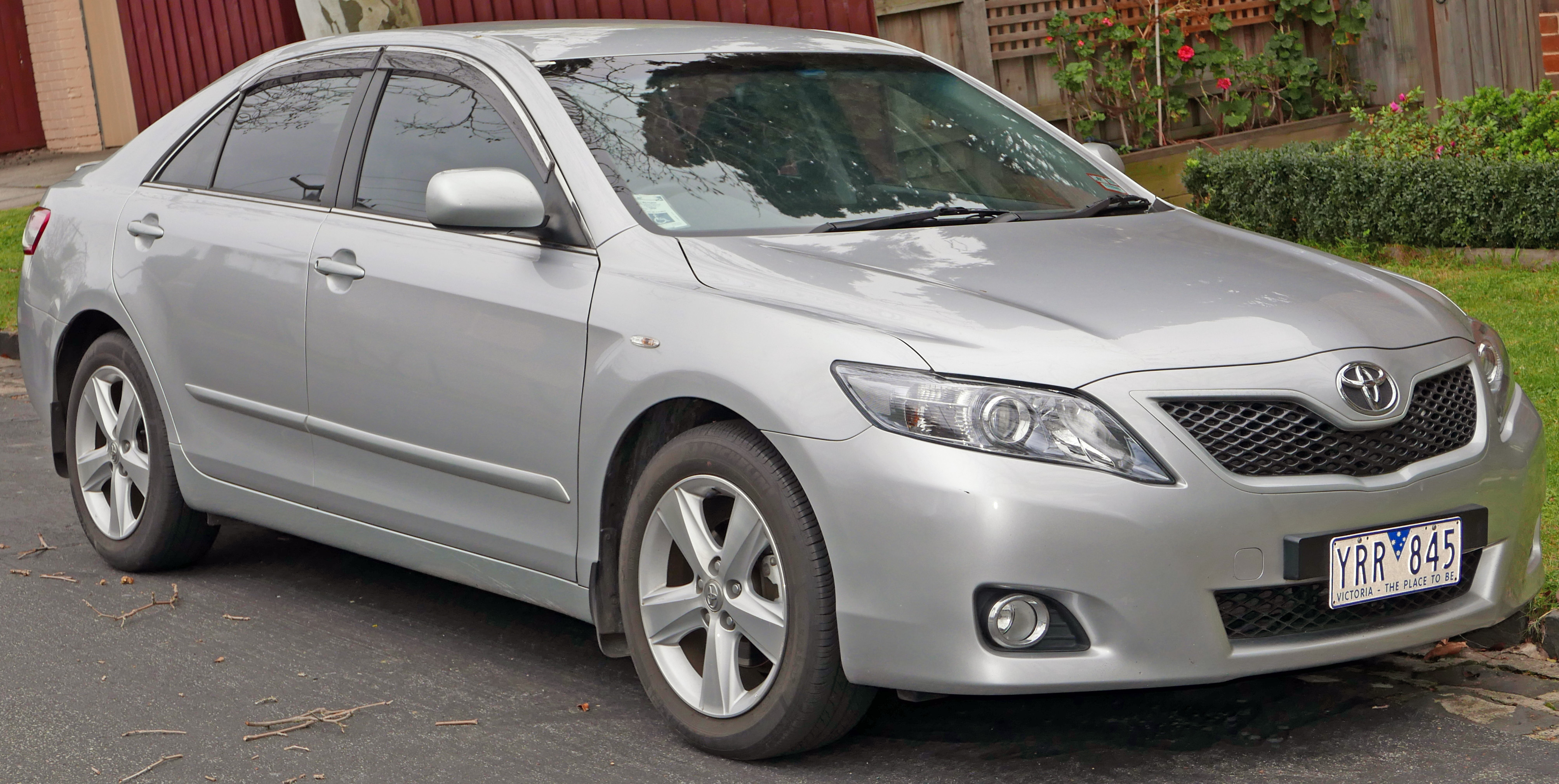
Toyota Camry Touring (Australia; facelift)

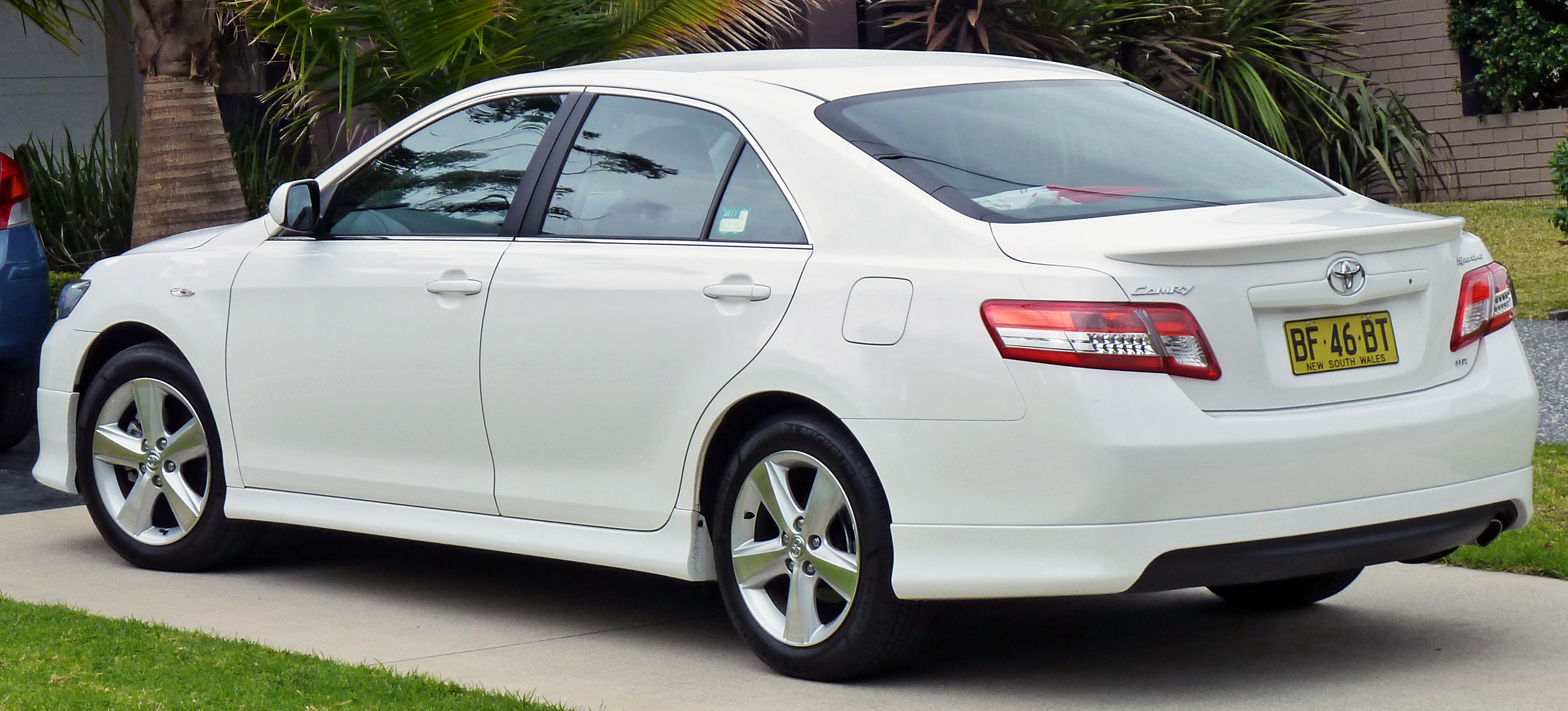
Toyota Camry Sportivo (Australia; facelift)

Further equipment upgrades arrived on 20 July 2009 when the facelifted Australian range went on sale. All variants now offered six airbags, Bluetooth, an auxiliary audio-input jack for the sound system, sun visor lamps and seatback pockets. The "Ateva" grade received a new audio system with 4.3-inch color LCD incorporating a rear-view camera, while the "Sportivo" variant gained the same LCD and dual-zone climate control. Upgrades for the "Grande" comprised keyless entry and starting system, rear parking sensors, an electrochromatic rear-view mirror, backup camera and an upgraded sound system. From March 2010 production, alloy wheels were made as standard fitment to the base "Altise". The limited edition "Touring" was re-launched the following June, this time adding a reversing camera, a rear lip spoiler and manual transmission availability over the previous release. Due to lack of demand, Australian manufacture of Camrys fitted with manual transmissions ended at the end of May 2011.

As part of the Australian Government's "Green Car Innovation Fund", Toyota received a A$35 million grant in June 2008 to guarantee the commencement of local production of the hybrid powertrain Camry. Prior to release, Toyota Australia displayed an official concept model, the "HC-CV" (Hybrid Camry Concept Vehicle) at the 2009 Melbourne International Motor Show. The "HC-CV" is distinguished from the facelifted Hybrid Camry design from which it is based by the inclusion of a modified front-end fascia, redesigned wheels and side skirts, a custom rear spoiler and leather upholstery incorporating the "Hybrid Synergy Drive" logo. Full-scale production began on 11 December 2009, after a small batch of pre-production vehicles were produced from 31 August. Toyota released the Hybrid Camry for sales in Australia during February 2010, with plans to sell an estimated 10,000 units per year. After its release, the Hybrid Camry became the first Australian-built vehicle to be rated the top five star grading on the Australian Government's "Green Vehicle Guide". The hybrid model is offered in two levels of trim, equivalent to the mid-range "Ateva" and luxury "Grande" gasoline-only variants. The undesignated entry-level specification is equipped identically to the "Ateva", except for the omission of electric front seats and the addition of reversing sensors, keyless entry/start and VDIM. An option pack sees the addition of a premium eight-speaker sound system, Bluetooth connectivity and satellite navigation. The second-level Hybrid Camry "Luxury" acquires leather interior trim, power-adjustable front seats, rain-sensing wipers, an electro-chromatic rear-view mirror and a rear lip spoiler. An option pack for the "Luxury" includes equipment of the aforementioned "base" option pack, plus a sunroof and interior lighting upgrades for rear passengers.

=== Europe ===
Toyota began producing the Camry at its Russian facility in December 2007. In Russia, the XV40 is available with either the 2.4-liter four-cylinder engine (with manual and automatic transmissions) or the 3.5-liter V6. Trim levels available in Russia comprise: Комфорт (Comfort), Элеганс (Elegance), Элеганс плюс (Elegance Plus), Престиж (Prestige) and Люкс (Deluxe).

=== North America ===
In North America, the 2007 model year XV40 series Camry came with a standard 2.4-liter four-cylinder engine or optional 3.5-liter V6. The 2.4-liter comes standard with a five-speed manual transmission; a five-speed automatic was optional on the "CE" and "SE" trims, standard on "LE" and "XLE". The V6 engine with six-speed automatic was optional on all trims except the base "CE", which was only available in the United States. After the 2008 model year, Toyota dropped the "CE" badge from the base-line trim.

Safety-wise, all XV40s in the United States and Canada came factory-equipped with dual frontal airbags, front seat-mounted side torso airbags, front and rear row side curtain airbags and a driver's knee airbag. A tire-pressure monitoring system, anti-lock brakes (ABS), brake assist and electronic brakeforce distribution were also standard. In the United States, Vehicle Stability Control (VSC) was optional on all models (except for the hybrid, where VDIM was standard) for the 2007 through to 2009 model years, but was standardized for 2009. Canadian specification 2007 and 2008 models had VSC standard on the V6-engined "SE" and "XLE" trims, optional on the "LE" V6, with VDIM again reserved for the hybrid. Toyota Canada extended VSC to all models during the 2009 model year, except the base "LE" four-cylinder model, where it was available as part of the Convenience Package. The 2010 facelifted models, sold in Canada from April 2009, have VSC standard.

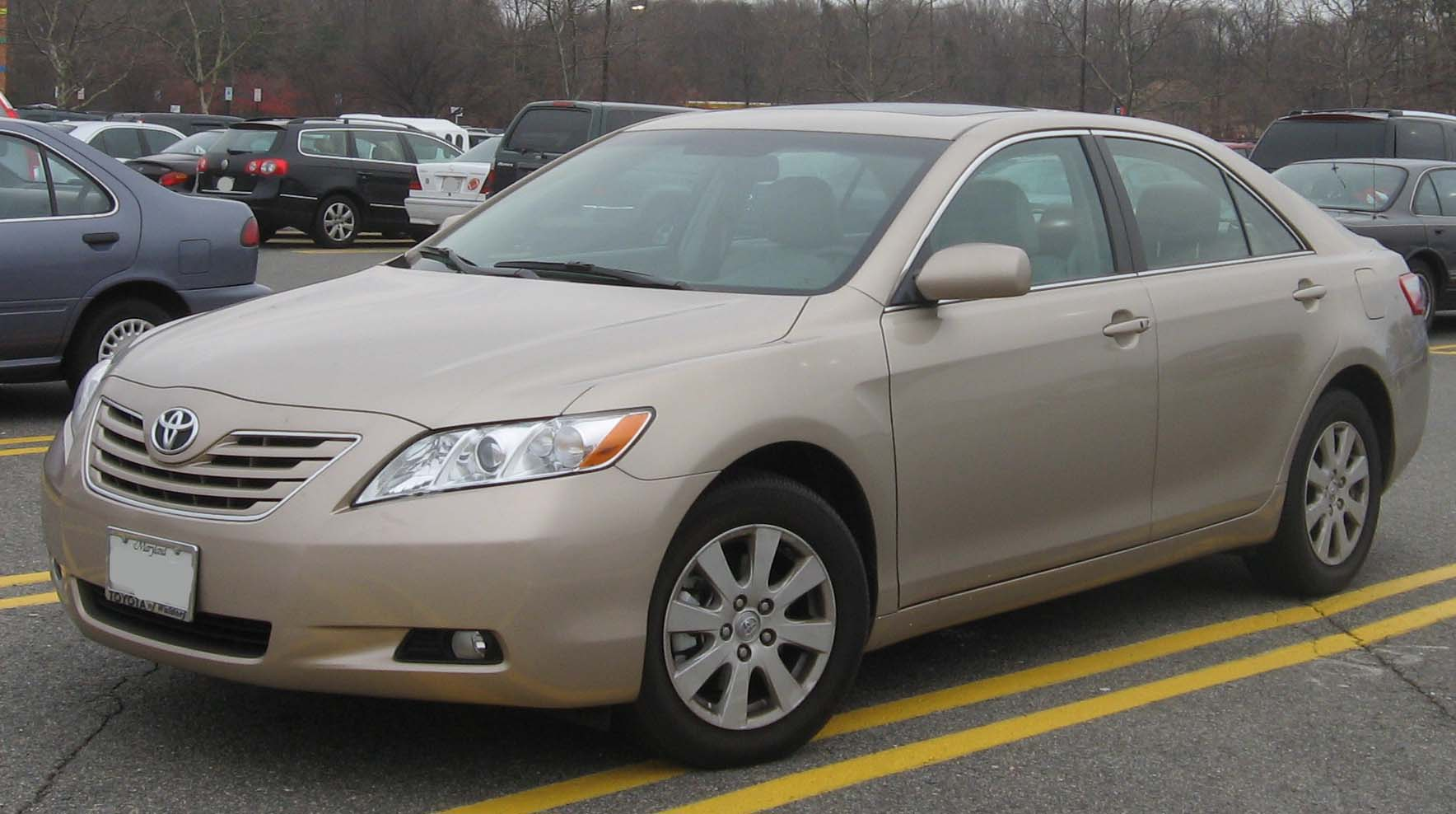
Toyota Camry XLE (US; pre-facelift)

On the entry level "CE", features included: 16-inch wheels, air conditioning, power windows and mirrors, cruise control and a six-speaker audio system with CD player and auxiliary input. Keyless entry and an eight-way power driver seat were added to the "LE" trim, with the "SE" gaining a firmer suspension tune, 17-inch alloy wheels, blue-tinged Optitron gauge illumination and sports-oriented interior and exterior trim modifications. The top-level "XLE" builds on the "LE" specification, with a six-CD JBL sound system rated at 440-watts, with integrated Bluetooth technology. Other "XLE" upgrades comprise a sunroof, automatic dual-zone climate control air conditioning with air filter, satellite navigation, wood grain highlights and reclining rear seats. On four-cylinder "XLE" models, the interior textile is coated using silkworm cocoon extract, while heated front seats and full leather upholstery are standard on the "XLE" fitted with the V6. Navigation was introduced as an option for the XLE 4-cylinder (previously exclusive to the XLE 6-cylinder on the fifth generation), and Smart Key System was introduced as an option to the 6-cylinder XLE.

Features include an optional ion air purifier type filtration system. For 2010, a backup camera became optional on the SE and XLE trims. The new 2.5-liter straight-4 engines replace the previous 2.4-liter four-cylinder in non-hybrid models. A more powerful version is exclusive to the Camry SE, and Toyota's Smart Key System is now available for the SE and the 4-cyl XLE (previously only available to the 6-cyl XLE).

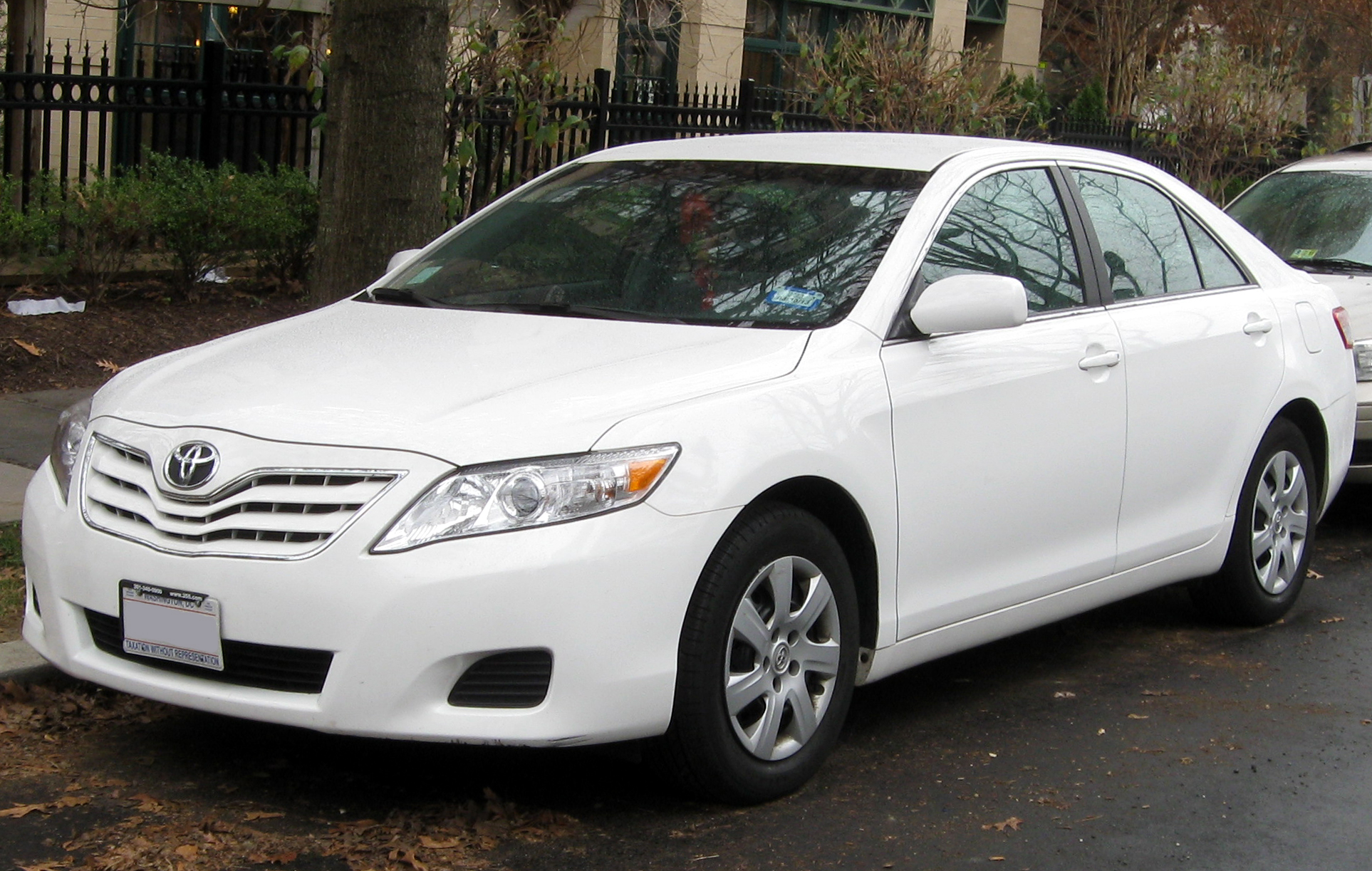
Toyota Camry LE (US; facelift)

Sales in the United States, the primary market for the Camry, significantly increased in the year following release. In April 2007, Toyota began producing additional Camry models at Subaru of Indiana Automotive in Lafayette, Indiana. In a Cars.com American-Made Index study, the Camry was ranked highest, all models sold in the US are assembled there.

Consumer Reports 2007 Annual Car Reliability Survey gave the V6 version of the Camry a "below average" rating, due to transmission issues thus removing the V6 Camry from Consumer Reports' "Recommended" list. This rating does not apply to the four-cylinder and hybrid versions, which continued to be recommended. However, these problems have been corrected, and the V6 version has improved to "average". The first three model years of this generation Camry equipped with a four-cylinder engine were also plagued by excessive oil consumption issues. Many owners claimed their engines would lose over one quart of oil in as little as 1,600 km (1,000 miles). Toyota later did a warranty enhancement program to correct this issue free of charge to customers. Toyota also offered full refunds to owners who previously paid for repairs, even if the repairs were performed before the warranty enhancement program.

The Camry Hybrid is very similar to the XLE, but has standard cloth seats, the hybrid powertrain and VDIM. To commemorate 50 years of Toyota sales in the United States, Toyota built a special edition 2007 Camry Hybrid. The 50th Anniversary Edition was limited to 3,000 units and features unique wheels and badging, and is painted exclusively in the "Blizzard Pearl" color. The Hybrid Camry has also received two awards in North America: the 2007 Green Car of the Year awarded by Green Car Journal, and the 2007 Car of the Year in the Family Sedan (over CA$30,000) category awarded by the Automobile Journalists Association of Canada.

When released, the EPA rated the hybrid about 27 percent more economical on the combined cycle compared to the non-hybrid 2.4-liter automatic version. United States Environmental Protection Agency (EPA) fuel economy ratings for the 2007 Toyota Camry Hybrid are 40 mpg_{‑US} (5.9 L/100 km; 48 mpg_{‑imp}) (City) and 38 mpg_{‑US} (6.2 L/100 km; 46 mpg_{‑imp}) (Highway). EPA's revised method of estimating fuel economy for 2008 and subsequent model years, which now considers the effects of air conditioning, rapid acceleration and cold temperatures, estimates 33 mpg_{‑US} (7.1 L/100 km; 40 mpg_{‑imp}) (city) and 34 mpg_{‑US} (6.9 L/100 km; 41 mpg_{‑imp}) (highway).

The California Air Resources Board (CARB) has certified the Camry Hybrid as AT-PZEV, while the EPA has assigned it a Tier II, Bin 3 score for most states a cleaner version is sold to CARB states. The hybrid also meets the US Super Ultra Low Emission Vehicle (SULEV) standards which means it produces minimal emissions of hydrocarbons, nitrous oxides and carbon monoxide, and up to year model 2010 it had an Environmental Protection Agency (EPA) "Greenhouse Gas Score" of 9.5 for California and 8.0 for federal certified vehicles.

In North America, the Camry Hybrid has benefited from several government incentives relating to taxation and special provisions in carpool lanes (see: hybrid tax credit and government incentives for fuel efficient vehicles in the United States for more information).

This generation was entered into stock car racing in the United States in 2007 as part of Toyota's entry into NASCAR. The move made the XV40 Camry the first foreign vehicle in the NASCAR circuit since the British-built MG MGA was used in the Grand National Series in 1963. The succeeding XV50 generation would continue participation of the Toyota Camry in NASCAR.
