= Kerr-McGee Corp. v. Navajo Tribe =

Kerr-McGee v. Navajo Tribe
- Supreme Court of the United States

Argued February 25, 1985 Decided April 16, 1985
- Full case name: Kerr-McGee Corp. v. Navajo Tribe of Indians
- Citations: 471 U.S. 195 (more) 105 S. Ct. 1900; 85 L. Ed. 2d 200; 1985 U.S. LEXIS 2738

Case history
- Prior: 731 F.2d 597 (9th Cir. 1984); cert. granted, 469 U.S. 879 (1984).

Holding
- An Indian tribe is not required to obtain the approval of the Secretary of the Interior in order to impose taxes on non-tribal persons or entities doing business on a reservation

Court membership
- Chief Justice Warren E. Burger Associate Justices William J. Brennan Jr. · Byron White; Thurgood Marshall · Harry Blackmun; Lewis F. Powell Jr. · William Rehnquist; John P. Stevens · Sandra Day O'Connor

Case opinion
- Majority: Burger, joined by Brennan, White, Marshall, Blackmun, Rehnquist, Stevens, O'Connor
- Powell took no part in the consideration or decision of the case.

Laws applied
- 25 U.S.C. § 461

Kerr-McGee v. Navajo Tribe, 471 U.S. 195 (1985), was a case in which the Supreme Court of the United States held that an Indian tribe is not required to obtain the approval of the Secretary of the Interior in order to impose taxes on non-tribal persons or entities doing business on a reservation.

== Background ==
Map of Navajo reservation

=== History ===
The Navajo Tribe is an Indian (Native American) Nation with a reservation located in parts of Arizona, Utah and New Mexico. In 1978, the tribal council passed two taxing ordinances. The first was a tax of 3% on leaseholds (such as mineral rights) and the second was a 5% tax on business activity. The tribe forwarded the ordinances to the Bureau of Indian Affairs (BIA) in the Department of the Interior for approval. The BIA informed the tribe that there was no law that required federal approval for a tribal tax.

=== Lower courts ===
Kerr-McGee held substantial mineral rights in the reservation and filed a lawsuit in the federal district court seeking an injunction to prohibit the tribe from collecting the tax. Kerr-McGee argued that any tax of non-Indians by a tribe required approval by the Secretary of the Interior and the district court agreed, granting the injunction. The tribe appealed to the Ninth Circuit Court of Appeals. The Ninth Circuit overruled the district court, finding no federal statute or regulation required such approval. Kerr-McGee then appealed to the Supreme Court, which granted certiorari and agreed to hear the case.

== Decision ==
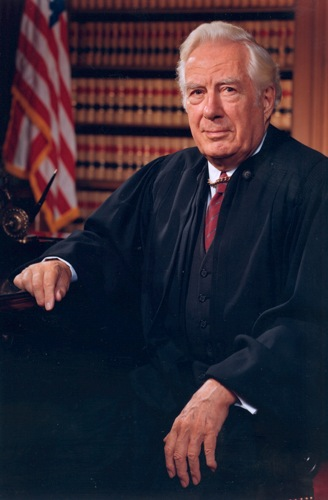
Chief Justice Warren Burger, author of the unanimous opinion

=== Arguments ===
Alvin H. Shrago argued the case for Kerr-McGee. Elizabeth Bernstein argued the case for the tribe. The United States argued the case on behalf of the tribe. Amicus curiae briefs were filed in support of Kerr-McGee by the Arizona Public Service Co., the Peabody Coal Co., the Phillips Petroleum Co., the Salt River Project Agricultural Improvement and Power District and Texaco, Inc. Amicus curiae briefs were filed in support of the tribe by Association on American Indian Affairs and for the Shoshone Indian Tribe Reservation.

Kerr-McGee argued that the Indian Reorganization Act (IRA) required the Secretary of the Interior to approve any tribal taxes on non-Indians. They also argued that the Indian Mineral Leasing Act (IMLA) required BIA approval for taxes.

=== Opinion of the Court ===
Chief Justice Burger delivered the unanimous opinion of the court. Burger noted that the IRA only required BIA approval of tribal constitutions and bylaws, not the power to tax. He noted that it would not affect the Navajo tribe in any case, since the tribe declined to accept the provisions of the IRA. Burger also took note that the tribal authority to tax had been recognized long before the IRA was enacted. The IMLA also did not require approval for taxes, merely requiring that the Secretary issue regulations on oil and gas leases, which he has done. The regulations do not require his approval for taxes by tribes.

Burger noted that the policy of the federal government was to promote tribal self-government, and the power to tax is an inherent power of government. When a tribe executes a mineral rights lease it is acting in a commercial matter, and that does not prevent the tribe from exercising tribal sovereignty in enacting a tax. Since there is no federal law prohibiting such a tax, the tribe is within its rights to enact one. The judgment of the Ninth Circuit was affirmed.

== Subsequent developments ==
Kerr-McGee is one of a series of cases where the Supreme Court has ruled, based on tribal sovereignty, that tribes have the right to tax non-Indians. These cases led to tribes renegotiating inequitable mineral leases, forming their own natural resources regulatory agencies, and tribal development companies. In the case of the Navajo tribe, which had a long history of uranium mining and radioactive contamination of both tribal members and its water sources by mining firms (including Kerr-McGee), it supported the outright ban on uranium mining. It has been used to support the right of tribes to control their natural resources, including exercising civil jurisdiction over non-Indians. In recognition of the importance of the decision to the tribe, the tribal council declared that the date of the decision was a tribal holiday, known as "Navajo National Sovereignty Day."

== See also ==
- Uranium mining and the Navajo people
- List of United States Supreme Court cases, volume 471
