= Indian Mineral Leasing Act =

1938 US law

Indian Mineral Leasing Act of 1938
- Other short titles: IMLA
- Long title: An Act to regulate the leasing of certain Indian lands for mining purposes.
- Acronyms (colloquial): IMLA
- Enacted by: the 75th United States Congress
- Effective: May 11, 1938

Citations
- Public law: Public Law 75-506
- Statutes at Large: 52 Stat. 347

Codification
- U.S.C. sections created: 25 U.S.C. §§ 396a–396g

Legislative history
- Introduced in the Senate as S. 2649 by D‑OK Elmer Thomasth on June 14, 1937; Committee consideration by Senate Committee on Indian Affairs; Passed the Senate on August 14, 1937 (Voice vote); Passed the House on May 2, 1938 (Voice vote); Signed into law by President Franklin D. Roosevelt on May 11, 1938

United States Supreme Court cases
- Montana v. Blackfeet Tribe (1985), United States v. Navajo Nation (2003)

The Indian Mineral Leasing Act (IMLA) was a 1938 United States law. It was passed on May 11, 1938, by the 75th United States Congress.

The Act made it so that after May 11, 1938, unallotted lands within Indian reservations or lands owned by Native Americans under Federal jurisdiction could, with the approval of the Secretary of the Interior, be leased for mining purposes by the authority of the tribal council or other authorized spokesmen for the Native Americans, for indefinite terms ("as long as minerals are produced in paying quantities").

The IMLA was enacted in response to decades of exploitative mineral leasing on Native lands. Before this Act, tribes had little to no control over these terms. The Act aimed to give tribes greater authority over their natural resources.

== History ==
Throughout the 18th and 19th centuries, non-Indians were prohibited from leasing Indian lands, with military control enforcing these restrictions. The Royal Proclamation of 1763 and subsequent treaties confirmed Indian land boundaries and prohibited unauthorized sales or leases. The Trade and Intercourse Acts established federal authority over Indian land transactions, requiring federal approval for any land sales or leases. The General Allotment Act of 1887 aimed to individualize land ownership among tribes, promoting assimilation into white culture. Leasing was initially restricted, allowing only those unable to farm to lease their land, with strict approval from the Secretary of the Interior. The Dawes Act was amended in 1891 to allow leasing of Native American land "not needed for farming or agricultural purposes [and] not desired for individual allotments" for mineral extraction for the first time. Several amendments were made throughout the 1890s and early 1900s. In 1909, allotted lands were included, and lease terms were extended from a 10-year limitation to "as long as the leases were productive" ("any term of years as may be deemed advisable"). In 1924, state taxation was authorized on all royalties (which had previously required explicit congressional authorization). In 1927, leases were extended to "all [Native American] land", but taxation was limited to oil and gas.

The IMLA was enacted to rectify these existing precedents with the 1934 Indian Reorganization Act, which had altered the system of tribal sovereignty in the United States. The stated intentions of the IMLA by Congress were to develop tribal sovereignty, standardize leasing, and increase profits to lease-holders. However, the IMLA did not authorize Native American lease-holders to terminate leases, nor could they enforce regulations once projects had begun. The DOI sold at below-market prices, failed to protect the environment, and did not ensure royalties were properly paid. Indefinite leases allowed businesses to manipulate markets and minimize royalties to lease-holders.

The lack of an explicit clause on taxation in the IMLA led to Montana v. Blackfeet Tribe of Indians, which re-established explicit congressional authorization for state taxation of IMLA leases, while upholding taxation for leases under the 1924 Act.

The system established by the IMLA was later revised by the 1969 National Environmental Policy Act, the Indian Self-Determination and Education Assistance Act of 1975, the Indian Mineral Development Act of 1982, and the Energy Policy Acts of 1992 and 2005, among others.

== Court cases ==
In 1964, the Navajo Nation leased land to Peabody Western Coal Company under the IMLA for the purpose of coal mining. The royalties were set at 37.5 cents per ton of mined coal. By 1984, the rate was under market value, which then prompted the Navajo Nation to request a rate adjustment. The Secretary eventually set the rate at 20% and quickly lowered it to 12.5% after Peabody Western Coal Company lobbied for a lower rate. Alleging that the U.S. government and the Secretary were under the improper influence of Peabody Western Coal Company, the Navajo Nation sued the U.S. government on the grounds that they breached fiduciary duties.

The Court of Federal Claims initially ruled against the Navajo Nation and claimed that the IMLA did not cover monetary damages. After review, the Federal Circuit reversed this ruling and found liability based on a broader range of statutes and regulations. The Supreme Court ruled that the IMLA did not create a money-mandating fiduciary duty, but reopened the case for further review and proceedings. Once again, the Federal Circuit found liability.

The case raised questions regarding U.S.-tribal relations and the federal government's fiduciary duties to Indian Tribes.

== Impact on the environment and native communities ==
The IMLA helps Native American tribes earn money and increases the control tribes have over the process of extraction on their land by allowing companies to mine on their land. But even though tribes could make deals, they had to get permission from the U.S. government first as well as The Secretary of the Interior. This meant the government had most of the control, not the tribes Because of this, tribes couldn't always protect their land or make quick decisions. This created a dual system of tribal freedoms and federal trusteeship that has since led to legal disputes. Mining caused serious problems—like dirty water, bad air, and damaged land making which made Native American's living conditions harsh. The tribes cannot negotiate leases, interact in the process of operations, or set rates.

Some tribes made money from this, but others were left with the mess. The system was complicated, and tribes didn't always have the tools or support they needed to fix the damage. So even though the law was supposed to help, it sometimes caused more harm than good. Native communities still deal with these problems. Today there are 160,000 abandoned mines in the western United States which have led to hazardous substances. Uranium being a main one as well as a couple of metals this has raised tribes risk of kidney disease and chronic illnesses.

== Limitation and criticism ==
Although the IMLA gave tribes more control over their land, it still had some major problems. One issue that the government, through the Secretary of the Interior, still had the final say on any lease agreements. This caused many delays and made it hard for tribes to make decision quickly. Along with this, it led to inconsistent enforcement, and conflicts due to the fact the federal agencies were working closely with mining companies to exploit natives and their land.

Because this Act does not clearly define whether the governments' place, legal gaps allowed federal officials to approve leases that may not have been fair or beneficial to tribes. This leads to the government retaining ultimate control over tribal economic decision, undermining true sovereignty. This, hence, caused major feuds between tribal nation like the Navajo and industrial companies. An example of battles between the two was most notably United States v. Navajo Nation. What sparked this feud was because the government allowed deals that simply were unfair and exploitative towards the Navajo Nation. Though the IMLA was a step forward for tribal autonomy, there was still many gaps that allowed these Native communities to go unprotected.
