= Energy Policy Act =

Energy Policy Act may refer to U.S. Federal:

- Energy Policy Act of 1992
- Energy Policy Act of 2005

== See also ==
- Federal Power Act
- Internal Revenue Service and Federal Hybrid Tax Credit Summary
- Energy Independence and Security Act of 2007
