= Board of Trustees of Scarsdale v. McCreary =

1985 United States Supreme Court case on the Establishment Clause

- Supreme Court of the United States

Argued February 20, 1985 Decided March 27, 1985
- Full case name: Board of Trustees of the Village of Scarsdale, et al. v. Kathleen S. McCreary, et al.
- Docket no.: 84-277
- Citations: 471 U.S. 83 (more) 105 S. Ct. 1859; 85 L. Ed. 2d 63; 1985 U.S. LEXIS 194
- Argument: Oral argument
- Opinion announcement: Opinion announcement

Case history
- Prior: McCreary v. Stone, 575 F. Supp. 1112 (S.D.N.Y. 1983); 739 F.2d 716 (2d Cir. 1984)

Holding
- Judgement of the Court of Appeals for the Second Circuit is affirmed as per an evenly split Court. Due to ambiguity in the lower court's decision, it is unclear whether the Village is obliged to display a privately-sponsored nativity scene on public land or if it may adopt neutral rules permitting the exclusion of the nativity scene.

Court membership
- Chief Justice Warren E. Burger Associate Justices William J. Brennan Jr. · Byron White; Thurgood Marshall · Harry Blackmun; Lewis F. Powell Jr. · William Rehnquist; John P. Stevens · Sandra Day O'Connor

Case opinion
- Per curiam
- Powell took no part in the consideration or decision of the case.

Laws applied
- U.S. Const. amend. I

Board of Trustees of Scarsdale v. McCreary, 471 U.S. 83 (1985), was a United States Supreme Court case in which an evenly split Court upheld per curiam a lower court's decision that the display of a privately sponsored nativity scene on public property does not violate the Establishment Clause of the First Amendment.

== Background ==
The Village of Scarsdale (coextensive with the Town of Scarsdale) in Westchester County, New York had permitted since 1957 the annual display of creches sponsored by the Scarsdale Creche Committee, a private organization, in Boniface Circle, a small public park in the central business district, for about two weeks during the Christmas season. However, in 1981, the Village Board of Trustees began barring the placement of nativity scenes in the park due to increasing opposition from residents, fifty percent of whom were Jewish, who deemed it "unneighborly" and "insensitive."

In 1983, the Creche Committee along with a group of twelve residents (one of whom is resident Kathleen McCreary), referred to as the Citizens' Group, brought a suit against the Scarsdale Board of Trustees in the U.S. District Court for the Southern District of New York, arguing that the Board's withdrawal of permission to display the nativity scene in the park was a violation of the First Amendment's protection of free speech and free exercise of religion. Judge Charles E. Stewart, Jr. ruled on December 8, 1983, in the case of McCreary v. Stone that the display of the nativity scene did, indeed, constitute an impermissible establishment of religion, stating that ''when a symbol is left on public land, the land becomes the message-bearer.''

The decision was appealed and argued before the United States Court of Appeals for the Second Circuit in June 1984. The appeals court affirmed the district court's determination that the Village's denial of the display of the nativity scene was content-based (meaning the denial was based on the religious nature of the display) as well as its findings of fact. However, the court of appeals disagreed with the district court's analysis of Widmar v. Vincent (on which its decision was partially based) in light of Lynch v. Donnelly (which came only one month after the district court's ruling) saying "an equal-access policy would not contravene the establishment clause." The court of appeals reversed the decision and remanded the case.

The Scarsdale Board interpreted the court of appeals' decision to mean it was compelled to display the nativity scene on public land. The board of trustees voted unanimously to appeal the decision to the Supreme Court.

== Issue ==
At issue was whether the display of a privately sponsored nativity scene, a religious symbol, on public land was a violation of the separation of church and state laid out in the Establishment Clause of the First Amendment to the Constitution. This protection against the establishment of religion was balanced against the First Amendment protections of free speech and free exercise of religion.

== Opinion of the Court ==
The case was argued before the Supreme Court on February 20, 1985, and a decision was announced on March 27, 1985.

Justice Powell did not partake in the consideration and decision of the case because he was recovering from surgery at the time. With an evenly split Court, the decision of the lower court of appeals was affirmed per curiam. The Supreme Court declined to order that the case be re-argued at a later date.

It is ambiguous in the lower court's decision whether the village government may adopt neutral rules permitting or excluding the display of a privately sponsored nativity scene on public land or whether it is obliged to permit the display of the nativity scene on public land.

Justices O'Connor, Rehnquist and White during oral argument disagreed with the Village's interpretation of the appeals court's decision as meaning it was compelled to display the nativity scene on public lands. Instead, they read the decision more narrowly to state that the Village may prohibit the nativity scene on a more neutral basis.

== See also ==
- List of United States Supreme Court cases, volume 471
- Lynch v. Donnelly (1984)
