= Central Intelligence Agency v. Sims =

1985 U.S. Supreme Court case on FOIA exemptions

- Supreme Court of the United States

Argued December 4, 1984 Decided April 16, 1985
- Full case name: Central Intelligence Agency v. John Cary Sims et al.
- Citations: 471 U.S. 159 (more)
- Argument: Oral argument
- Decision: Opinion

Case history
- Prior: Judgment for plaintiffs, 479 F. Supp. 84; judgment affirmed in part and remanded, 642 F.2d 562; judgment reversed in part, affirmed in part, 709 F.2d 95

Questions presented
- Whether scientific researchers used by the CIA in Project MKUltra are intelligence sources whose names were exempt from disclosure under the Freedom of Information Act.

Holding
- The Director of the Central Intelligence Agency's use of the National Security Act to withhold the identities of the individual researchers and their institutional affiliations as intelligence sources is proper.

Court membership
- Chief Justice Warren E. Burger Associate Justices William J. Brennan Jr. · Byron White; Thurgood Marshall · Harry Blackmun; Lewis F. Powell Jr. · William Rehnquist; John P. Stevens · Sandra Day O'Connor

Case opinions
- Majority: Burger, joined by White, Blackmun, Powell, Rehnquist, Stevens, O'Connor
- Concurrence: Marshall (in judgment), joined by Brennan

Laws applied
- National Security Act of 1947

Central Intelligence Agency v. Sims, 471 U.S. 159 (1985), is a decision of the Supreme Court of the United States that permitted the Central Intelligence Agency (CIA) to withhold the identities and institutional affiliations of researchers who worked on Project MKUltra. The project was conducted by the CIA, and it focused on human experimentation. Reversing the lower courts, the Supreme Court held that the CIA could classify the researchers as intelligence sources to prevent public disclosure of their names and institutions.

== Background ==
From 1953 to 1973, the Central Intelligence Agency operated Project MKUltra, subjecting American and Canadian citizens to experimentation without their prior knowledge or informed consent. The project involved the use of drugs including LSD, heroin, and morphine. The CIA utilized the assistance of 185 individual researchers across around 80 institutions.

=== Case history ===
The plaintiffs were attorney John Cary Sims and Sidney M. Wolfe, director of Public Citizen. They began by filing a Freedom of Information Act request for MKUltra documents discovered in 1977, which had been assumed as destroyed in 1973. Sims and Wolfe requested information about grant proposals, CIA contracts, names and institutional affiliations of MKUltra researchers, and facilities used. The CIA partially complied, but it declined to release the researchers' names and affiliations, as well as the names of 21 facilities used in the project. Sims and Wolfe sued the CIA in the U.S. District Court for the District of Columbia to compel release of that information as well.

The District Court ruled in favor of the plaintiffs, holding that MKUltra researchers were not "intelligence sources," so their names could not be withheld from FOIA requests. On appeal, the U.S. Court of Appeals for the D.C. Circuit remanded, ordering the District Court to define "intelligence source." The District Court determined that researchers who had previously received a guarantee of confidentiality were exempt from disclosure, but the other researchers were not intelligence sources.

On a second appeal, the D.C. Circuit again remanded after rejecting promises of confidentiality as a basis for identifying intelligence sources. The CIA then appealed the D.C. Circuit's decision to the U.S. Supreme Court.

=== Relevant statutes ===
Any citizen can make a FOIA request for the government to produce records held in an agency's possession, only limited by statutory exemptions. The Act's third exemption authorizes refusal to disclose classified information subject to a relevant statute. Both the National Security Act of 1947 and the Central Intelligence Agency Act were used to justify the CIA's refusal to disclose MKUltra records. The CIA Act, however, was largely intended by its drafters to apply to the CIA's foreign operations, not its domestic activities.

The case primarily involved application of the National Security Act of 1947. This law assigned responsibility for the protection of "intelligence sources and methods" to the CIA Director. The act did not define "intelligence sources," so this term has been defined by courts. The District Court had rejected the CIA Director's proposed definition as an "overbroad interpretation".

== Decision ==
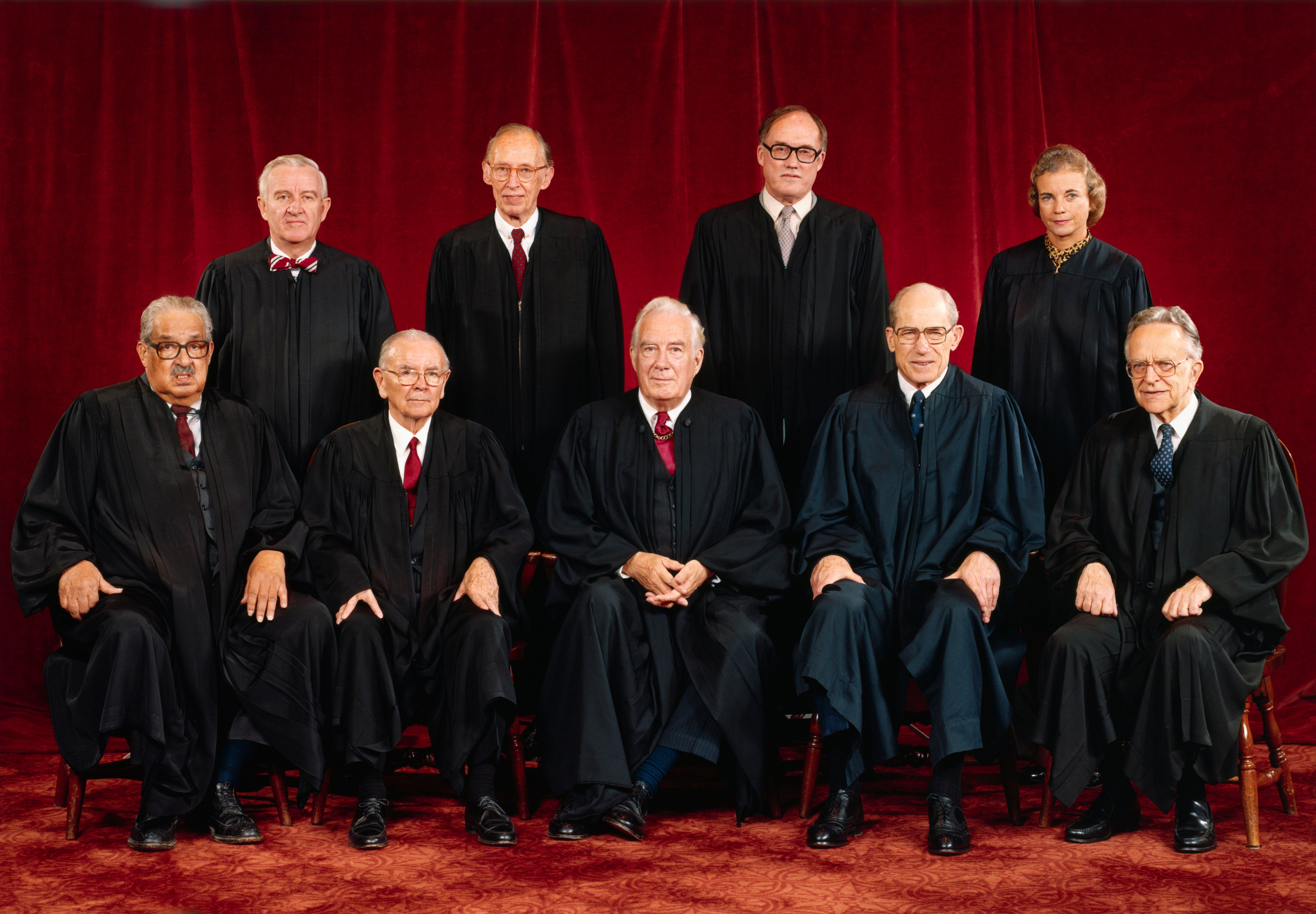
The Supreme Court justices who decided Central Intelligence Agency v. Sims

The decision was unanimously in favor of the Central Intelligence Agency, with Chief Justice Warren E. Burger delivering the opinion of the court, joined in full by Justices White, Blackmun, Powell, Rehnquist, Stevens, and O'Connor. The Court concluded that someone who is an intelligence source under the National Security Act "provides, or is engaged to provide, information the agency needs to fulfill its statutory obligations", which fit the researchers at issue in the case and was broader than the D.C. Cir. approach. The majority opinion found that the National Security Act permits withholding of information under FOIA's third exemption because the CIA Director is responsible for protecting intelligence sources. Throughout the majority opinion, Chief Justice Burger repeatedly deferred to the CIA's withholding discretion, rejecting de novo judicial review of such decisions.

Associate Justice Thurgood Marshall concurred in the judgment to argue for a narrower definition guided by legislative intent, joined by Justice Brennan. While agreeing the D.C. Cir. approach was too narrow, Marshall argued the majority went too far in permititng the CIA to withhold records entirely unrelated to maintaining secrecy. Marshall felt the CIA should have instead relied on FOIA's first exemption for information classified by an executive order, which he felt would maintain judicial review.

== Legal reaction and analysis ==
Legal scholars critiqued the majority opinion, largely arguing it newly limited judicial review by lower courts. Michael Hughes, in the Catholic University Law Review, argued that the majority had cited and thus focused on the legislative record of the National Security Act, despite most of the congressional debate focusing on the overall creation of an intelligence agency, rather than Freedom of Information Act exemptions. Hughes criticized the Court's decision in failing to determine the overall role of the judiciary in determining whether material should be disclose, and instead deferring to the CIA's discretion in determining which material was suitable for public release upon receipt of a FOIA request.

In analyzing cases that followed Sims, Martin Halstuk, writing in the UC Law Communications and Entertainment Law Journal, found that while the Court's majority opinion deferred to the CIA Director on document withholding, lower courts still disagreed on the appropriate level of discretion. Halstuk found that over the twenty years following Sims, lower courts that cited it to justify denying judicial review of CIA withholding were generally affirmed on appeal, regardless of whether the FOIA requester was a citizen or corporation.
