= Montana v. Blackfeet Tribe of Indians =

- Supreme Court of the United States

Decided June 3, 1985
- Full case name: Montana v. Blackfeet Tribe of Indians
- Citations: 471 U.S. 759 (more)

Holding
- States cannot tax tribes without express Congressional approval.

Court membership
- Chief Justice Warren E. Burger Associate Justices William J. Brennan Jr. · Byron White; Thurgood Marshall · Harry Blackmun; Lewis F. Powell Jr. · William Rehnquist; John P. Stevens · Sandra Day O'Connor

Case opinions
- Majority: Powell
- Dissent: White, joined by Rehnquist, Stevens

Laws applied
- Indian Mineral Leasing Act

Montana v. Blackfeet Tribe of Indians, 471 U.S. 759 (1985), was a United States Supreme Court case in which the Court held that States cannot tax tribes without express Congressional approval. The canons of construction for interpreting treaties between the United States and tribes apply to the interpretation of federal statutes.

== See also ==
- Indian Mineral Leasing Act
