= List of United States Supreme Court cases, volume 471 =

This is a list of all the United States Supreme Court cases from volume 471 of the United States Reports:

Case name	Citation	Date decided
Tennessee v. Garner	471 U.S. 1	1985
Hallie v. Eau Claire	471 U.S. 34	1985
Southern Motor Carriers Rate Conference, Inc. v. United States	471 U.S. 48	1985
Cory v. Western Oil & Gas Assn.	471 U.S. 81	1985
Spencer v. South Carolina Tax Comm'n	471 U.S. 82	1985
Board of Trustees of Scarsdale v. McCreary	471 U.S. 83	1985
United States v. Locke	471 U.S. 84	1985
United States v. Miller	471 U.S. 130	1985
Oklahoma v. Castleberry	471 U.S. 146	1985
Ramirez v. Indiana	471 U.S. 147	1985
Honig v. Students of Cal. School for Blind	471 U.S. 148	1985
Ohio v. Kentucky	471 U.S. 153	1985
Mintzes v. Buchanon	471 U.S. 154	1985
Central Intelligence Agency v. Sims	471 U.S. 159	1985
Kerr-McGee Corp. v. Navajo Tribe	471 U.S. 195	1985
Allis-Chalmers Corp. v. Lueck	471 U.S. 202	1985
Hunter v. Underwood	471 U.S. 222	1985
Webb v. Dyer County Bd. of Ed.	471 U.S. 234	1985
Wilson v. Garcia	471 U.S. 261	1985
Springfield Township School Dist. v. Knoll	471 U.S. 288	1985
Tony and Susan Alamo Foundation v. Secretary of Labor	471 U.S. 290	1985
Francis v. Franklin	471 U.S. 307	1985
Commodity Futures Trading Comm'n v. Weintraub	471 U.S. 343	1985
School Comm. of Burlington v. Department of Ed. of Mass.	471 U.S. 359	1985
United States v. Maine	471 U.S. 375	1985
Arkansas v. Mississippi	471 U.S. 377	1985
California v. Carney	471 U.S. 386	1985
Tennessee v. Street	471 U.S. 409	1985
Liparota v. United States	471 U.S. 419	1985
INS v. Rios-Pineda	471 U.S. 444	1985
United States v. Benchimol	471 U.S. 453	1985
Hopfmann v. Connolly	471 U.S. 459	1985
Burger King Corp. v. Rudzewicz	471 U.S. 462	1985
Ponte v. Real	471 U.S. 491	1985
Connecticut Dept. of Income Maintenance v. Heckler	471 U.S. 524	1985
Harper & Row v. Nation Enterprises	471 U.S. 539	1985
Black v. Romano	471 U.S. 606	1985
Zauderer v. Office of Disciplinary Counsel of Supreme Court of Ohio	471 U.S. 626	1985
Landreth Timber Co. v. Landreth	471 U.S. 681	1985
Gould v. Ruefenacht	471 U.S. 701	1985
Hillsborough County v. Automated Medical Laboratories, Inc.	471 U.S. 707	1985
Metropolitan Life Ins. Co. v. Massachusetts	471 U.S. 724	1985
Montana v. Blackfeet Tribe	471 U.S. 759	1985
Garrett v. United States	471 U.S. 773	1985
Oklahoma City v. Tuttle	471 U.S. 808	1985
National Farmers Union Ins. Cos. v. Crow Tribe	471 U.S. 845	1985
Russell v. United States	471 U.S. 858	1985
National Farmers Union Ins. Cos. v. Crow Tribe	471 U.S. 1301	1985
