= United States v. Navajo Nation =

United States v. Navajo Nation may refer to the following legal cases:

- United States v. Navajo Nation (2003), 537 U.S. 488 (2003)
- United States v. Navajo Nation (2009), 556 U.S. 287 (2009)
