= Hybrid tax credit =

Many governments offer a hybrid tax credit or hybrid tax rebate as a financial incentive for consumers to purchase a hybrid vehicle.

== Canada ==
Residents in Ontario (until July 1, 2010 when the HST takes effect, ending the previous PST rebate) and Quebec, Canada can claim a rebate on the Provincial Retail Sales Tax of up to CA$2,000 on the purchase or lease of a hybrid vehicle, and Federal Transport Canada can claim a rebate of CA$1,500.

== United States ==
The U.S. Energy Policy Act of 2005 established a federal income tax credit of up to $3,400 for the purchase of new hybrid vehicles, purchased or placed into service after December 31, 2005. Vehicles purchased after December 31, 2010 are not eligible for this credit. The law limited the tax credits to the first 60,000 eligible vehicles per carmaker, meaning that credits for popular models will be phase out before the tax break's scheduled expiration date. Note these are credits — dollar for dollar tax savings — not merely deductions. The tax credit is to be phased out two calendar quarters after the manufacturer reaches 60,000 new cars sold in the following manner: it will be reduced to 50% if delivered in either the third or fourth quarter after the threshold is reached, to 25% in the fifth and sixth quarters, and 0% thereafter. The Internal Revenue Service is responsible for certifying that certain passenger autos and light trucks qualify for the credit and the amount of the credit.

== See also ==
- Government incentives for plug-in electric vehicles
