= Sportivo =

Sportivo may refer to:

- Toyota Aurion Sportivo, a sports-oriented variant of the Toyota Aurion
- Toyota Sportivo Coupe, a concept car
