= Toyota Aurion (XV40) =

Australian mid-size car

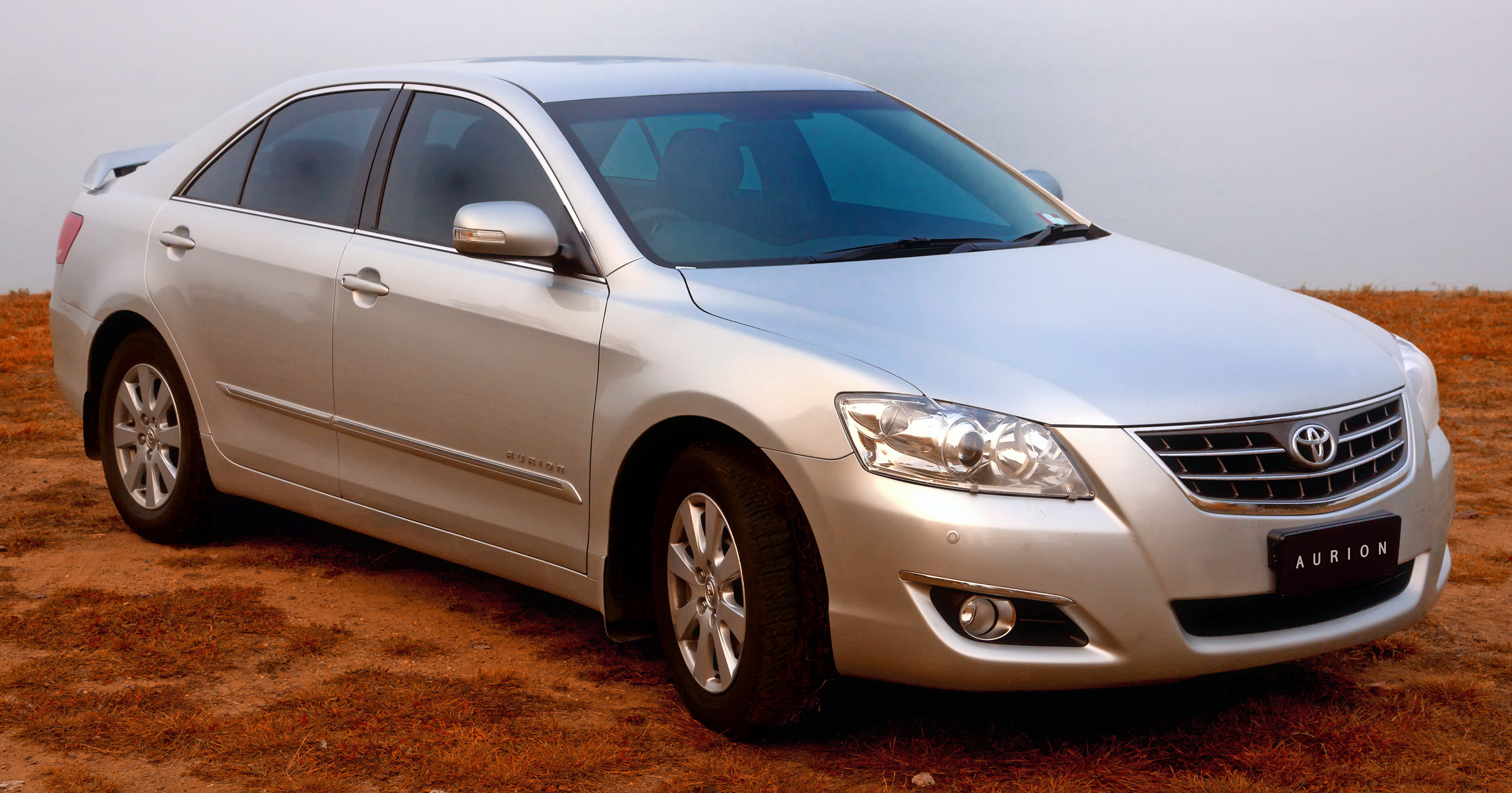

Overview
- Manufacturer: Toyota
- Also called: Toyota Camry; Toyota Camry Classical (China); TRD Aurion
- Production: May 2006 – March 2012 (Camry); October 2006 – January 2012 (Aurion)
- Model years: 2007–2012 (Australasia, Middle East, Taiwan, Southeast Asia); 2007–2013 (China)
- Assembly: Aurion: Australia: Altona; Prestige Camry: China: Guangzhou; Taiwan: Zhongli (Kuozui Motors); Thailand: Chachoengsao (TMT); Vietnam: Phúc Yên, Vĩnh Phúc
- Designer: Nicolas Hogios (2004 pre-facelift and 2009 facelift); Anthony Cheung (2009 facelift: 2007); Takafumi Ito (hybrid version: 2007)

Body and chassis
- Class: Mid-size car
- Body style: 4-door sedan
- Layout: Front-engine, front-wheel drive
- Platform: Toyota K platform
- Related: Lexus ES (XV40); Toyota Avalon (XX30); Toyota Camry (XV40); Toyota Venza (AV10)

Powertrain
- Engine: 2.0 L 1AZ-FE I4 (petrol); 2.4 L 2AZ-FE I4 (petrol); 2.4 L 2AZ-FXE I4 (petrol hybrid); 3.5 L 2GR-FE V6 (petrol); 3.5 L 2GR-FZE V6-S (petrol)
- Transmission: 6-speed manual; 4-speed U241E automatic; 5-speed U250E automatic; 6-speed U660E automatic; CVT P311 automatic

Dimensions
- Wheelbase: 2,775 mm (109.3 in)
- Length: 4,825 mm (190.0 in)
- Width: 1,820 mm (71.7 in)
- Height: 1,470 mm (57.9 in)
- Curb weight: 1,590–1,630 kg (3,505–3,594 lb)

Chronology
- Predecessor: Toyota Avalon (XX10) (Australasia); Toyota Camry (XV30) (Asia)
- Successor: Toyota Aurion (XV50) (Australasia); Toyota Camry (XV50) (prestige, for Asia)

The Toyota Aurion (XV40) /ˈɔːriən/ is the original series of the Toyota Aurion, a mid-size car produced by Toyota in Australia and parts of Asia. Designated "XV40", Toyota manufactured the first generation Aurion between 2006 and 2012 until it was fully replaced by the XV50 series. While Asian production of the XV50 series began in late 2011, Toyota's Australian operations did not take on production of the new model until 2012.

Although marketed as a separate model, the XV40 series Aurion is essentially a Toyota Camry (XV40) with revised front- and rear-end treatment, along with changes to the interior and Australian tuned suspension. In lieu of the "Aurion" nameplate, the majority of East and Southeast Asian markets received the Camry-based Aurion under the name Toyota Camry. However, in Australasia and the Middle East, Toyota sold the original version of the Camry alongside the Aurion. In these markets, the Aurion replaced the Avalon (XX10) model, which could trace its roots back to 1994 in North America.

In the Australasian and Middle Eastern markets, to further differentiate the Aurion from its Camry sibling, Toyota equipped the Aurion exclusively with a 3.5-litre V6 engine. With the Camry, the company only offered the 2.4-litre four-cylinder version. Previously in these markets, prior to the introduction of the Camry XV40, Toyota had offered both four- and a six-cylinder powerplants. The powertrains used in the Asian specification Camry vary slightly from those of the Aurion. As well as the 3.5-litre V6, two four-cylinder engines are offered in either 2.0- or a 2.4-litre form for the Asian markets. These engines are teamed with a six-, four- and five-speed automatic transmissions, respectively.

Along with the naturally aspirated version, Toyota produced an Australia-only supercharged TRD Aurion between 2007 and 2009 as tuned by Toyota Racing Development (TRD). At its release, Toyota claimed this performance variant to be the world's most powerful front-wheel drive car.

== History of development ==
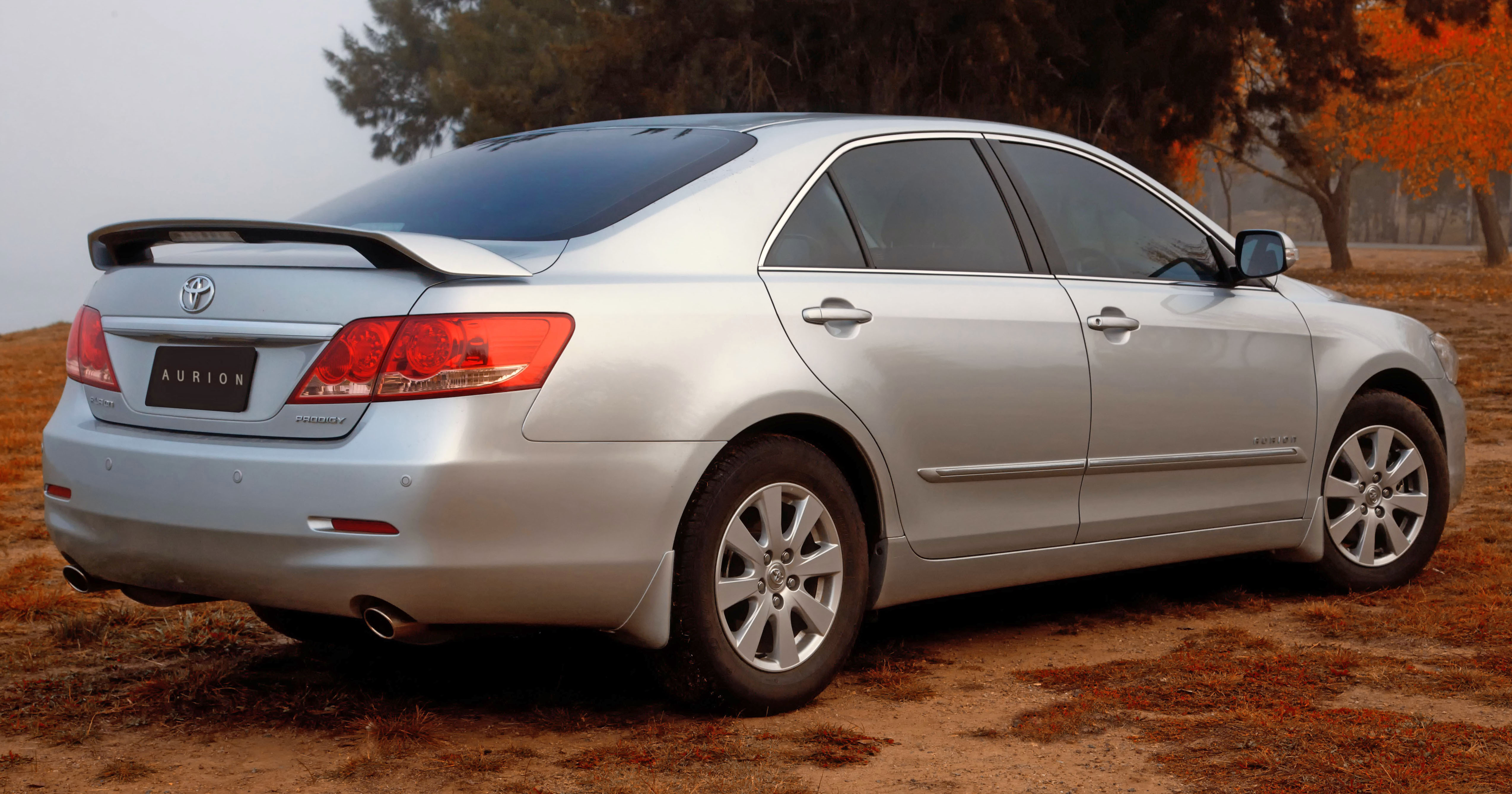
Pre-facelift Toyota Aurion Prodigy rear

On 9 February 2006, Toyota Australia unveiled the Aurion alongside the Aurion Sportivo concept at the Melbourne International Motor Show at an official press conference. Toyota dropped the Avalon tag for their new large car, as it had gained a reputation to be an uninspiring car, both in the flesh and to drive. Toyota made use of the "Aurion" name to give the car a fresh start. Aurion means "tomorrow" in Ancient Greek, and Aurora translates to "the dawn" in Latin. The name was chosen after consumer research on more than 30 potential names. This gives implications of a completely new car and ties in with Toyota's advertising slogan, "Can't wait for tomorrow". Before commencing production of the Aurion, Toyota Australia manufactured the full-size Avalon model at its Altona plant in Melbourne until June 2005. Production of the Avalon had begun in 2000, taking much of its basic design and mechanical features from the then six-year-old Avalon model sold in North America. The Avalon was offered as a larger, more upmarket car than the Toyota Camry, which it was built alongside. The original sales predictions were not met, with the Avalon failing to challenge rivals such as the Holden Commodore and the Ford Falcon. The reasoning behind this has been widely attributed to the Avalon's older design and styling, which has been widely described as "bland", as well as the front-wheel drive configuration and smaller engine displacement. In its best year, the Avalon only managed to reach half of Toyota's projected sales target, with many potential buyers opting for the slightly smaller sized V6 Camry, featuring the same engine as the Avalon.

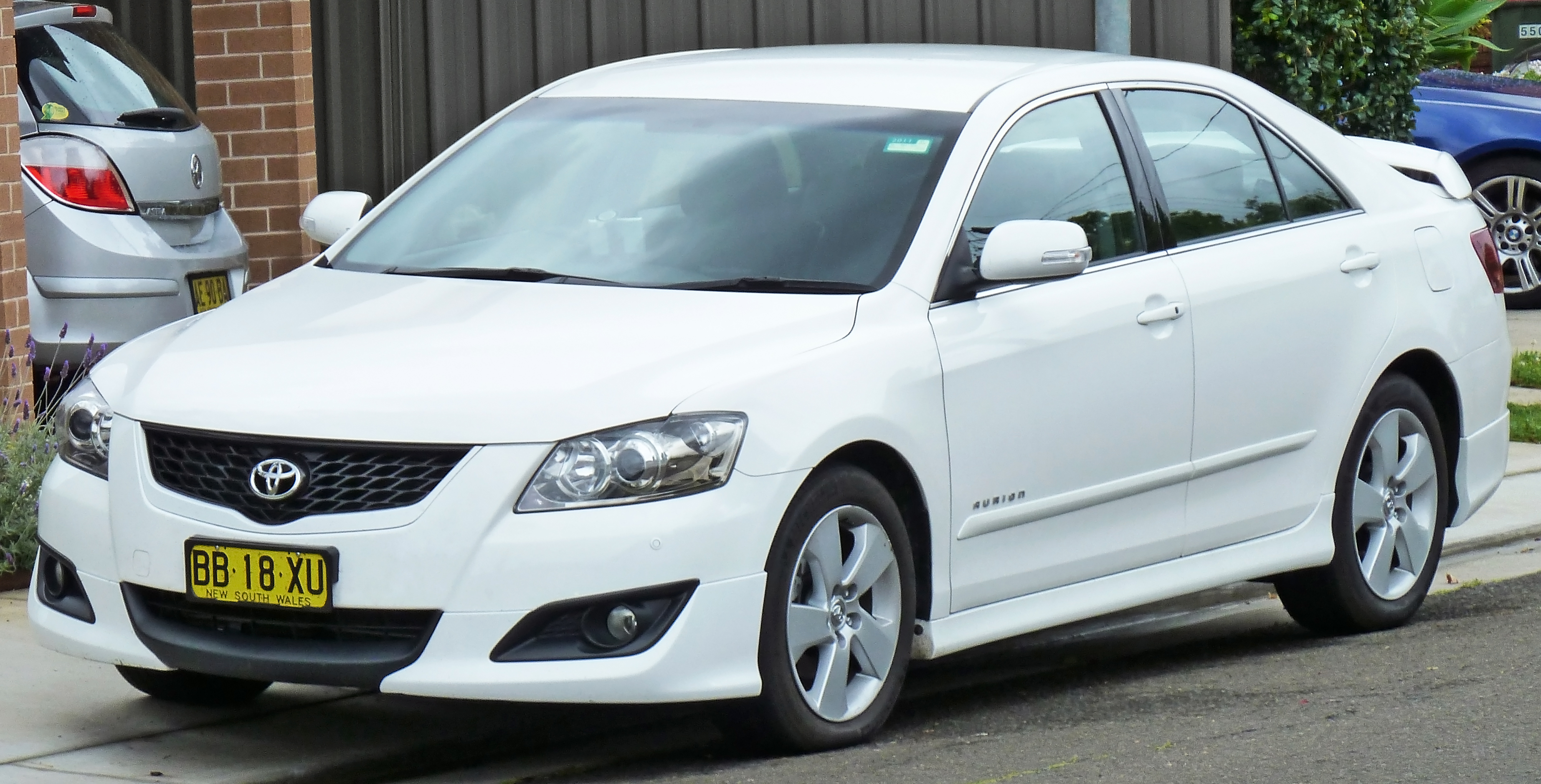
Pre-facelift Toyota Aurion Sportivo ZR6. An alternative grille insert and body kit distinguishes the sports variants of the Aurion from the comfort-oriented trim levels.

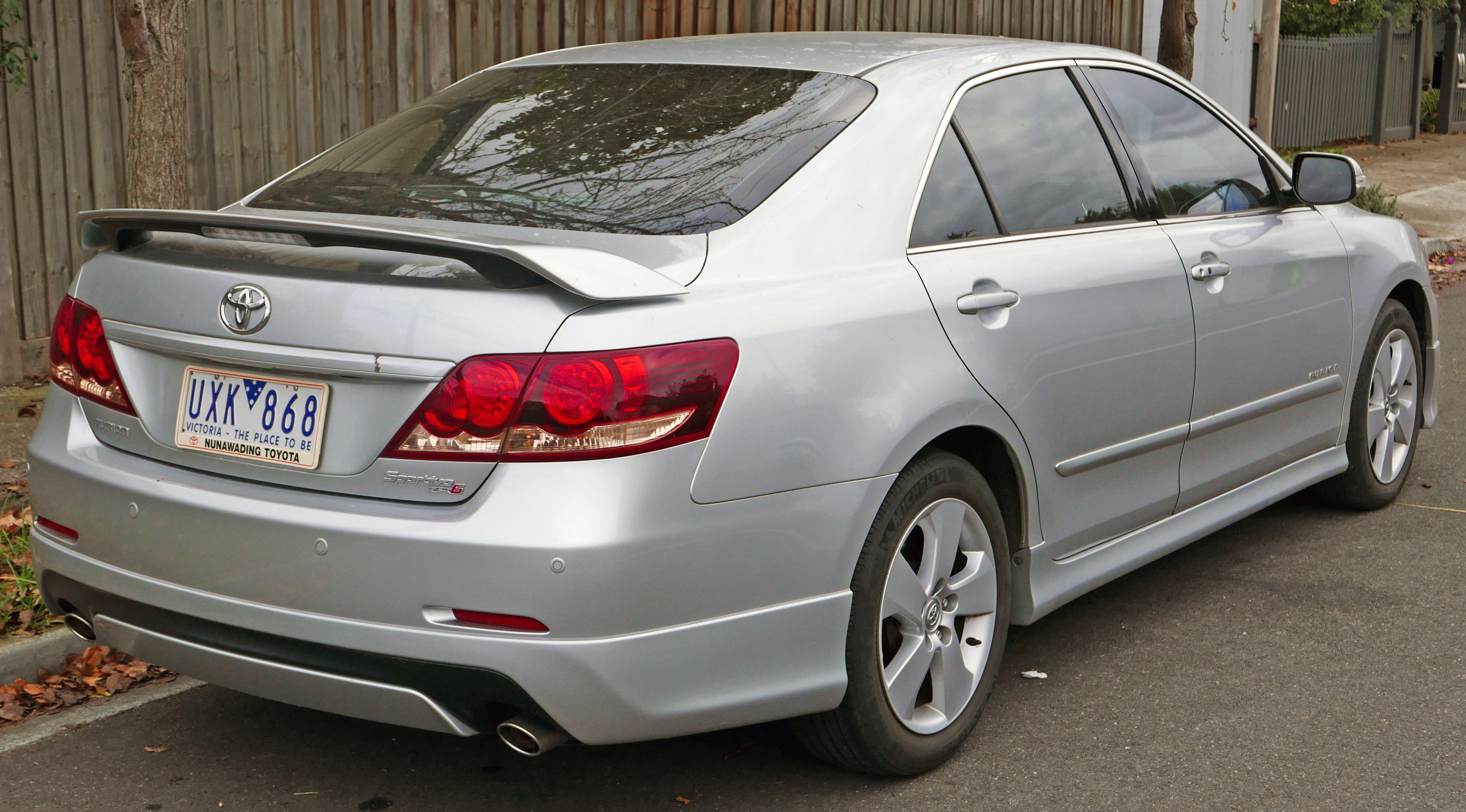
Pre-facelift Toyota Aurion Sportivo ZR6 rear

Toyota, discovering that the Australian public wanted something that was modern and designed with consideration to the Australian market, began full-scale planning work on its Avalon replacement in 2002. Toyota Australia realised that no other model being developed at the time for Japan or North America was going to be suitable, and due to the size limitations of the Australian market, a completely indigenous model was unrealisable. However, at that time, Toyota Australia did not have any designers of its own. As a result, the company recruited Paul Beranger in August 2002 to set up Toyota Style Australia (TSA) in an industrial complex located in Dingley Village, Victoria. TSA first developed the X-Runner and Sportivo Coupe concepts, and in 2003, Nick Hogios, who had previously worked for Ford Australia on designing the XR performance models of the BA Falcon, was appointed chief designer. TSA's next venture was more significant—a privately developed model based on the Camry XV30—a car that signalled the beginning of the Aurion programme. Codenamed "380L" and developed during the course of 2003, this one-off model was forged by stripping panels and interior components from the donor Camry, and substituting these for TSA-developed versions. Total cost was approximately A$1 million. Focus groups conducted by Toyota in early 2003 had ranked the Avalon at the bottom of the list when compared to the competing Holden Commodore, Ford Falcon and Mitsubishi Magna. Later on in the year, the same focus groups were called back and the Avalon was exchanged for the 380L. Overall, the groups ranked the Toyota as their first preference, and according to Beranger, "didn't see the car as a Camry". As such, Toyota Australia deduced that if the 380L was available for purchase there and then, they could sell it alongside the regular Camry as a six-cylinder car under a different name.

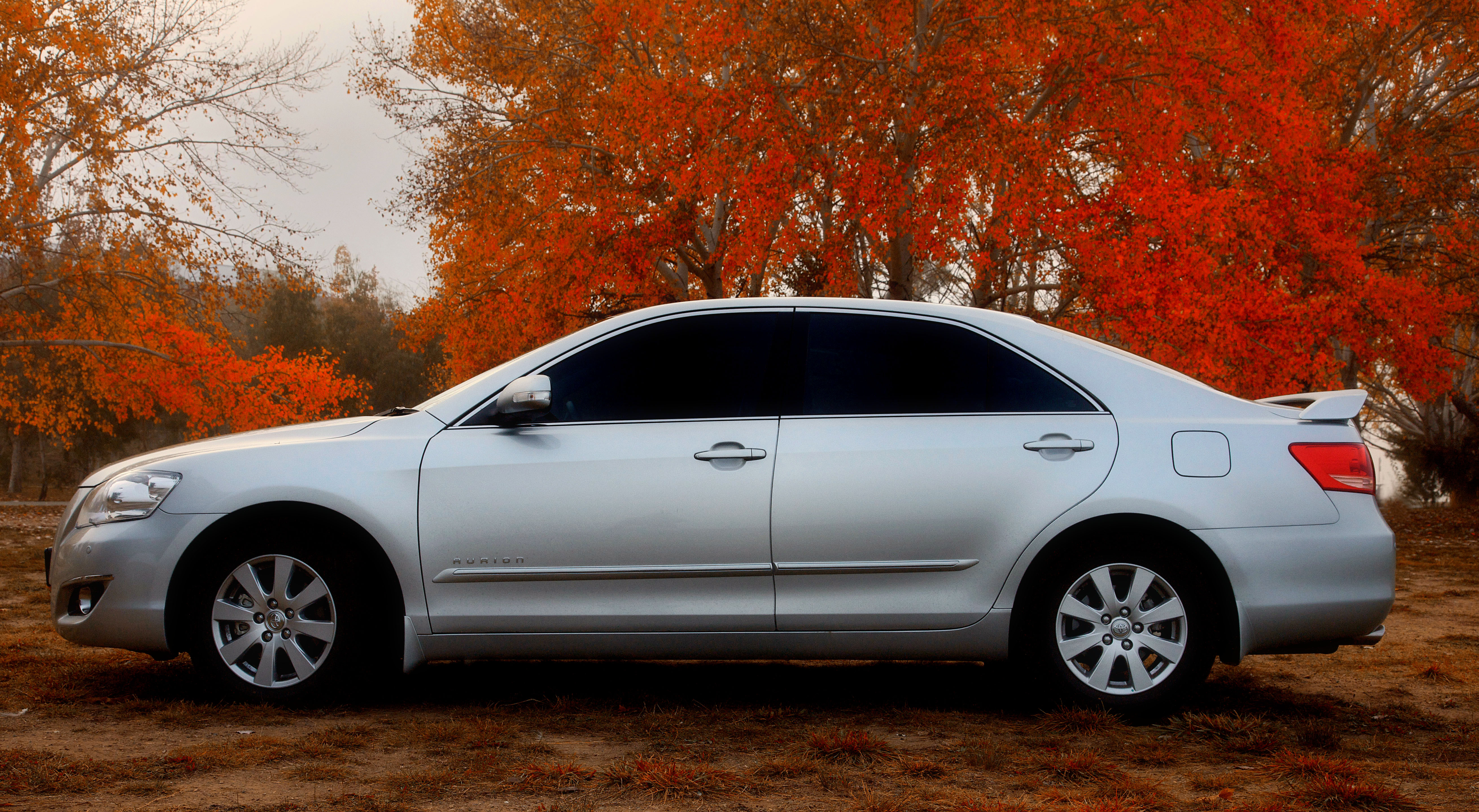
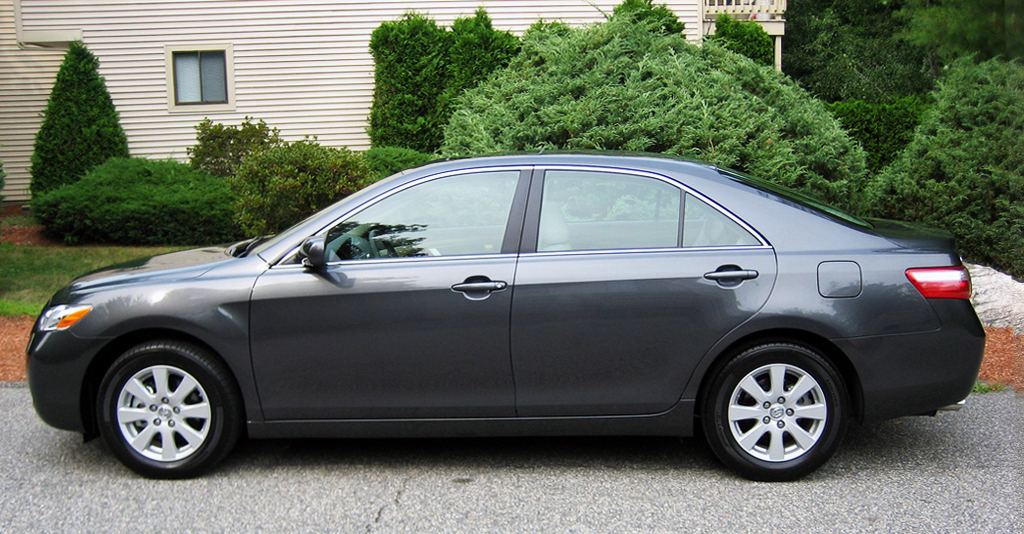
Aurion (top) shares its roof, windows, doors and side panels (excluding front fenders) with the donor Camry model (bottom).

During the 380L development, TSA had regular discussions with Toyota Japan on how its Avalon replacement would eventually turn out. Because TSA were an unknown quantity, having never designed a production vehicle, it took the division some time to convince Japan that they could indeed design a car themselves. When the 380L was consigned to a presentation with Japanese Toyota officials, TSA's lead designer Nick Hogios was requested to tender a proposal for the next-generation "042L" Camry design competition. While his submission was not chosen, Hogios was summoned to work on what would become the Aurion, then exclusively referred to as the "Asian" or "prestige" Camry, and codenamed "043L". Due to the success of TSA's earlier concepts and the 380L, Toyota Australia was given the authorisation to manufacture both the regular 042L and 043L Camrys and sell them side by side. In Australia, however, the regular Camry was to be limited to the four-cylinder engine, and the prestige Camry (later to become the Aurion) to the six. Hogios worked in Japan for nine months during 2004 designing the prestige Camry, and his final design was a collaborative effort between Japanese and Taiwanese designers, but the car's front-end styling is largely Hogios's own work. While the work in Japan was being undertaken, TSA began to make changes for the Australian Aurion variants. After the design stage was completed, Toyota Australia then commenced work on the development of the car, concurrently developing both the Australian car and the version for Asia. Beranger proclaims that the entire engineering undertaking, "is probably one of the most significant jobs that any subsidiary of Toyota Japan has done anywhere in the world." The Australian variant of the car was codenamed "323L". Despite both cars being essentially identical, Australia was given a different code due to the car occupying a broader range in that market—from a fleet vehicle to a sports-oriented model. In Asia, the car's role is much narrower, being a high-end luxury car. The first Aurion-based Camry rolled off the assembly line in China in May 2006.

=== Design ===
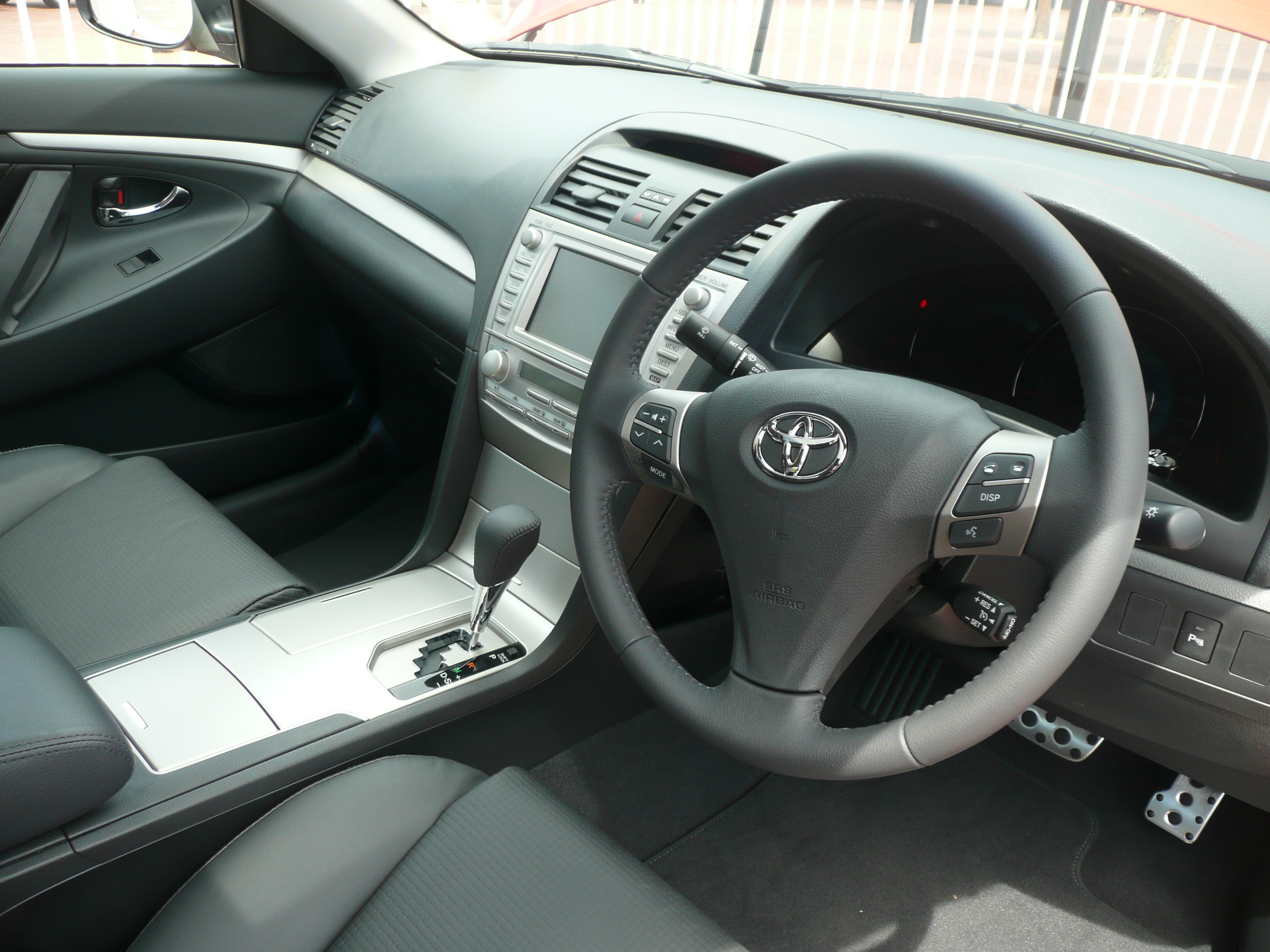
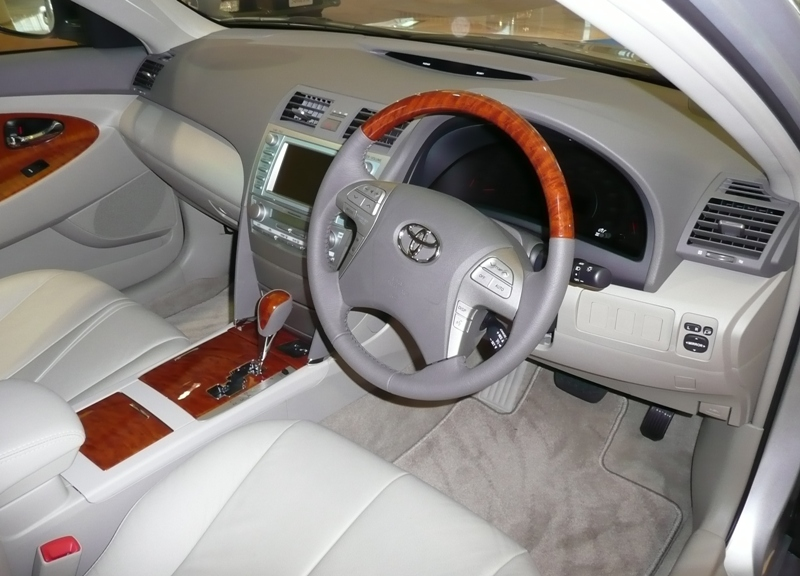
Aurion (top) shares a common interior with the Toyota Camry (bottom). The upper portion of the dashboard and centre console are unique to each car. In the Middle East, the Aurion shares its dashboard with the regular Camry.

Aurion takes its doors, windows, roof panels, body sides (except front quarters) from the Camry XV40. However, the other panels are unique from the regular Camry. This component sharing also means that Aurion has the same wheelbase, front and rear axle tracks, and interior dimensions. Interior design also largely parallels the Camry. Notable differences include the redesigned upper dashboard portion and restyled centre console, plus the substitution of the Australian Camry's hand-operated parking brake with a foot-operated equivalent (as shared with the Camry for Japan and North America). The reasoning behind this component sharing strategy was to reduce costs and to allow the car to be built alongside the Camry, thus simplifying the manufacturing process.

Toyota claims that the Aurion is designed to Australian tastes, although it has been designed with markets such as Asia in mind. Hogios states that the Aurion follows the traits of current Australian styling, with a tendency to look towards European designs for inspiration. In addition, like its other vehicles of similar vintage, Toyota designed the Aurion within the realm of its "vibrant clarity" design language. According to chief designer Hogios, the car makes particular use of the "vibrant clarity" theory known as "perfect imbalance". This involves body features that act as a counterpoint to other body features. Examples of this include intersecting concave and convex surfaces and vertical sculpted features on the front fascia, which are balanced by the horizontal headlamps. The front-end's "double concave architecture" can also be characterised by its protruding bonnet crease line and deep grille. The same architecture is applied at the rear, with a deep bumper, a clamshell-shaped boot lid that envelops over the flanks, dual exhaust pipes and tail lamps. Design patents were filed on 27 December 2005 at the United States Patent and Trademark Office.

For certain markets like China, where Camry sits right below similar-sized Mercedes-Benz cars as a luxury model, it is important for the Aurion to exemplify the traits of such vehicles. With the development of the Aurion, designers produced two separate philosophies, each pitched at a specific niche of the market. The base model AT-X, and luxury Prodigy and Presara variants employ the comfort design, with the more aggressive sports-oriented style found on the Sportivo versions. To meet this requirement, the Sportivo variants feature unique 17-inch alloy wheels, a rear spoiler, body kit appendages and a three-spoke steering wheel. The high-performance TRD models offer a similar sports-oriented design, but are distinguishable by the use of unique body parts. These include a redesigned Formula One-inspired front bumper, with integrated foglamps, a unique rear bumper with fixed tailpipes.

=== Facelift ===
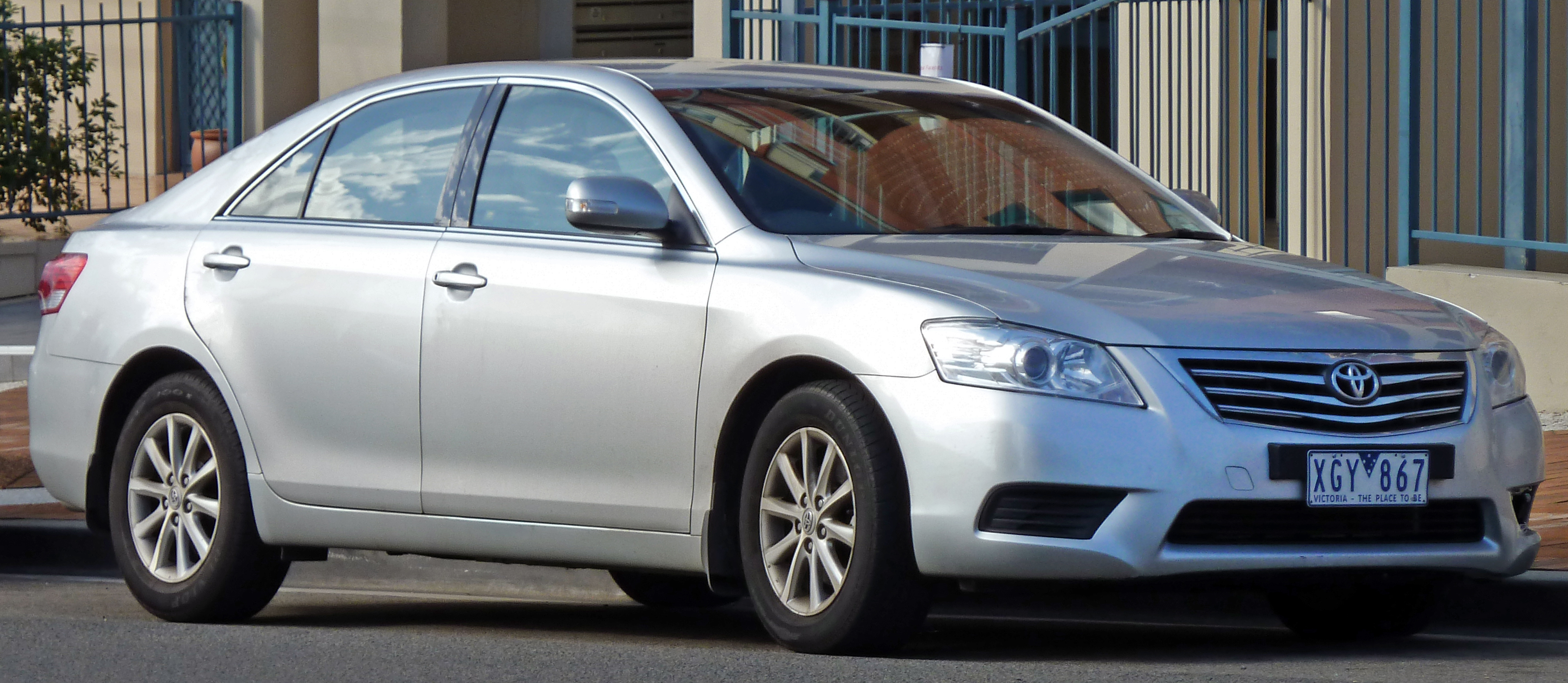
Facelift Toyota Aurion AT-X front

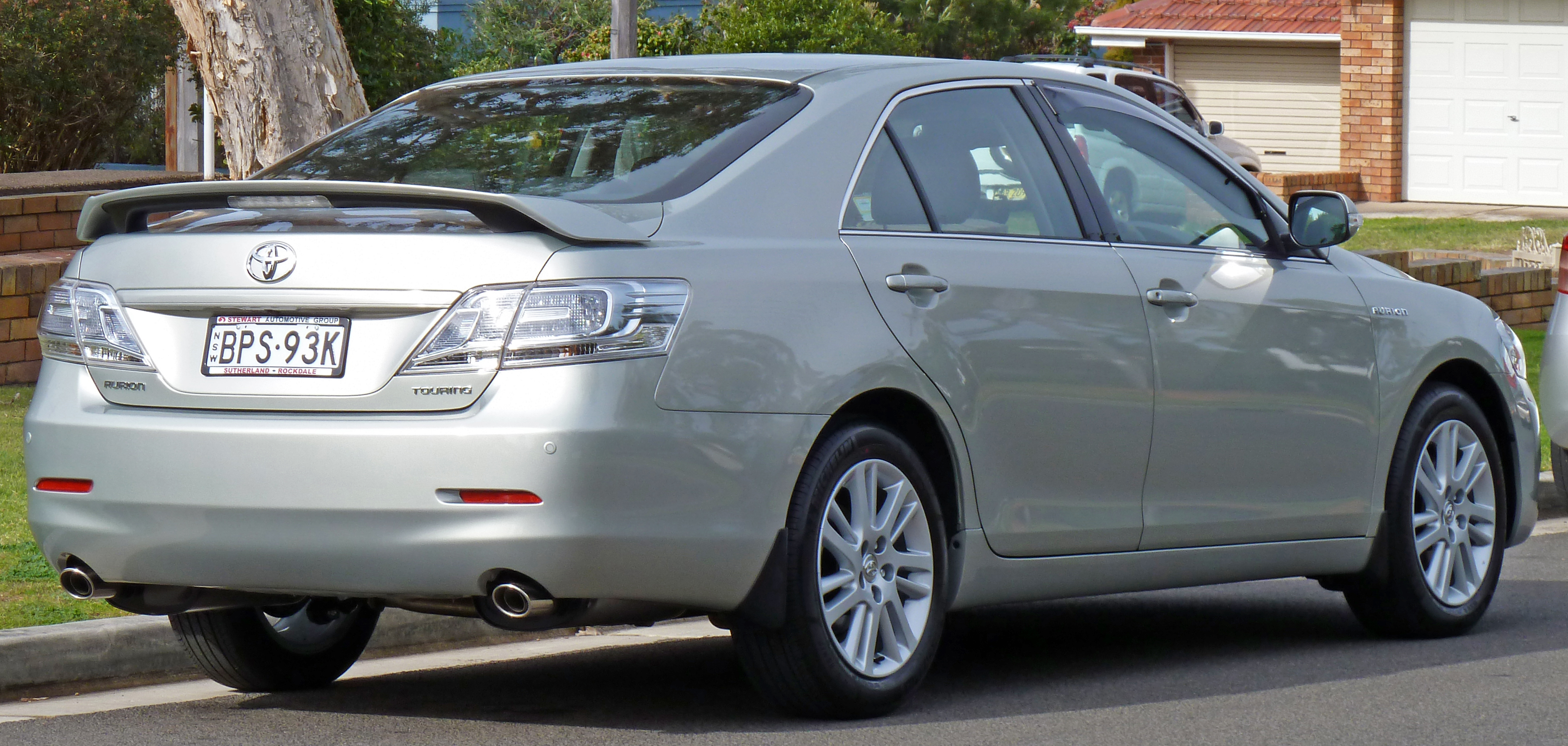
Facelift Toyota Aurion Touring rear

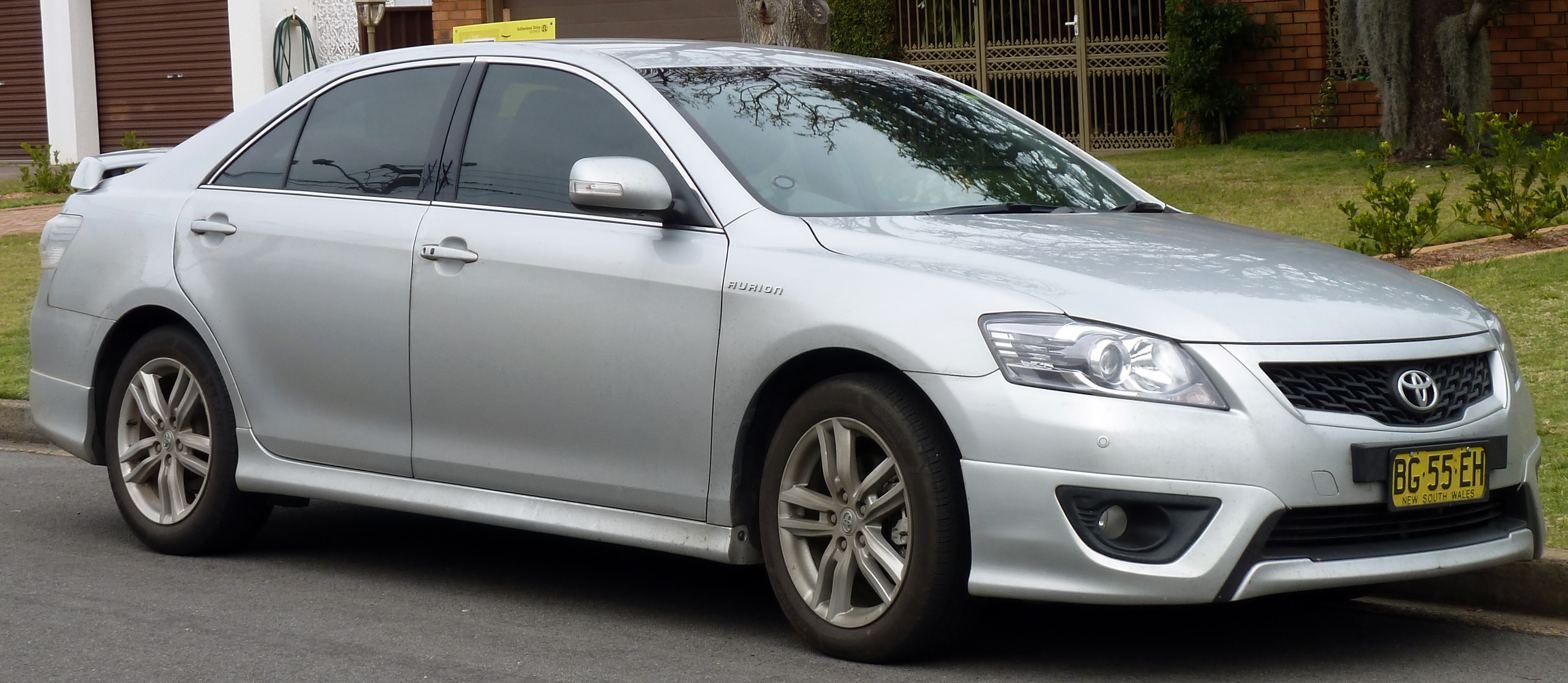
Facelift Toyota Aurion Sportivo ZR6 front

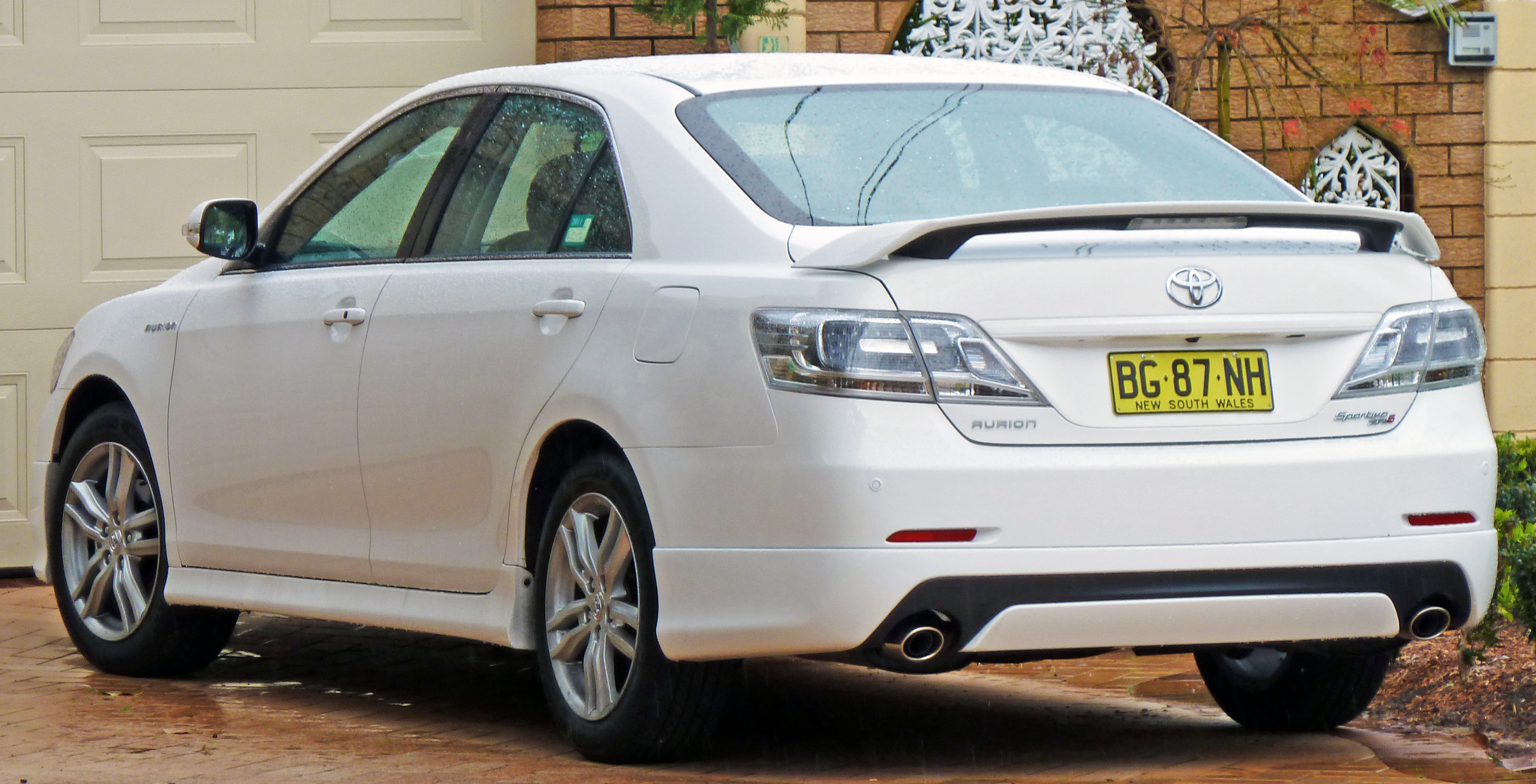
Facelift Toyota Aurion Sportivo ZR6 rear

Toyota of Thailand unveiled a reworked version of the East and Southeast Asian-market Camry in June 2009 equipped with a hybrid drivetrain. The revised Aurion-based Camry previewed the Australian Aurion's then upcoming facelift. The updated car features new headlamp and taillamp lens clusters with integrated foglamps, along with a redesigned front bumper, grille insert, and revised interior trim details. The revised Aurion was designed by Australian chief designer Nick Hogios, who also designed the original Aurion, and Anthony Cheung, assistant project manager from Thailand, during 2007. The hybrid version was also designed by Takafumi Ito, who also designed the facelifted regular Camry. The design registrations for the facelifted hybrid version, nothing changes made to the original were filed on 19 December 2008 at the US Patent and Trademark Office. Toyota Australia later revealed the updated car as its Aurion on 21 September. While the front-end of the original Aurion was designed with a "double-concave" architecture, the revised version abandons this for an "X-Form" design philosophy, characterised by a lower and wider trapezoidal shaped grille.

Like the original version, the Aurion continues to offer differing frontal design treatments across the range. From side, the rehashed design is identified by the deletion of bodyside moulding strips and a range of new wheels designs, including the standard fitment of alloy wheels on the base-line AT-X. Interior upgrades in the form of new colour combinations are featured, along with upgraded instruments and gauges giving greater turn signal and warning-signal clarity. Revised audio systems, lighting and in-cabin storage are also featured. Prodigy and Presara versions receive a new "linear satin" wood grain finish.

=== Safety ===
Safety was a key aspect in the development of the Aurion. All safety features are standard across the entire range and there are no optional safety devices. Features such as dual front, side and curtain airbags, traction control, brake assist, electronic brakeforce distribution and Vehicle Stability Control come standard. In tests conducted by Australasian New Car Assessment Program (ANCAP), the base model scored a four-star rating, with 30.03 out of 37 points. Toyota caused controversy by not providing a third test vehicle for ANCAP to use for the optional "side-pole impact test". This third test, allows tested vehicles to be eligible for a five-star rating if the initial score is high enough. Toyota cited the additional expense of A$75,000–$100,000 including the car as being unjustifiable, and that they did not agree with the nature of the pole test. The scores given without the optional test indicate that the maximum two points that could have been earned would have been slightly less than needed to give the Aurion a five-star rating anyway. Due to Toyota's decision to fit a driver and front passenger seat belt reminder, along with their decision to fund the optional pole test, the Aurion's safety rating was upgraded to a full five stars from August 2009 production, with a score of 33.03 out of 37.

ANCAP test results* Toyota Aurion AT-X (2007)
Test	Score
Overall	4 /5 stars
Frontal offset	13.59/16
Side impact	15.44/16
Pole	Not Assessed
Seat belt reminders	1/3
Whiplash protection	Not Assessed
Pedestrian protection	Poor
Electronic stability control	Standard

ANCAP test results* Toyota Aurion all variants (2009)
Test	Score
Overall	5 /5 stars
Frontal offset	13.59/16
Side impact	15.44/16
Pole	Not Assessed
Seat belt reminders	2/3
Whiplash protection	Not Assessed
Pedestrian protection	Poor
Electronic stability control	Standard

== Powertrains ==
The Aurion employs a version of Toyota's 2GR-FE V6 engine that also powers the V6 Camry outside of Australasia. With an engine displacement of 3.5-litres, the 2GR-FE engine is capable of outputting 200 kW (268 hp) and 336 N⋅m (248 lb⋅ft) of torque. Power rises by 4 kW (5 hp) with the use of 95 RON "premium" unleaded petrol. Acceleration figures for the car have been recorded at 7.4 seconds from standstill to 100 km/h (62 mph), and Toyota claims a top speed of 228 km/h (142 mph). The Aurion, which is Euro IV emissions compliant, is rated at 9.9 L/100 km (23.8 mpg_{‑US}) under the Australian ADR 81/01 fuel consumption test. The dual VVT-i 3.5-litre 2GR-FE engine paired to Toyota's six-speed U660E automatic transmission. This same transmission is also utilised by the supercharged TRD variants. These produce 241 kW (323 hp) and 400 N⋅m (295 lb⋅ft), combined with a combined fuel consumption of 10.9 L/100 km (21.6 mpg_{‑US}).

In some Asian countries where the Aurion is sold as the Toyota Camry, both 2.0- and 2.4-litre powerplants are offered. The naturally aspirated 3.5-litre engine is also available in some of these markets. The 2.0-litre 1AZ-FE inline-four has a maximum output of 108 kW (145 hp) of power and 190 N⋅m (140 lb⋅ft) of torque. These figures rise to 127 kW (170 hp) and 224 N⋅m (165 lb⋅ft) when the 2.4-litre 2AZ-FE unit is fitted. Of the two four-cylinder motors, the latter is teamed with Toyota's five-speed U250E automatic, with the U241E four-speed unit reserved for the 2.0-litre model. From c. 2009, Toyota began offering a new 2.0-litre 3ZR-FE inline-four petrol engine in some markets. Producing 102 kW (137 hp) and 189 N⋅m (139 lb⋅ft), the 3ZR-FE was available with the four-speed U241E automatic, or in some markets with a six-speed manual.

Chassis	Model	Engine	Power	Torque	Transmission
XV40	ZSV40	2.0 L 3ZR-FE inline-four (petrol)	102 kW (137 hp) (SAE)	189 N⋅m (139 lb⋅ft)	6-speed manual 4-speed U241E automatic
XV40	ACV41	2.0 L 1AZ-FE inline-four (petrol)	100 kW (134 hp) (SAE); 108 kW (145 hp)	190 N⋅m (140 lb⋅ft)	4-speed U241E automatic
XV40	ACV40	2.4 L 2AZ-FE inline-four (petrol)	127 kW (170 hp)	224 N⋅m (165 lb⋅ft)	5-speed U250E automatic
XV40	AHV40	2.4 L 2AZ-FXE inline-four (petrol hybrid)	140 kW (188 hp)	See text	CVT P311 automatic
XV40	GSV40	3.5 L 2GR-FE V6 (petrol)	200 kW (268 hp)	336 N⋅m (248 lb⋅ft)	6-speed U660E automatic
XV40	GSV40	3.5 L 2GR-FZE V6 supercharged (petrol)	241 kW (323 hp)	400 N⋅m (295 lb⋅ft)	6-speed U660E automatic

== Regions ==
=== Australasia ===
Toyota launched the Aurion in Australasia, where it competes with the rear-wheel drive Ford Falcon, Holden Commodore, and the now discontinued front-wheel drive Mitsubishi 380. The TRD variants were pitched to compete with the Subaru Liberty GT and Mazda 6 MPS. Since its introduction, the Aurion has received numerous awards and positive reviews. In particular, the car has been praised for its good performance mated with comparatively low fuel consumption, and the inclusion of safety and comfort features that are optional on competitor vehicles.

Prior to its introduction, a target of 24,000 annualised sales were predicted for the Australian market, double that of the Avalon's eventual sales rate. A further 8,000 vehicles were forecast to be sent abroad to the Middle East and New Zealand. Starting from 2007, Toyota received a contract to deliver 10,000 export Aurions to the Middle East.

The Aurion was also judged best large car in the Drive Car of the Year competition for both 2006, 2007 and 2009.

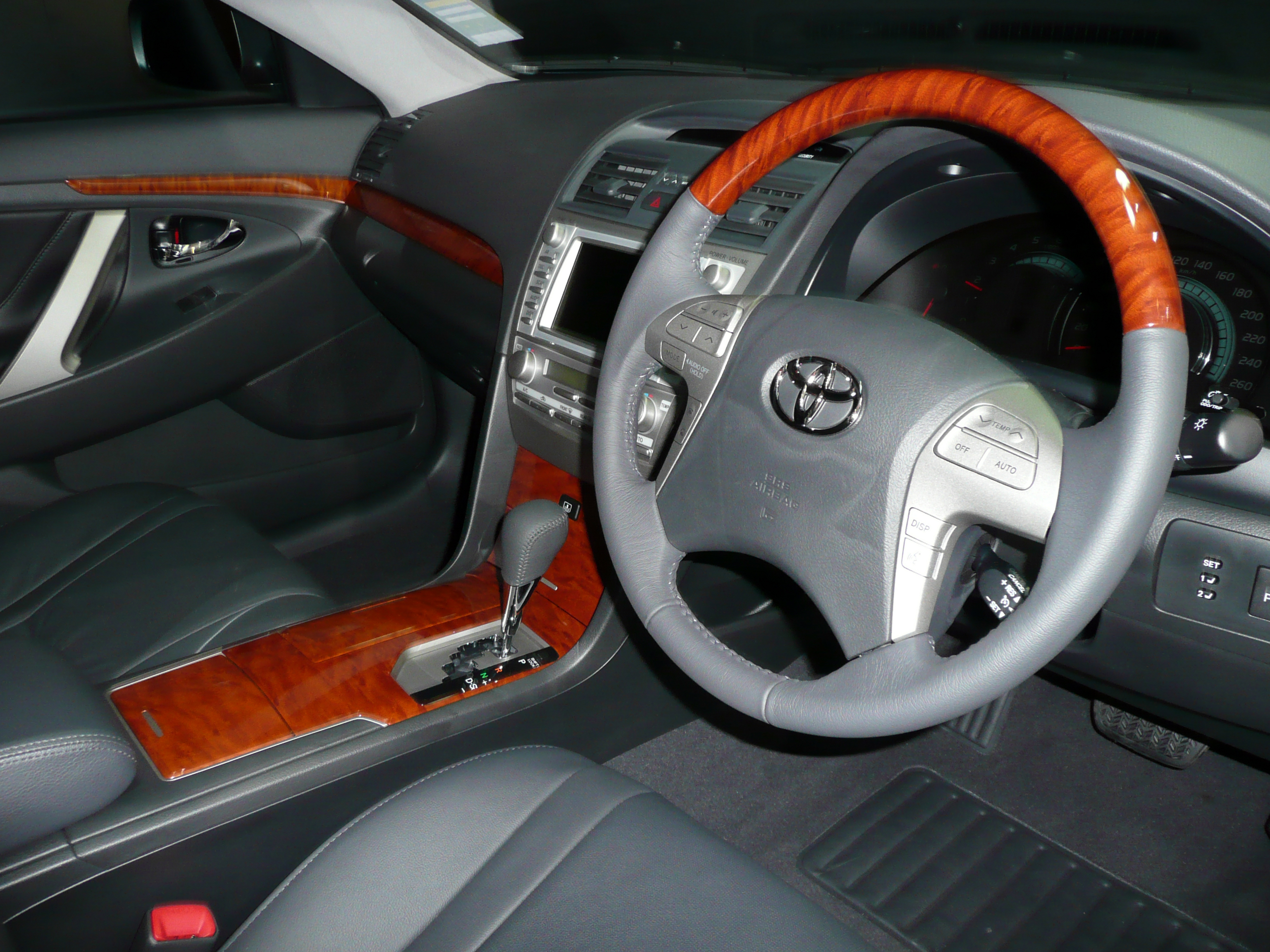
Toyota Aurion Presara interior

Specification levels

- AT-X: Marketed primarily towards fleet buyers, the entry-level AT-X features air conditioning, power windows and mirrors, among others. The Aurion AT-X was awarded the Australia's Best Large Car award in 2006 and 2007; judges described the Aurion as "...a terrific well-rounded package of technology and refinement. Toyota has produced a big six that has continued to outstrip traditional rivals in the Australian market."
- Sportivo: Available in two trim levels for the Australian market, the Sportivo is the Aurion's sports oriented variant. The introductory Sportivo SX6 features a specially designed sports body kit, sports suspension, sports seats and 17-inch alloy wheels and tinted sports headlights. The Sportivo ZR6 also shares the same "Sportivo" exterior design, but is specified high, with electrically adjustable leather sports seats, parking sensors and dual-zone climate control air conditioning.
- Prodigy: Building onto what the AT-X offers, the semi-luxury Prodigy, branded the Touring in New Zealand and the Middle East, features an electrically adjustable driver's seat, dual-zone climate control air conditioning, parking sensors, wood grain interior and full leather upholstery. The Prodigy also sees a chrome grille, and 16-inch alloy wheels along with front fog lamps as standard.
- Presara: the luxury-oriented Presara features a lavishly appointed interior with features such as electric seats with a two-memory setting, a moonroof, push-start engine operation, a reversing camera, and satellite navigation. The Presara, marketed under the Grande moniker in New Zealand and the Middle East, also features high-intensity discharge headlamps with auto levelling front lighting system. When reversing, the side mirrors face down towards the ground (unless the mirror adjustment switch is in the off position) to assist the driver when parking in places where space is compromised.

Toyota Australia released the special edition "Touring SE" in October 2007, based on the AT-X. Features gained over the AT-X comprised 16-inch alloy wheels, a rear spoiler, six CD stacker, a trip computer, dual zone climate control air-conditioning and a leather steering wheel and selection lever. Front and rear parking sensors, and dual-zone air conditioning were also fitted. The Touring SE was reintroduced in identical form in April 2008, again in October 2008, and then finally in April 2009. These 2009 versions differed slightly, with 17- in lieu of 16-inch wheels, the Sportivo grille, and sports front and rear lights. The price remains unchanged from the 2007 original. At the same time, a Touring SE variant of the Camry sedan was released with similar upgrades.

In 2011, a special edition of the Aurion, called the "White Limited Edition" was released with only 250 built. The model is based on the Prodigy, however, features a unique exterior and interior combination. The White LE is painted white and has unique alloy wheels, similar to those found on the Australian version Camry Grande. The bodykit is from the Sportivo viarants and the model has unique badging. The interior is a mixture of black and off-white on the leather seats and interior panels.

=== Asia ===
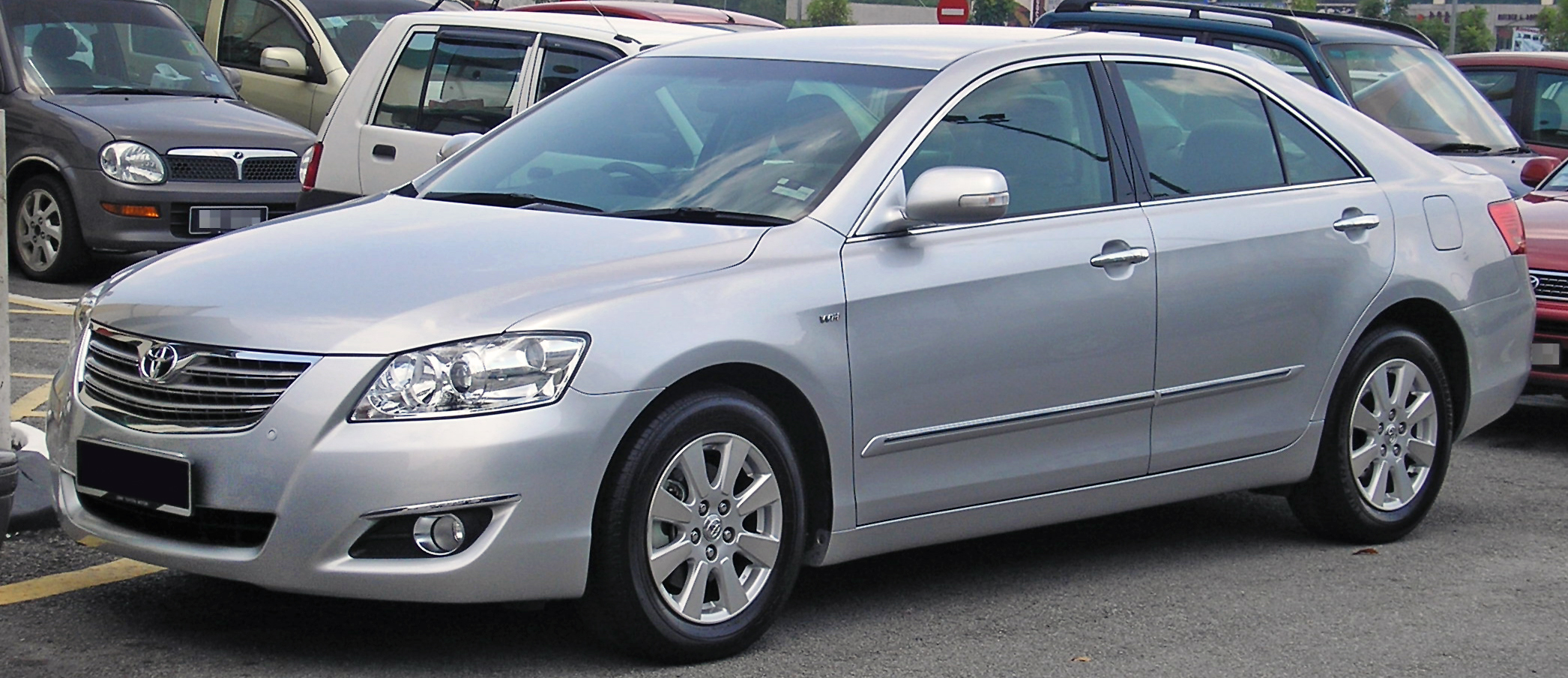
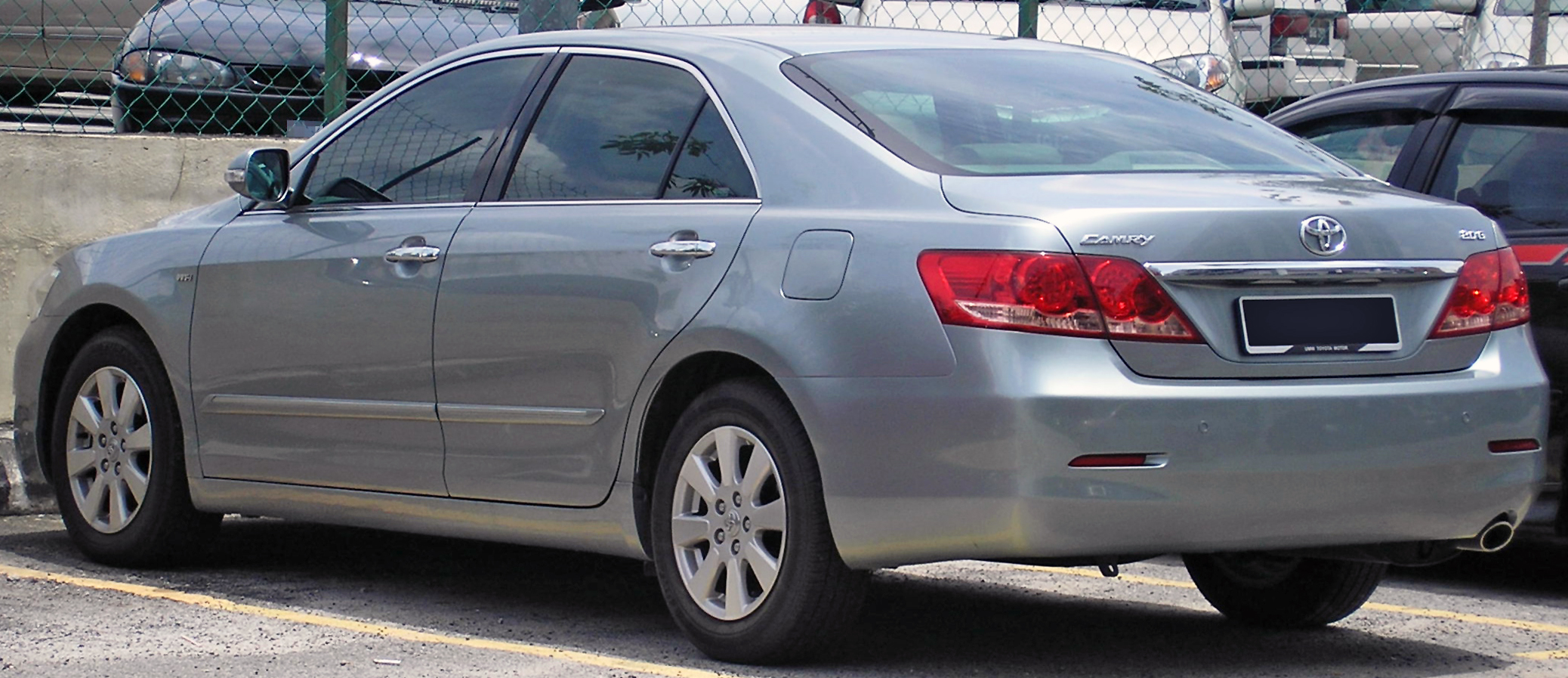
Pre-facelift Toyota Camry (Malaysia)
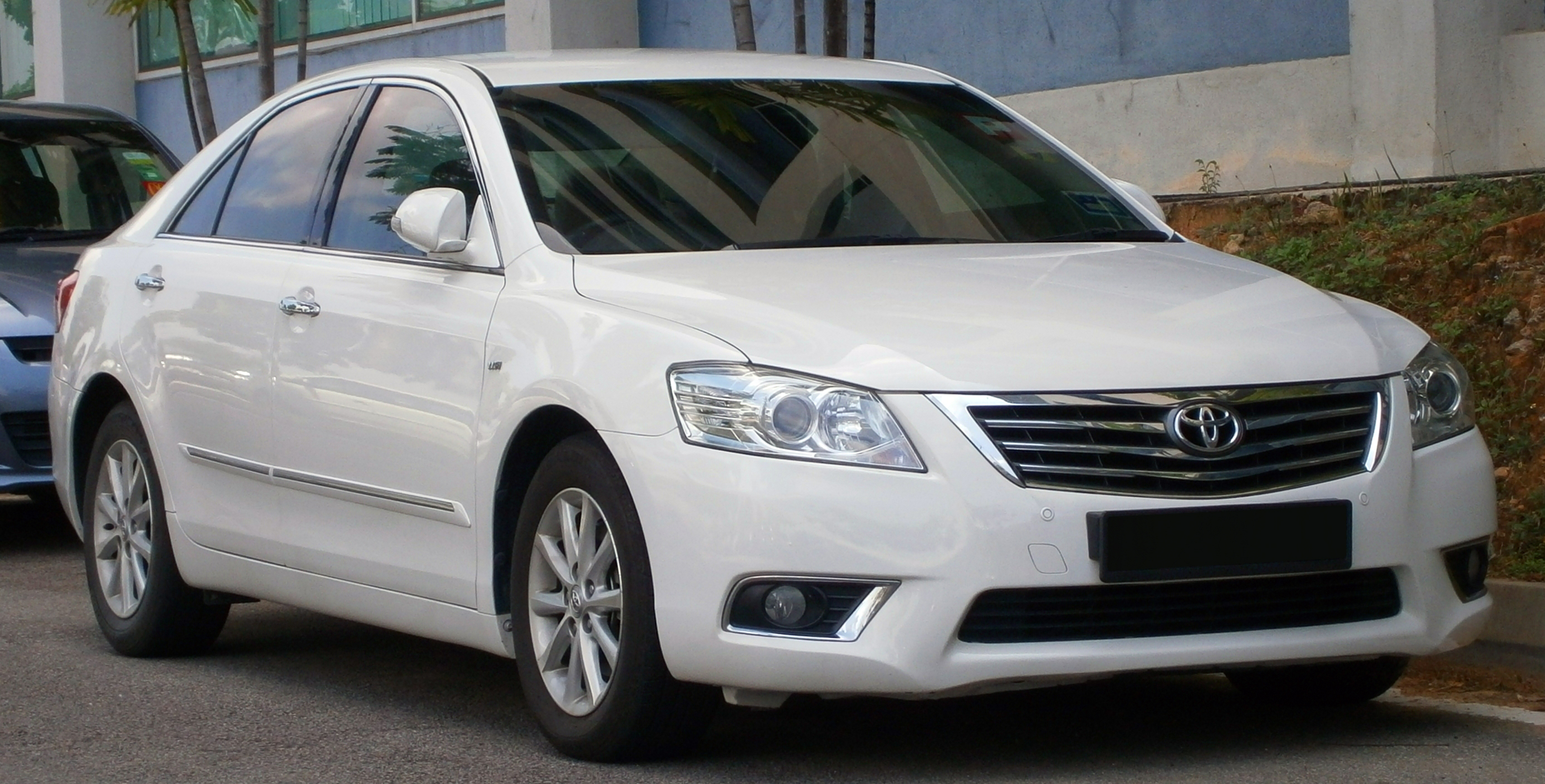
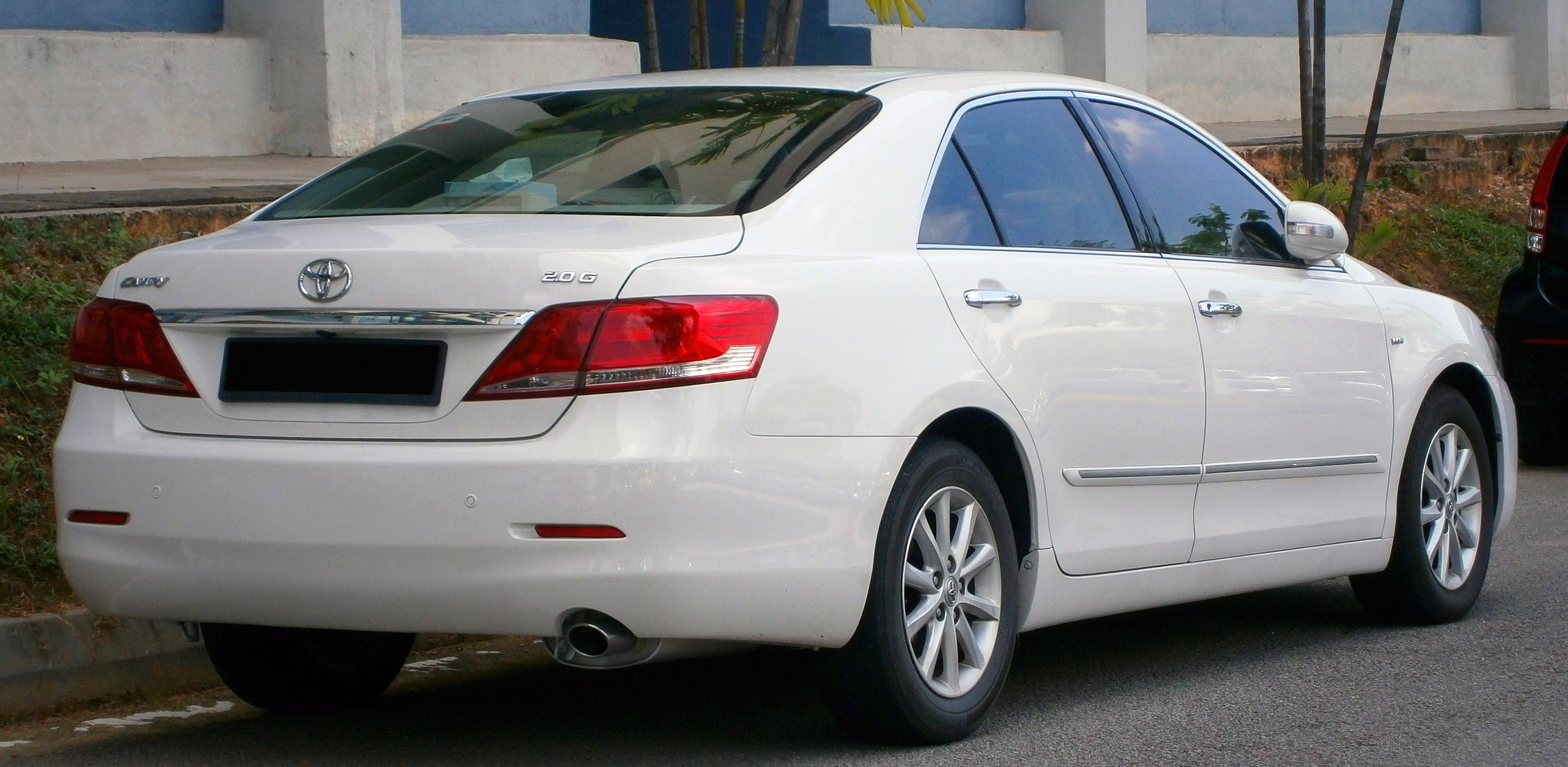
Facelift Toyota Camry (Malaysia)
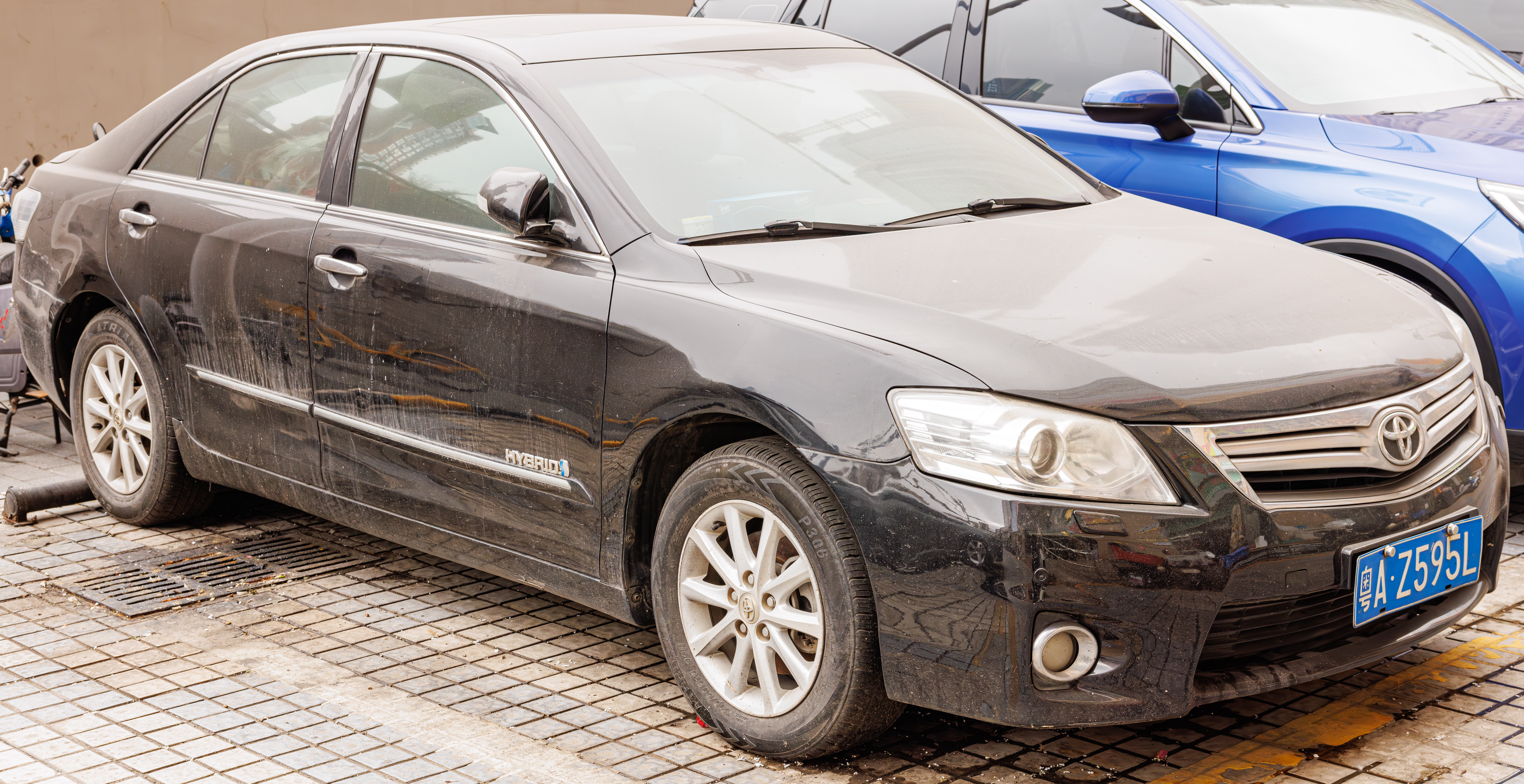
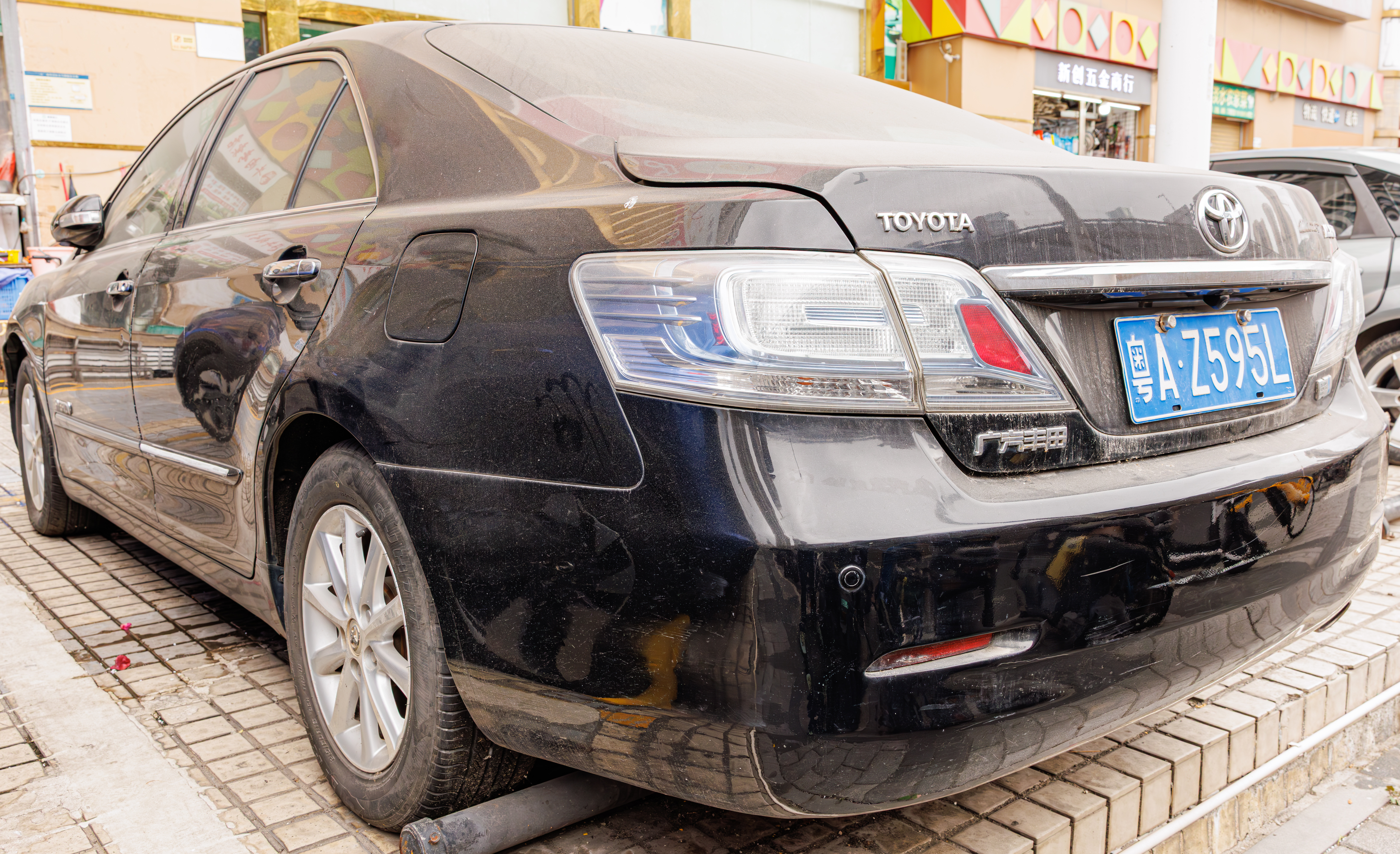
Toyota Camry Hybrid (China)
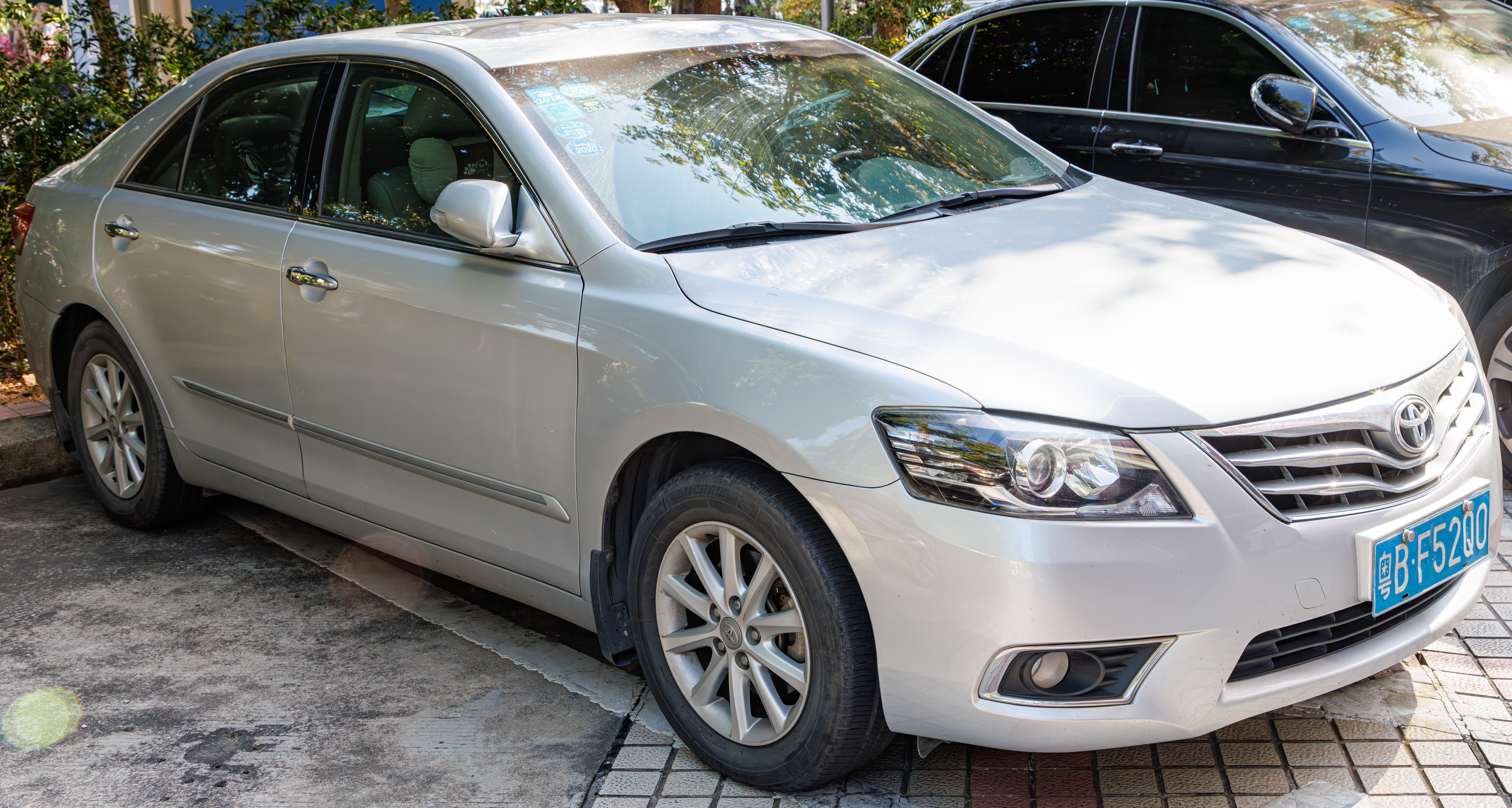
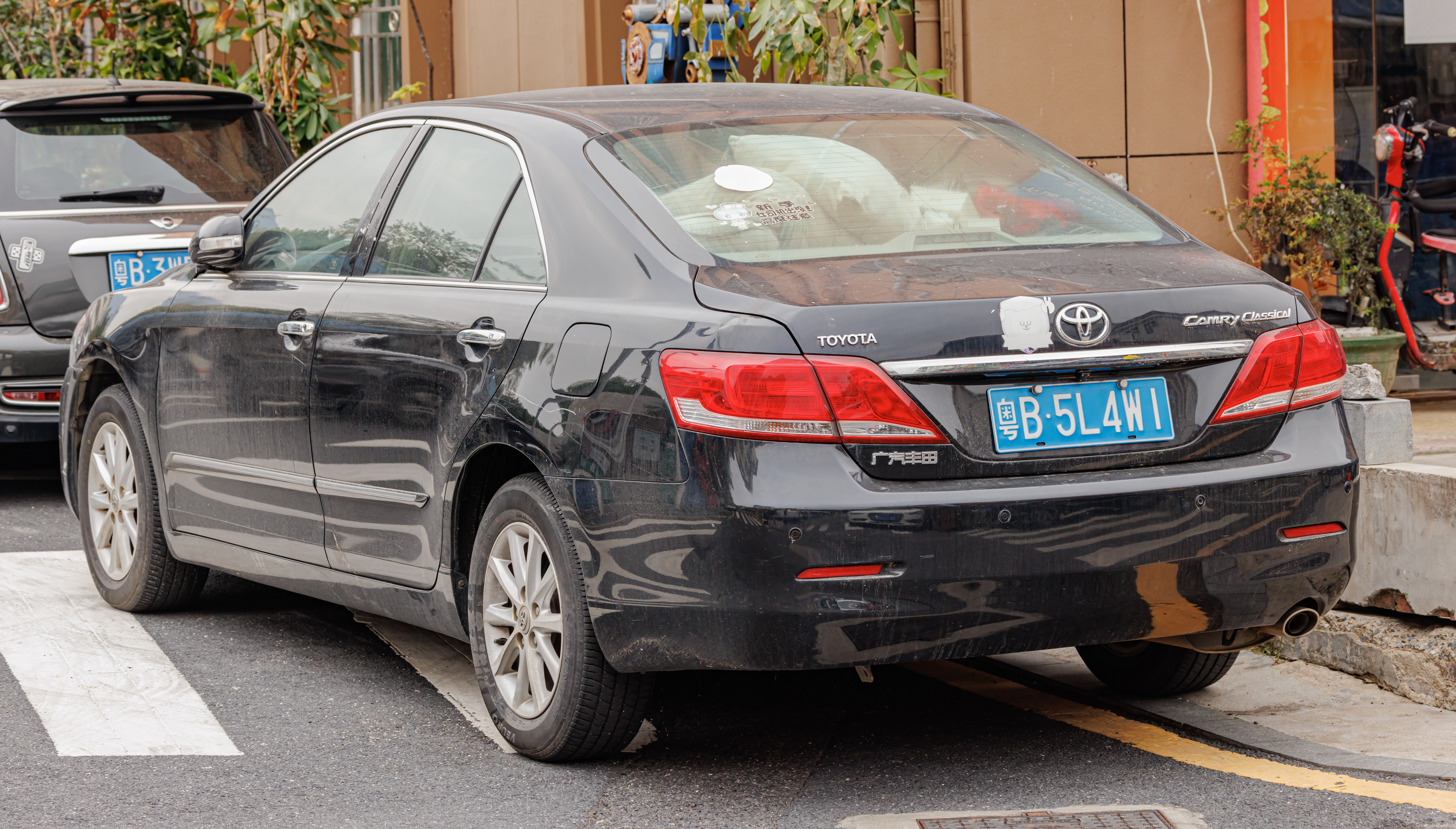
Toyota Camry Classical (China)

Toyota also manufactures and markets the Aurion in parts of East and Southeast Asia, where it is marketed under the Toyota Camry branding. This model gets a redesigned grille and is marketed under different trim levels to their Australasian counterparts. Although these vary from country to country, the range consists of the following models in some markets: 2.0 E, 2.0 G, 2.4 E, 2.4 G, 2.4 Sportivo, 2.4 V, 3.5 V and 3.5 Q. The decimal in the nomenclature denotes the engine displacement, with the letter representing the level of luxury.

In China, the Camry XV40 became the first generation to enter full assembly and production in the country. It was unveiled in late April 2006 and commenced production on 23 May 2006. The Camry is sold in two variants—the 200 and 240. The 200 variant is mated to the 2.0-litre 1AZ-FE while 240 variant gets the 2.4-litre 2AZ-FE. The range consisted of the 200E, 200G, 240E, 240G, and 240V. Transmission choices were the four-speed automatic gearbox for the 200 models and the five-speed automatic for the 240 models. Remaining units were also available as the Camry Classical for the 2013 model year with the 1AZ-FE engine and four-speed automatic gearbox with trims levels.

== TRD Aurion ==
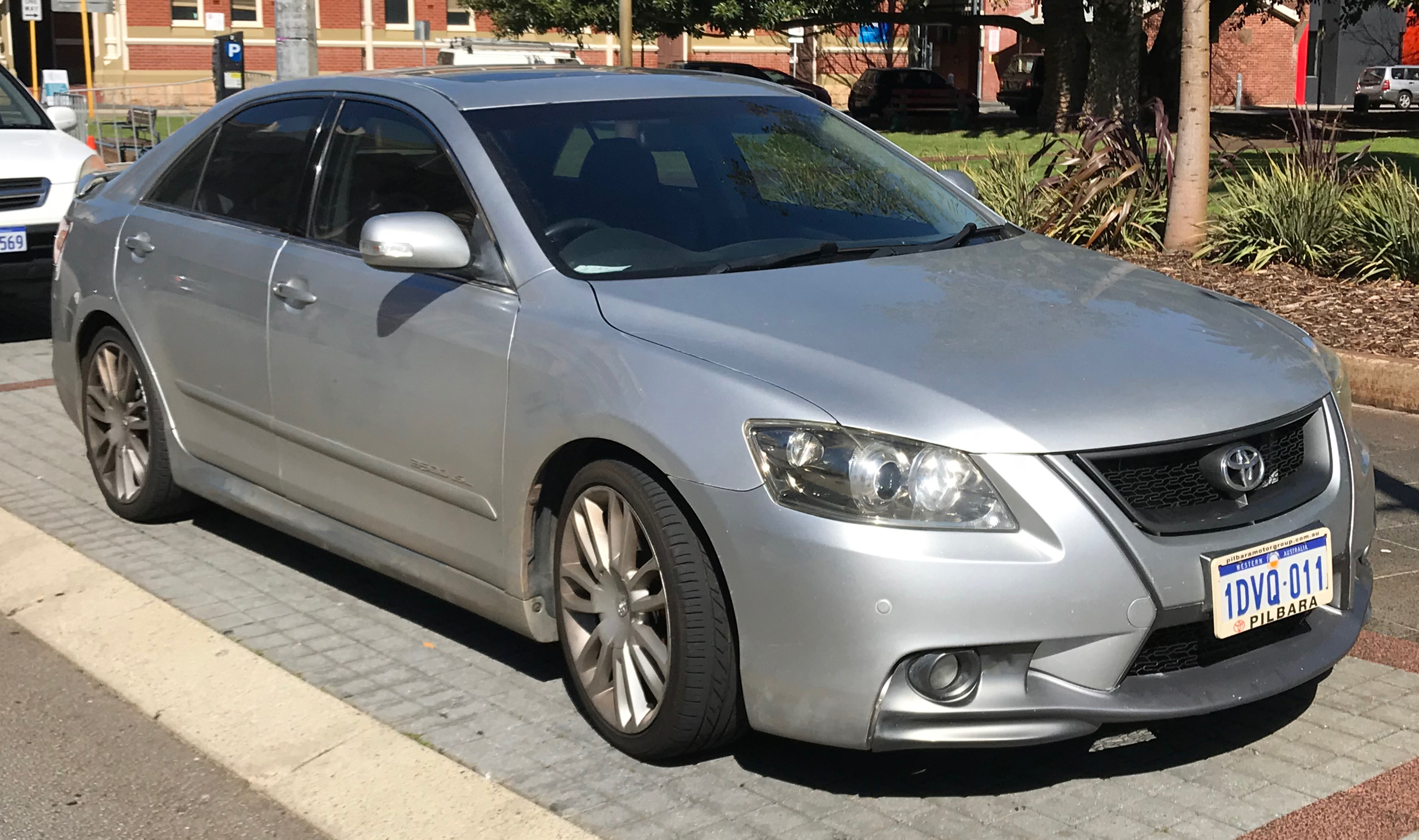
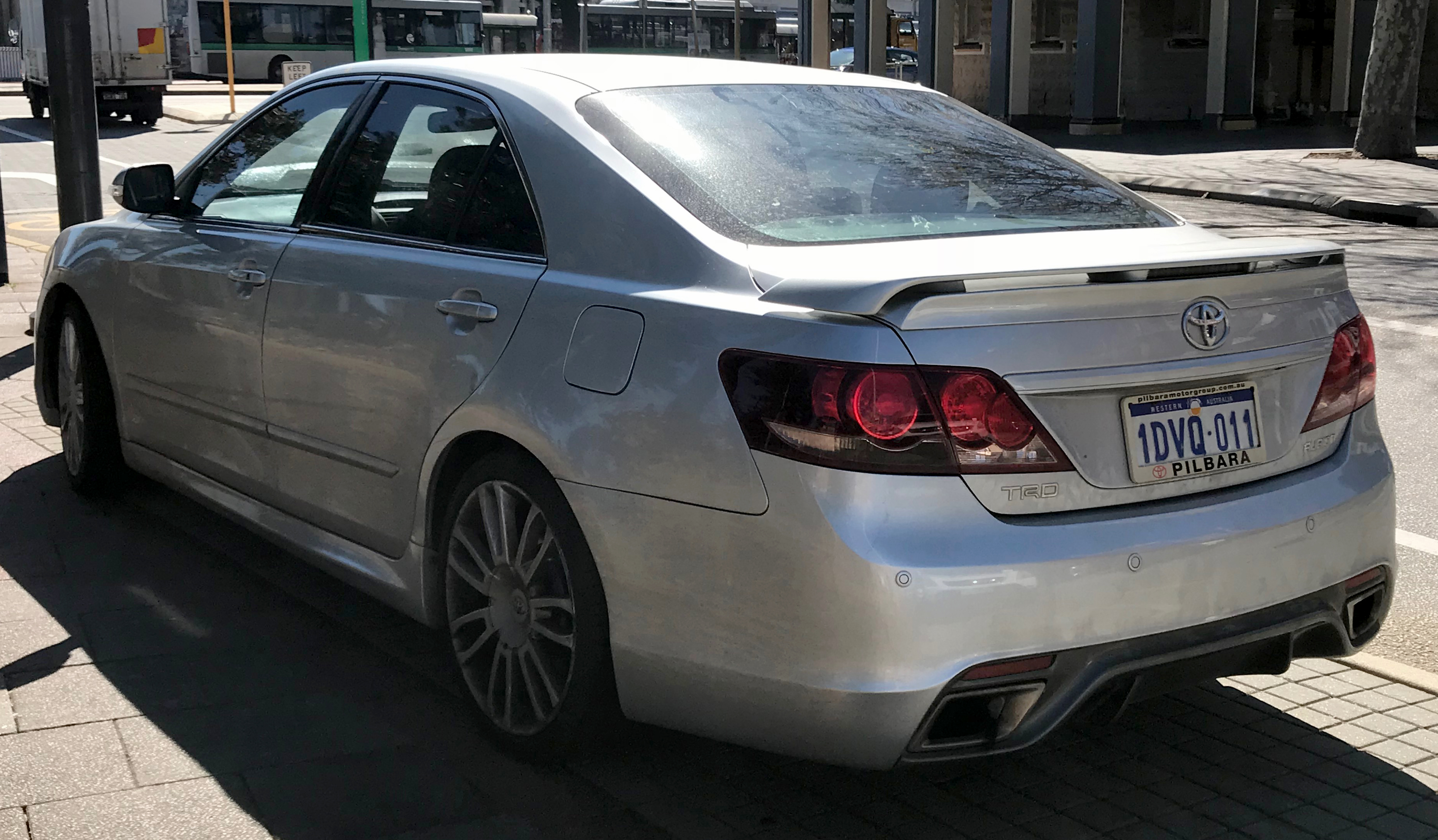
TRD Aurion 3500SL

Toyota unveiled the Aurion Sports Concept at the 2006 Australian International Motor Show, held in Sydney. The A$8 million concept car was a styling exercise previewing the TRD Aurion, which was subsequently released in August 2007. TRD's first experiment with supercharger technology was with the Toyota Camry-based 2005 TS-01 concept.

The project's exterior design manager was Lee Moran, a former Ford Australia designer. He was chosen by Toyota Styling Australia chief Paul Berninger in 2005. One of Moran's focuses was to reduce the size of the grille and add emphasis to the front bumper line below it. This was done so the car had more of a Formula One oriented look. In the Toyota wind tunnel in Japan, the vehicle's drag coefficient was confirmed at 0.30, meaning that the car would operate better aerodynamically than its non-TRD variants. The TRD also features bold exterior additions that differentiate it with the standard Aurion range, such as exhaust pipes integrated into the bumper, tinted taillight lenses, and a unique bodykit. Along with the supercharged 3.5-litre V6 engine outputting 241 kW (323 hp) of power and 400 N⋅m (295 lb⋅ft) of torque, the TRD also incorporates an upgraded suspension system and tyres over the standard Aurion models to improve car handling.

Toyota Australia planned to sell 50 to 70 TRD Aurion units per month with the majority of the sales coming from Australia. However, the project was unsuccessful, and as of 31 March 2009, TRD Australia halted production of the Aurion TRD (and TRD Hilux), and the division was shut down. When available, the range comprised two variants, the 3500S and 3500SL. The former features performance mufflers, 19-inch alloy wheels, red Alcantara leather seats with black Alcantara fabric bolsters and other high-performance upgrades. The range-topping 3500SL adds clearance and reverse parking sensors, dual-zone climate control air conditioning, a colour-coded transmission selection lever, and an eight-way adjustable driver's seat. Furthermore, the SL gains an aluminium rear bumper reinforcement addition, and is the first production car in the world to use the Eaton twin-vortices supercharger. This substantially reduces engine noise while bringing gains to power and torque.

== Sales ==
Year	Australia
2006 (Nov-Dec)	>3,300
2007	22,036
2008	19,562
2009	13,910
2010	11,764
2011	8,915
2012 (Jan-Mar)	1,602

== Bibliography ==
- Carey, John (March 2006). "Shock and Aurion". Wheels. Sydney, New South Wales.
- Carey, John (February 2007). "COTY 2006 – Toyota Aurion". Wheels. Sydney, New South Wales. Archived from the original on 24 September 2009.
- Carey, John (September 2007). "TRD Aurion". Wheels. Sydney, New South Wales.
- Robinson, Peter (November 2006). "Back from the dread". Wheels. Sydney, New South Wales. Archived from the original on 4 December 2009.
