= Toyota Sportivo Coupe =

Overview
- Manufacturer: Toyota Motor Corporation
- Production: 2004 (Concept car)

Body and chassis
- Class: Sport compact car (S)
- Body style: 2-door coupe
- Layout: Front-engine, four-wheel-drive
- Doors: Butterfly
- Related: Toyota Camry; Toyota RAV4

Powertrain
- Engine: 2.4 L 2AZ-FE I4 (petrol)
- Transmission: 5-speed automatic

The Toyota Sportivo Coupe is a concept car developed by Toyota Australia. The car is most notable for not only its decidedly high-tech design, but that it was designed by a group of teenagers (ages 14–18). Key design elements include a speedometer in which the speed limit always occupies the 12 o'clock position. It also features GPS, Bluetooth, and a Driver I.D. system which automatically configures the car to the drivers settings saved on the card. The entire vehicle was built in 30 weeks using CAD and rapid prototyping. The vehicle is built on top of a modular Toyota frame using a modified drive train from the Camry and RAV4.
