= Toyota Camry (XV30) =

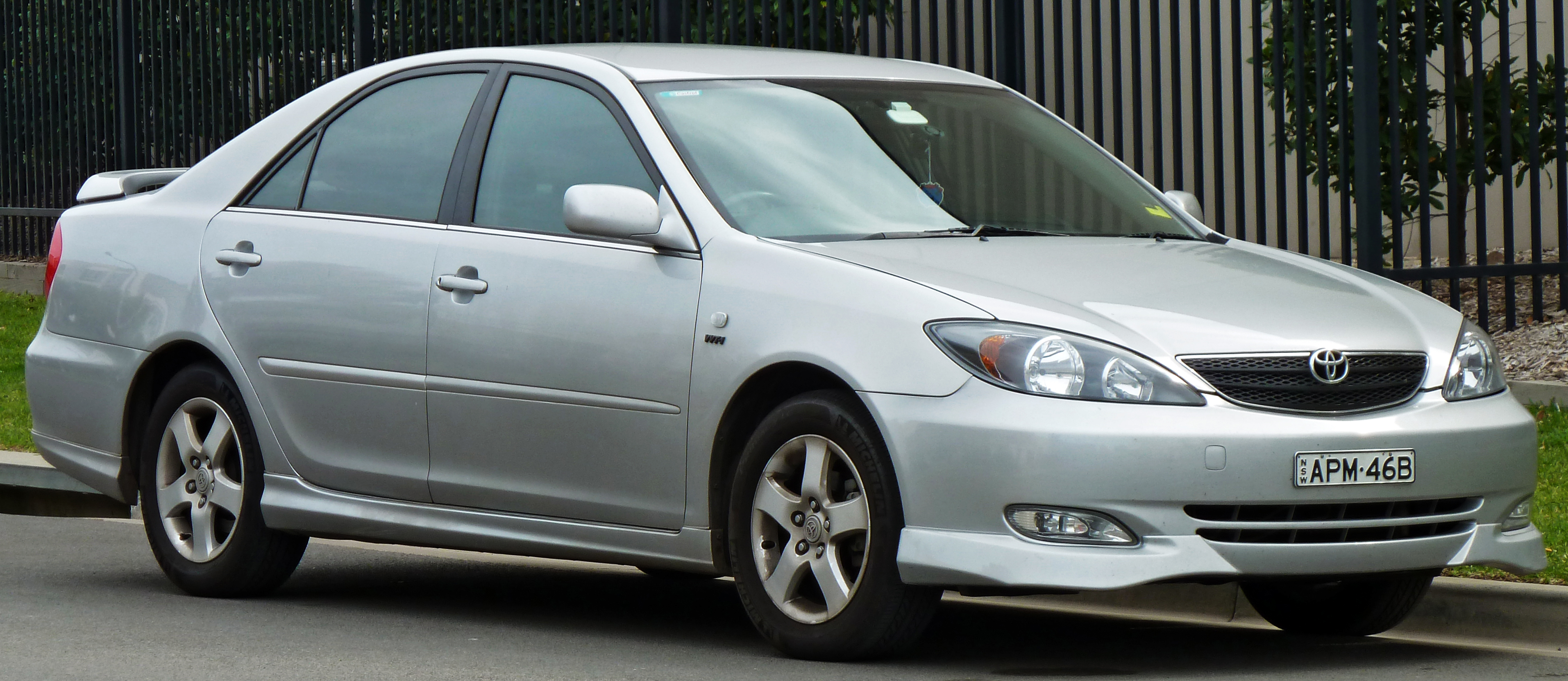

Overview
- Manufacturer: Toyota
- Also called: Daihatsu Altis (Japan)
- Production: June 2001 – December 2005 (Japan); July 2001 – February 2006 (US); August 2002 – June 2006 (Australia)
- Model years: 2002–2006
- Assembly: Japan: Toyota, Aichi (Tsutsumi plant); Australia: Altona; Malaysia: Shah Alam; Philippines: Santa Rosa (TMP); Taiwan: Zhongli (Kuozui Motors); Thailand: Chachoengsao; United States: Georgetown, Kentucky; Vietnam: Phúc Yên, Vĩnh Phúc
- Designer: Kengo Matsumoto, Hiroyuki Metsugi and Machio Nakamura (1999)

Body and chassis
- Class: Mid-size car
- Body style: 4-door sedan
- Layout: Front-engine, front-wheel drive; Front-engine, four-wheel drive
- Platform: Toyota K platform
- Related: Lexus ES/Toyota Windom (XV30); Toyota Avalon/Pronard (XX20); Toyota Avalon (XX10) (for Australian market); Toyota Camry Solara (XV30)

Powertrain
- Engine: 2.0 L 1AZ-FE VVT-i I4, 107 kW (144 hp); 2.4 L 2AZ-FE VVT-i I4, 117 kW (157 hp); 3.0 L 1MZ-FE VVT-i V6; 143 kW (192 hp) w/o VVT-i (2002); 157 kW (210 hp) w/ VVT-i (2003–2006); 3.3 L 3MZ-FE VVT-i V6; 168 kW (225 hp) SE (2004–2006)
- Transmission: 5-speed manual; 4-speed U241E automatic; 5-speed U151E automatic; 4-speed U140E automatic; 5-speed U250E automatic

Dimensions
- Wheelbase: 2,720 mm (107.1 in)
- Length: 4,820 mm (189.8 in)
- Width: 1,810 mm (71.3 in)
- Height: 1,490 mm (58.7 in) (2005–06); 1,470 mm (57.9 in) (2002–04 LE); 1,480 mm (58.3 in) (2002–04 SE & XLE)

Chronology
- Predecessor: Toyota Camry (XV20)
- Successor: Toyota Camry (XV40) (regular, except Europe); Toyota Aurion (XV40) (prestige, except Europe); Toyota Avensis (T250) (Europe)

The Toyota Camry (XV30) is a mid-size car produced by Toyota from June 2001 to January 2006. The XV30 series represented the fifth generation of the Toyota Camry in all markets outside Japan, which followed a different generational lineage. The XV30 range is split into different model codes indicative of the engine. Four-cylinder models utilize the ACV30 (front-wheel drive) and ACV35 (all-wheel drive) codes, with MCV30 (3.0-liter) and MCV31 (3.3-liter) designating the six-cylinder versions.

On August 27, 2001, for the 2002 model year, the Toyota Camry was released as a larger sedan (taking styling cues from the successful Vitz, Corolla and Solara) only, but without a station wagon for the first time. Due to station wagons losing popularity to minivans and crossover SUVs, the Camry wagon was replaced by the Sienna minivan (in North America only) and the Highlander SUV, both vehicles utilizing the Camry's platform.

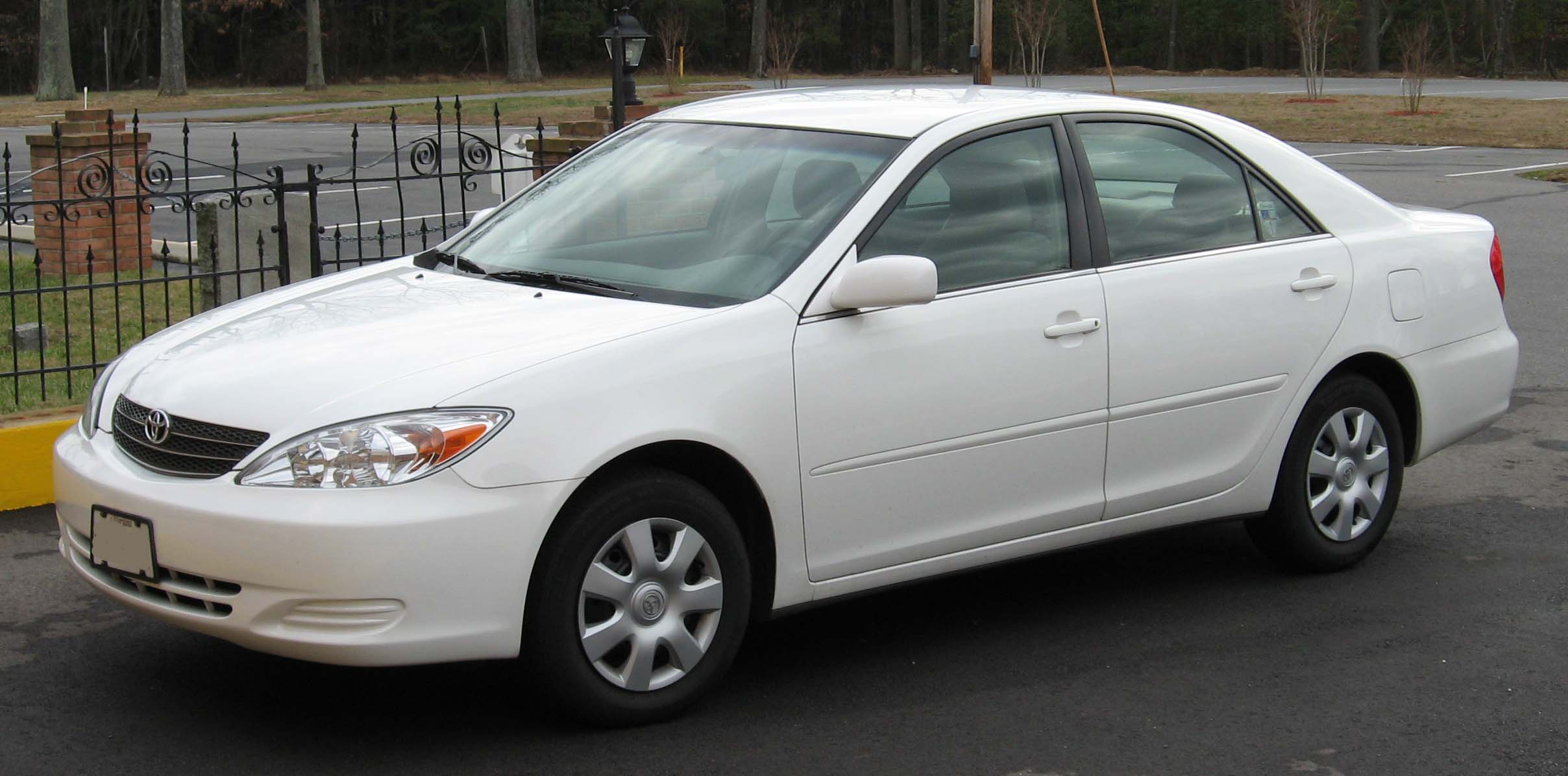
International/North American version

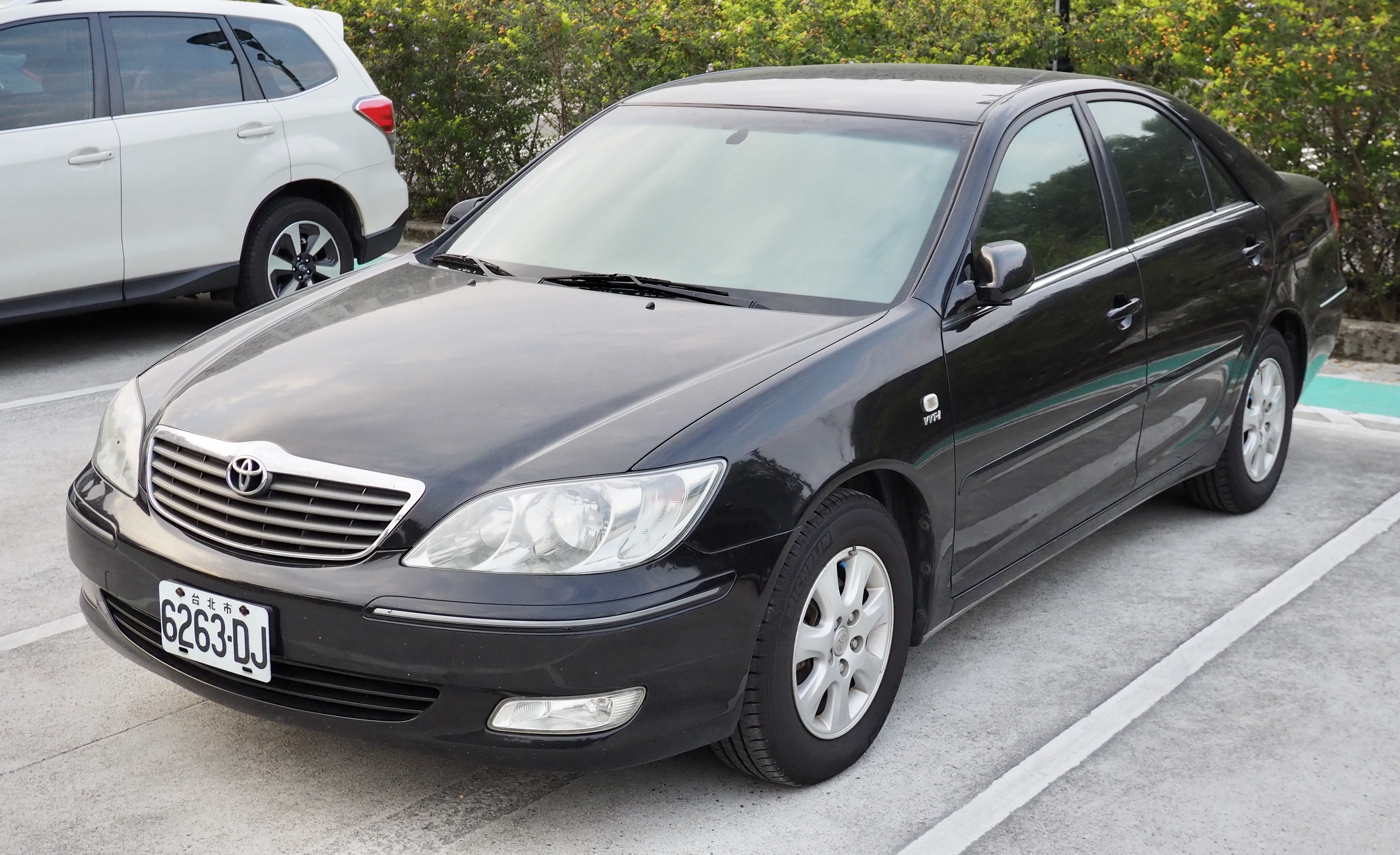
Southeast Asian/Taiwanese version

== Design and development ==
Body code	Engine	Drive	Equation	Model code
XV30	2.0 L 1AZ-FE	FWD	Z + X = C (AZ + XV = ACV)	ACV31
XV30	2.4 L 2AZ-FE	FWD	Z + X = C (AZ + XV = ACV)	ACV30
XV30	2.4 L 2AZ-FE	AWD	Z + X = C (AZ + XV = ACV)	ACV35
XV30	3.0 L 1MZ-FE	FWD	Z + X = C (MZ + XV = MCV)	MCV30
XV30	3.3 L 3MZ-FE	FWD	Z + X = C (MZ + XV = MCV)	MCV31

Development of the XV30 began in 1997 after launch of the XV20 under chief engineer Kosaku Yamada. By 1999, 26 months ahead of scheduled production, a new design by Hiroyuki Metsugi was chosen and later frozen in July 1999 for June 2001 production. The production development process (which began in April 1999) was reduced by 10 months, from the prior XV20's 36 months to 26 months. Design patents were filed at the Japan Patent office on January 25, 2000 and registered under patent No. 1142401.

The front end of the car was relatively short, leaving a great deal of the length to the cabin, a technique adopted by compact cars. In contrast to the fairly squat XV20 Camry, the XV30 generation was a decidedly tall vehicle. It was 64 mm (2.5 in) taller and had a 51 mm (2 in) longer wheelbase than the previous model. The coefficient of drag had been reduced to Cd=0.28.

Two engines were available, an all-new 2.4-liter 2AZ-FE VVT-i I4 engine and a carry over 3.0-liter 1MZ-FE V6 engine. Both engines in the United States were ULEV certified. Any model could be equipped with a V6 or a 4-speed automatic transmission, although the manual transmission was not available on V6 models outside of Australia and New Zealand. The Camry's front suspension used MacPherson struts mounted to a front sub-frame while the rear suspension used a dual link setup also mounted to its own rear sub-frame.

For safety ABS, Vehicle Stability Control, front and rear head side curtain airbags, and front seat-mounted torso side airbags were optional. The Insurance Institute for Highway Safety (IIHS) rated the Camry Good overall in their frontal offset crash test. In their side impact test a Good overall rating was given to models equipped with side airbags, while models without side airbags were given a Poor overall rating.

In North America, model year 2002–2006 Toyota Camry models equipped with side and curtain airbags have the number 0 in position 7 of the VIN as part of the Vehicle Description Section (VDS).

== Camry Solara ==
Until the 2003 model year, the Camry Solara remained on the previous XV20 chassis, and received only minor styling upgrades to the front and rear ends. However, the Solara did receive the same 2.4-liter 2AZ-FE I4 engine that was available on the Camry sedan.

The second generation Camry Solara was introduced in 2003 as a 2004 model. Again, styling from the Camry was radically different, taking design cues from the Lexus SC 430.

== Toyota Camry TS-01 ==
A high-performance concept of the Toyota Camry, named the Toyota Camry TS-01 was shown at the 2005 Melbourne International Motor Show. This concept vehicle had significant performance and visual upgrades from the production Toyota Camry and hinted at the TRD Aurion.

== Safety ==
ANCAP test results Toyota Camry Altise sedan with dual frontal airbags (2002)
Test	Score
Overall	4 /5 stars
Frontal offset	11.57/16
Side impact	14.74/16
Pole	Not Assessed
Seat belt reminders	0/3
Whiplash protection	Not Assessed
Pedestrian protection	Poor
Electronic stability control	Not Assessed

== Markets ==
XV30 Camrys were manufactured in at the Tsutsumi plant in Toyota City, Japan; Toyota Australia's Toyota Australia Altona Plant; Toyota Motor Manufacturing Kentucky manufacturing plant in Georgetown, Kentucky, United States; and at the Toyota Gateway Plant in Chachoengsao, Thailand. Other manufacturing facilities for their respective regional markets include locations in Malaysia, Indonesia, and Taiwan.

=== Japan ===
The XV30 Camry was launched in Japan in September 2001. Daihatsu continued with its twin Altis model for the Japanese market. The second generation Altis was introduced in the same month as the Camry, and was available with the 2AZ-FE 2.4-litre four-cylinder engine. Visually, the Altis is very similar to the Japanese market Camry with the 4-cylinder engine. The Verossa was also sold during this model timeframe, offering Japanese buyers a well-equipped sedan with similar dimensions to the Camry, with a rear-wheel drive powertrain setup, or an optional all-wheel drive that the Camry did not offer. The Verossa was not a strong seller, and was replaced by the Mark X in 2004, continuing to offer a rear-wheel drive powertrain.

=== North America ===
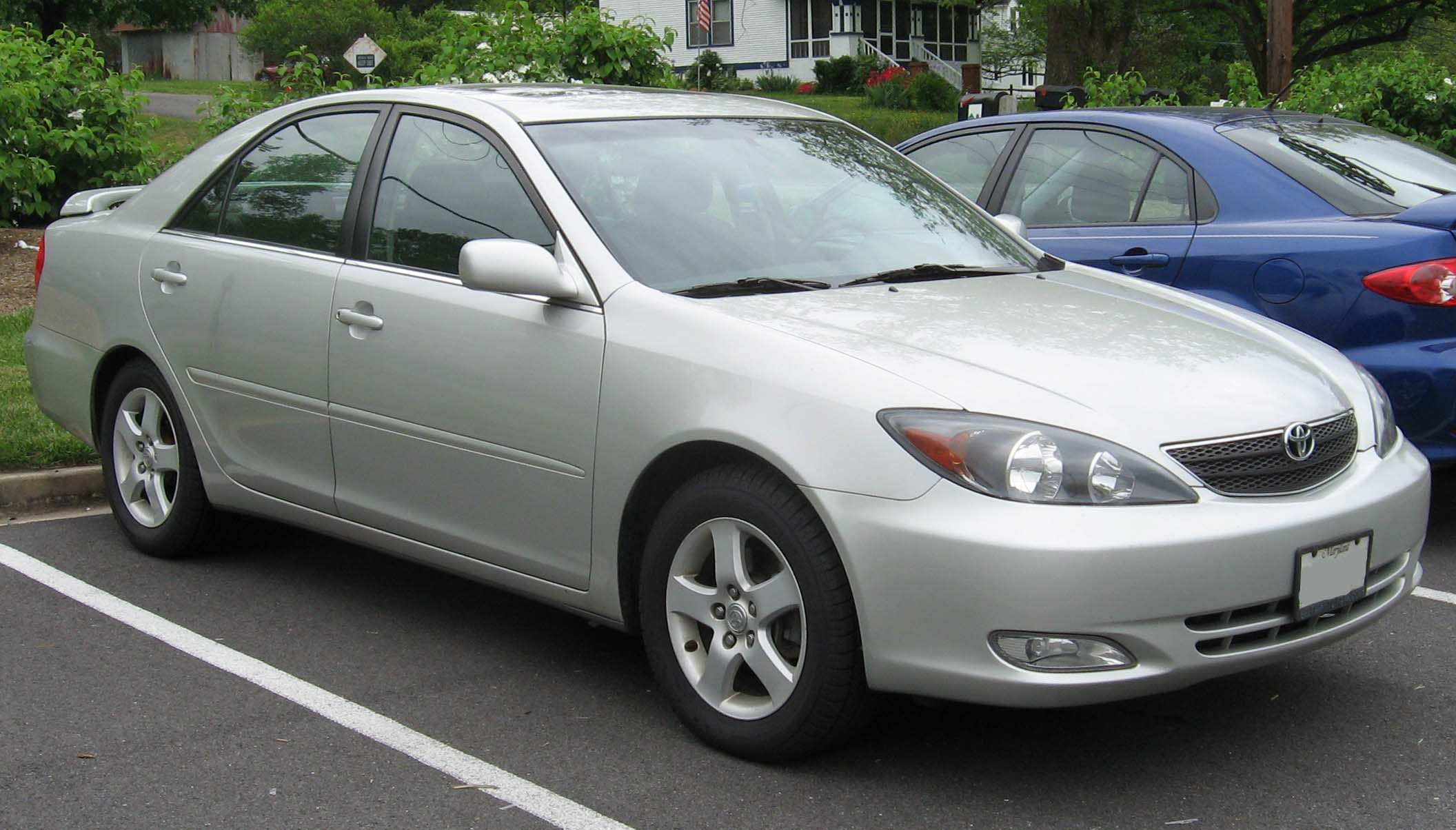
Pre-facelift Toyota Camry SE (US)

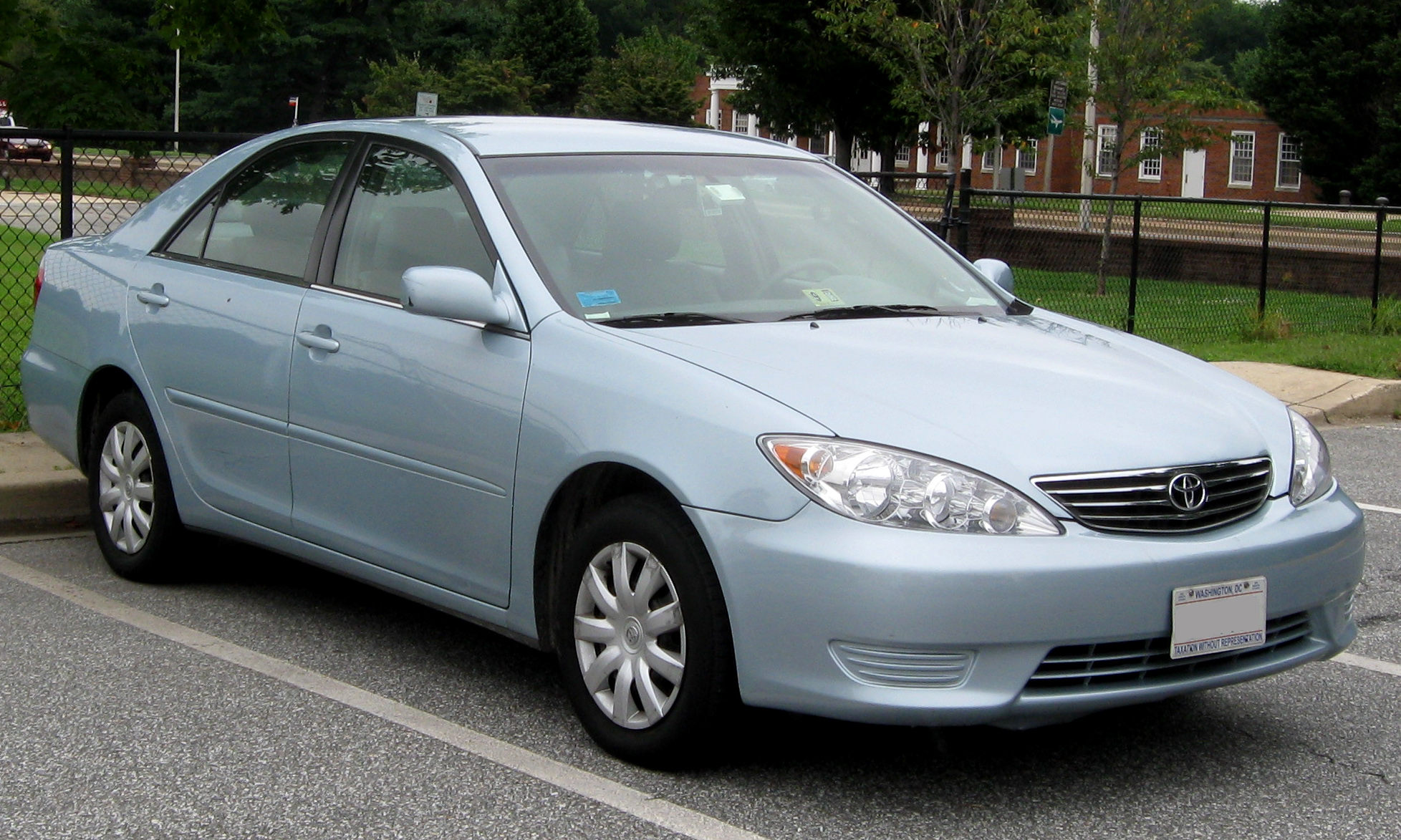
Facelift Toyota Camry LE (US)

US production started on July 23, 2001. In the United States, the basic CE model was dropped and the SE sport model was reintroduced. The LE was available with a 2.4-liter inline-four with either a five-speed manual or a four-speed automatic. However, the SE introduced a 3.0 and a 3.3-liter V6 engine, now available with a five-speed automatic, as well as the aforementioned transmissions. Some of this generation Camry sold in the US are being produced at TMMK as well as at Tsutsumi Plant in Toyota, Aichi, Japan. A Camry manufactured in Japan is denoted with a VIN starting with "JTD", as well as a small hatch on the passenger's side of the front bumper containing equipment that is compatible with Japanese towing systems; US-made models are denoted with a VIN starting with "4T1". In addition to the LE and SE trims, the top-of-the-line XLE came standard with alloy wheels, JBL premium audio system, and leather, as well as optional side airbags and Vehicle Stability Control (VSC).

In 2002, for the 2003 model year, a few new features were added including the optional, power-adjustable pedals and pedal-type parking brake for the XLE trim. The 3.0-liter 1MZ-FE engine was now equipped with VVT-i, increasing horsepower from 142 to 157 kW (190 to 210 bhp).

For 2004 models, the Standard and Limited Edition trims were included for the US market. In SE models, a 3.3-liter 3MZ-FE V6 replaced the smaller 3.0-liter 1MZ-FE.

For 2005 models, Toyota introduced its refreshed Camry with new upgrades such as a chrome grille, with the SE having a unique, blackout grille. Other exterior changes are new headlight and taillight designs, redesigned front bumper, and new wheels. Interior upgrades to the Camry included a rear center head restraint, a storage bin in the door, Optitron electroluminescent gauges, steering wheel-mounted audio controls standard for all trim levels, chrome interior door handles and shift gear button, and standard leather seating on V6-powered XLE trims. A 5-speed automatic transmission also replaced the previous 4-speed automatic and ABS became standard on all trims.

==== Engines ====
Type	Model years	Power	Torque
2,362 cc (144.1 cu in) 2AZ-FE inline-four	2002–2004	117 kW (157 bhp) at 5600 rpm	220 N⋅m (162 lb⋅ft) at 4000 rpm
2,362 cc (144.1 cu in) 2AZ-FE inline-four	2005–2006	115 kW (154 bhp) at 5600 rpm	217 N⋅m (160 lb⋅ft) at 4000 rpm
2,994 cc (182.7 cu in) 1MZ-FE V6	2002–2004	142 kW (190 bhp) at 5800 rpm	267 N⋅m (197 lb⋅ft) at 4400 rpm
2,994 cc (182.7 cu in) 1MZ-FE V6	2005–2006	157 kW (210 bhp) at 5800 rpm	298 N⋅m (220 lb⋅ft) at 4400 rpm
3,311 cc (202.0 cu in) 3MZ-FE V6	2004	168 kW (225 bhp) at 5600 rpm	325 N⋅m (240 lb⋅ft) at 3600 rpm
3,311 cc (202.0 cu in) 3MZ-FE V6	2005–2006	157 kW (210 bhp) at 5600 rpm	298 N⋅m (220 lb⋅ft) at 3600 rpm

=== China ===
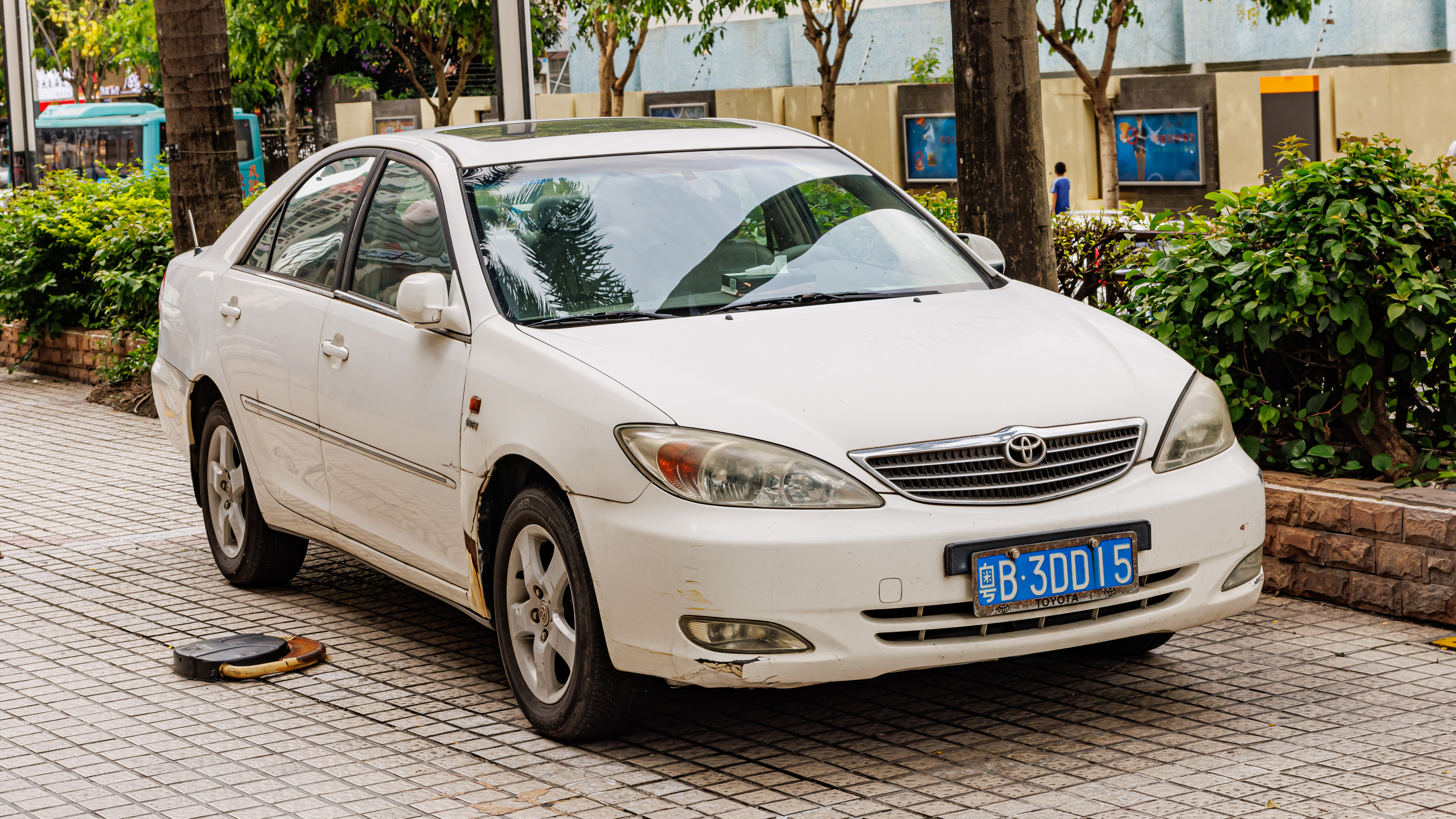
TOYOTA CAMRY (XV30) China front

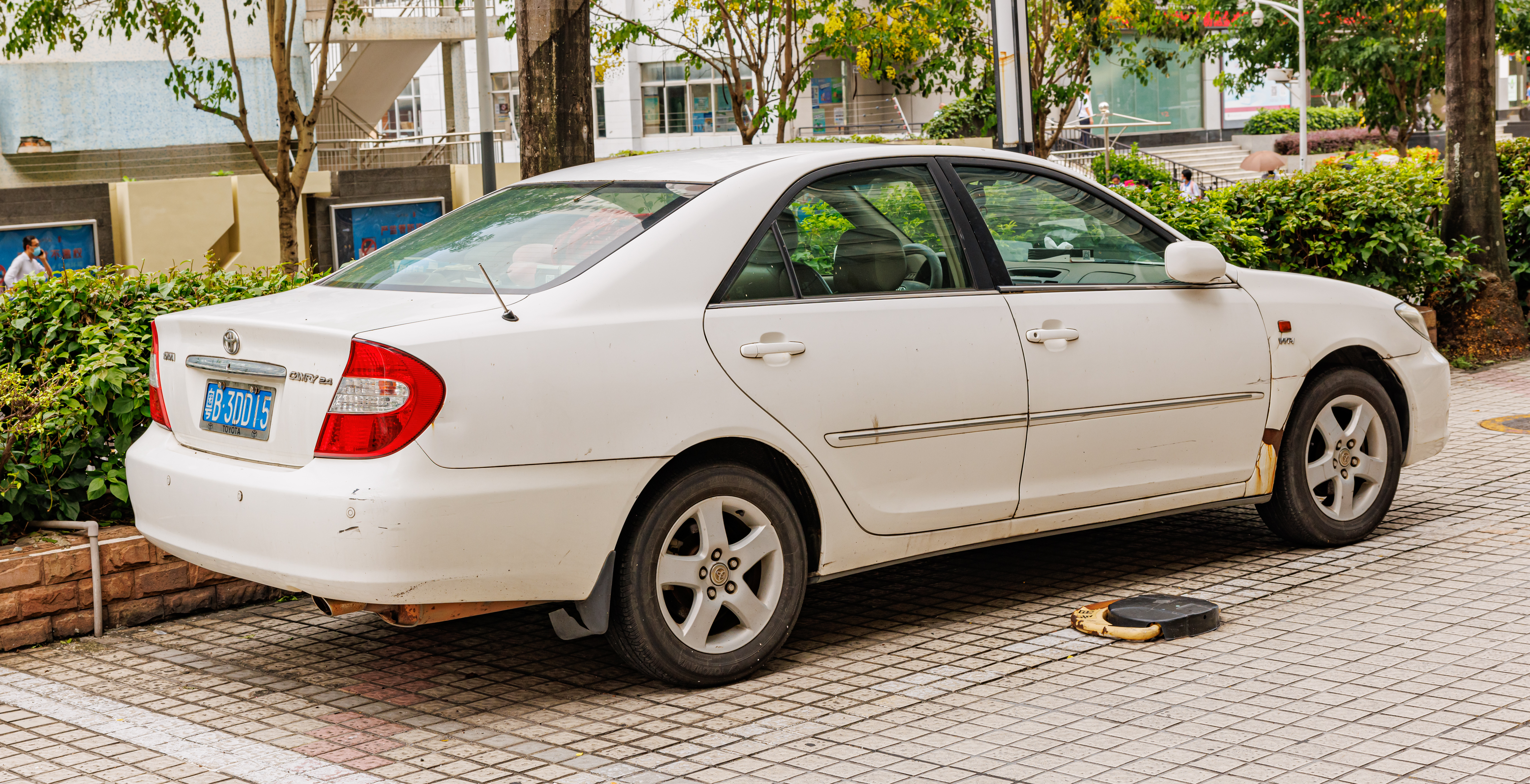
TOYOTA CAMRY (XV30) China rear

In China, the XV30 Camry was imported from Japan and launched there in 2004. The 2.4 litre 2AZ-FE was the only engine available, paired to the 4 speed automatic gearbox. Pricing for the Camry was 336.800 yuan ($US53,270 - January 2022 exchange rate). As such, China received the same styling as the US, the Middle East, and Australia.

=== Australia and New Zealand ===
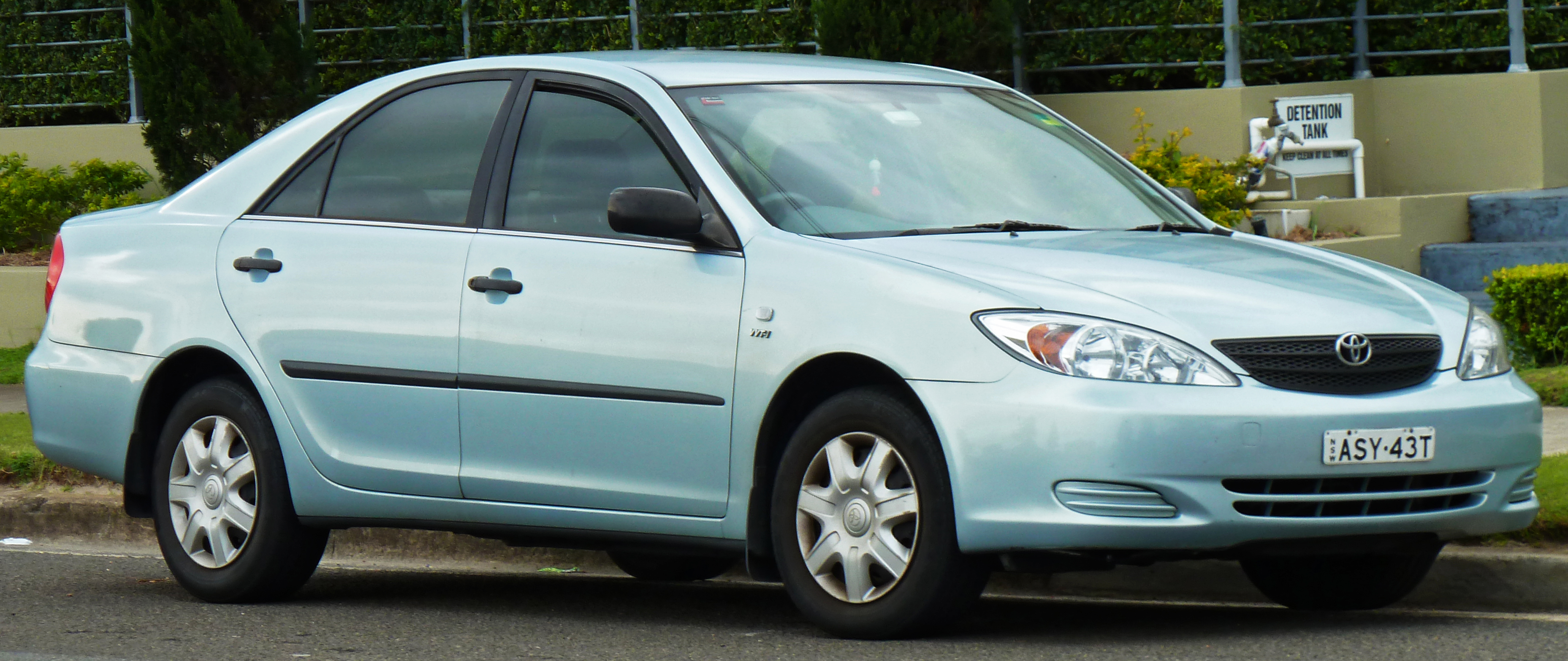
Pre-facelift Toyota Camry Altise (ACV36R; Australia)

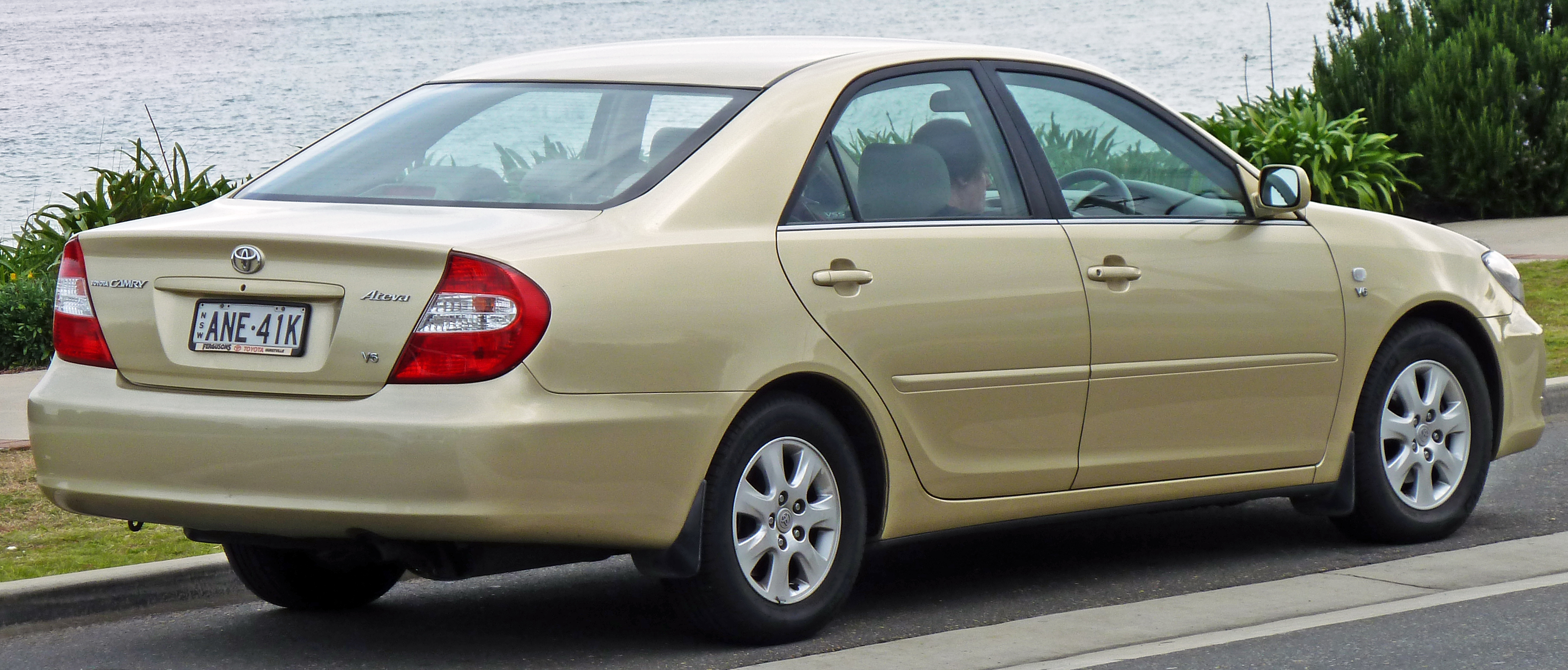
Pre-facelift Toyota Camry Ateva (MCV36R; Australia)

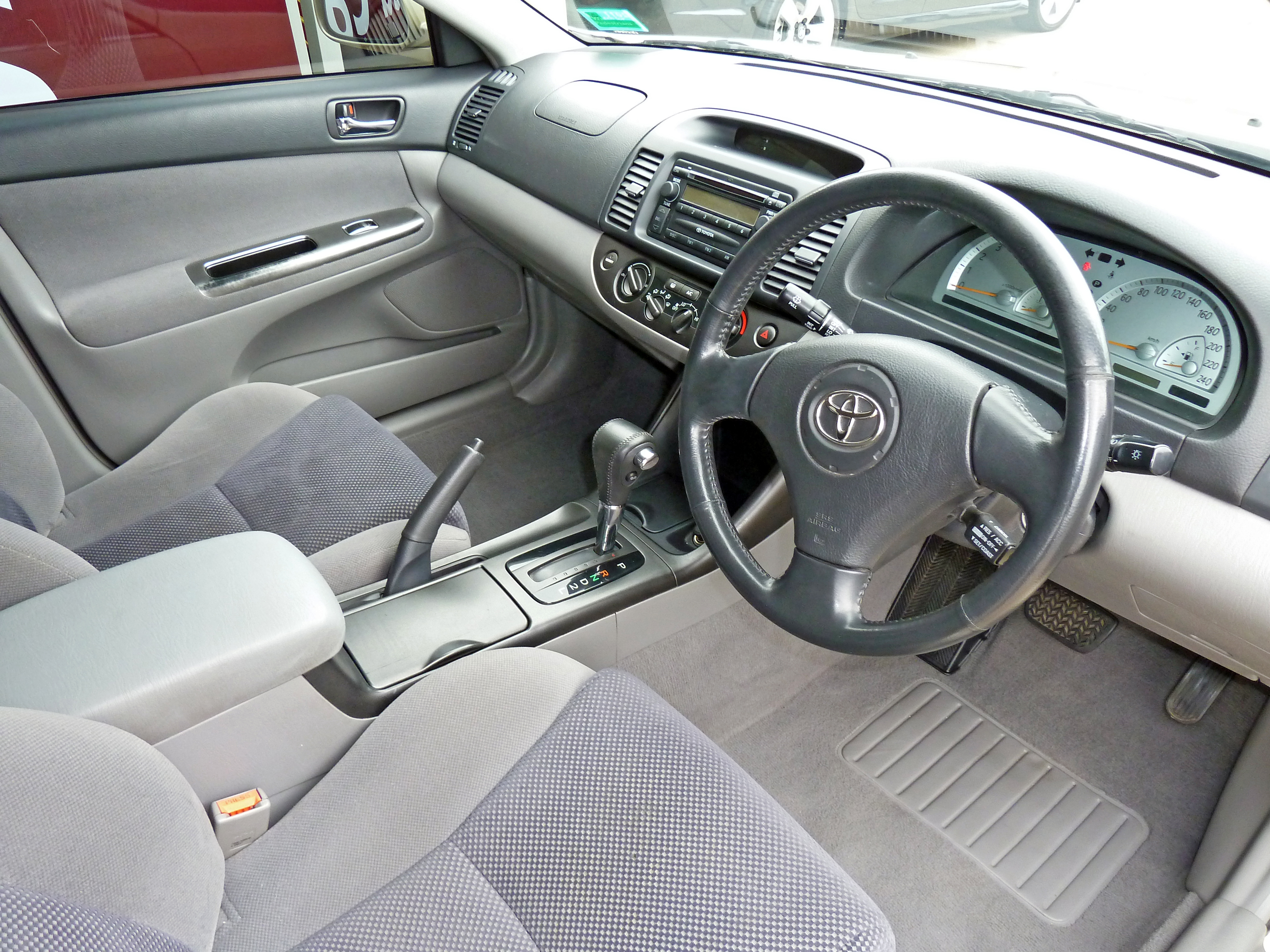
Interior (pre-facelift)

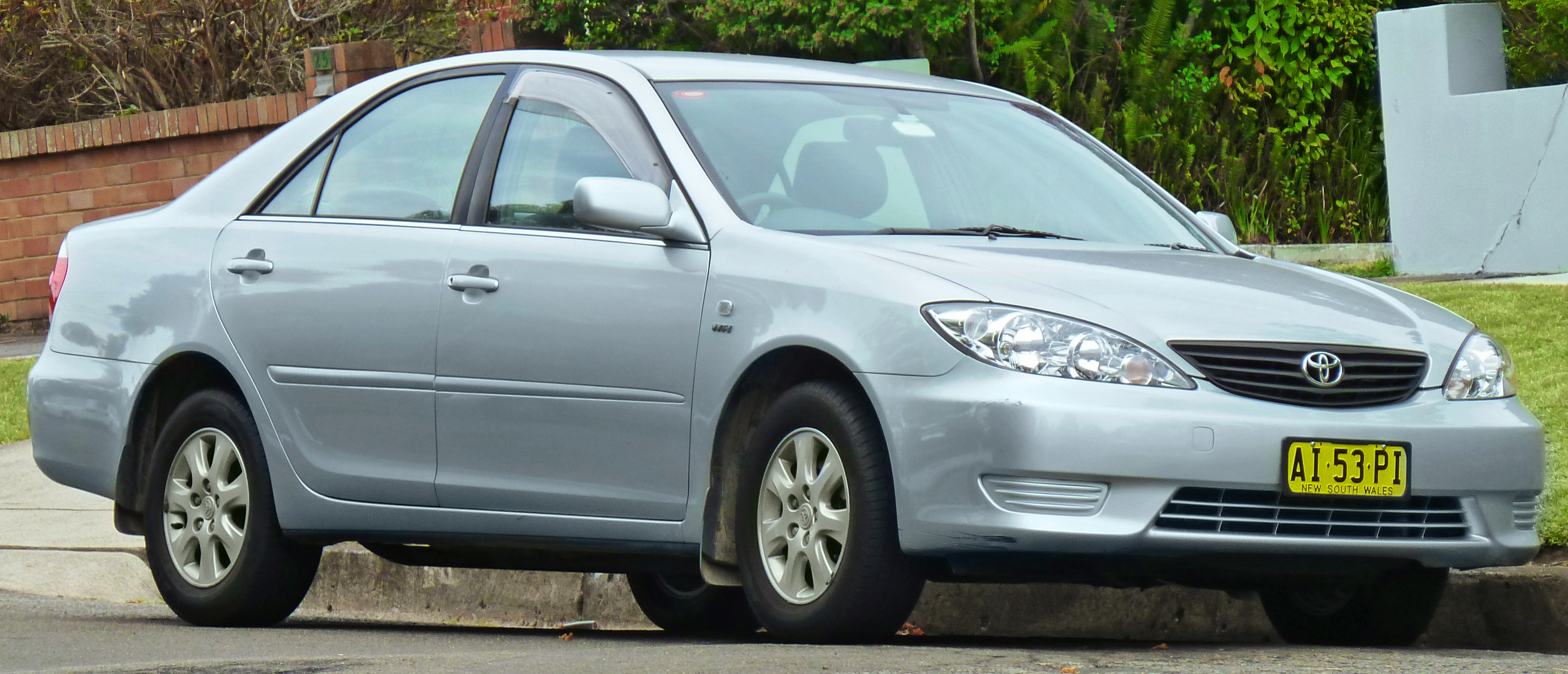
Facelift Toyota Camry Altise Limited (ACV36R; Australia)

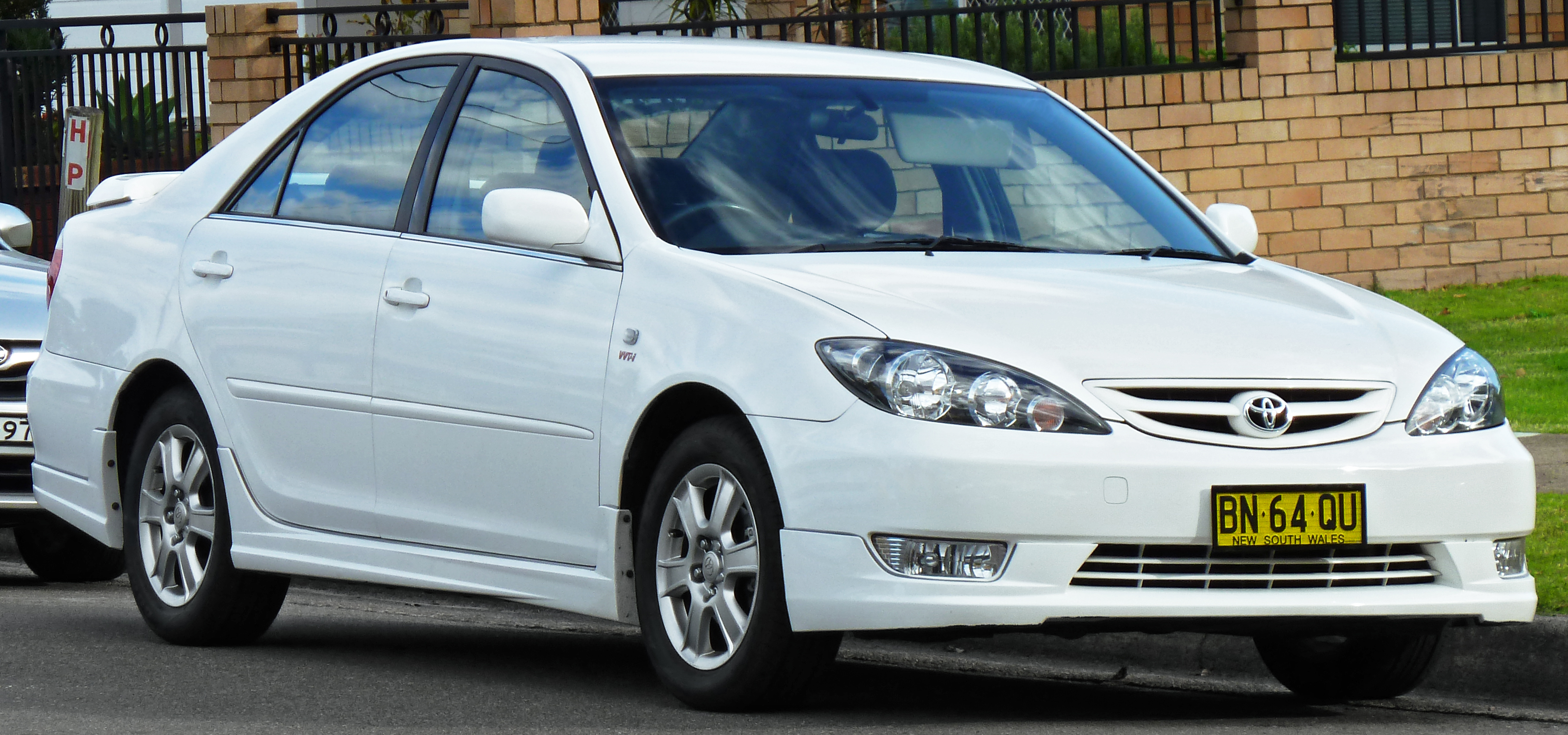

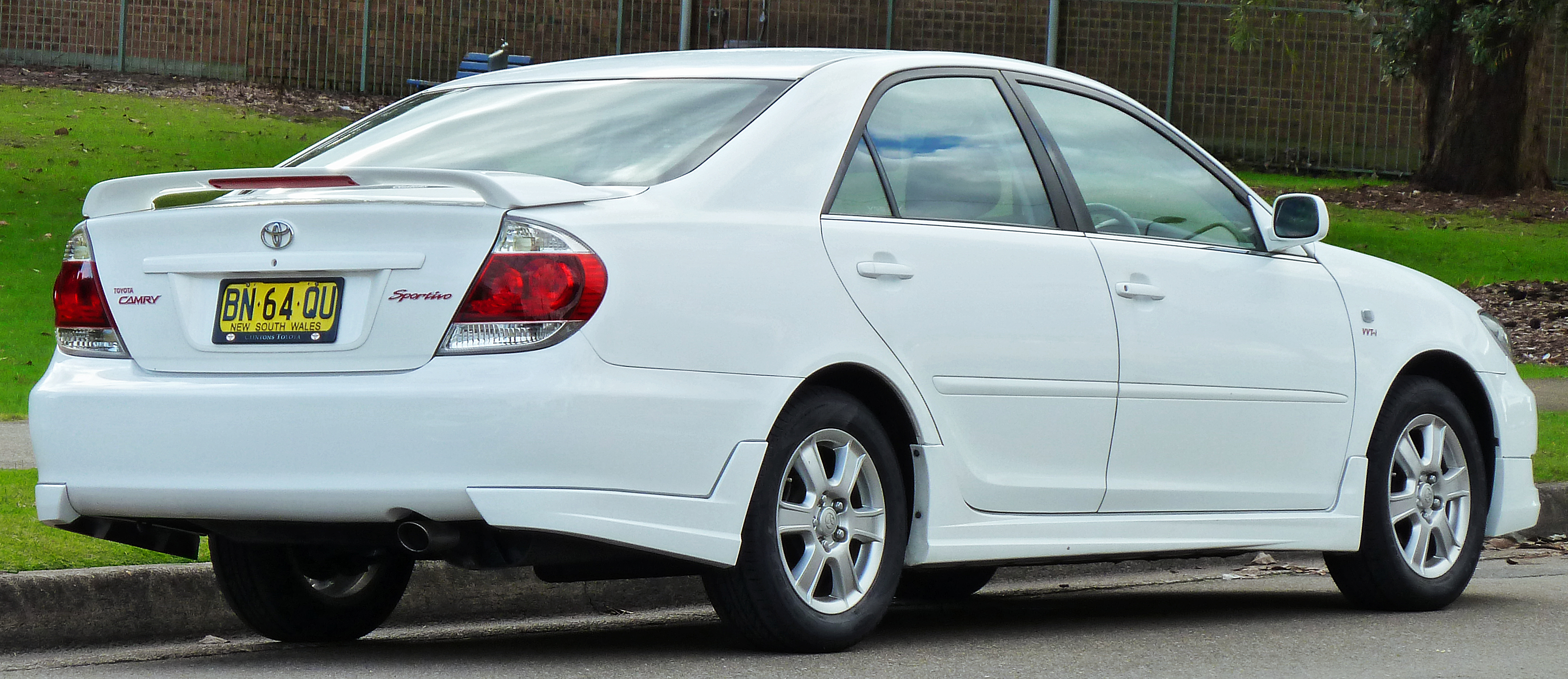
Facelift Toyota Camry Sportivo (ACV36R; Australia)

The Australian market Camry was released in September 2002. In Australia and New Zealand, the 2002 to 2006 Camry is available in five different trims: the Altise, Ateva, Sportivo, Grande (2004 onwards) and Azura. The Altise, Ateva and Sportivo are available with either the 2.4 L four-cylinder or the 3.0 L V6 engine, whilst the Grande and Azura were only available with the latter. Only the Altise and Sportivo models could be fitted with a manual transmission—all other models are equipped with a four-speed automatic transmission. In 2003, the V6-powered Altise Sport model was introduced, which is basically the Altise model with the sports suspension that was fitted on the Sportivo and Azura models and was available in manual and automatic transmission. In terms of performance and specifications, the Australian and New Zealand market Camry Sportivo corresponds roughly to the American Camry SE.

The Australian and New Zealand models were significantly different from the other Camry models around the world and had around 77% locally developed components to suit Australian and New Zealand roads and driving conditions. The brakes, body panels (which would only fit on the Australian made body and chassis), headlights, seats, radio antenna and suspension were all locally developed after 10,000 km of extensive testing in New Zealand under the supervision of Toyota engineers. Power output on the Altise Sport, V6 Sportivo and Azura models was 145 kW (194 bhp) compared with the 141 kW (189 bhp) of the standard V6 models due to a high-flow rear muffler.

When the revised range was launched in Australia and New Zealand in September 2004, the Grande model was reintroduced which, together with the Azura model, were the top-of-the-range models. The Grande however was fitted with the standard suspension rather than the sports suspension as fitted on the Azura model. The Grande and Azura models have Satellite Navigation (GPS) as standard equipment, and were the first Toyota models in Australia to be fitted with the new Toyota Link system. The Toyota Link system is a state-of-the-art satellite and mobile SMS GSM communications system that gives the driver access to roadside assistance and emergency help via the electrochromatic rear view mirror. In August 2005, the Altise Sport model was reintroduced (V6 auto only) together with Altise Limited (four-cylinder and V6) that has additional features. The Ateva model had an interior upgrade to leather trim and rear passenger air conditioning vents. The Altise was repositioned as a fleet model and the manual transmission was no longer available on V6 Sportivo models from January 2006 production. Automatic Camrys in Australia still used the dated four-speed because it retained the 3.0 V6 engine.

A number of milestones were achieved with this generation's Camry in Australia. The one millionth Camry (Black Azura) built in Australia in September 2004 and 10 millionth Camry worldwide rolled off the production line at Altona in October 2005. More than 90% of Australian Camry exports are left-hand drive vehicles to Middle East countries including Saudi Arabia, Kuwait, Bahrain, Oman, Qatar and the United Arab Emirates. Overseas demand for the Australian-made Camry was still running at record levels, despite the release of an all-new model in mid-2006.

=== Middle East ===
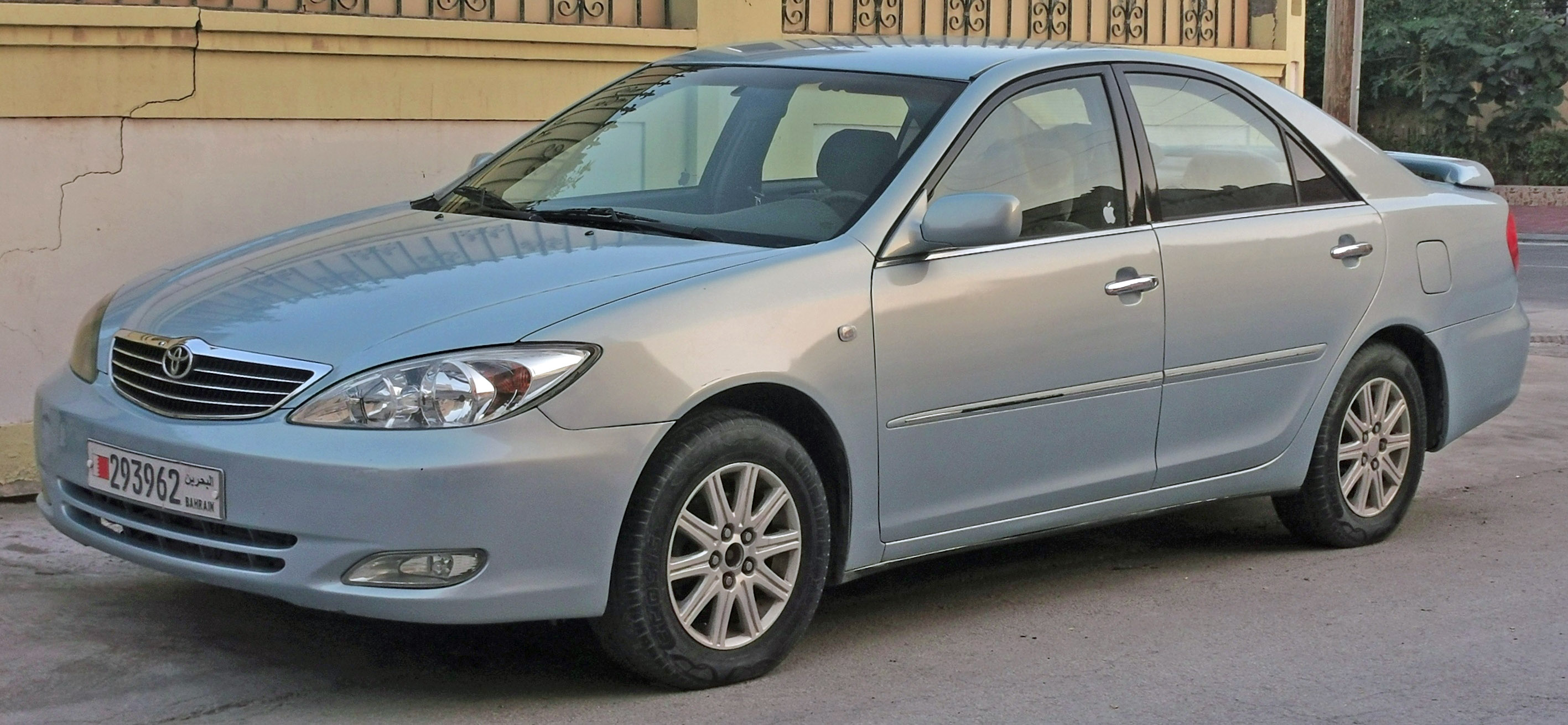

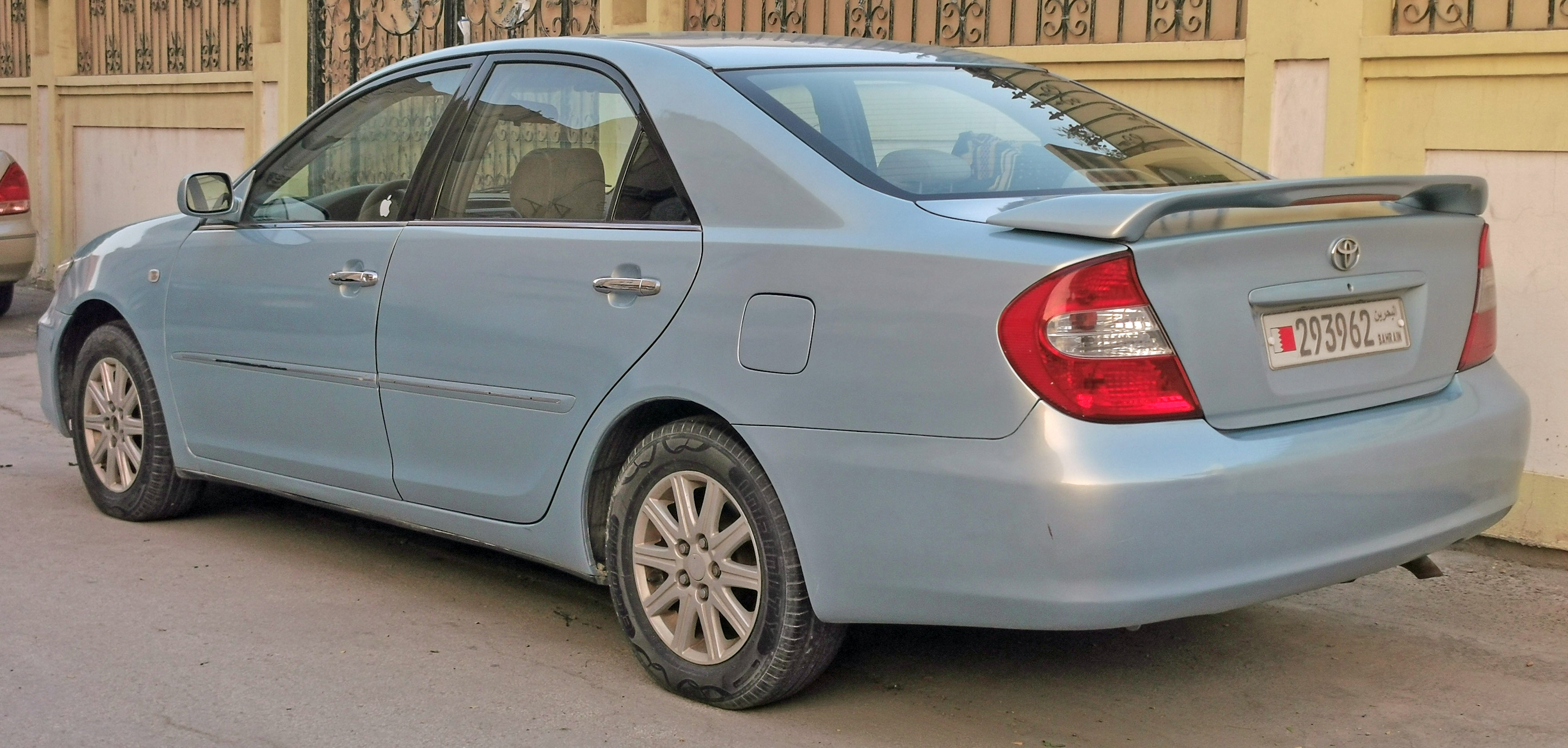
Pre-facelift Toyota Camry GLi (Bahrain)

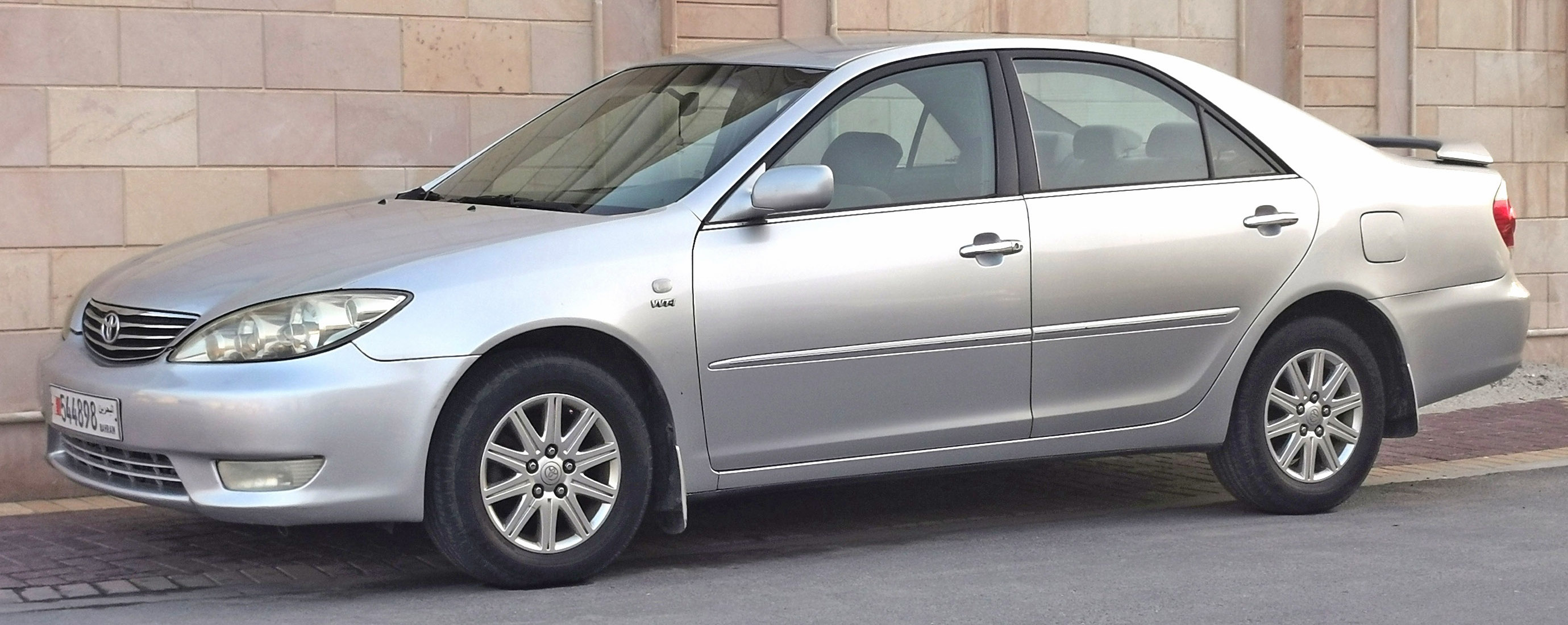

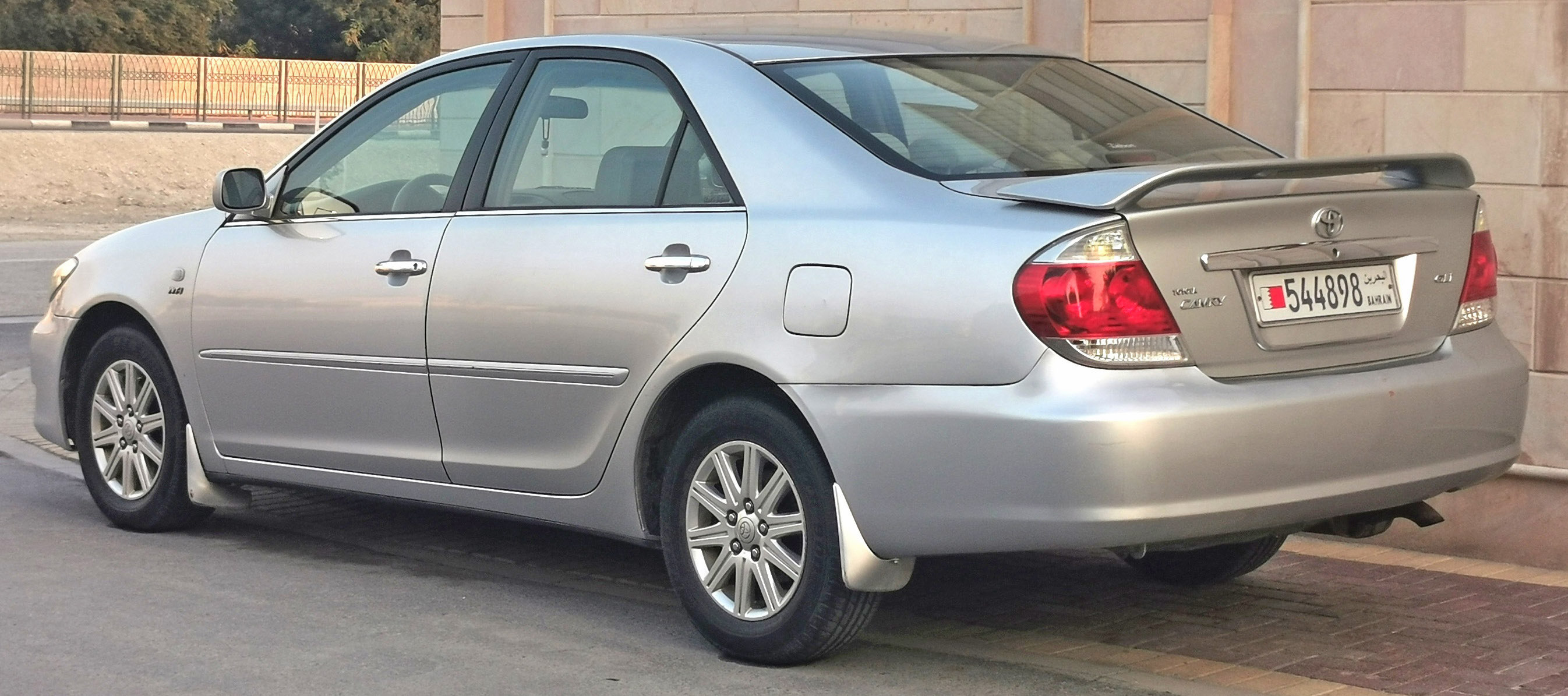
Facelift Toyota Camry GLi (Bahrain)

In the Middle East, the fifth generation Camry is available in 4 variants: XLi, GLi, Touring and Grande V6. The XLi trim comes reasonably equipped and is a common choice for taxis and is the volume seller. The Camry weathers extreme heat well and is often preferred by fleet buyers looking for reliability. The GLi trim adds alloy wheels, wooden panel interior and foglamps. The Touring and Grande trims come with a 3.0 LT V6 engine.

Additionally, fifth generation Camrys were very popular in Saudi Arabia for "Tafheet" or Arab Drifting. The main objective is to drift the Camry sideways along the road (usually a long stretch of road or freeway), while sometimes even being in the flow of traffic. This is highly dangerous, as there have been instances of the rear suspension components failing and a rear wheel being lost.

=== Taiwan and Southeast Asia ===
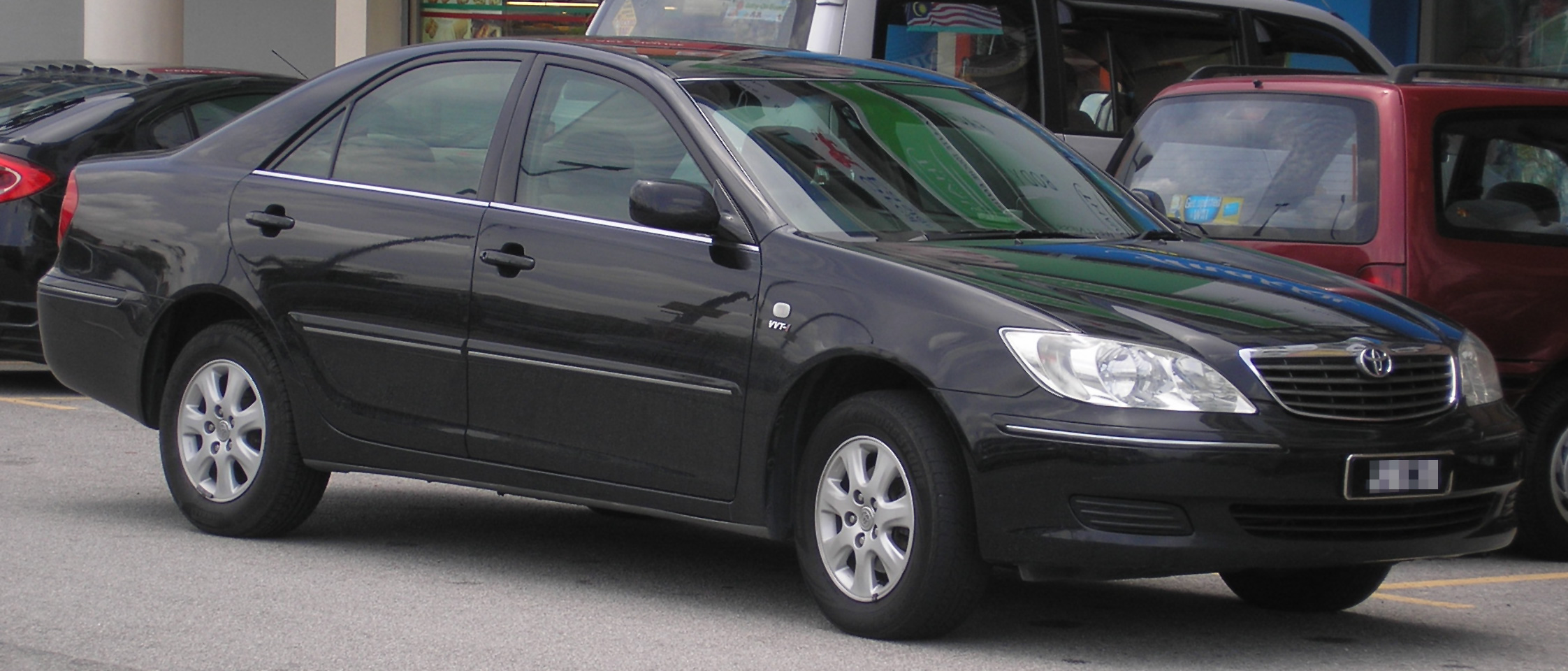

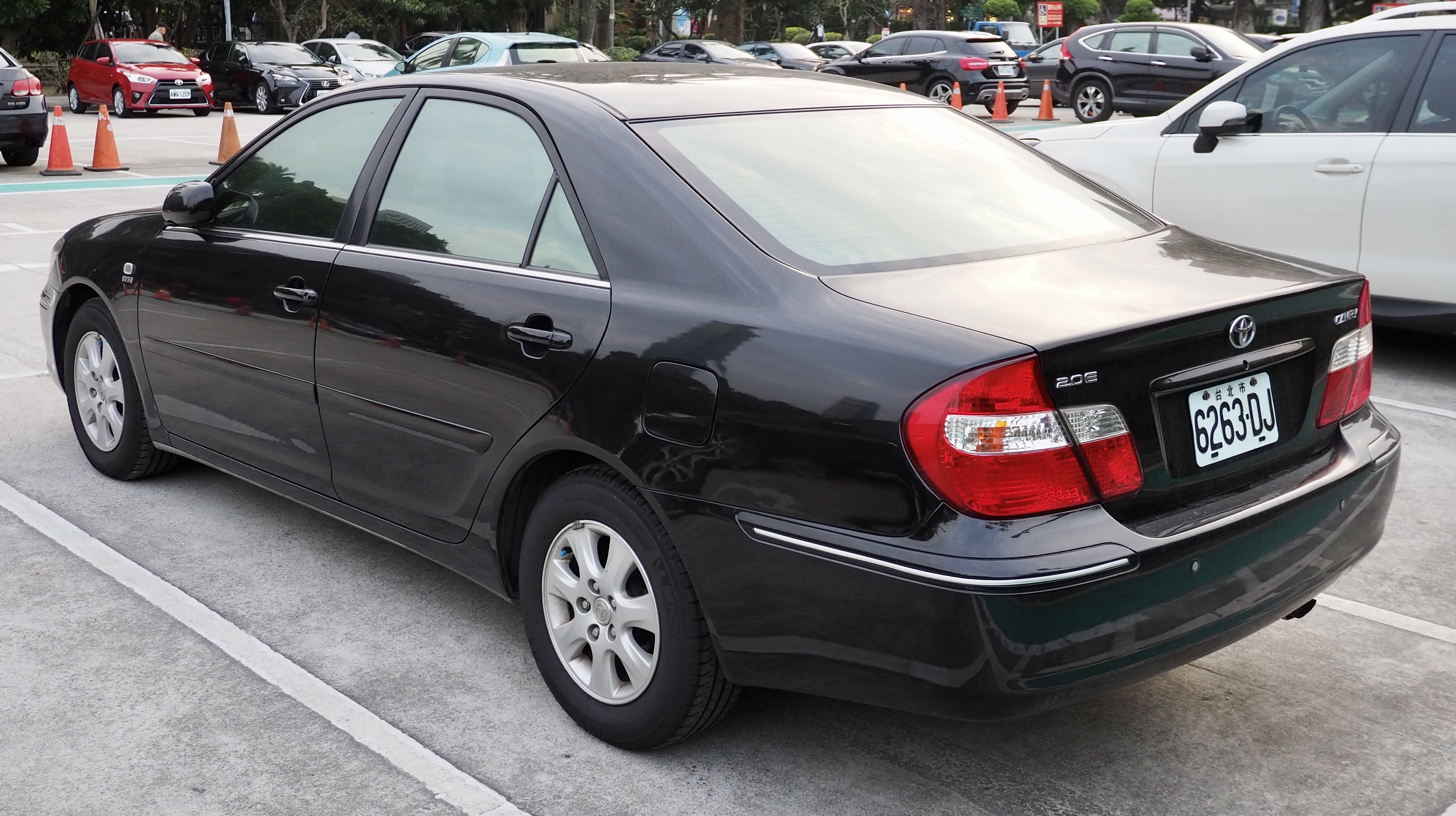
Southeast Asian/Taiwanese version (pre-facelift)

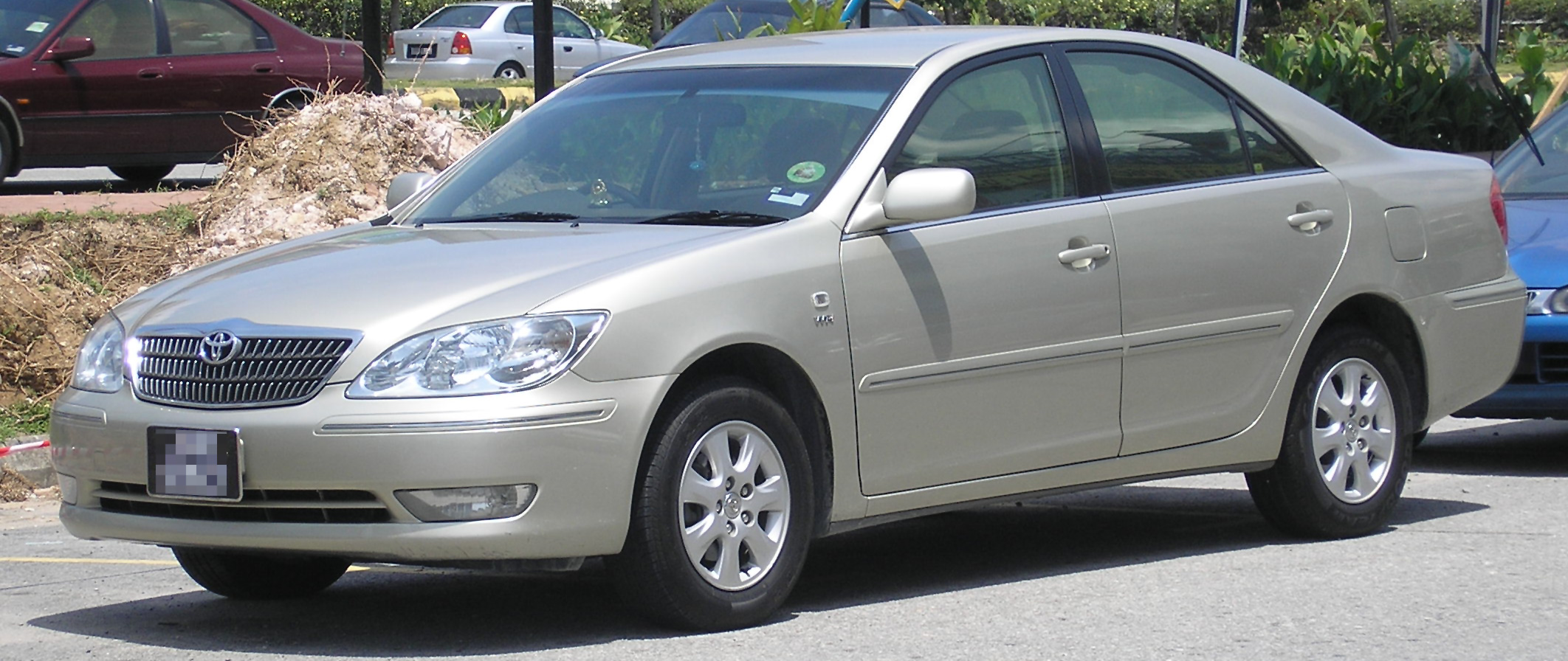

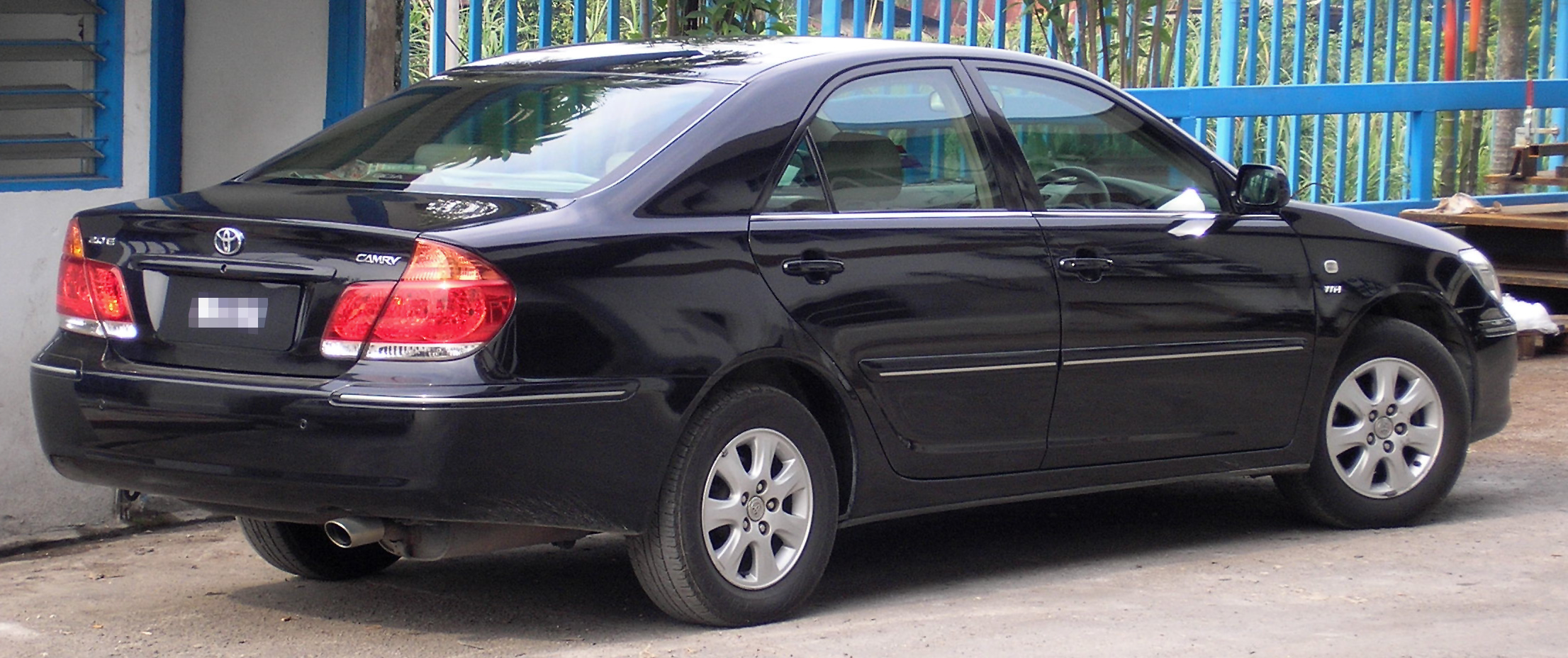
Southeast Asian/Taiwanese version (facelift)

The Camry in Taiwan and Southeast Asia of this generation looked very similar to other versions, but the front end had a "thicker" grille and larger, all-white, differently shaped headlights. The reverse lights were moved onto the trunk above the added rear fog lights and were somewhat similar to the lights on a second generation Avalon's trunk. The older models from 2002 to 2003 had tail lights with a white streak across them, while models 2004 and later did not.
