= Kengo (given name) =

- Gender: Male

Origin
- Origin: Japanese
- Meaning: Different meanings depending on the kanji used

Kengo (written: 憲剛, 健悟, 健吾, 研吾, 拳號, 堅碁, 兼悟, 謙吾, 謙伍, 賢吾 or 剣悟) is a masculine Japanese given name. Notable people with the name include:

- Kengo Hanazawa (花沢 健吾; born 1974), Japanese manga artist
- Kengo Ishii (石井 謙伍; born 1986), Japanese footballer
- Kengo Kawamata (川又 堅碁; born 1989), Japanese footballer
- Kengo Kimura (木村 健悟; born 1953), Japanese professional wrestler
- Kengo Kitazume (北爪 健吾; born 1992), Japanese footballer
- Kengo Kora (高良 健吾; born 1987), Japanese actor
- Kengo Kuma (隈 研吾; born 1954), Japanese architect
- Kengo Mashimo (真霜 拳號; born 1978), Japanese professional wrestler
- Kengo Nakamura (中村 憲剛; born 1980), Japanese footballer
- Kengo Nomoto (野本 建吾; born 1992), Japanese basketball player
- Kengo Ohkuchi (大口 兼悟; born 1981), Japanese actor
- Kengo Oshima (大島 健吾; born 2000), Japanese para athlete
- Kengo Shimizu (清水 賢吾; born 1983), Japanese kickboxer
- Kengo Tsutsumi (堤 健吾; born 1978), Japanese footballer
- Kengo Yamazaki (山﨑 謙吾; born 1992), Japanese sprinter

== Fictional characters ==
- Kengo Miyazawa (宮沢 謙吾), a character in the visual novel Little Busters!
- Kengo Asamura (浅村 賢吾), a character in the manga series Monochrome Factor
- Kengo Manaka, the main character of tokusatsu series Ultraman Trigger: New Generation Tiga
- Kengo Yozakura (夜桜 嫌五), a character in the manga and anime series Mission: Yozakura Family
