= Tsutsumi =

Tsutsumi (堤, lit. "embankment"; alternatively written 筒美) is a Japanese surname. Notable people with the surname include:

- Daisuke Tsutsumi (堤 大介, born 1974), Japanese animator
- Hiroaki Tsutsumi (堤博明, born 1985), Japanese musician and composer
- Tsutsumi Hōzan (堤 宝山), Japanese swordsman
- Kengo Tsutsumi (堤 健吾, born 1978), Japanese footballer
- Kyōhei Tsutsumi (筒美 京平, born 1940), Japanese composer and record producer
- Shinichi Tsutsumi (堤 真一, born 1964), Japanese actor
- Shunsuke Tsutsumi (堤 俊輔, born 1987), Japanese footballer
- Tsuyoshi Tsutsumi (堤 剛, born 1942), Japanese cellist
- Yasujirō Tsutsumi (堤 康次郎, 1889–1964), Japanese businessman and politician
- Yoshiaki Tsutsumi (堤 義明, born 1934), Japanese businessman
- Yukihiko Tsutsumi (堤 幸彦, born 1955), Japanese television and film director

Tsutsumi (written: 坊) is also a masculine Japanese given name. Notable people with the name include:

- Tsutsumi Otomo (小友 坊, born 1975), Japanese ice hockey player

== See also ==
- Toyota Tsutsumi plant
