= Kengo Tsutsumi =

Japanese footballer (born 1978)

Personal information
- Full name: Kengo Tsutsumi
- Date of birth: March 8, 1978 (age 48)
- Place of birth: Oita, Japan
- Height: 1.81 m (5 ft 11 1/2 in)
- Position: Defender

Youth career
- 1996–1999: Kokushikan University

Senior career*
Years	Team	Apps	(Gls)
2000–2010	Kataller Toyama		
- * Club domestic league appearances and goals

Kengo Tsutsumi (堤 健吾, Tsutsumi Kengo; born March 8, 1978) is a former Japanese football player.

== Career statistics ==
Appearances and goals by club, season and competition
Club	Season	League			Emperor's Cup		Total	
Club	Season	Division	Apps	Goals	Apps	Goals	Apps	Goals
YKK	2000	Regional Leagues			1	0	1	0
YKK	2001	Football League	29	1	—		29	1
YKK	2002	Football League	16	2	1	0	17	2
YKK	2003	Football League	28	2	—		28	2
YKK AP	2004	Football League	28	3	—		28	3
YKK AP	2005	Football League	28	2	—		28	2
YKK AP	2006	Football League	27	2	2	0	29	2
YKK AP	2007	Football League	31	1	—		31	1
Kataller Toyama	2008	Football League	24	1	1	0	25	1
Kataller Toyama	2009	J2 League	40	0	1	0	41	0
Kataller Toyama	2010	J2 League	25	1	1	0	26	1
Career total			281	15	6	0	287	15
