= Toyota Corolla =

Japanese compact car

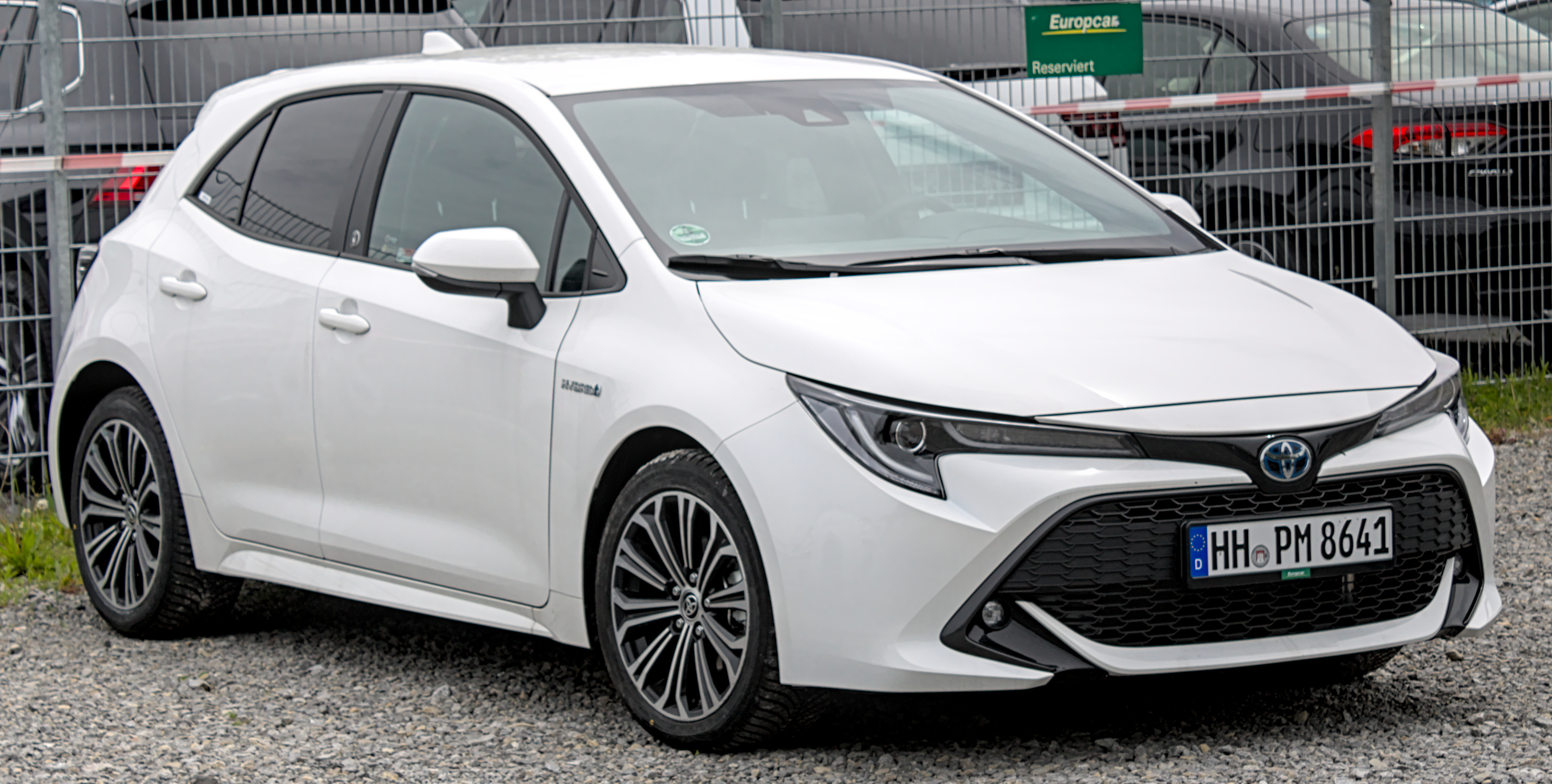
- Twelfth-generation model (E210, hatchback)

Overview
- Manufacturer: Toyota
- Also called: Toyota Sprinter (Japan, 1968–2000); Toyota Allex (Japan, 2001–2006); Toyota Auris (Japan and Europe, 2006–2018; Taiwan, 2018–2020); Toyota Levin (China, 2014–present); Toyota Allion (China, 2021–2025); Toyota Conquest/Tazz/Carri (South Africa, 1988–2006); Holden Nova (Australia, 1989–1996); Suzuki Swace (Europe, 2020–2025)
- Production: November 1966 – present

Body and chassis
- Class: Subcompact car (1966–1991); Compact car (1991–present)
- Related: Daihatsu Charmant (1974–1987)

The Toyota Corolla (Japanese: トヨタ・カローラ, Hepburn: Toyota Karōra) is a series of compact cars (formerly subcompact) manufactured and marketed globally by the Japanese automaker Toyota Motor Corporation since 1966. Since 1997, the Corolla has remained the best-selling automobile nameplate of all time, surpassing the Volkswagen Beetle. Toyota reached the milestone of 50 million Corollas sold over twelve generations in 2021, and has sold over 54 million units as of early 2026.

The name Corolla is part of Toyota's naming tradition of using names derived from the Toyota Crown for sedans, with "corolla" meaning "small crown" in Latin. The Corolla has always been exclusive in Japan to Toyota Corolla Store locations, and manufactured in Japan with a twin, called the Toyota Sprinter until 2000. From 2006 to 2018 in Japan and much of the world, and from 2018 to 2020 in Taiwan, the hatchback companion had been called the Toyota Auris.

Early models were mostly rear-wheel drive, while later models have been front-wheel drive. Four-wheel drive versions have also been produced, and it has undergone several major redesigns. The Corolla's traditional competitors have been the Nissan Sunny, introduced the same year as the Corolla in Japan and the later Subaru Leone, Honda Civic, and Mitsubishi Lancer. The Corolla's chassis designation code is "E", as described in Toyota's chassis and engine codes.

== Production locations ==
Countries and territories where the Toyota Corolla has been produced. Red indicates Japan, blue indicates countries where the Corolla is currently produced, and green indicates countries where the Corolla was formerly produced.

Toyota Corolla logo used since 2000.

Corollas are manufactured in Japan at the original Takaoka plant built in 1966. Various production facilities have been built in Brazil, (Indaiatuba, São Paulo), Canada (Cambridge, Ontario), China (Tianjin), Pakistan (Karachi), South Africa (Durban), Taiwan, Thailand, Vietnam, Turkey (Sakarya), and the United Kingdom (Derbyshire). Production or assembly has previously been carried out in Australia (Dandenong and Altona), India (Bangalore), Indonesia (Jakarta), Malaysia (Shah Alam), New Zealand (Thames), the Philippines (Santa Rosa, Laguna), and Venezuela.

Corollas were made at NUMMI in Fremont, California until March 2010. Production resumed in November 2011 at Toyota Motor Manufacturing Mississippi in Blue Springs, Mississippi.

== First generation (E10; 1966) ==
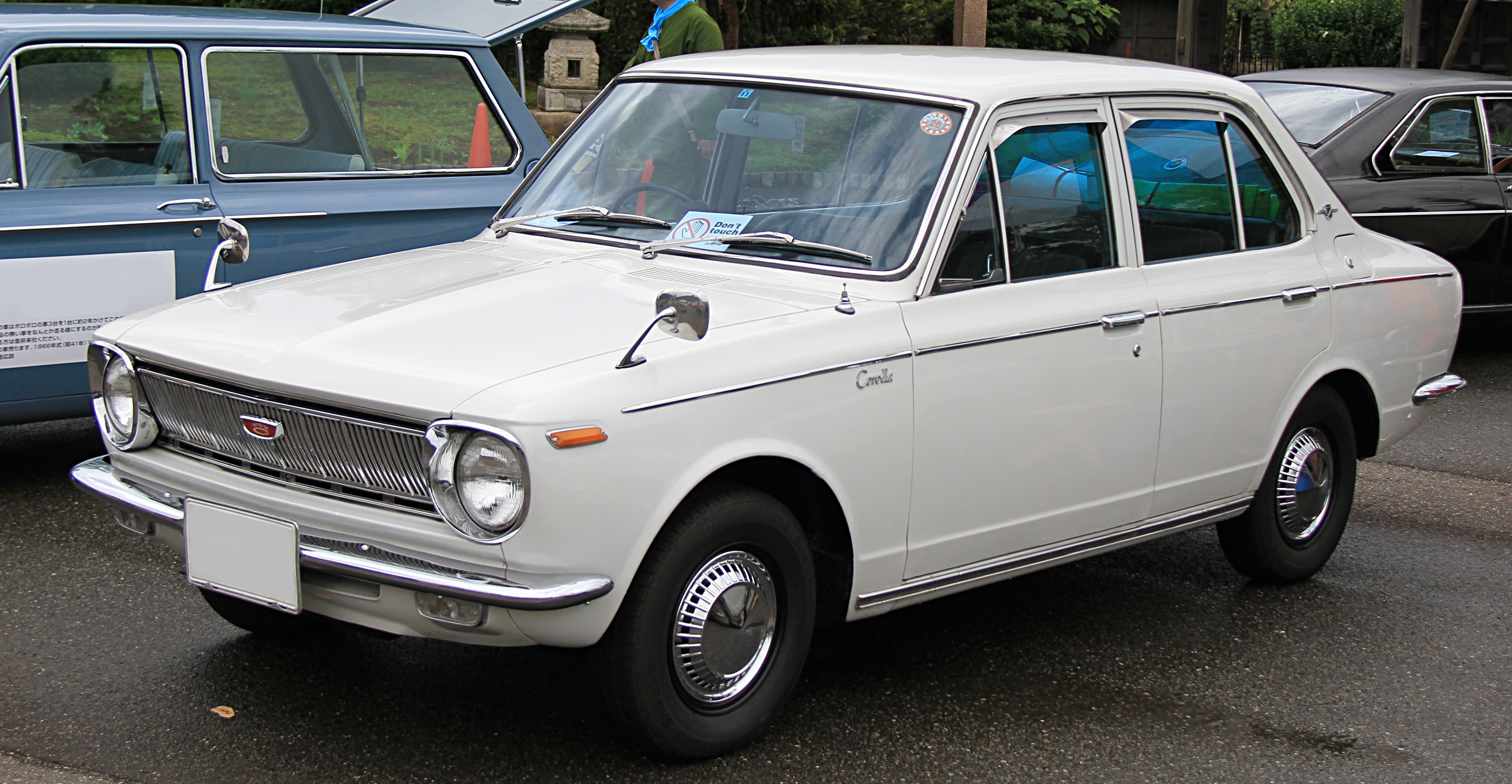

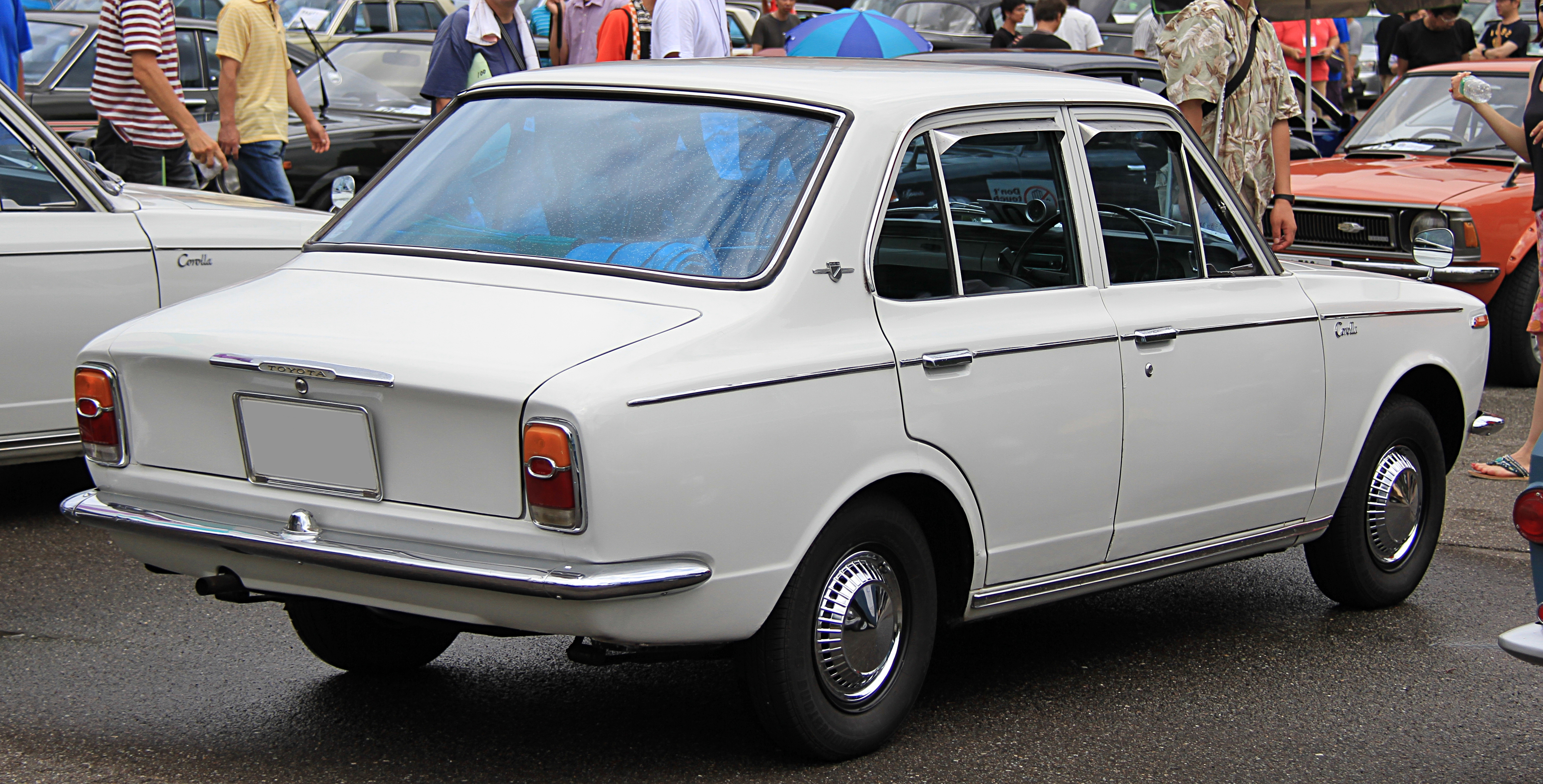
First-generation sedan

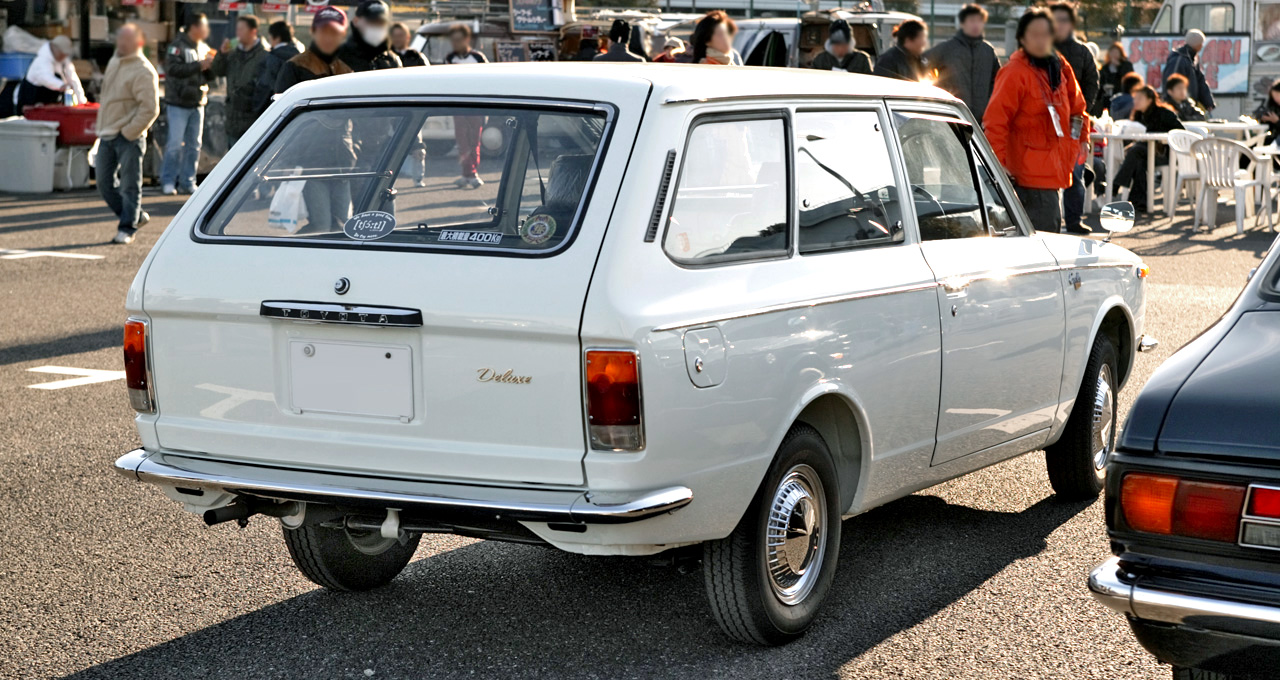
First-generation wagon

The first generation Corolla was unveiled at the 1966 Tokyo Motor Show and then introduced in November in the same year with the new 1100 cc K pushrod engine. The Corolla Sprinter was introduced as the fastback version in 1968, and exclusive to a Toyota Japan dealership retail outlet called Toyota Auto Store. It was the second car available to Japanese buyers at Toyota Corolla Store next to the smaller Publica.

== Second generation (E20; 1970) ==
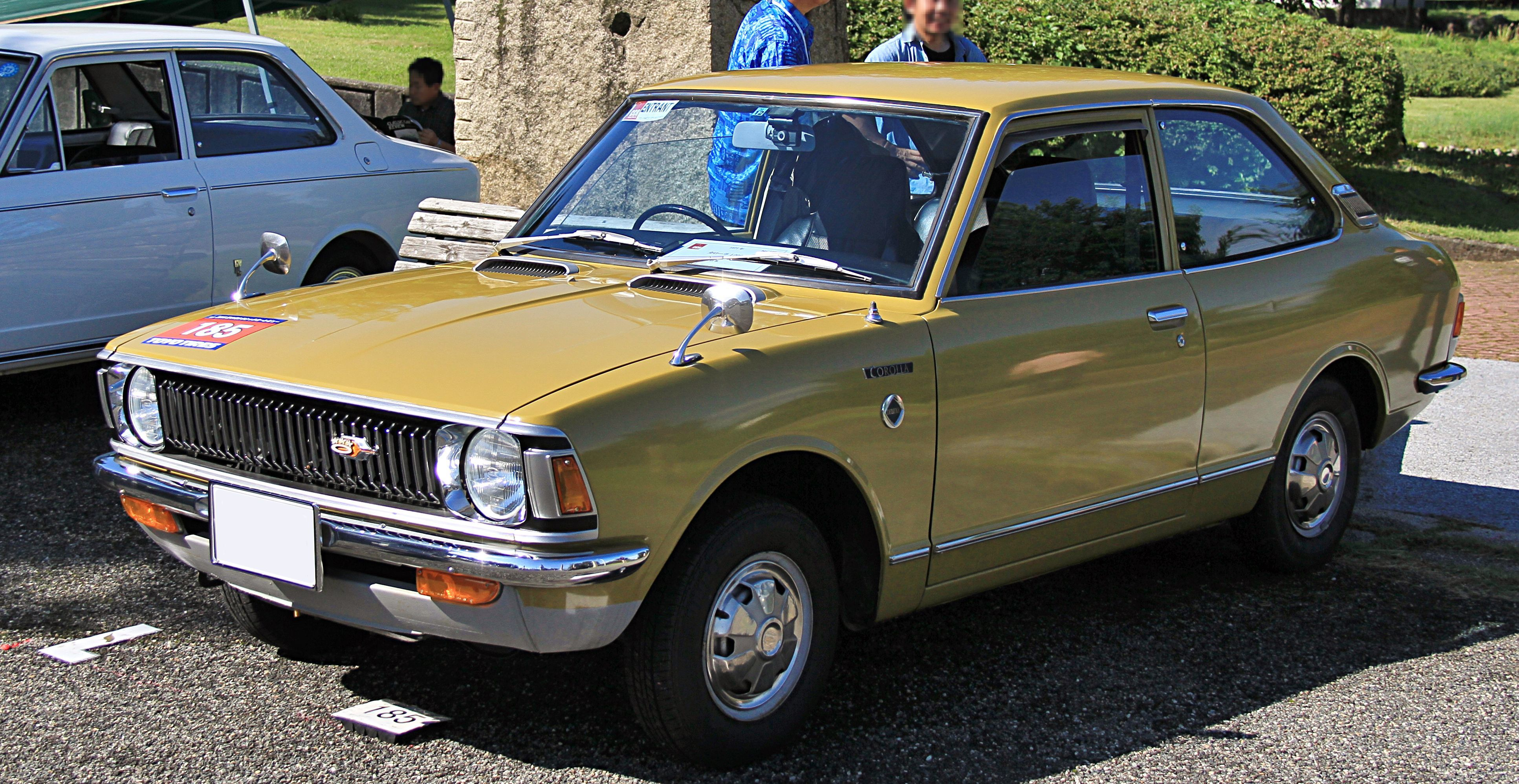

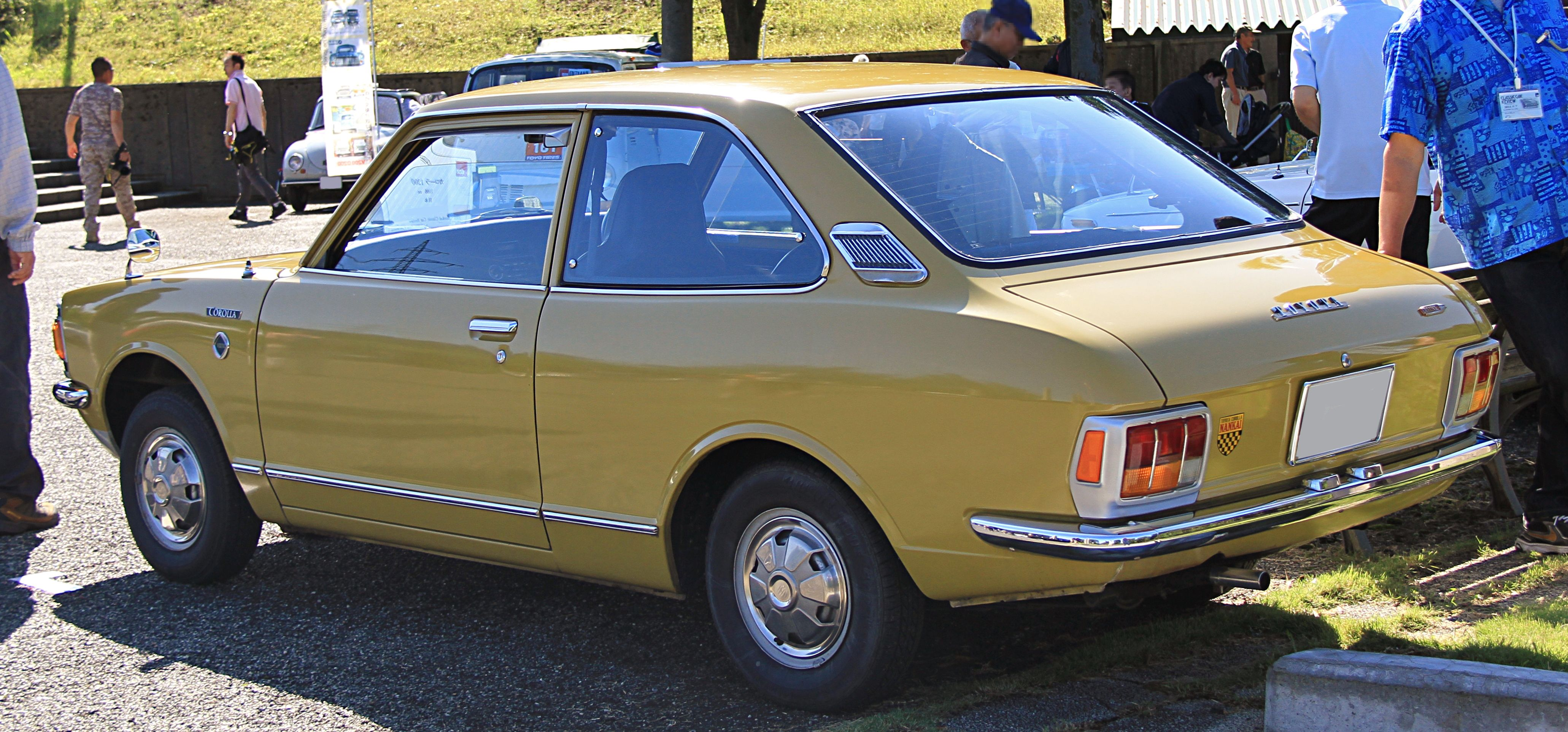
Second-generation sedan

In May 1970, the E20 was restyled with a more rounded body. The now mutually exclusive Corolla and Sprinter names were used to differentiate between two slightly different treatments of sheet metal and trim. The Corolla Levin and Sprinter Trueno names were introduced as the enhanced performance version of the Corolla and Sprinter respectively when a double overhead camshaft version of the 2T engine was introduced in March 1972 (TE27).

In September 1970, the 1400 cc T and 1600 cc 2T OHV engines were added to the range.

In Australia, only the 1.2-liter, 3K-engined KE20 was available as a two-door sedan and wagon / panelvan. The brakes were single system with no booster, solid discs on the front and rear drums. Front sway bar but no rear sway bar. Parts are not compatible with later models.

In New Zealand, the four-door KE20 was available alongside the two-door KE25 and KE26 two-door wagon respectively.

Most models stopped production in July 1974 but the KE26 wagon and van were still marketed in Japan alongside the new 30-series, until production finally ended in May 1978.

== Third generation (E30, E40, E50, E60; 1974) ==
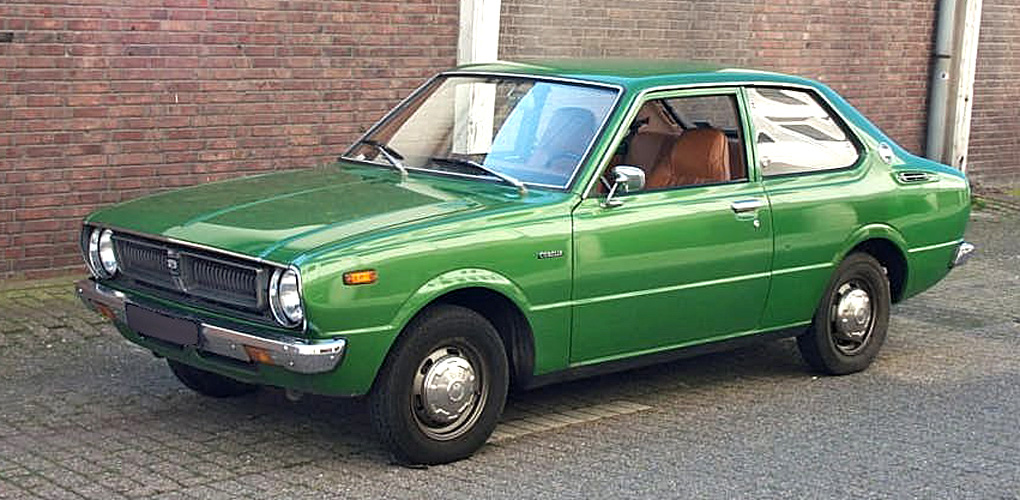
Third-generation sedan

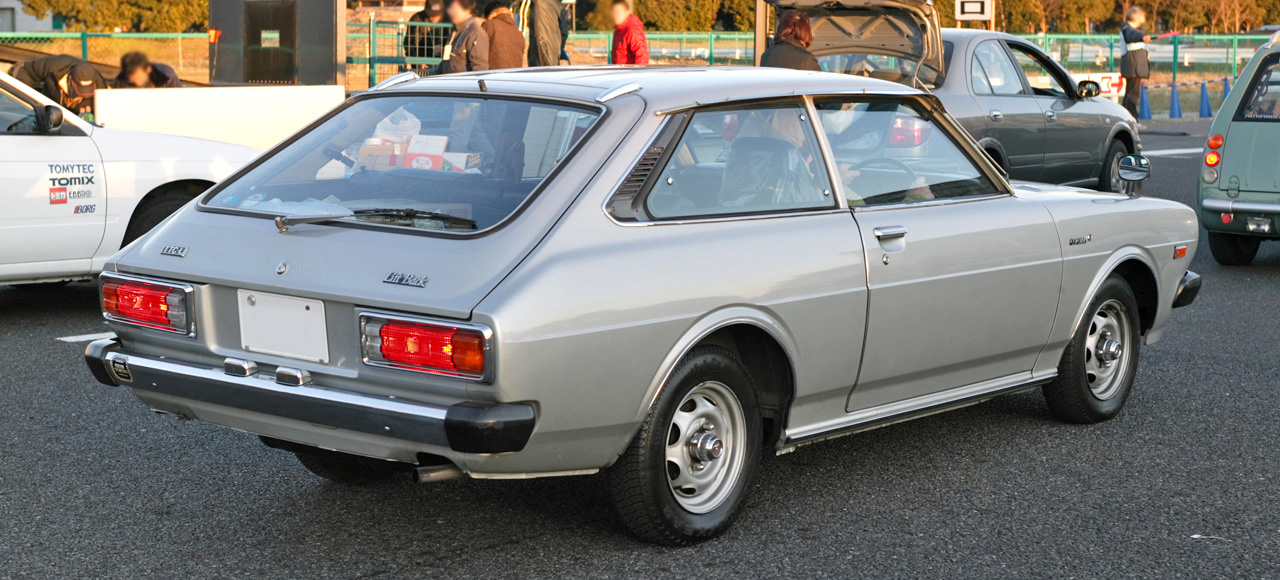
Third-generation liftback

April 1974 brought rounder, bigger and heavier Corollas and Sprinters. The range was rounded out with the addition of a two-door liftback. The Corollas were given E30 codes while the Sprinters were given E40 codes. A facelift in March 1976 saw most Corolla E30 models replaced by equivalent E50 models and most Sprinter E40 models were replaced by equivalent E60 models. The E30 Corolla was fitted with retracting front seat belts.

In Australia, the KE3x/KE5x was available as 4-door sedan (KE30/KE55), 2-door sedan (KE30), 2-door hardtop coupe (KE35/KE55), 2-door panel van (KE36/KE38), 4-door wagon (KE36/KE38) and a 2-door liftback (KE50/KE55). All KE3x models had 3K engines and K40 4-speed manual, K50 5 speed manual, 2-speed automatic or 3-speed automatic gearbox. Sprinters were not available. The KE5x models 4K engines. The KE55 was 50 kg heavier due to the addition of side impact protection in the doors, but due to a change in the body metal and seam sealing they are prone to rust. Later KE55s also used plastic ended bumper bars as opposed to the all chrome bumpers of the previous models, but included a rear sway bar for the first time. For 1978, the Toyota Tercel joined the Corolla at Toyota Corolla Store locations.

== Fourth generation (E70; 1979) ==
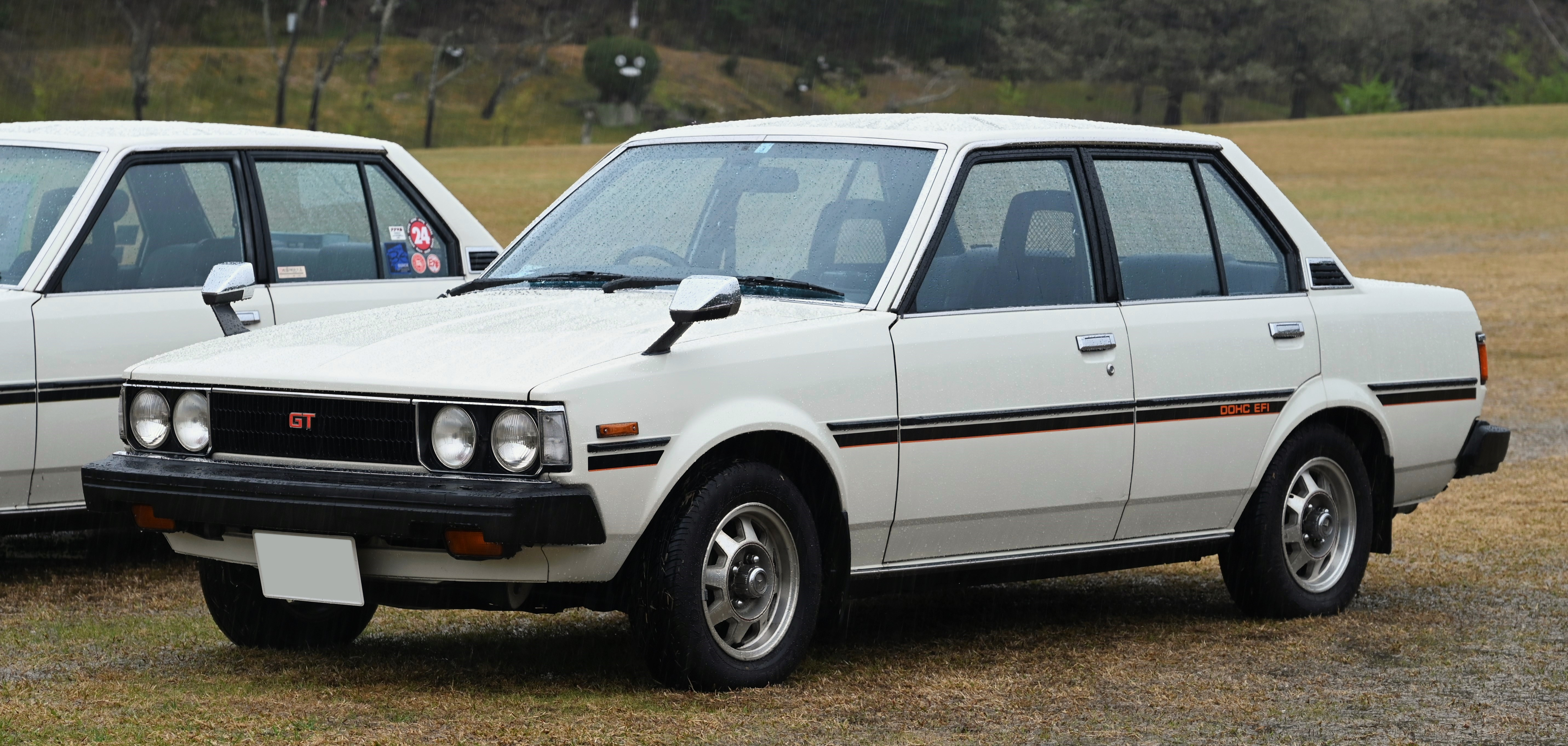

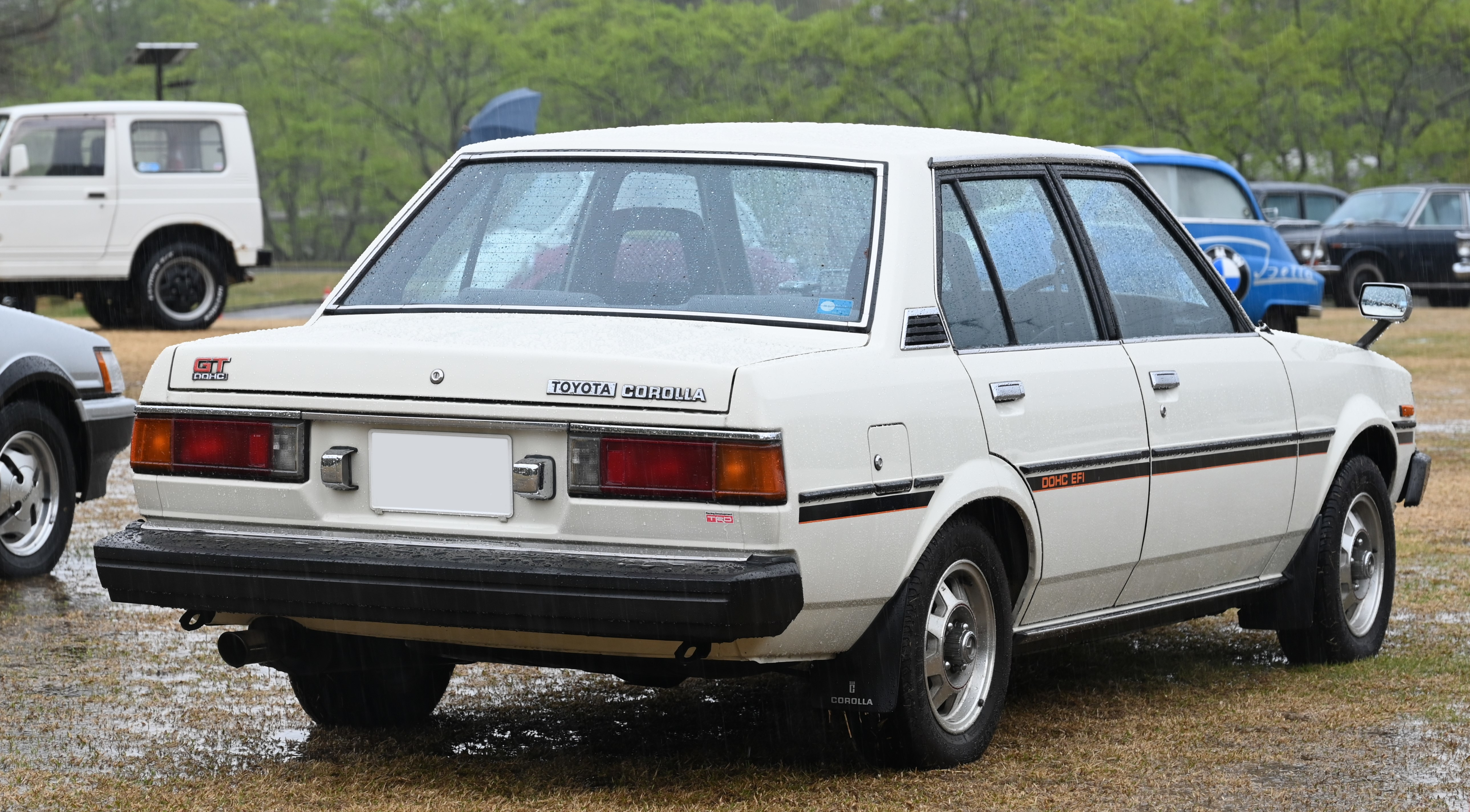
Fourth-generation sedan

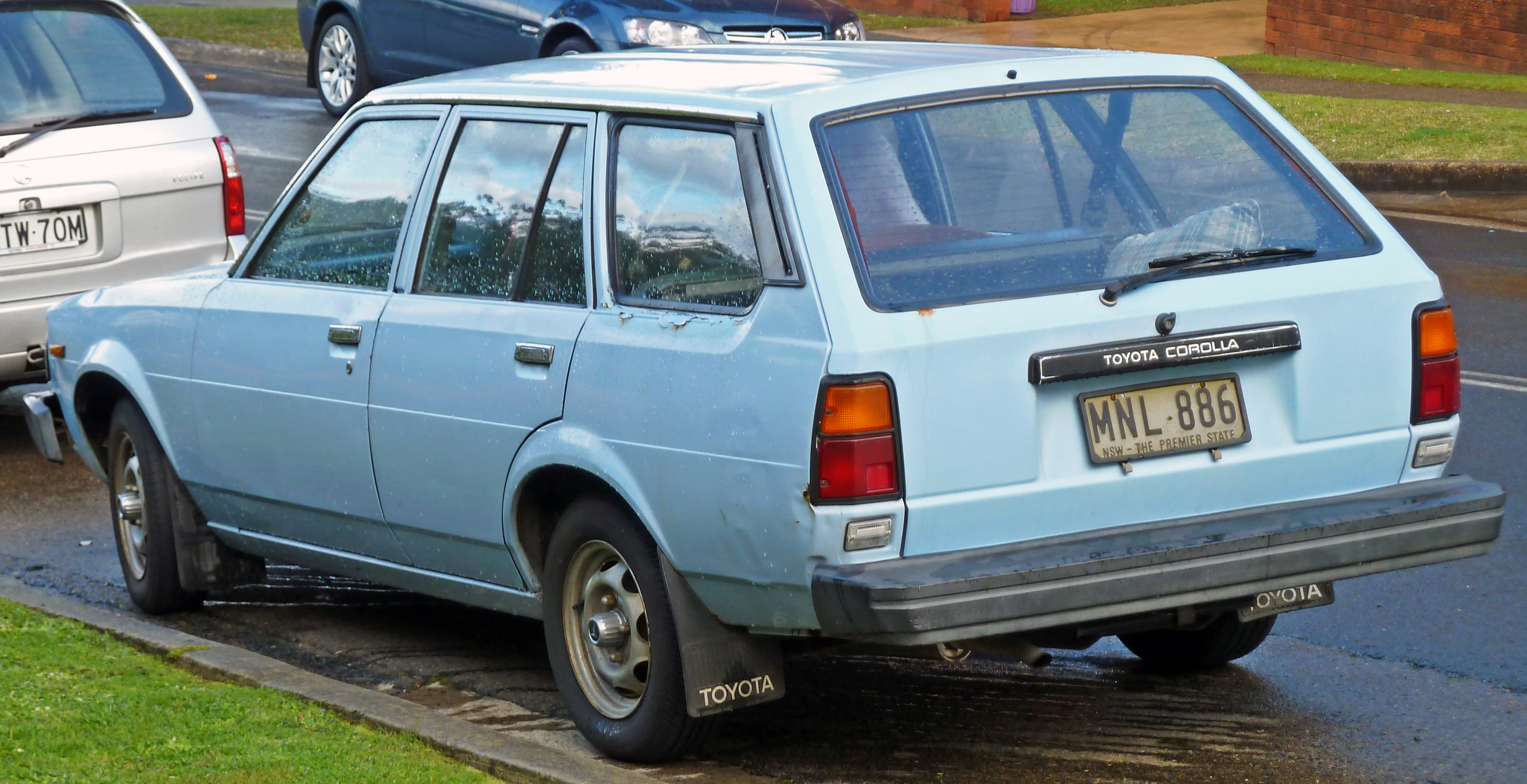
Fourth-generation wagon

A major restyle in March 1979 brought a square edged design. The Corollas had a simpler treatment of the grille, headlights and tail lights while the Sprinter used a slightly more complex, sculptured treatment. The new A series engines were added to the range as a running change. This was the last model to use the K "hicam" and T series engines. Fuel injection was introduced as an extra cost option on Japanese market vehicles.

The wagon and van continued to be made until June 1987 after the rest of the range was replaced by the E80 generation.

== Fifth generation (E80; 1983) ==
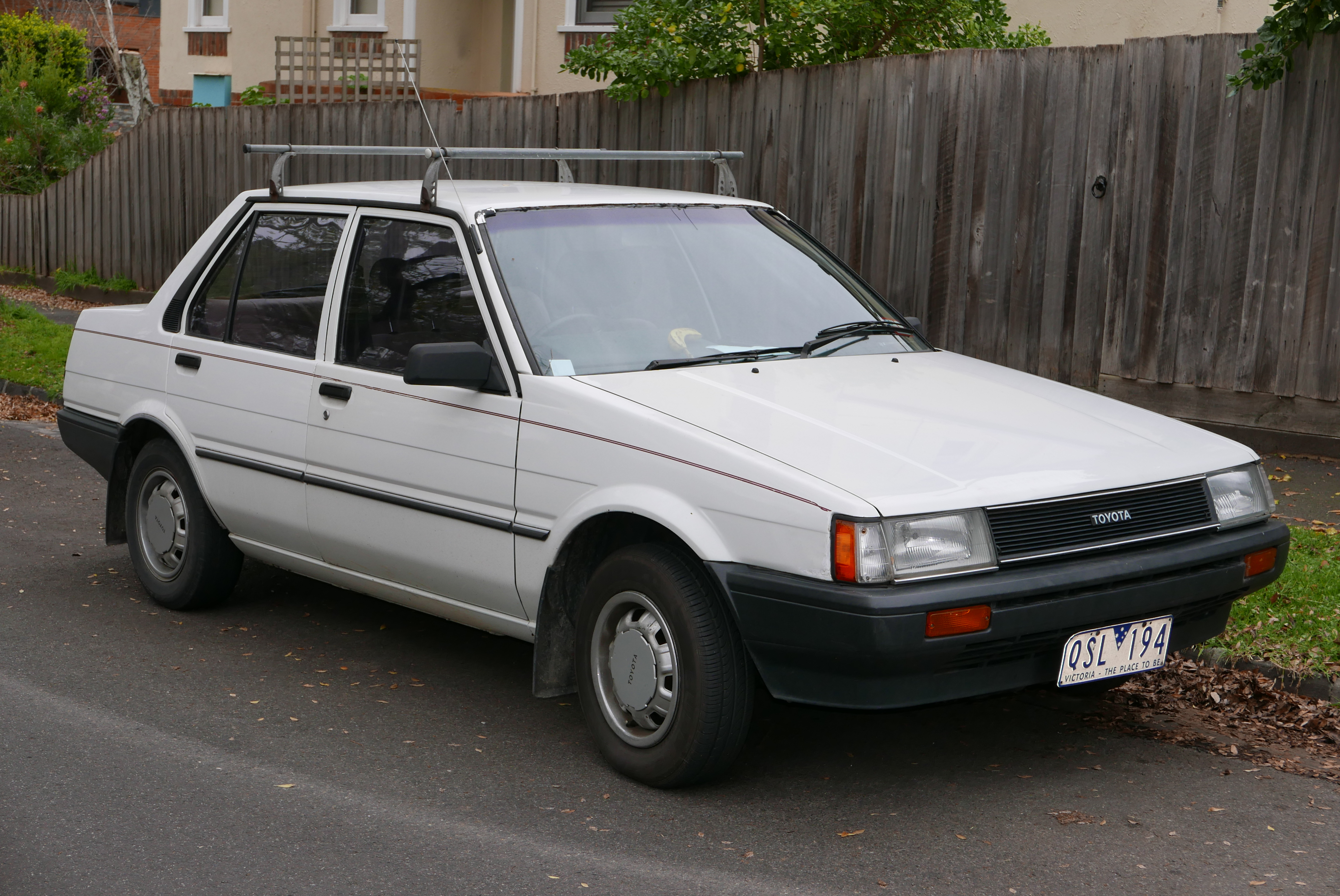

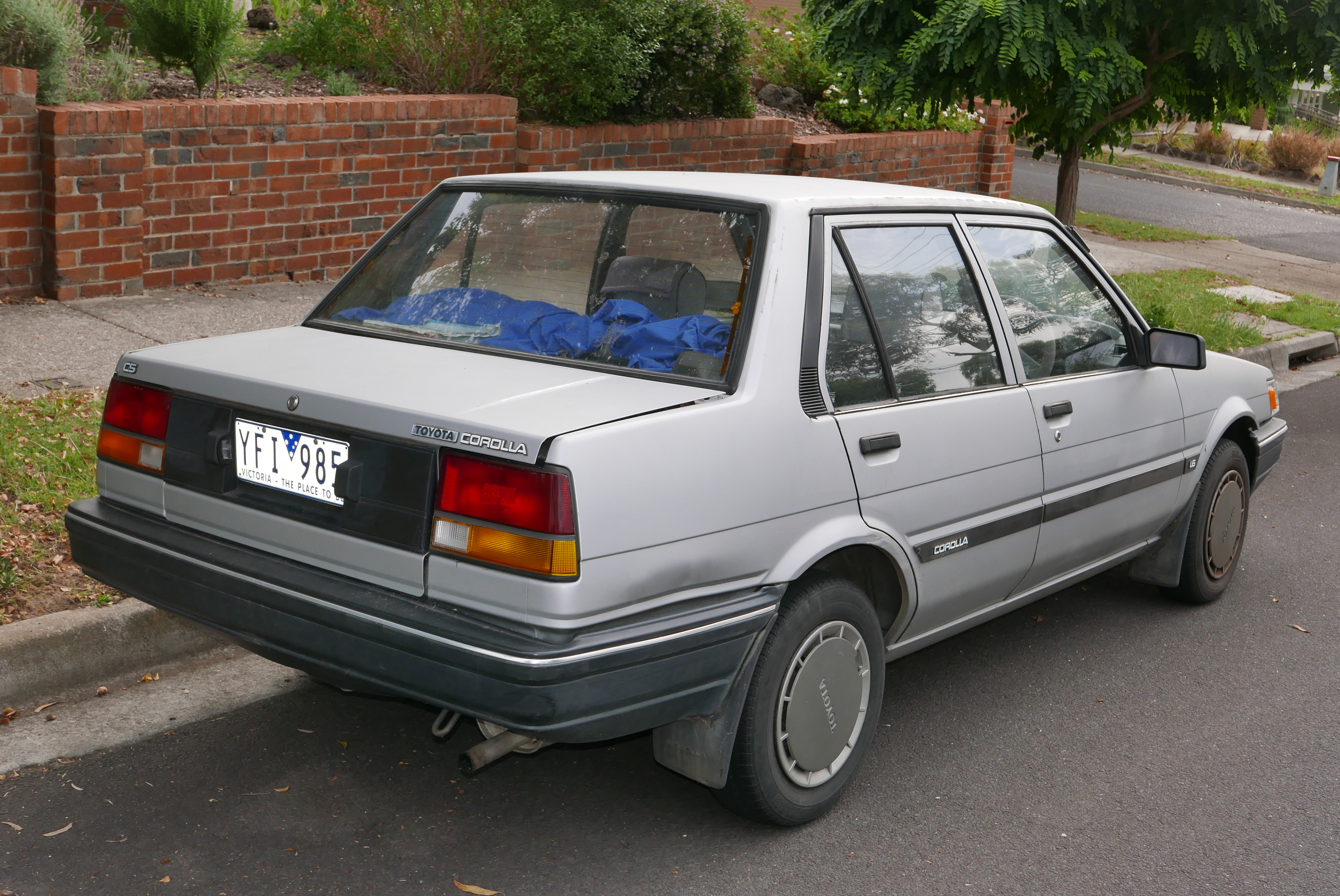
Fifth-generation sedan

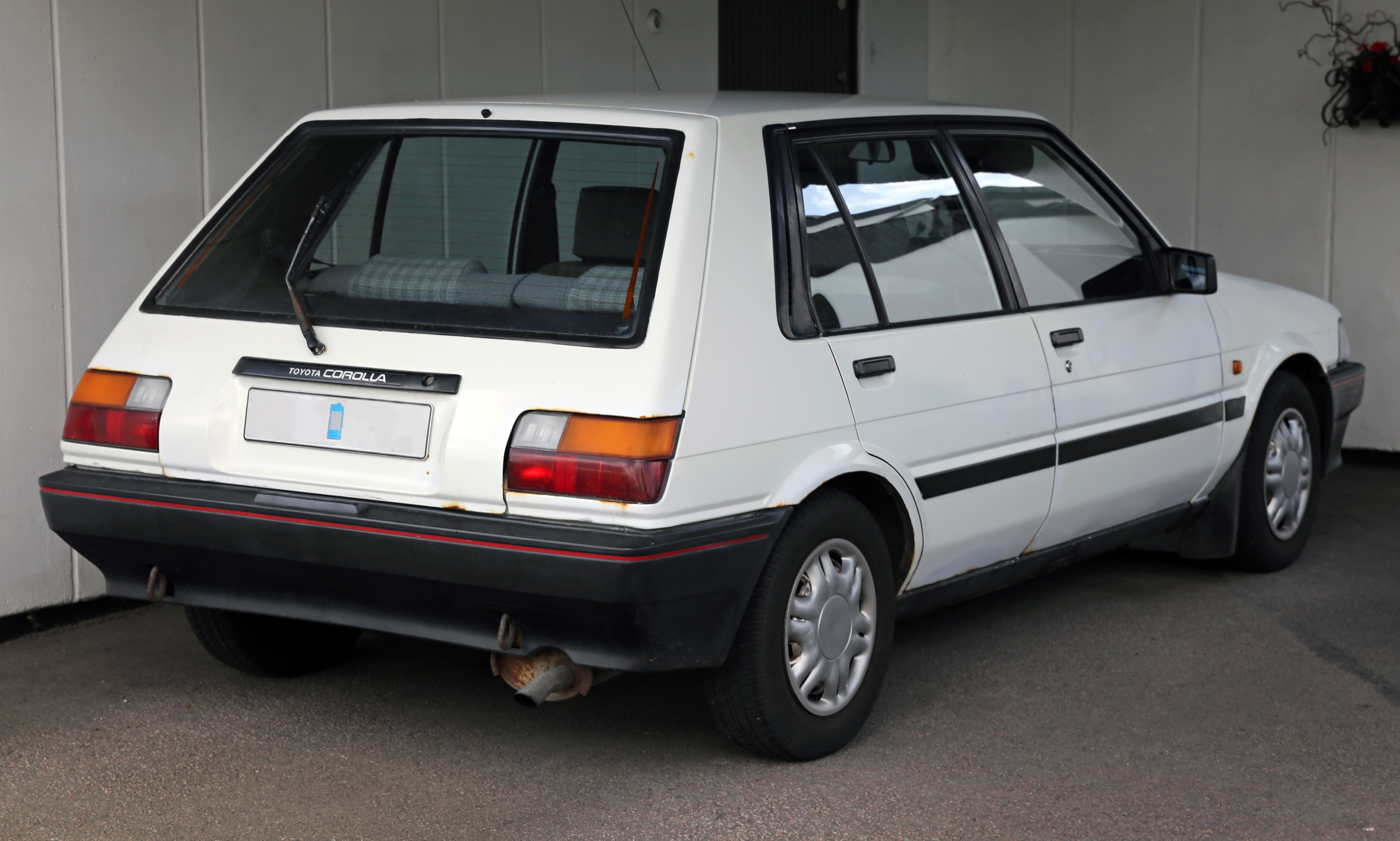
Fifth-generation hatchback

A sloping front hood and a contemporary sharp-edged, no-frills style was brought in during May 1983. The new 1839 cc 1C diesel engine was added to the range with the E80 Series. From 1985, re-badged E80 Sprinters were sold in the U.S. as the fifth-generation Chevrolet Nova. Fuel injection was introduced as an extra cost option internationally. A short hatchback and a five-door liftback were new bodystyles for the Corolla, with the hatchback added mainly to target export markets like Australia and Europe.

Most models now used the front-wheel drive layout except the AE85 and AE86, which were to be the last Corollas offered in the rear-wheel drive or FR layout. The AE85 and AE86 chassis codes were also used for the Sprinter (including the Sprinter Trueno). The Sprinter was nearly identical to the Corolla, differing only by minor body styling changes such as pop-up headlights.

This generation was made until 1990 in Venezuela.

== Sixth generation (E90; 1987) ==
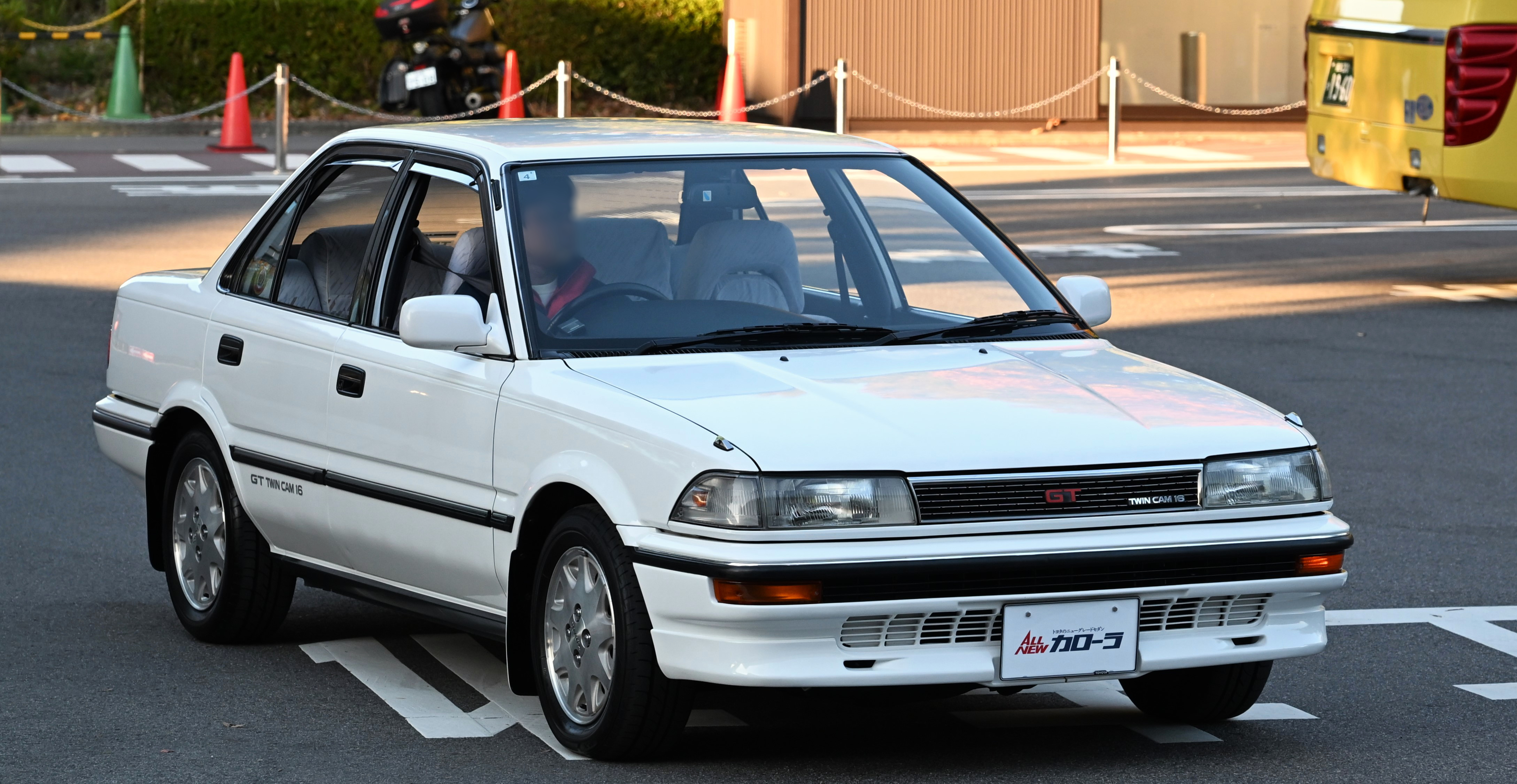

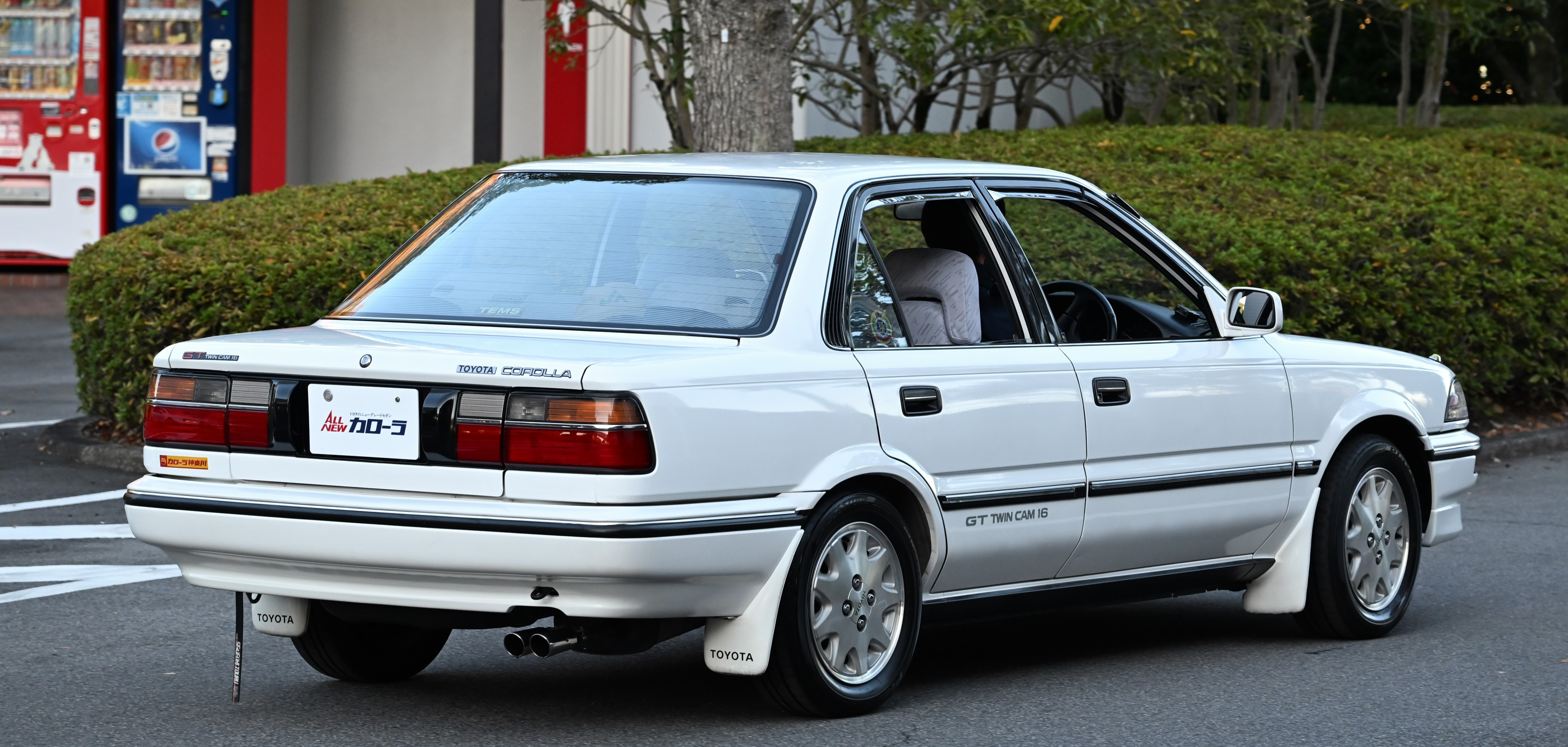
Sixth-generation sedan

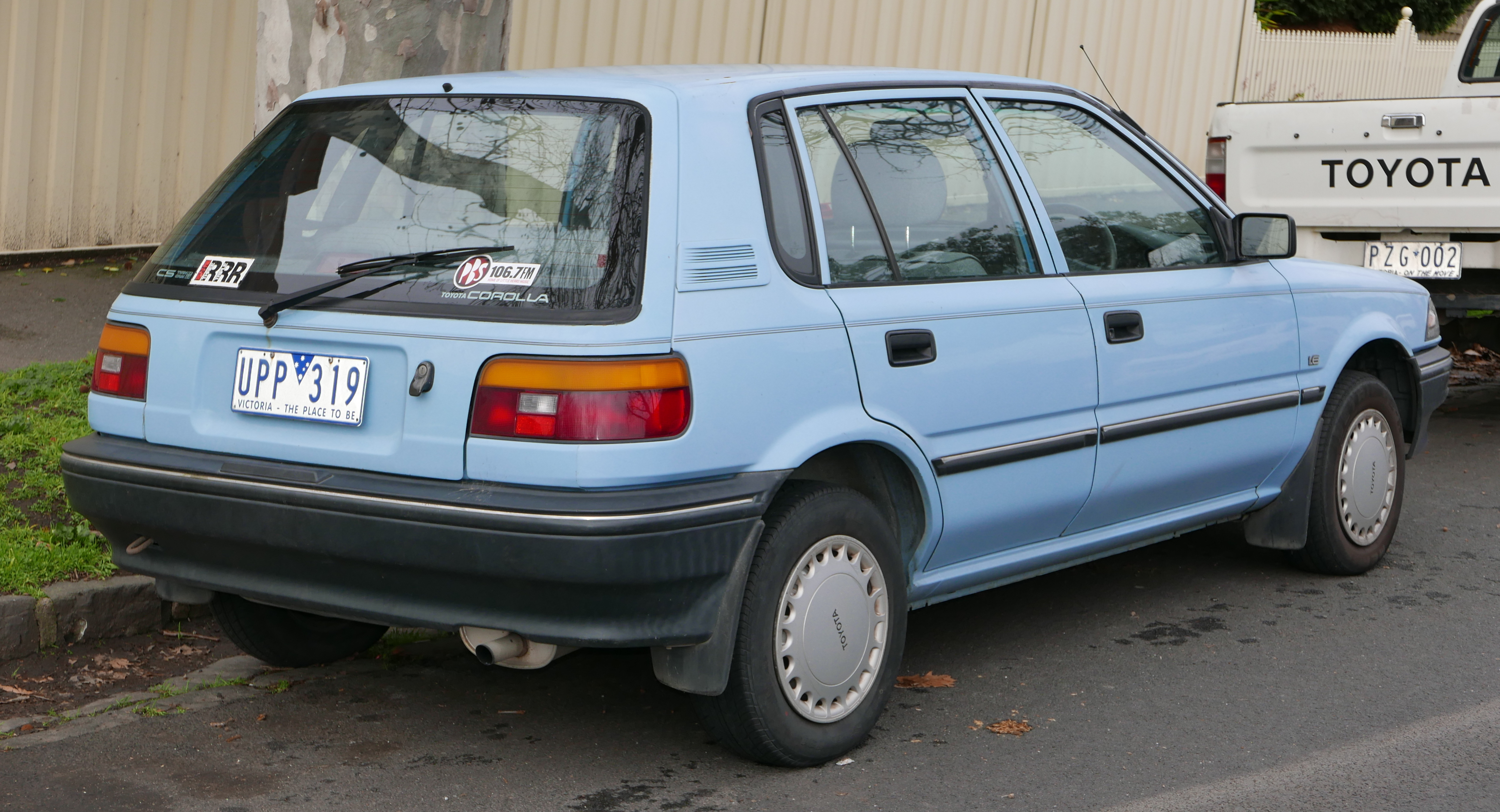
Sixth-generation hatchback

A somewhat more rounded and aerodynamic style was used for the E90 introduced on 15 May 1987. Overall this generation has a more refined feel than older Corollas and other older subcompacts. Most models were now front-wheel drive, along with a few AWD All-Trac models. Many engines were used on a wide array of trim levels and models, ranging from the 1.3-liter 2E to the 165 PS (121 kW) supercharged 4A-GZE. In the US, the E90 Sprinter was built and sold as both the Toyota Sprinter and the Geo Prizm. In Australia, the E90 Corolla was built and sold as both the Toyota Corolla and the Holden Nova.

The wagon version was released in August 1987.

In Japan, annual new car sales reached 300,008 units in 1990 becoming the highest in Japan, This record was the highest-selling Japanese car until it was surpassed by the Prius in 2010.

In South Africa, this generation continued to be built until August 2006.

== Seventh generation (E100; 1991) ==
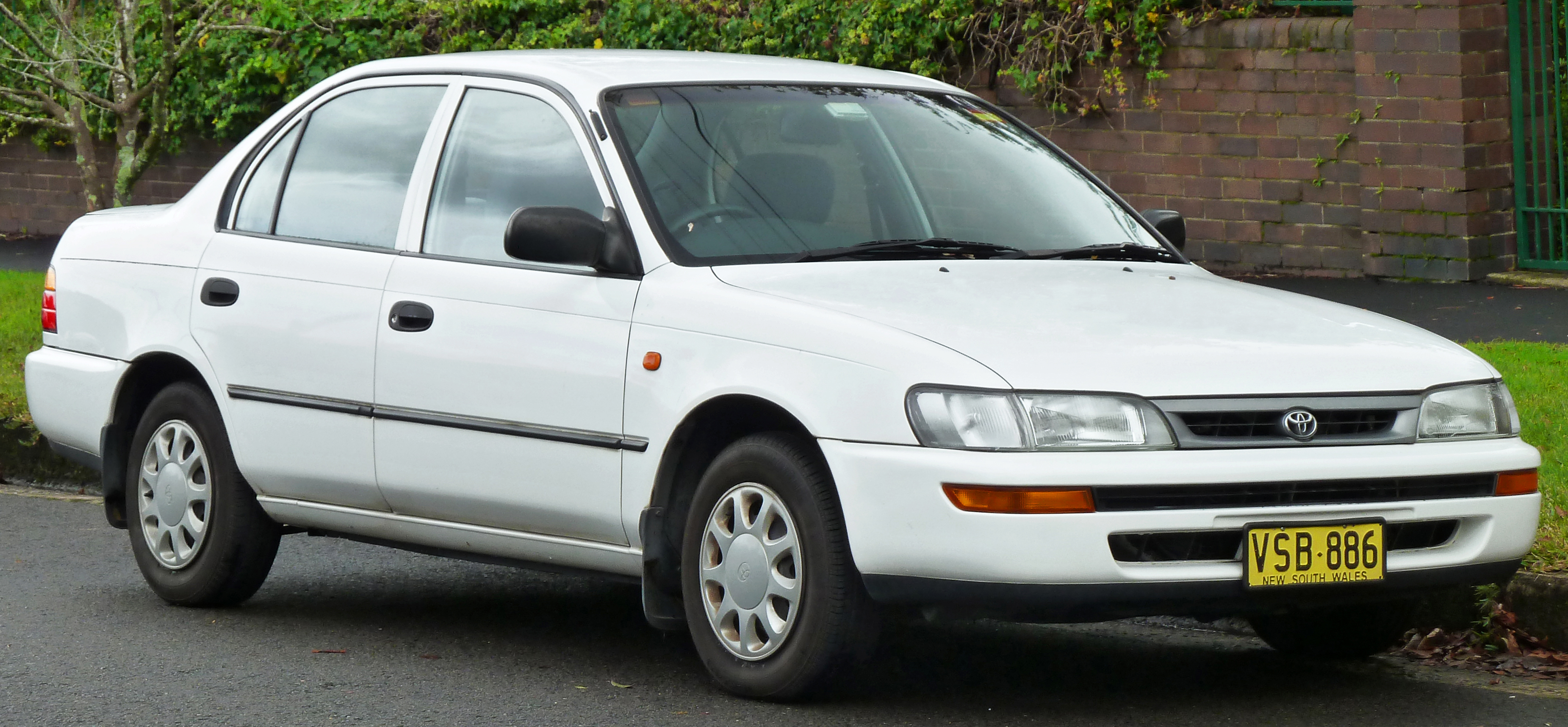
Seventh-generation sedan

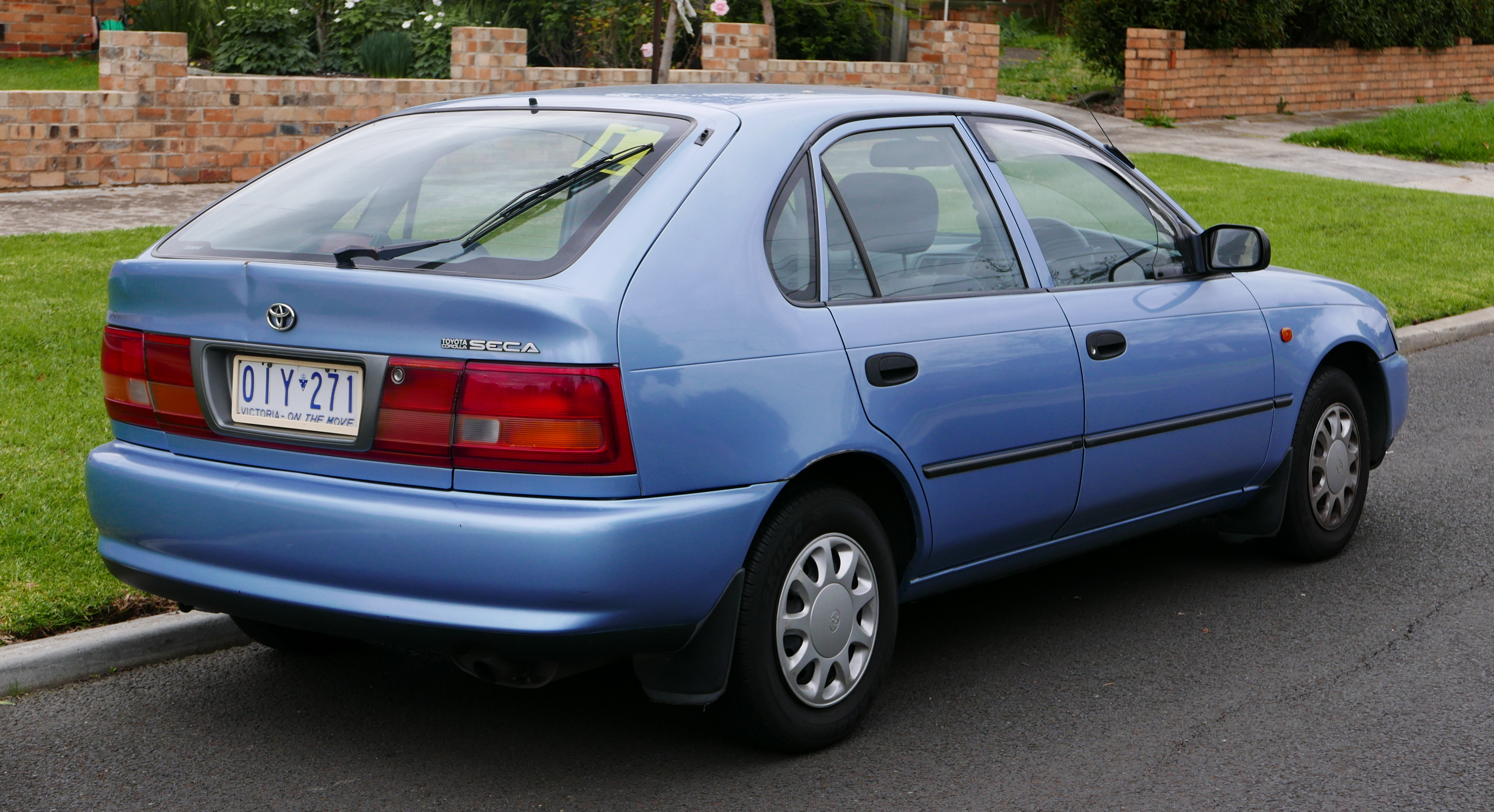
Seventh-generation hatchback

In June 1991, Corollas received a redesign to be larger, heavier, and have the completely rounded, aerodynamic shape of the 1990s. In the United States, the somewhat larger Corolla was now in the compact class, rather than subcompact, and the coupé was still available in some markets, known as the AE101 Corolla Levin. Carburetors were mostly retired with this generation.

Production of most models ended in 1995, with the introduction of the E110 Corolla, but the wagons and vans continued to be built until 2002.

== Eighth generation (E110; 1995) ==
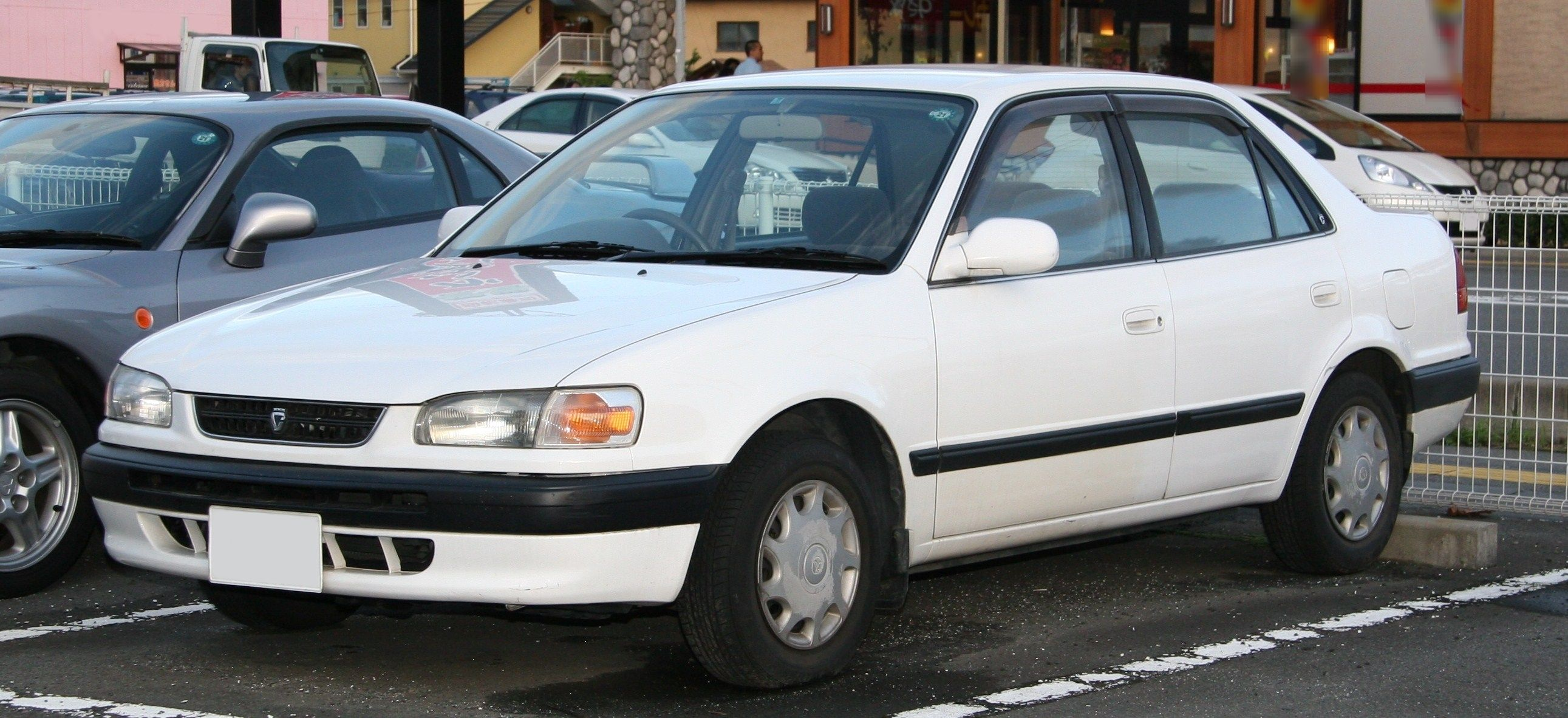
Eighth-generation sedan (Japan, Asia and South America)

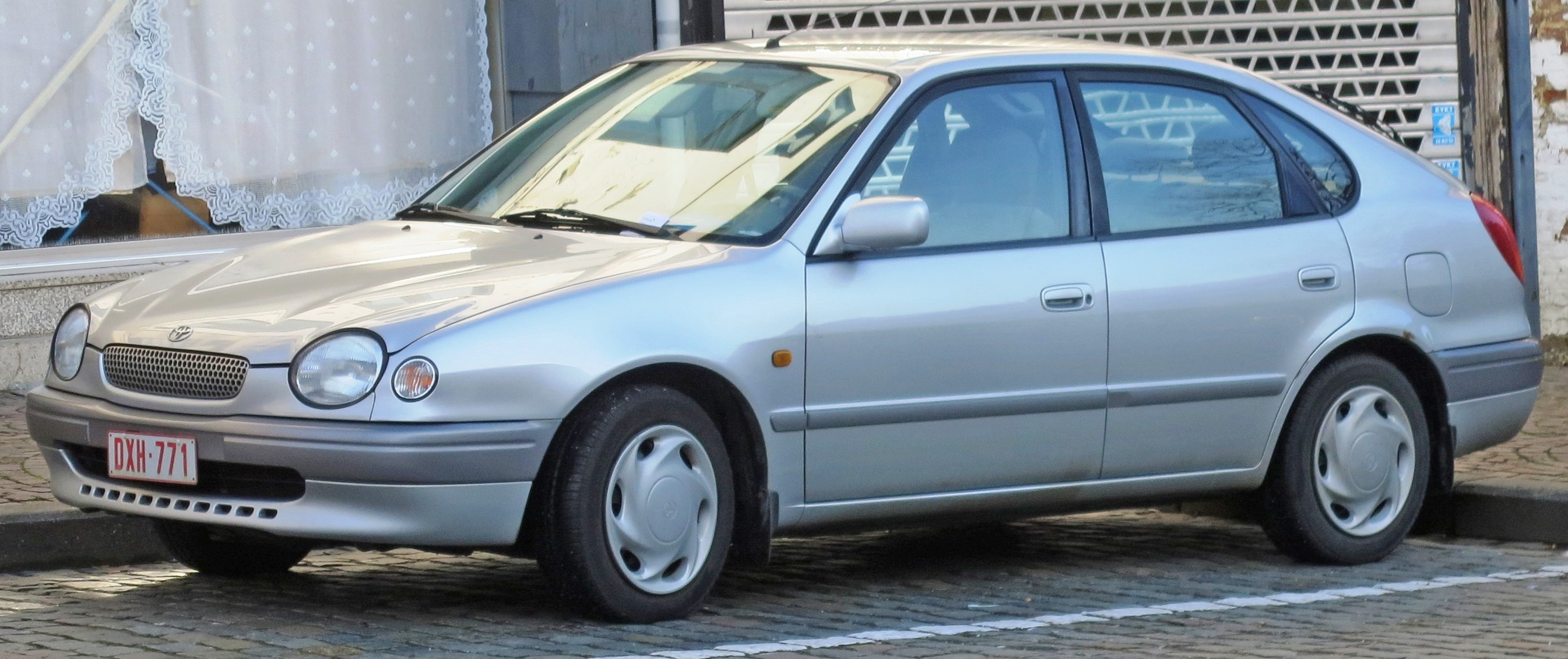
Eighth-generation liftback (Europe and Australasia)

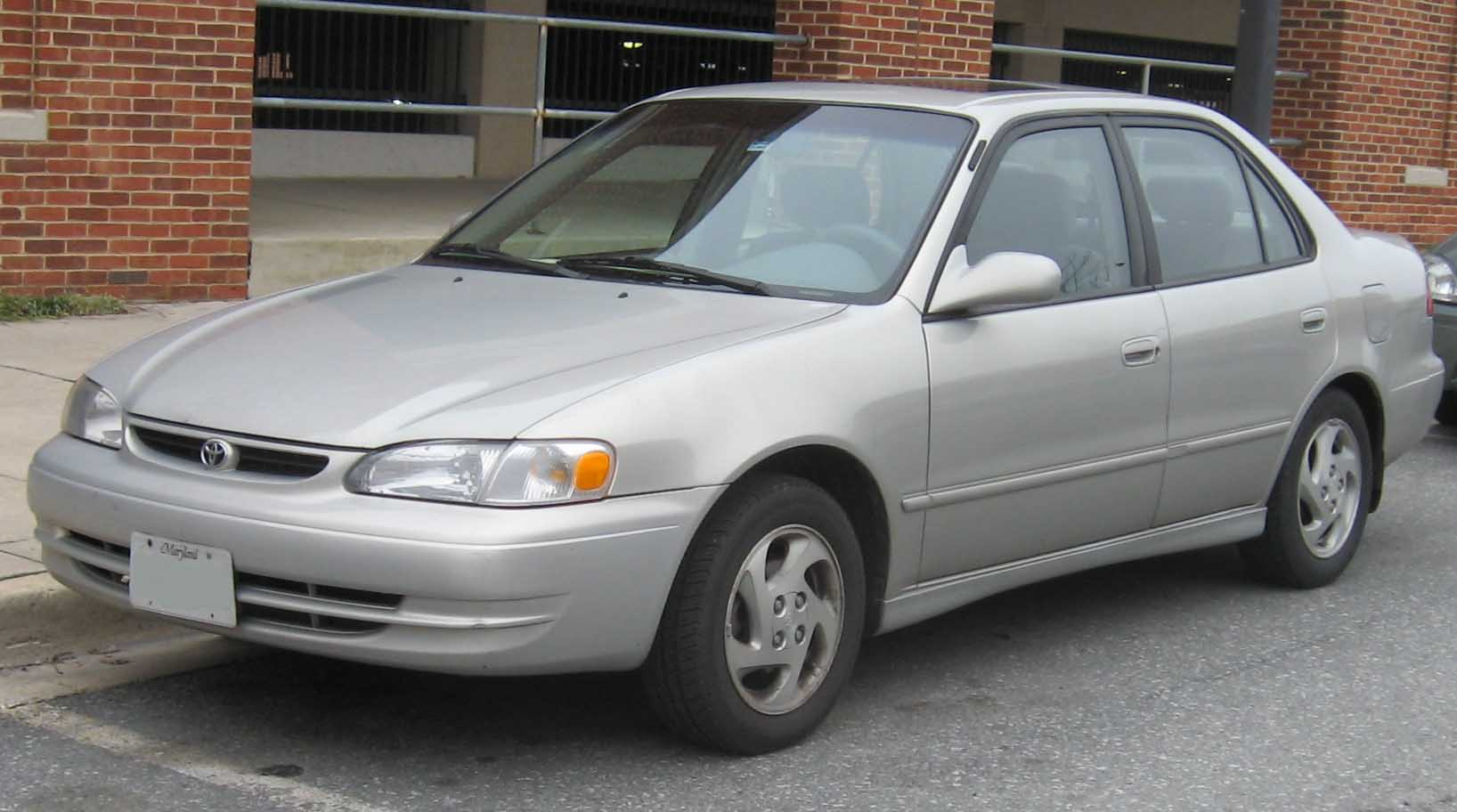
Eighth-generation sedan (North America)

Production of the E110 Corolla started in May 1995. The design of the car was slightly altered throughout but retained a look similar to that of the E100. In 1998, for the first time, some non-Japanese Corollas received the new 1ZZ-FE engine. The 1ZZ-FE engine had an aluminum engine block and aluminum cylinder heads, which made models powered by this motor lighter than versions powered by A series engines which had cast iron blocks with aluminum heads. The model range began to change as Toyota decided styling differences would improve sales in different markets. Starting with this generation, General Motors renamed the Geo Prizm, a rebadge of the Toyota Sprinter, as the Chevrolet Prizm when the Geo brand was discontinued.

This generation was delayed in North America until mid-1997 (US 1998 model year), where it had unique front and rear styling. Europe and Australasia received versions of their own as well. In Pakistan, this model was halted in November 1998, while production was closed in March 2002.

== Ninth generation (E120, E130; 2000) ==
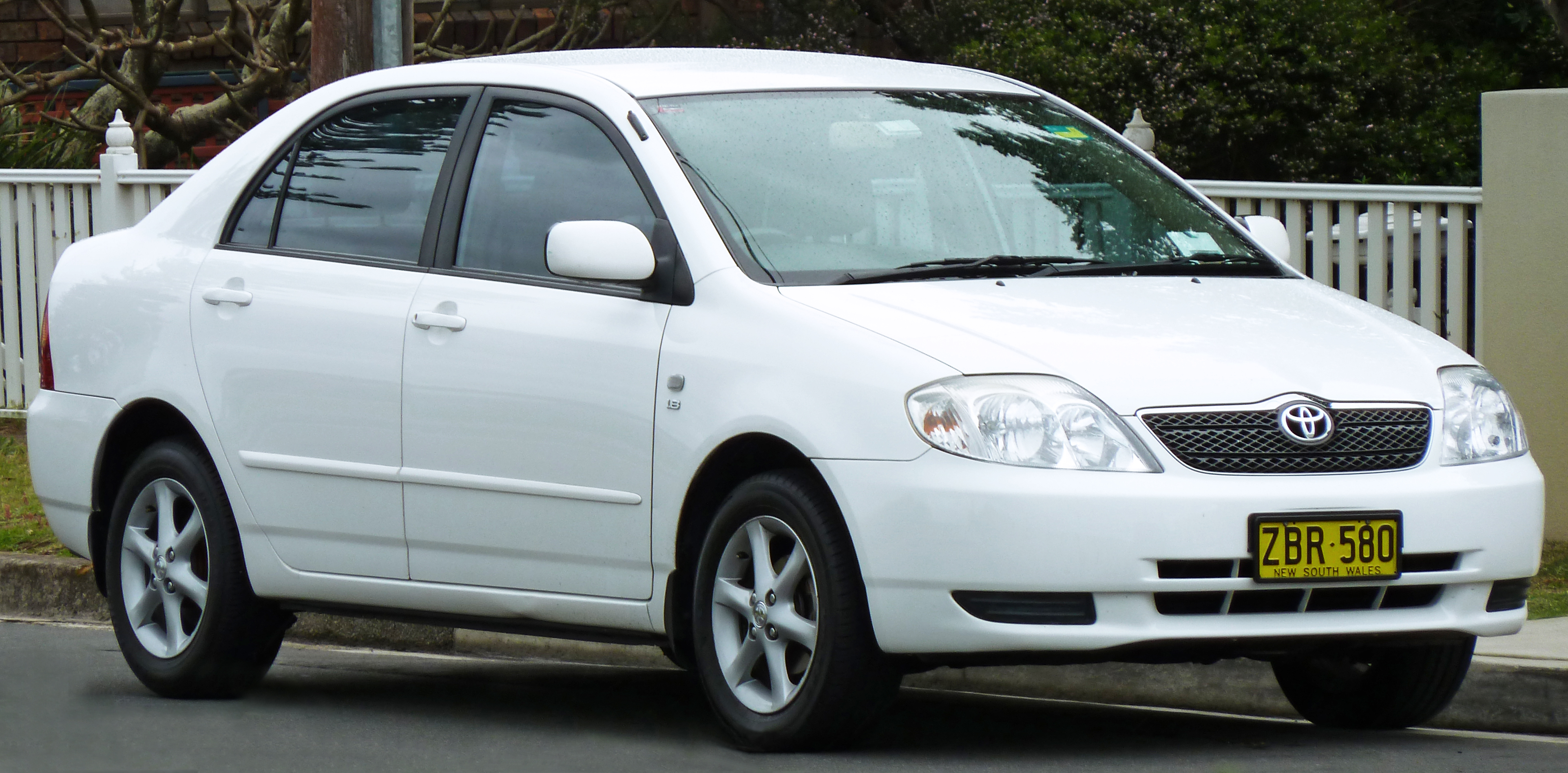
Ninth-generation sedan

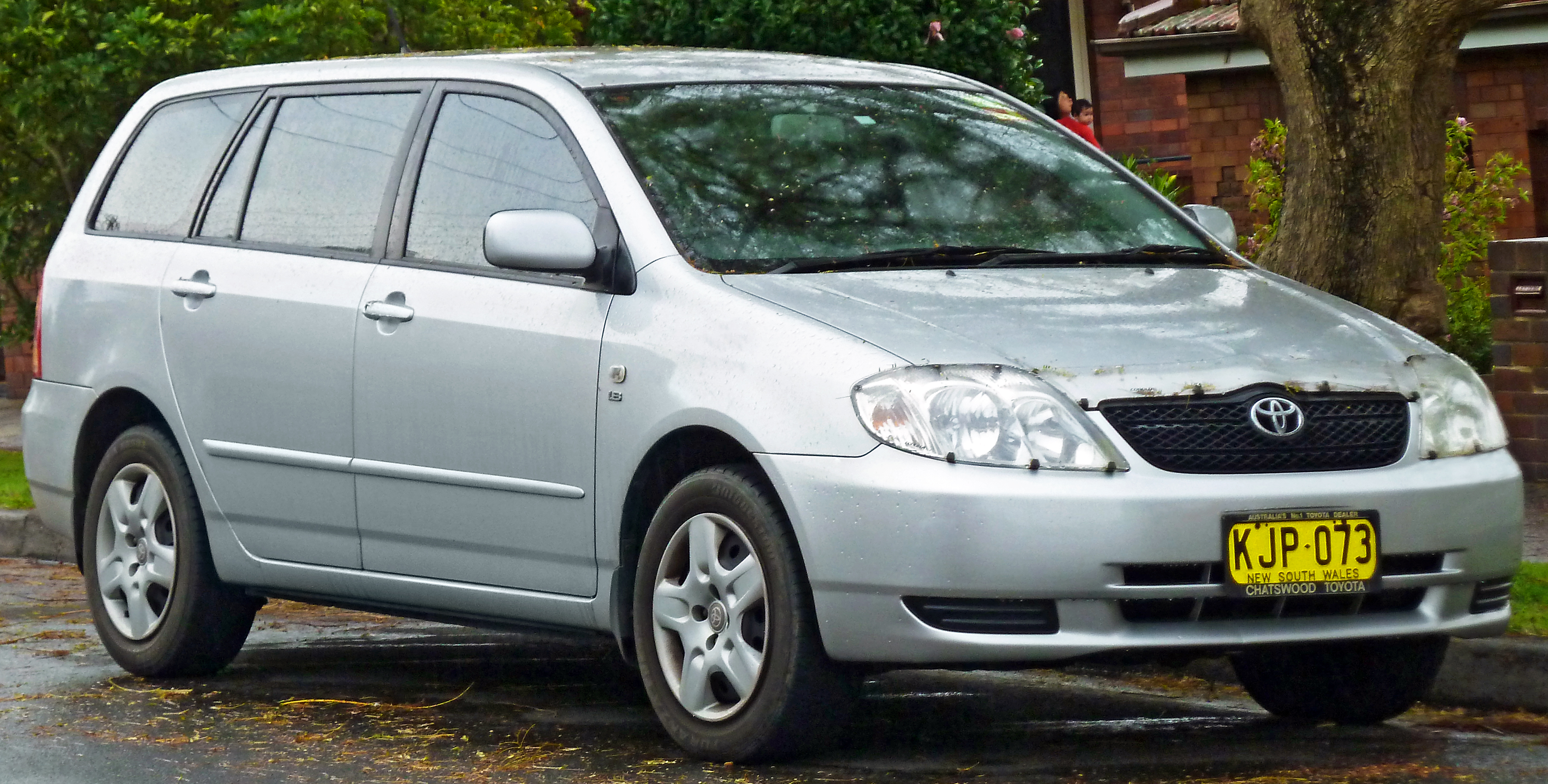
Ninth-generation wagon

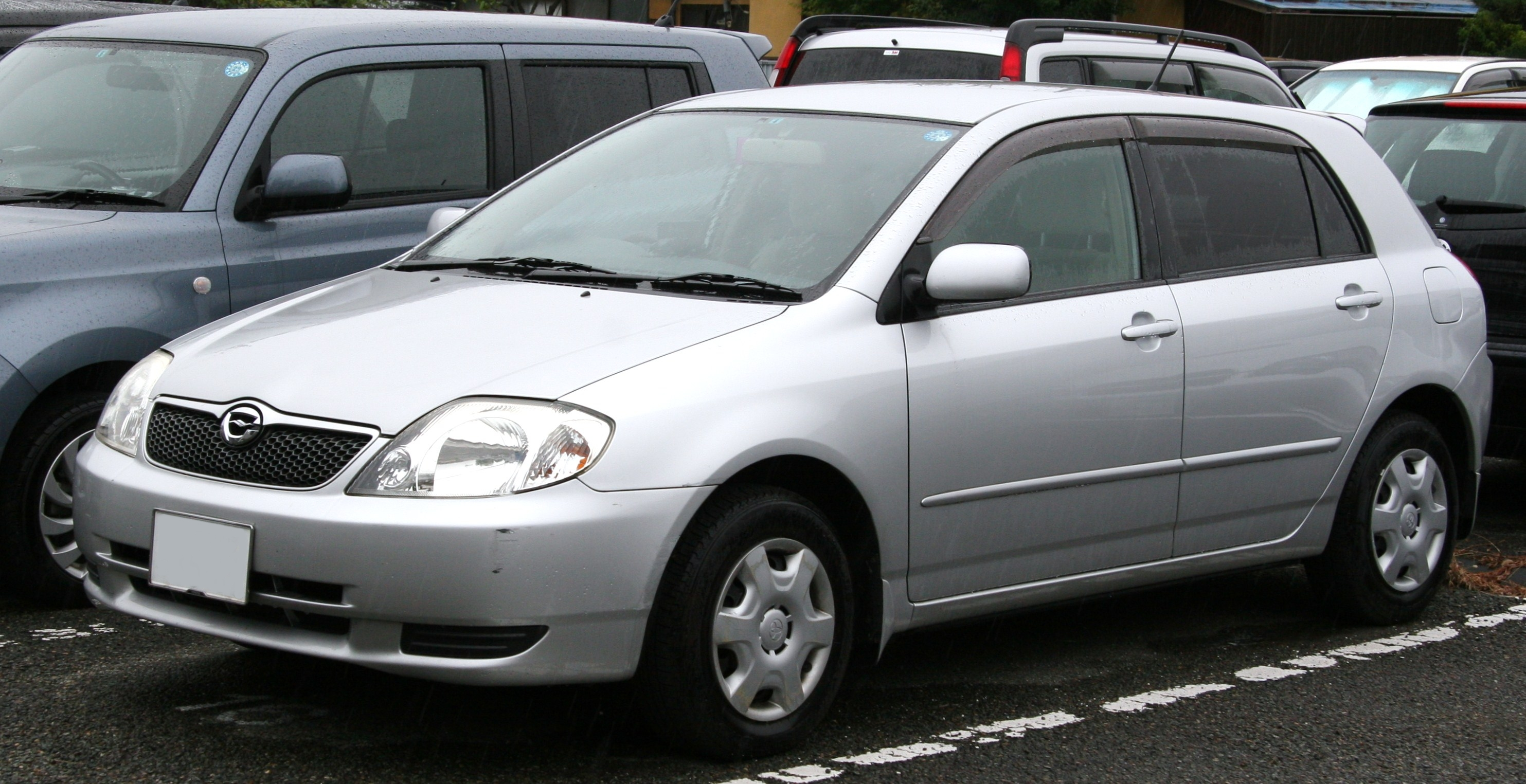
Ninth-generation hatchback

For the ninth generation, Toyota split the Corolla into two separate models. The E120 was designed for the Japanese, European, Australasian, and the Middle Eastern markets, while the wider E130 Corolla was designed for other Asian and American markets.

=== Japan, Europe, Australasia, and others (E120) ===
In August 2000, the E120 ninth-generation Corolla was introduced in Japan, with edgier styling and more technology to bring the nameplate into the 21st century. This version was sold in Japan, Australasia, Europe and the Middle East.

The station wagon model is called the Corolla Fielder in Japan. Production in Japan ended in January 2007 (for Corolla Runx and Allex),

=== Asia and Americas (E130) ===
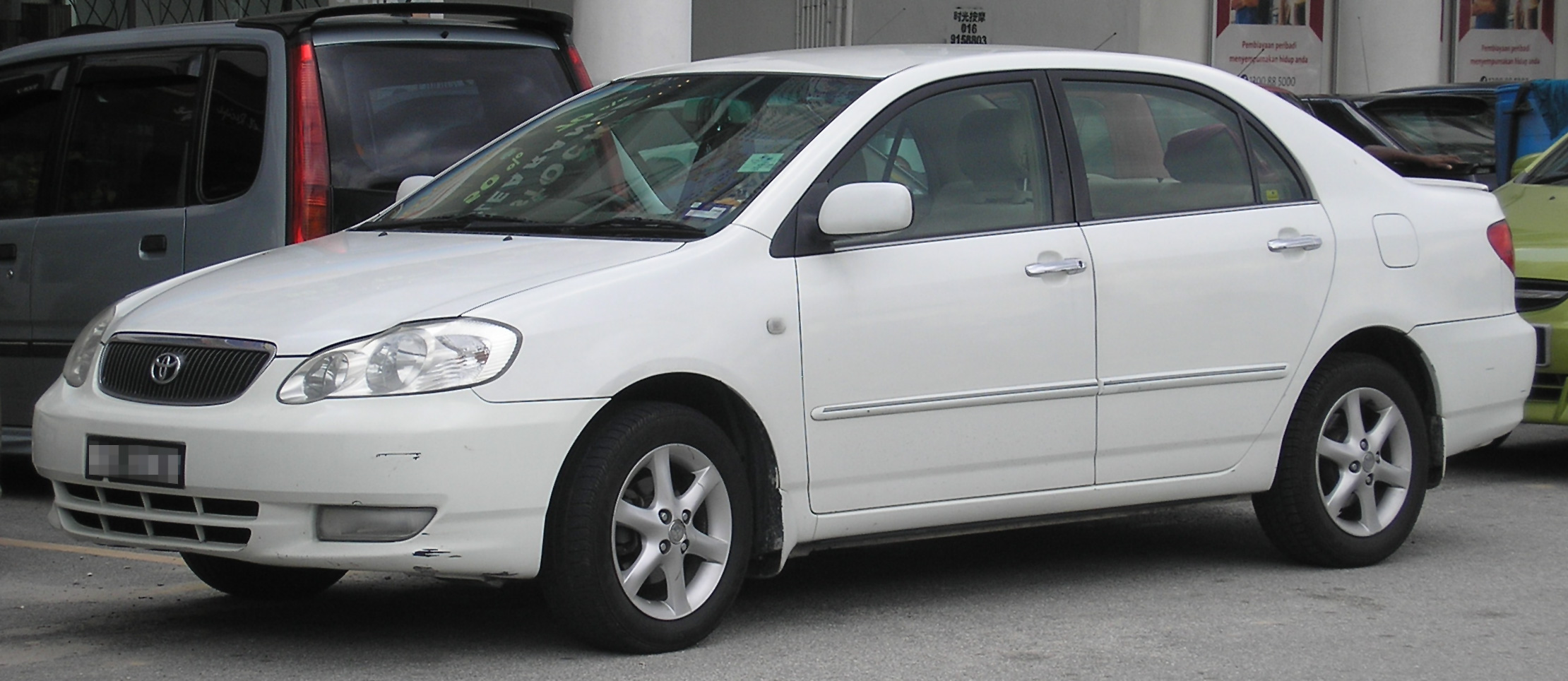
Ninth generation sedan

In mid-2001, the E120 Corolla Altis was released. It had a refreshed look and was slightly longer and wider than the E120 for other markets, but with similar body panels and interior. The Altis was sold in Southeast Asia, India, and Taiwan. India received a de-tuned version of the 1ZZ-FE and was comparatively slower than its rivals.

The North American release was delayed until March 2002 (for the 2003 model year). The E130 was sold in North America from 2003, It had similar look to the Corolla Altis sold in Southeast Asia. The E120 continued in parallel in separate markets to the E130. Production in North America continued until October 2007 for the 2007 model year.

The E130 wagon was sold exclusive in South America has an E130 front bumper and an E120 rear bumper.

Production continued in China as the Corolla EX until February 2017.

== Tenth generation (E140, E150; 2006) ==
=== Japan (E140 narrow) ===
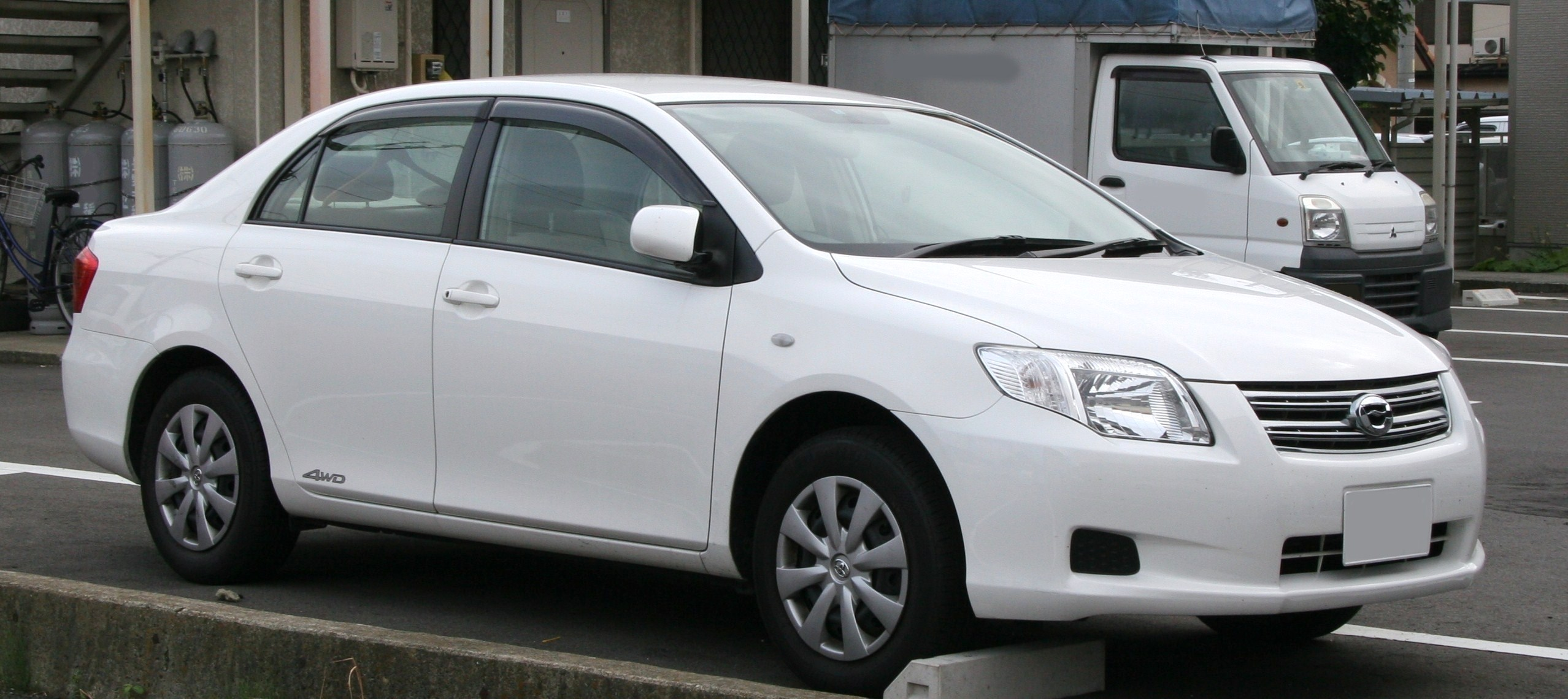

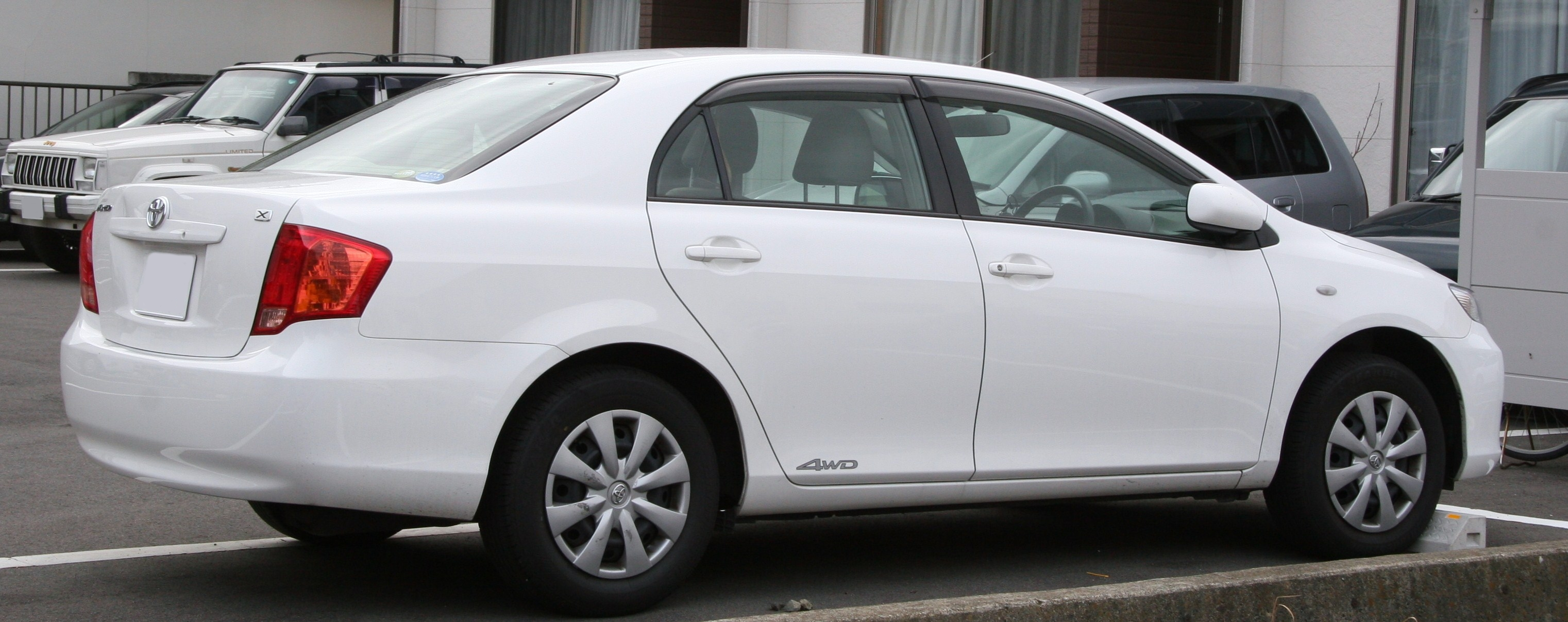
Tenth-generation sedan (Japan; pre-facelift)

The tenth generation of the E140 Corolla was introduced in October 2006. Japanese markets called the sedan Corolla Axio. The station wagon retained the Corolla Fielder name.

=== International (E140/E150 wide) ===
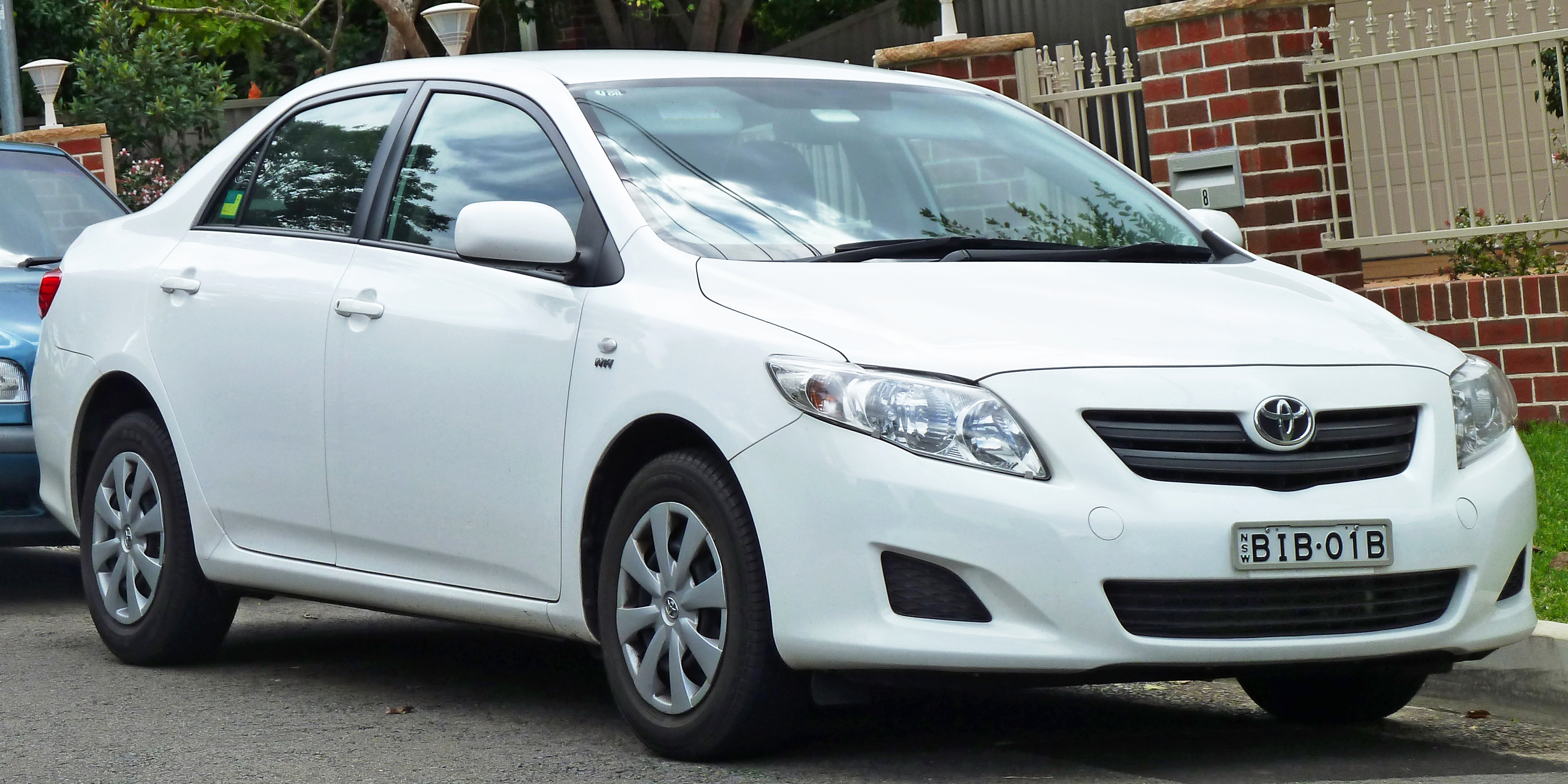
Tenth-generation sedan (International), front

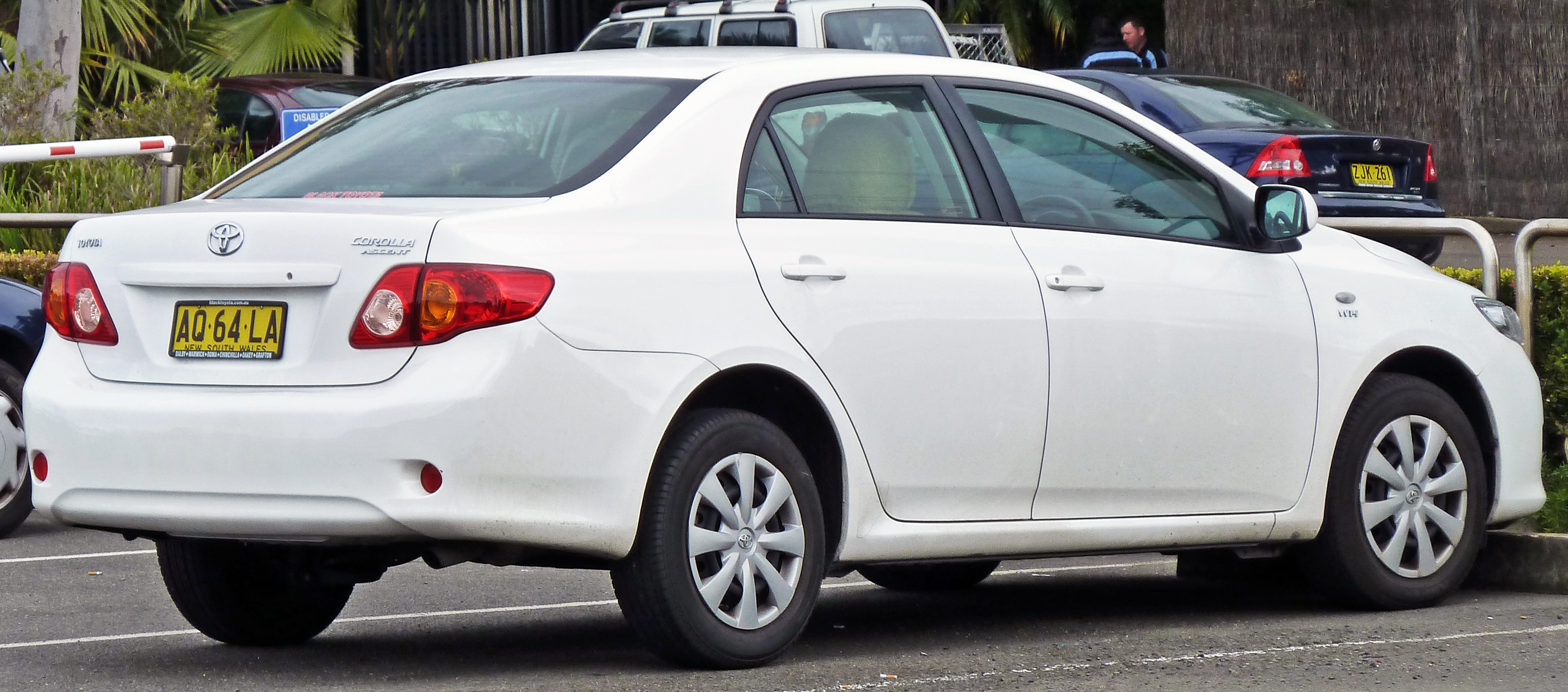
Tenth-generation sedan (International), rear

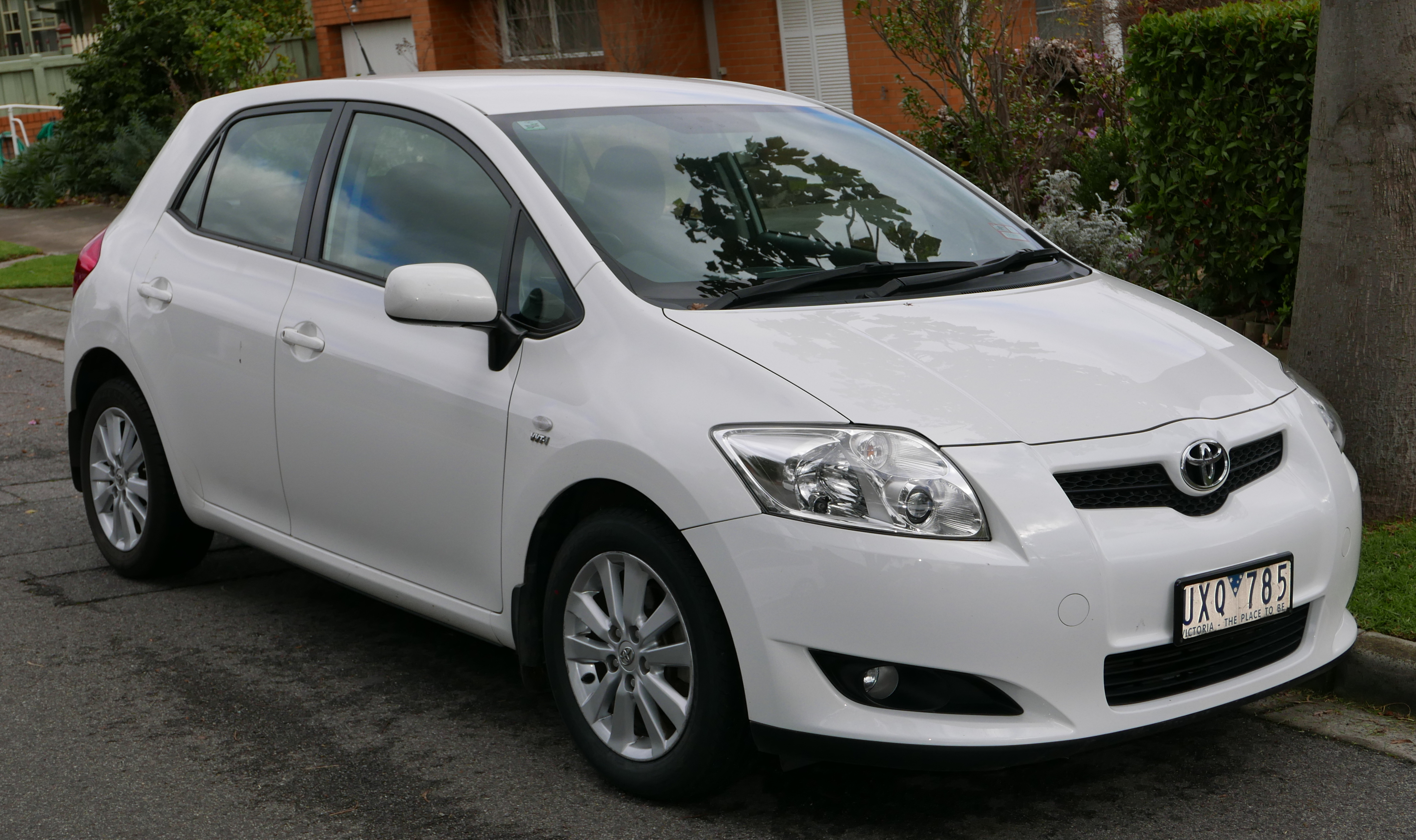
Tenth-generation hatchback (Australasia only)

For international markets, a wider version of the E140 was sold with different styling, with the Southeast Asian, Pakistani, Indian and Taiwanese markets retaining the Corolla Altis branding. Production continued from June 2014 until 2020 in South Africa as the entry-level Corolla Quest.

In Australasia, the related first-generation Toyota Auris was also sold as the Corolla hatchback alongside the sedan body shape of the International E140 Corolla.

== Eleventh generation (E160, E170, E180; 2012) ==
For the eleventh generation, Toyota split the Corolla into three separate models. The E160 was designed for the Japanese, Hong Kong, Macau, and New Zealand markets, while the E170/E180 Corolla was designed for most international markets.

=== Japan (E160; 2012) ===
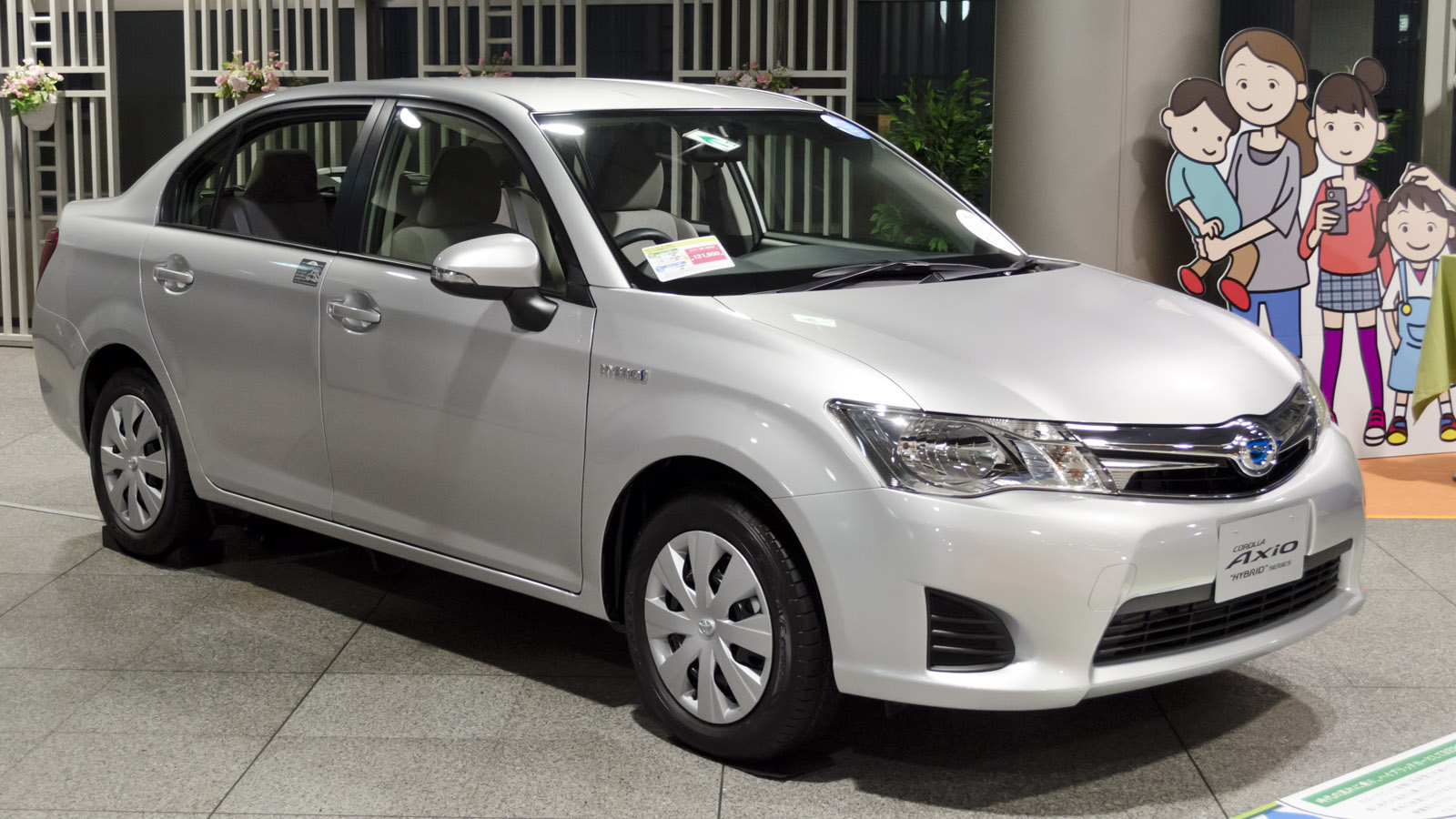
Eleventh-generation sedan (Japan, pre-facelift)

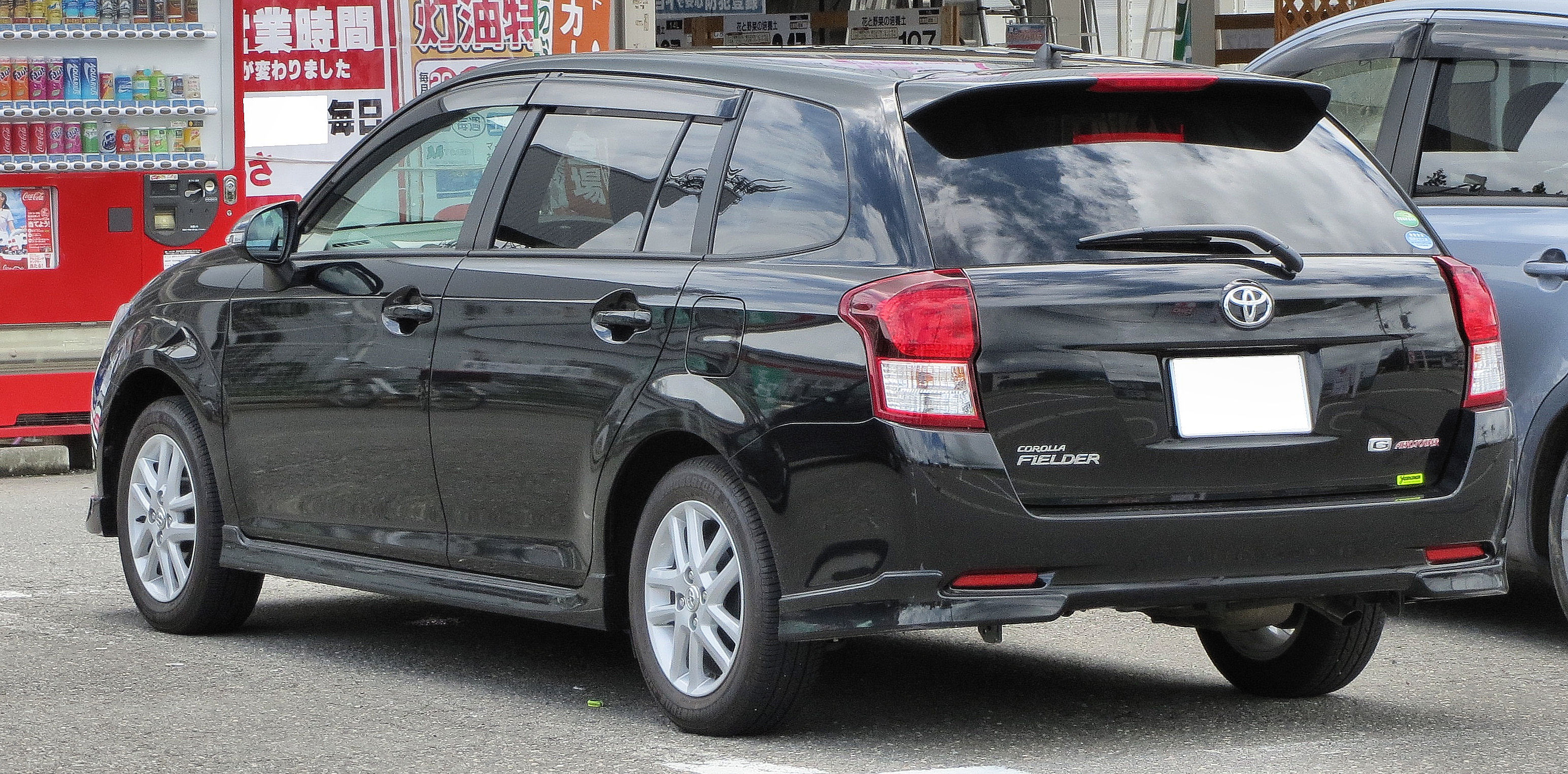
Eleventh-generation wagon (Japan, pre-facelift)

The eleventh generation of the Corolla went on sale in Japan in May 2012. The sedan is named the Corolla Axio while the wagon is called the Corolla Fielder. In Japan, both are made by a Toyota subsidiary, Central Motors, in Miyagi Prefecture, Japan. The redesigned model has slightly smaller exterior dimensions and is easier to drive in narrow alleys and parking lots for the targeted elderly drivers.

The new Corolla Axio is available with either a 1.3-liter 1NR-FE or 1.5-liter 1NZ-FE four-cylinder engines; front- or all-wheel drive. Both 5-speed manual and CVT transmissions are offered. The 1.3-liter engine and all-wheel-drive variants are available only with the CVT transmission. The Corolla Fielder is available with 1.5-liter 1NZ-FE or 1.8-liter 2ZR-FAE four cylinder engines mated with a CVT transmission. The 1.5-liter is available with front- and all-wheel drive, the 1.8-liter is offered only in front-wheel drive. Since 2015 there's a new engine 2NR-FKE, with its VVT-ie technology.

Toyota released hybrid versions of the Corolla Axio sedan and Corolla Fielder station wagon for the Japanese market in August 2013. Both cars are equipped with a 1.5-liter hybrid system similar to the one used in the Toyota Prius C, with a fuel efficiency of 3.03 L/100 km (93.2 mpg_{‑imp}; 77.6 mpg_{‑US}) under the JC08 test cycle. Toyota's monthly sales target for Japan was 1,000 units of the Corolla Axio hybrid and 1,500 units of the Corolla Fielder hybrid.

The Mitsuoka Ryugi for the Japanese market were based on the E160 Corolla. The front fascia harkens back to the Rolls-Royce Silver Cloud. The engine options are the same as the Corolla Axio and the Fielder. The Mitsuoka Ryugi was discontinued in 2026.

Production of the Corolla Axio and Fielder continued for business users until discontinued in October 2025, for private-use replaced by larger E210 in September 2019.

=== International (E170/E180; 2013) ===
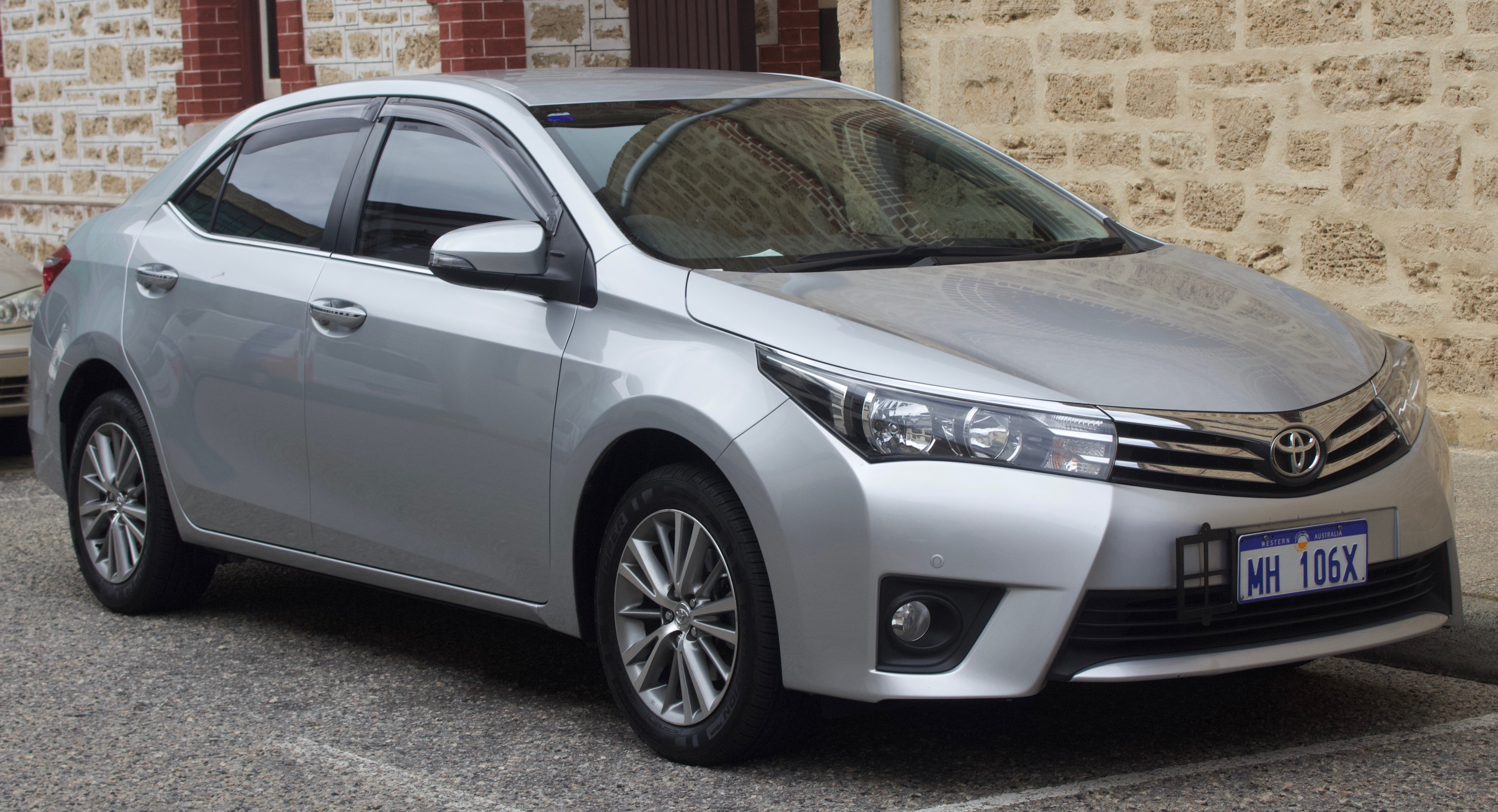
Eleventh-generation sedan (International)

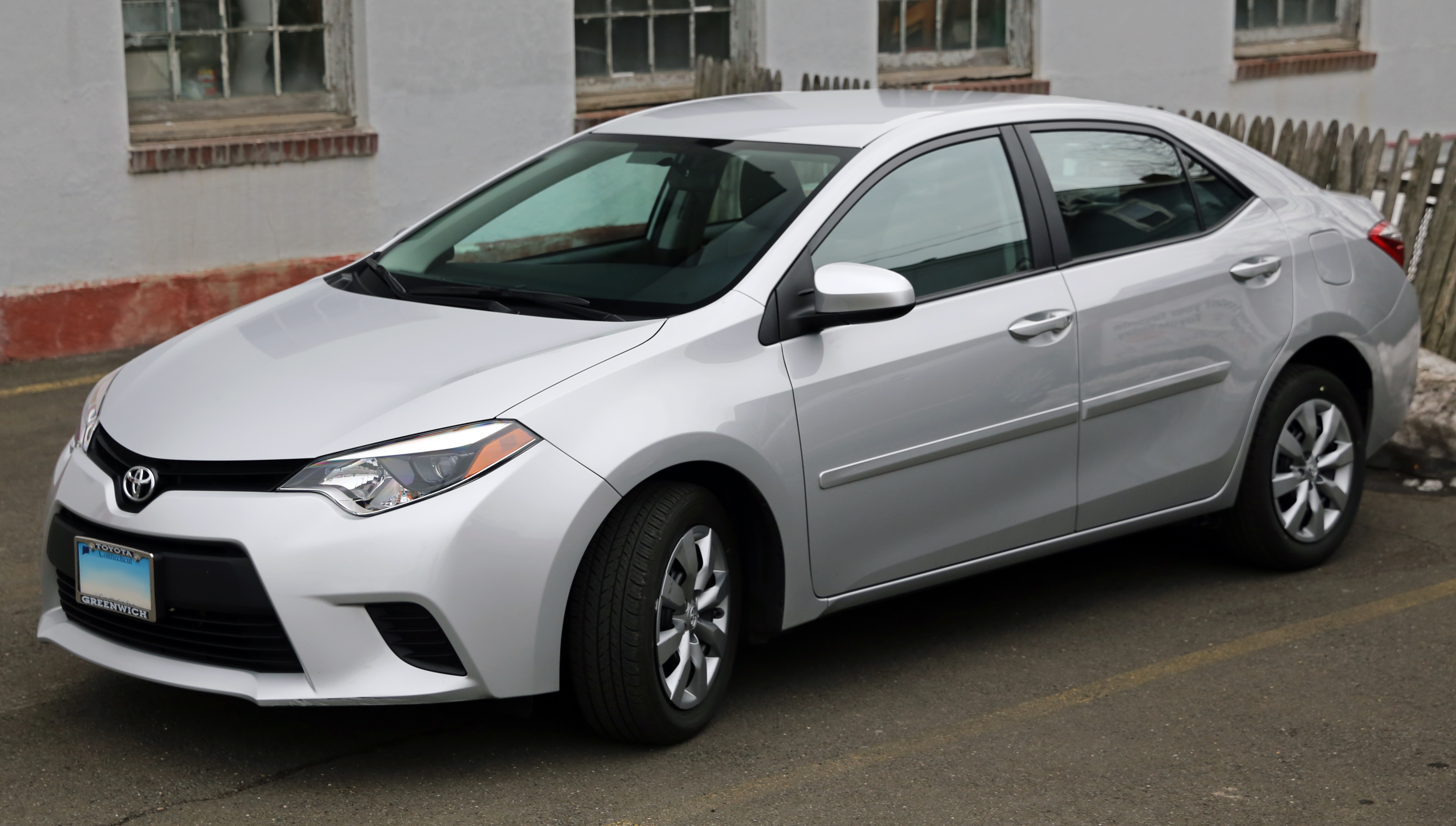
Eleventh-generation sedan (North America)

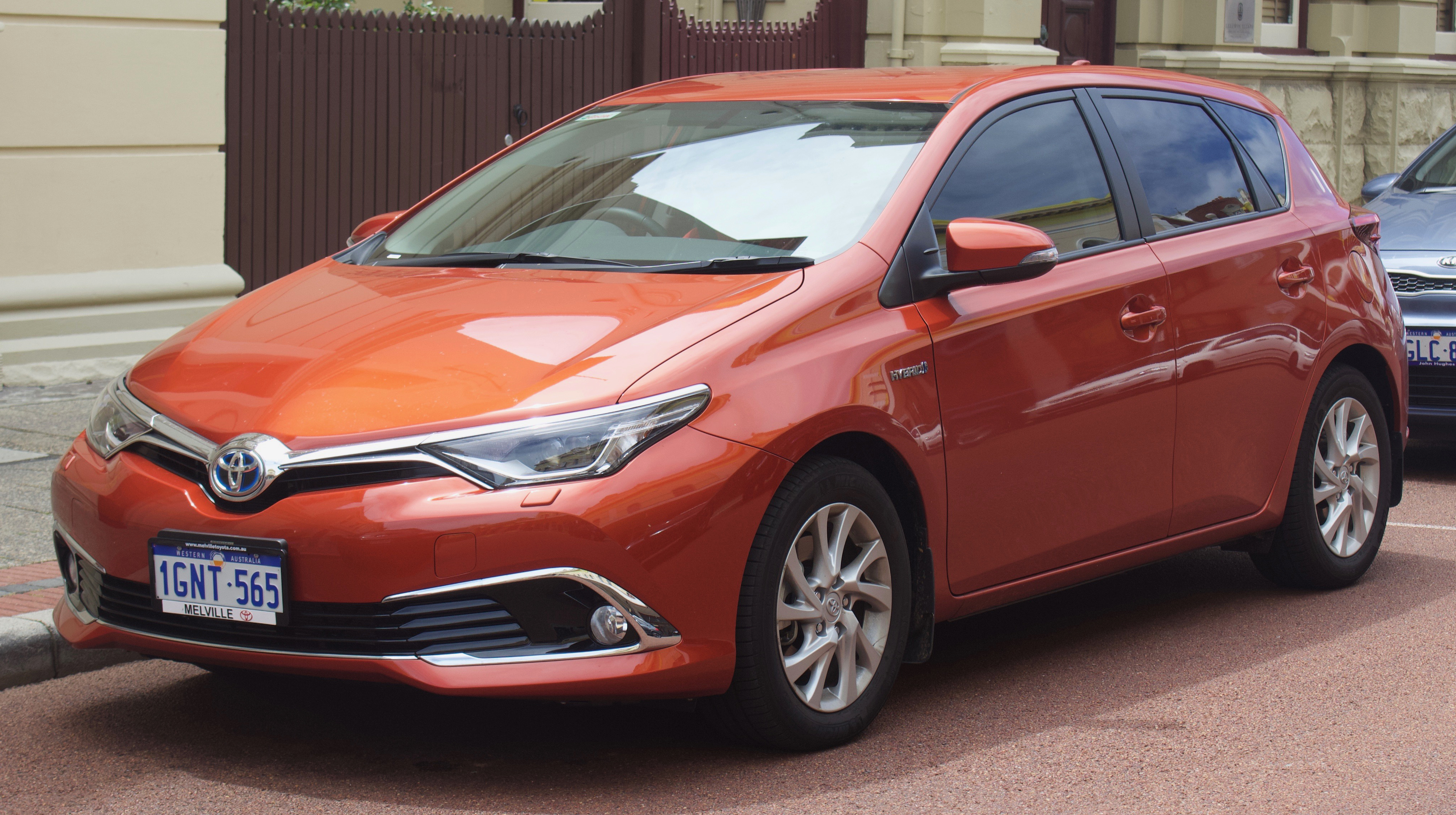
Eleventh-generation hatchback (second-generation Auris)

International markets continued on with the E140/E150 until at least 2013 when the E170/E180 model was unveiled in 8 July 2013.

The E170/E180 is larger and substantially different from the Japanese E160, with a unique body and interior. Two basic front and rear styling treatments are fitted to the E170: a North American version that debuted first and a more conservative design for other markets that debuted later in August 2013. The latter version sold in Southeast Asian, Pakistani, Indian and Taiwanese markets retained the Corolla Altis branding went to sale in early 2014. The Corolla E180 went on sale in Europe and South Africa in February 2014.

In Australasia, the European market second-generation Toyota Auris was also sold badged as the Corolla hatchback, alongside the international E170 Corolla.

In 2015, for the 2016 model year, Toyota’s North American Sub-brand, Scion, introduced the Scion iM, based on the second generation Toyota Auris. In 2016, for the 2017 model year, the iM was rebranded as the Toyota Corolla iM when the Scion brand was discontinued.

== Twelfth generation (E210; 2018) ==
The twelfth generation of the Corolla, built on the TNGA-C platform, is available in three body styles:

=== Hatchback ===
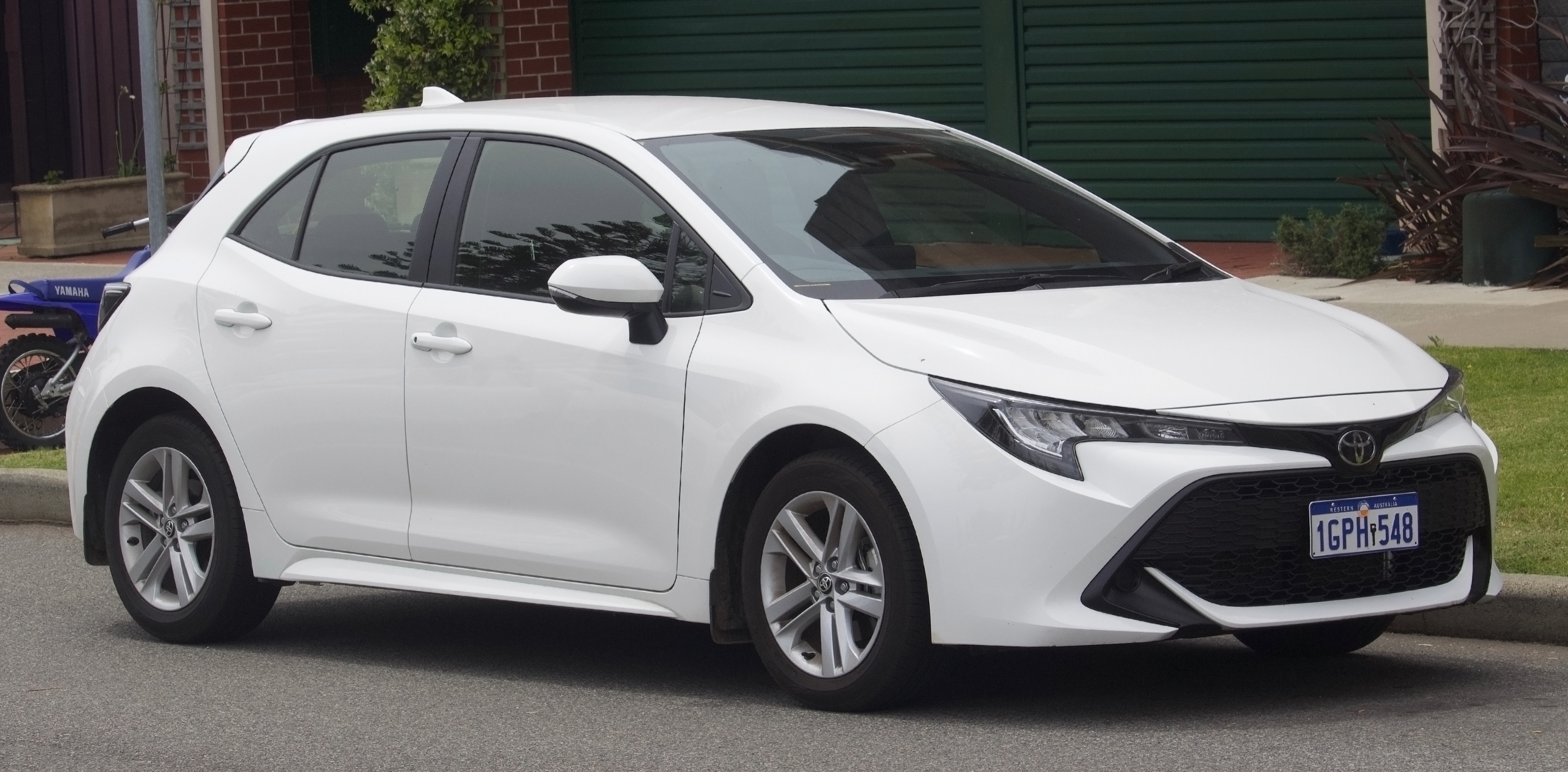

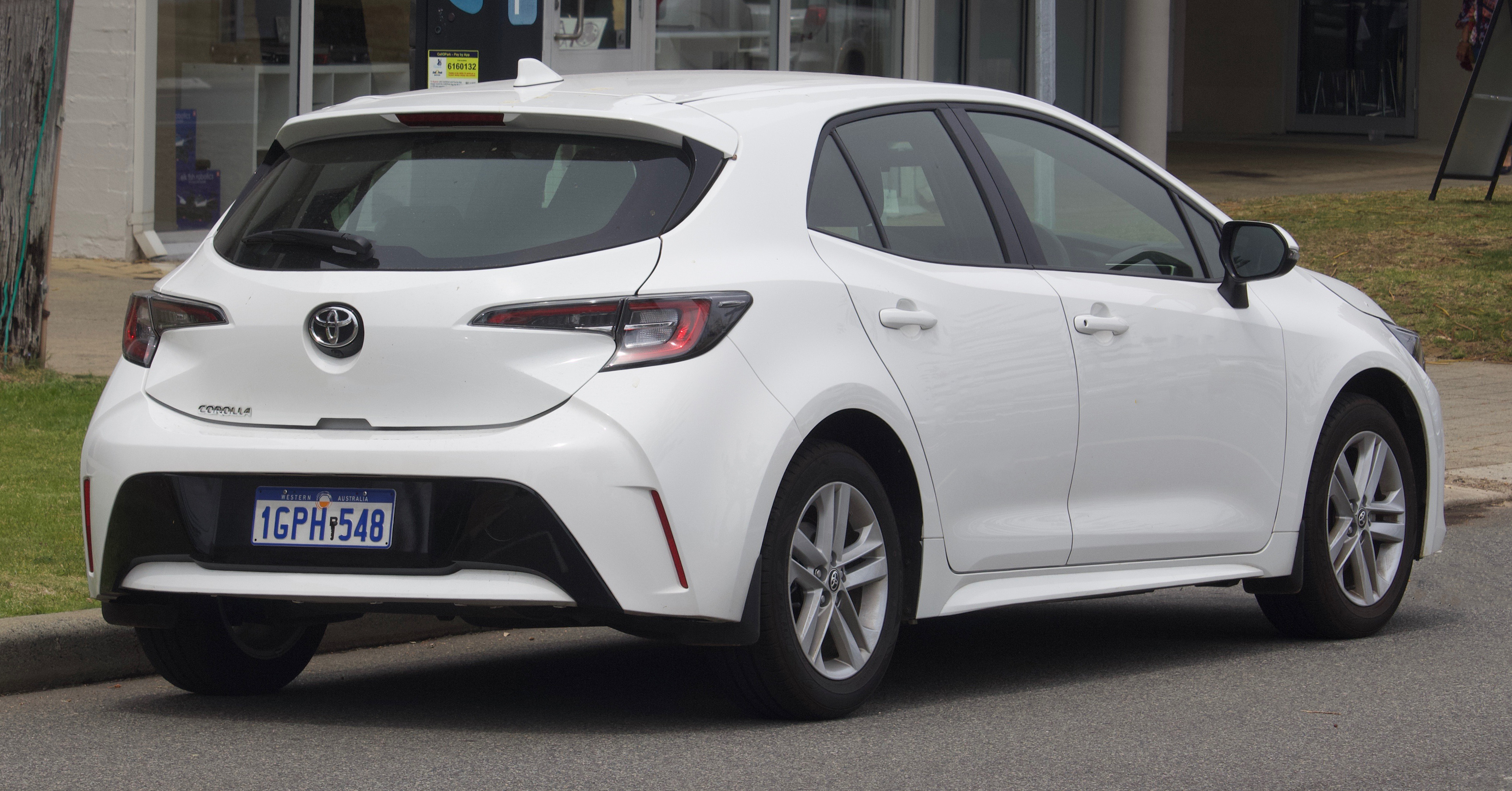
Twelfth-generation hatchback

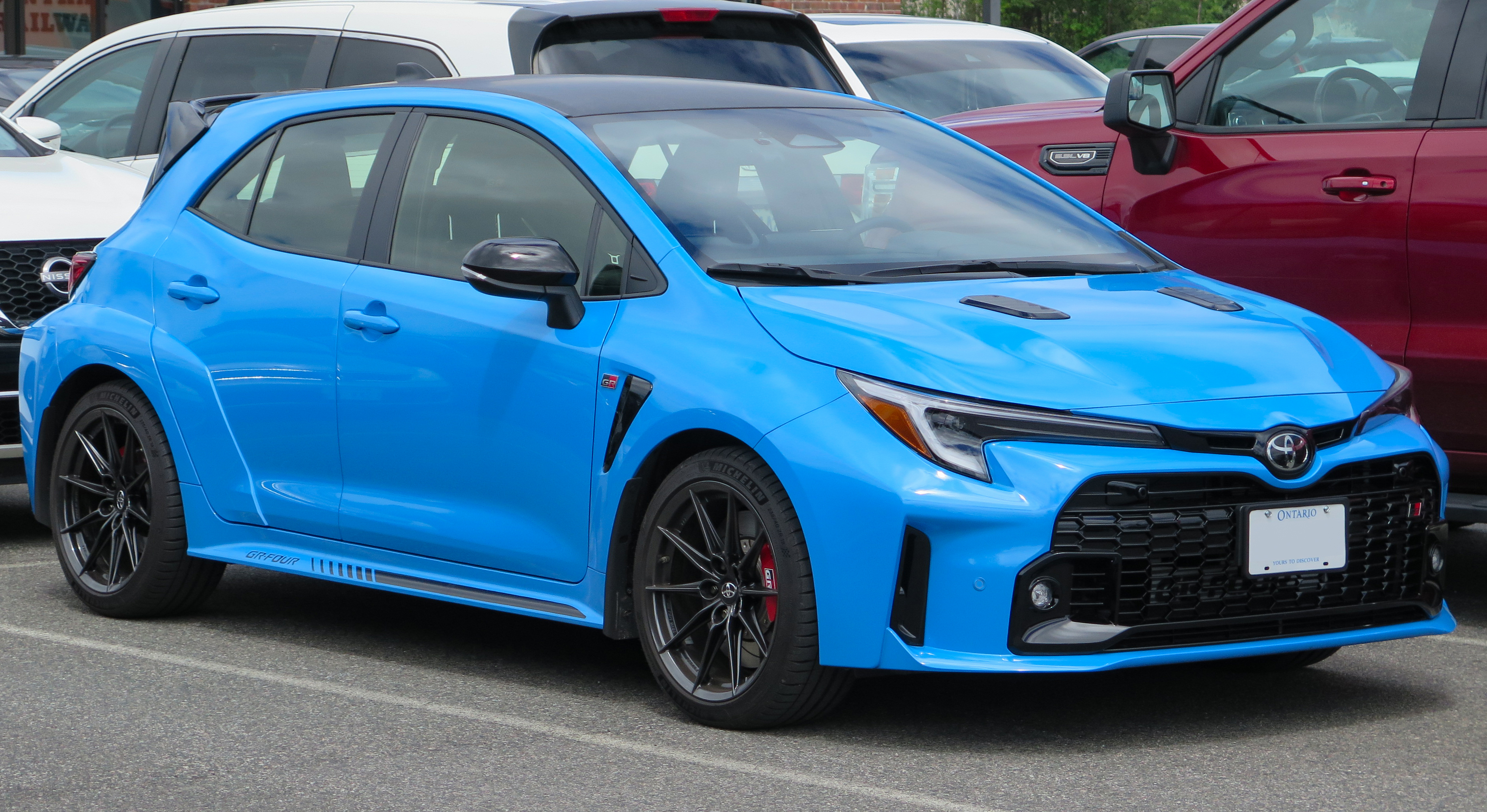
Toyota GR Corolla

The twelfth generation Corolla in hatchback body style was unveiled as a pre-production model in early March 2018 at the Geneva Motor Show as the Auris. The production version of the Corolla Hatchback for the North American market was unveiled on 28 March 2018 at the New York International Auto Show, with the official details and photos revealed on 22 March 2018. The Corolla Hatchback was launched in Japan on 26 June 2018 as the Corolla Sport. The Corolla Hatchback went on sale in the United States in mid-July 2018, and was later launched in Australia on 7 August 2018. Production of the European market Corolla Hatchback began on 14 January 2019, and sales began in the UK in February 2019 and across Europe in March 2019.

A high-performance variant of the Corolla hatchback, called the GR Corolla, debuted in March 2022.

=== Estate ===
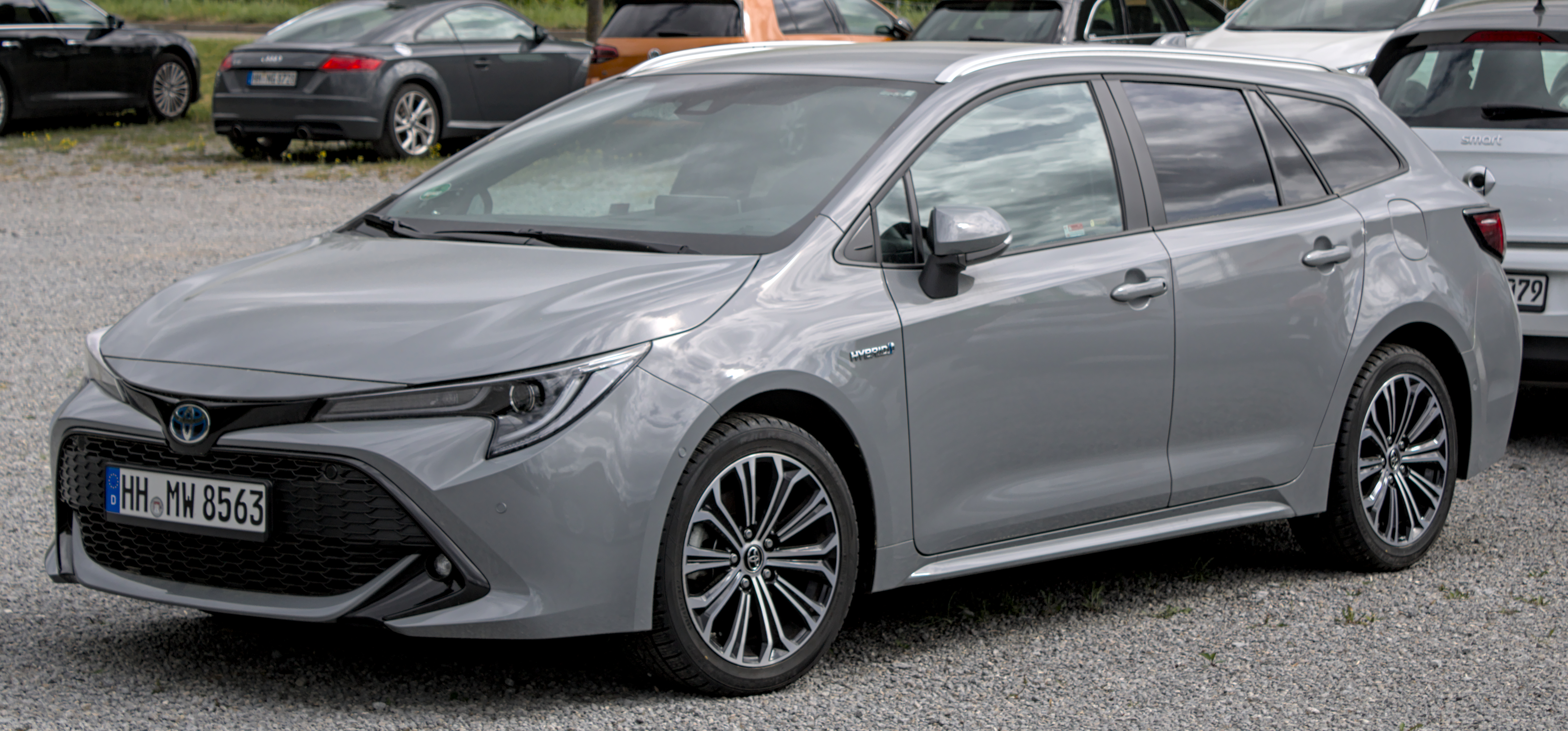

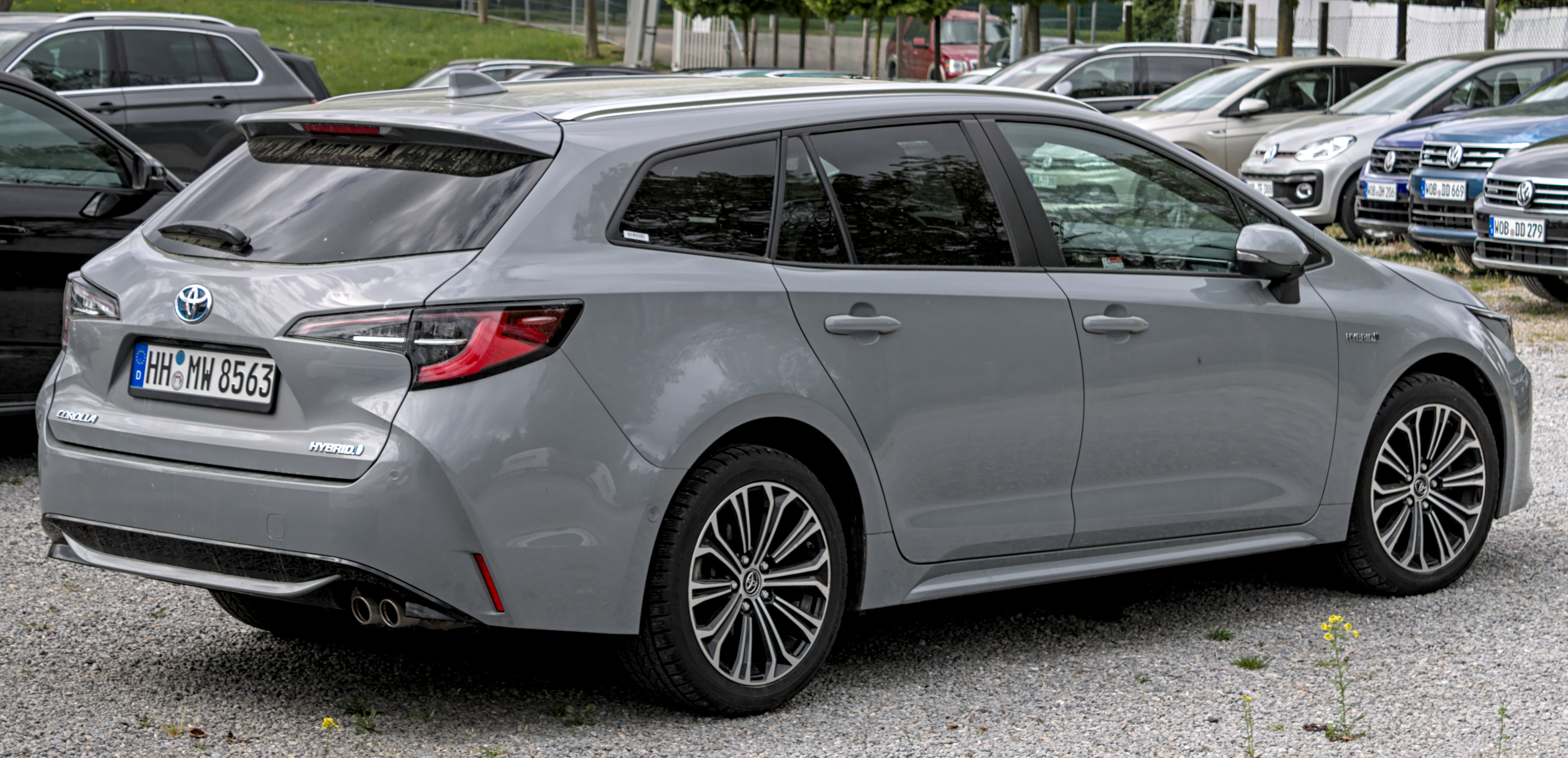
Twelfth-generation estate

The estate variation of the twelfth generation Corolla, called the Corolla Touring Sports (simply called Corolla Touring in Japan), was unveiled at the 2018 Paris Motor Show. The official images of the Corolla Touring Sports were revealed on 4 September 2018.

The Corolla Touring Sports is also sold by Suzuki as the Swace in Europe from 2020 until discontinued in 2025 in certain European-markets.

=== Sedan ===
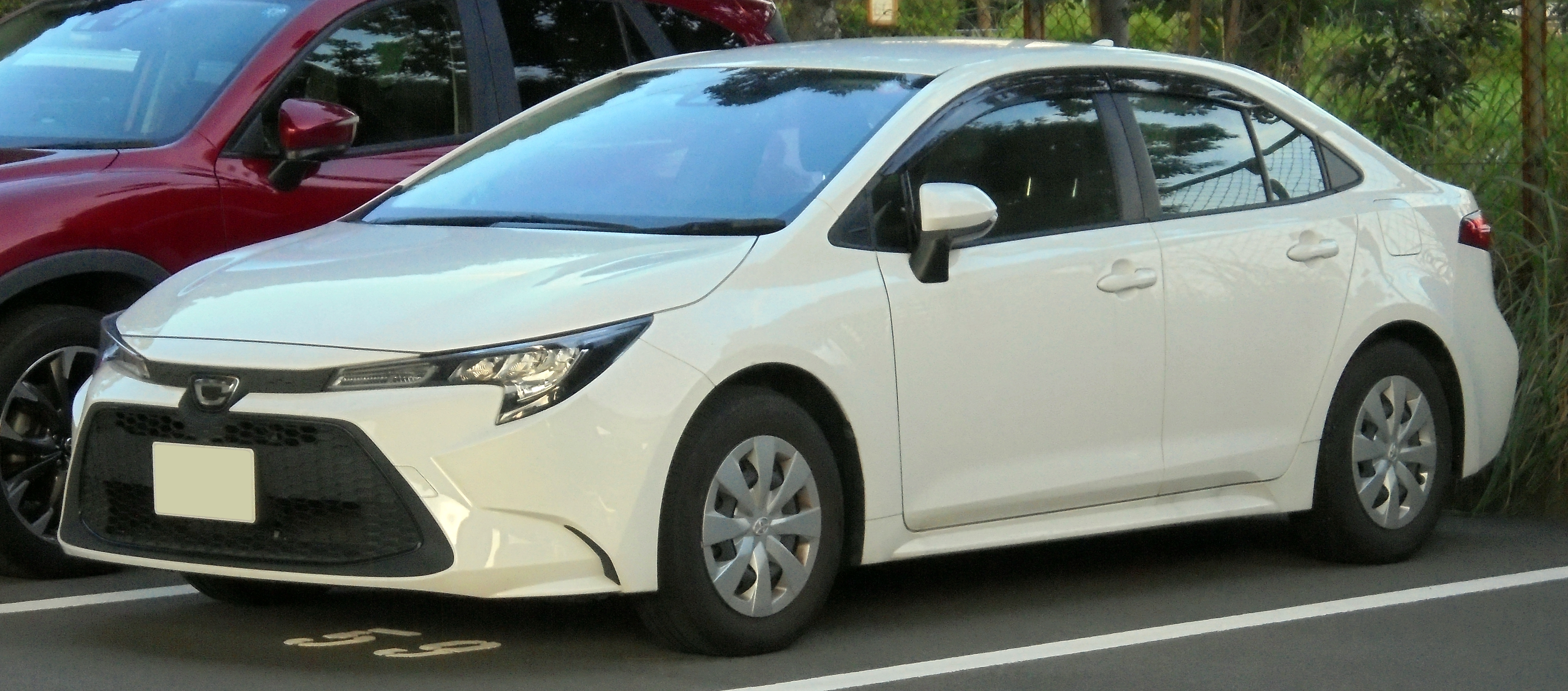

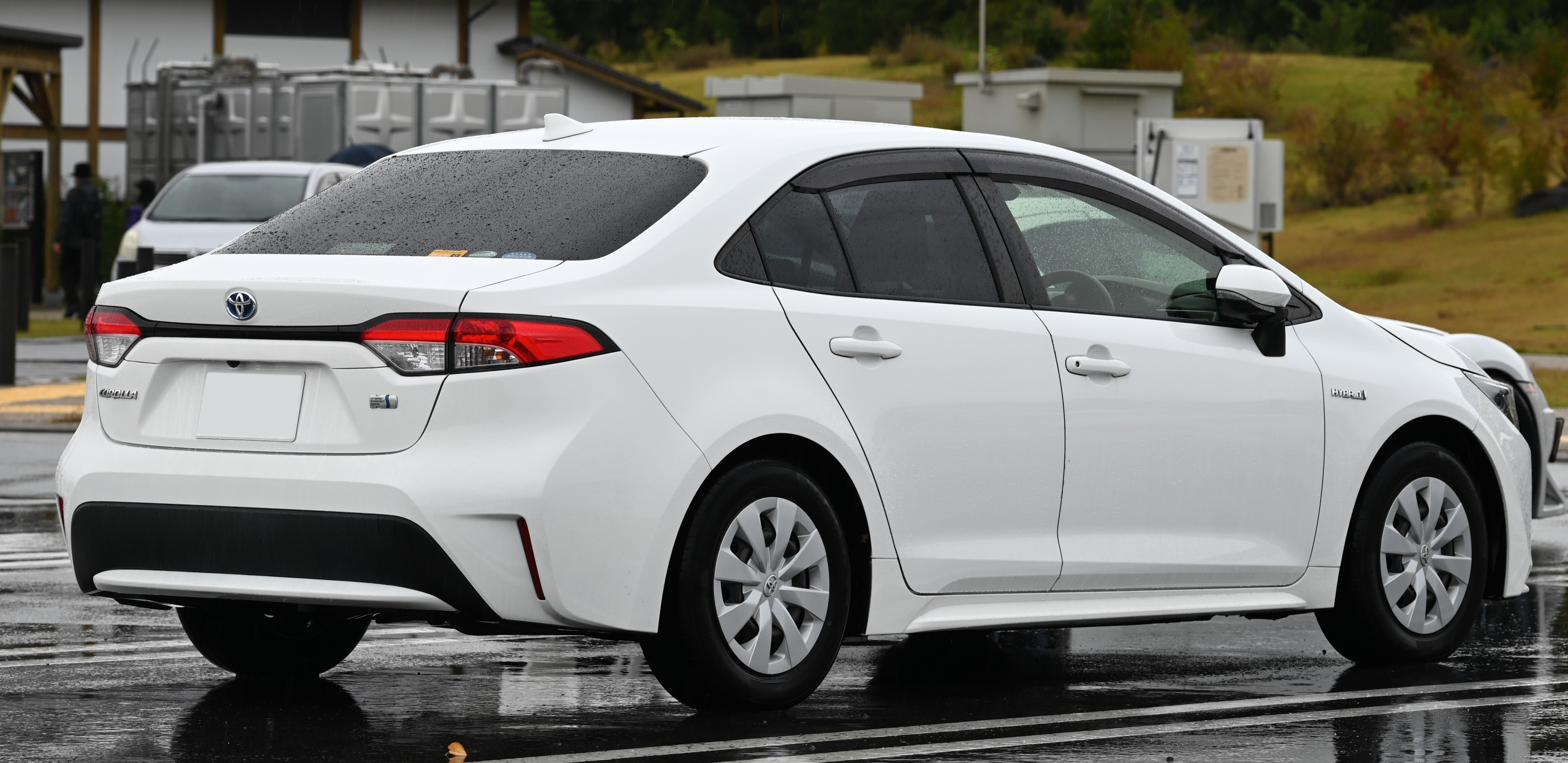
Twelfth-generation sedan (Sporty)

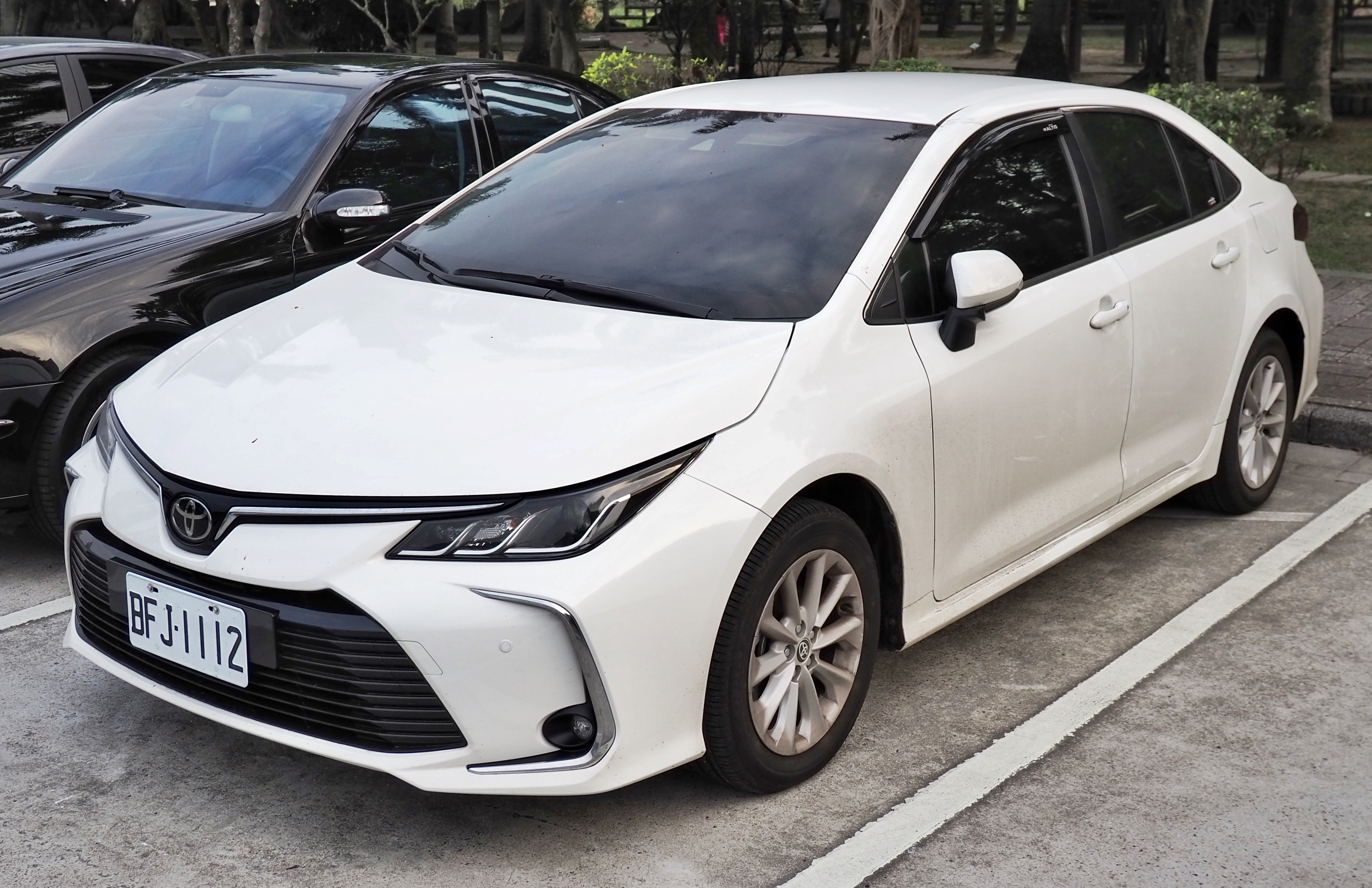
Twelfth-generation sedan (Prestige)

The sedan variation of the Corolla was unveiled simultaneously between 15 and 16 November 2018 in Carmel-by-the-Sea, California, United States, and in China at the 2018 Guangzhou International Motor Show. The model is sold in two versions: Prestige (sold in China, Europe, Southeast Asia, and other countries) and Sporty (sold in North America, Japan, Australia and other countries), and sold in China as the Levin.

The Prestige model uses a different front fascia, which is more similar to the XV70 Camry. This model is sold as the Corolla Altis in Taiwan and Southeast Asia. The Sporty model uses a similar front fascia to the hatchback and wagon versions. A long-wheelbase version of the Prestige model with a slightly altered front fascia is sold as the Allion in China, while the long-wheelbase Sporty version is called the Levin GT and from 2026 model year, the Levin L.

== Sales ==
Global sales of the Toyota Corolla
Calendar year	Japan	U.S.	Canada	Mexico	Australia	Europe	Thailand	Pakistan	India	China			Argentina	Brazil	Indonesia	
Calendar year	Japan	U.S.	Canada	Mexico	Australia	Europe	Thailand	Pakistan	India	Corolla EX	Corolla	Levin	Argentina	Brazil	Gasoline	Hybrid
1973		116,905														
1974		103,394														
1975		151,177														
1976		187,321														
1977		259,344														
1978		212,757														
1979		257,096														
1980		257,315														
1983		178,572														
1984																
1985		168,378														
1986		159,458														
1987		164,300														
1988		216,677			23,586											
1989		199,975			22,130											
1990	300,008	228,211			29,981										5,704	
1991	275,019	199,083			26,227										4,118	
1992	260,777	196,118			23,825										5,153	
1993	237,537	193,749			23,777										4,943	
1994	228,660	210,926			21,915										7,022	
1995	235,626	213,640			23,372										6,941	
1996	223,244	209,048			23,212										5,769	
1997	238,098	218,461			22,319										4,910	
1998	196,498	250,501			25,079										803	
1999	160,677	249,128			28,387			8,268							1,258	
2000	162,870	230,156			30,576			8,778							2,928	
2001	236,507	245,023			30,813			8,116						12,092	3,865	
2002	226,222	254,360		1,888	34,948			6,151						17,084	3,368	
2003	198,904	325,477		3,248	36,128			12,867	8,175					35,655	2,544	
2004	173,301	333,161		4,057	39,053			20,321	10,195	45,476				42,143	2,607	
2005	149,810	341,290		6,440	46,415			23,002	8,974	67,392				43,795	1,909	
2006	143,176	387,388		7,963	46,256			30,527	7,168	78,973				44,401	1,062	
2007	147,069	371,390		10,284	47,792	85,407		35,762	6,463	63,999	65,844			42,972	933	
2008	144,051	351,007	57,736	9,370	47,901	119,120		33,640	8,102	52,247	165,271			48,360	2,884	
2009	90,178	296,874	53,933	7,580	39,013			26,760	8,604	57,109	157,457			54,620	1,203	
2010	111,265	266,082	38,680	9,085	41,632	51,189		43,510	10,041	82,743	172,053			54,987	1,635	
2011	70,758	240,259	36,663	10,306	36,087	69,889		41,111	9,283	120,962	170,467			53,156	1,697	
2012	80,459	290,947	40,906	12,767	38,799	63,481		46,207	6,912	124,531	151,887			56,369	1,888	
2013	101,664	302,180	44,449	10,956	43,498	67,987		32,608	4,106	147,921	146,480			54,106	1,340	
2014	114,331	339,498	48,881	13,553	43,735		36,595	29,087	6,748	85,835	171,487	49,112		63,299	1,874	
2015	109,027	363,332	47,199	13,215	42,073	69,194	20,966	51,398	7,574	46,340	254,301	125,699	15,829	66,934	1,232	
2016	84,770	378,210	45,626	13,228	40,330	67,876	18,052	57,452	4,860	17,091	307,360	159,071	15,786	64,744	961	
2017	77,466	329,196	50,332	10,135	37,353	60,936	19,179	52,676	4,242	2,829	336,763	172,626	17,230	66,198	706	
2018	89,910	303,732	48,796	6,351	35,230	55,686	21,914	51,412	3,286		374,400	192,697	15,582	59,065	588	
2019	104,406	304,850	47,596	11,594	30,468	133,597		56,720	1,422		357,798	213,905	9,045	56,712	409	38
2020	118,276	237,178	37,156	8,127	25,882	137,209		22,140			350,310	222,361	4,336	41,083	620	41
2021	110,865	248,993	40,020	8,770	28,768	146,604		18,355			321,912	220,549		41,902	454	94
2022	131,548	222,216	33,096	8,962	25,284	182,278	6,655							42,852	850	196
2023	154,870	232,370	29,260	11,526	19,986	181,094					183,199	114,055		42,989	384	128
2024	166,956	232,908		11,788	24,027	163,393	4,398				114,216	68,943		37,659	166	41
2025	138,829	248,088		10,054	18,968	155,643					93,240	30,513	9,277	33,218	53	87

== Alternative versions ==
In Japan, the Corolla has always been exclusive to the Japanese retail sales chain called Toyota Corolla Store, which was previously established in 1961, known as Toyota Publica Store, selling the Publica.

A rebadged version called the Sprinter (initially as Corolla Sprinter) introduced in 1968; almost two years after the introduction of the Corolla in Japan and sold through a different Toyota Japan dealership sales channel known since 1966 as the Toyota Auto dealership. The liftback and coupe versions are called Corolla Levin

There have been several models over the years, including the Corolla Ceres (and similar Sprinter Marino) hardtop, Corolla Levin and Sprinter Trueno sports coupés and hatchbacks, and the Corolla FX hatchback, which became the Corolla RunX, while the Sprinter became the Allex, with the introduction of the E120 series Corolla. The RunX and Allex was replaced by the Auris in 2006 (known only as Corolla in markets outside Japan, Europe and South Africa). A luxury version of the Auris installed with V6 engines was briefly sold at Japanese Toyota dealerships Toyota Store and Toyopet Store locations as the Blade, which was sold until 2012.

A compact MPV named the Corolla Verso has also been released in European markets. Its Japanese counterpart is the Corolla Spacio, which has been discontinued as of the tenth generation. The Corolla Rumion is also sold in the US market as the Scion xB.

The Corolla Matrix, better known just as the Matrix, shares the E120 and E140 platforms, and is considered the hatchback/sport wagon counterpart of the North American Corolla sedan, as the European/Australasian Corolla hatchback is not sold there. Toyota frequently combines the sales figures of the Corolla sedan and Matrix.

The Pontiac Vibe, which is the General Motors badged version of the Matrix, shares the Corolla platform. The Vibe was exported from Fremont, California, to the Japanese market where it was sold as the Toyota Voltz.

The Corolla Cross is the crossover SUV-counterpart of the E210 series Corolla. The Corolla Deck is a pickup truck based on the Corolla Cross and is expected to be marketed in Latin American market in 2027.

Over many years, there have been rebadged versions of the Corolla, sold by General Motors, including the Holden Nova in Australia during the early 1990s, and the Sprinter-based Chevrolet Nova, Chevrolet Prizm, and Geo Prizm (in the United States as part of the GM S platform). The Corolla liftback (TE72) of Toyota Australia was badged as simply the T-18. The five-door liftback was sold with the Corolla Seca name in Australia and the nameplate survived on successive five-door models.

The Daihatsu Charmant was heavily inspired by the E20 to E70 Corolla Platforms.

The Tercel was a front wheel drive car, first introduced in 1980 at Japanese Toyota dealerships called Toyota Corolla Store, and was called the Corolla Tercel then, and later given its own name in 1984. Between 1982 and 1999, the hatchback version of the Toyota Tercel in Japan is called Corolla II also used from Tercel platform.

== See also ==
- Toyota Sprinter, the Corolla's twin for Japanese market with slightly different body panels
- Toyota Corolla Levin and Sprinter Trueno, a sports-oriented model of the Corolla and Sprinter
  - Toyota AE86
- Toyota Corolla Ceres and Sprinter Marino, a hardtop variation of the E100 Corolla/Sprinter sedan
- Toyota GR Corolla, a high-performance variant of the E210 Corolla hatchback
- Toyota Corolla Rumion, a tall hatchback variation of the E150 series Corolla
- Toyota Matrix (Corolla Matrix), a hatchback/wagon based on the Corolla for the North American market
- Toyota Corolla Spacio, a mini MPV with the Corolla nameplate for the Japanese market
- Toyota Corolla Verso, a mini MPV with the Corolla nameplate for the European market
- Toyota Corolla Cross, a crossover SUV counterpart of the E210 series Corolla
- Toyota Corolla WRC, a World Rally Car based on the E110 Corolla hatchback
- Chevrolet Nova, a Chevrolet-rebadged Sprinter (North America, 1984–1988)
- Holden Nova, a Holden-rebadged Corolla (Australia, 1989–1996)
- Geo Prizm, a Geo-rebadged Sprinter (North America, 1989–1997)
- Chevrolet Prizm, a Chevrolet-rebadged Corolla (North America, 1997–2002)
