= Pontiac Vibe =

General Motors 2000s compact car developed with Toyota

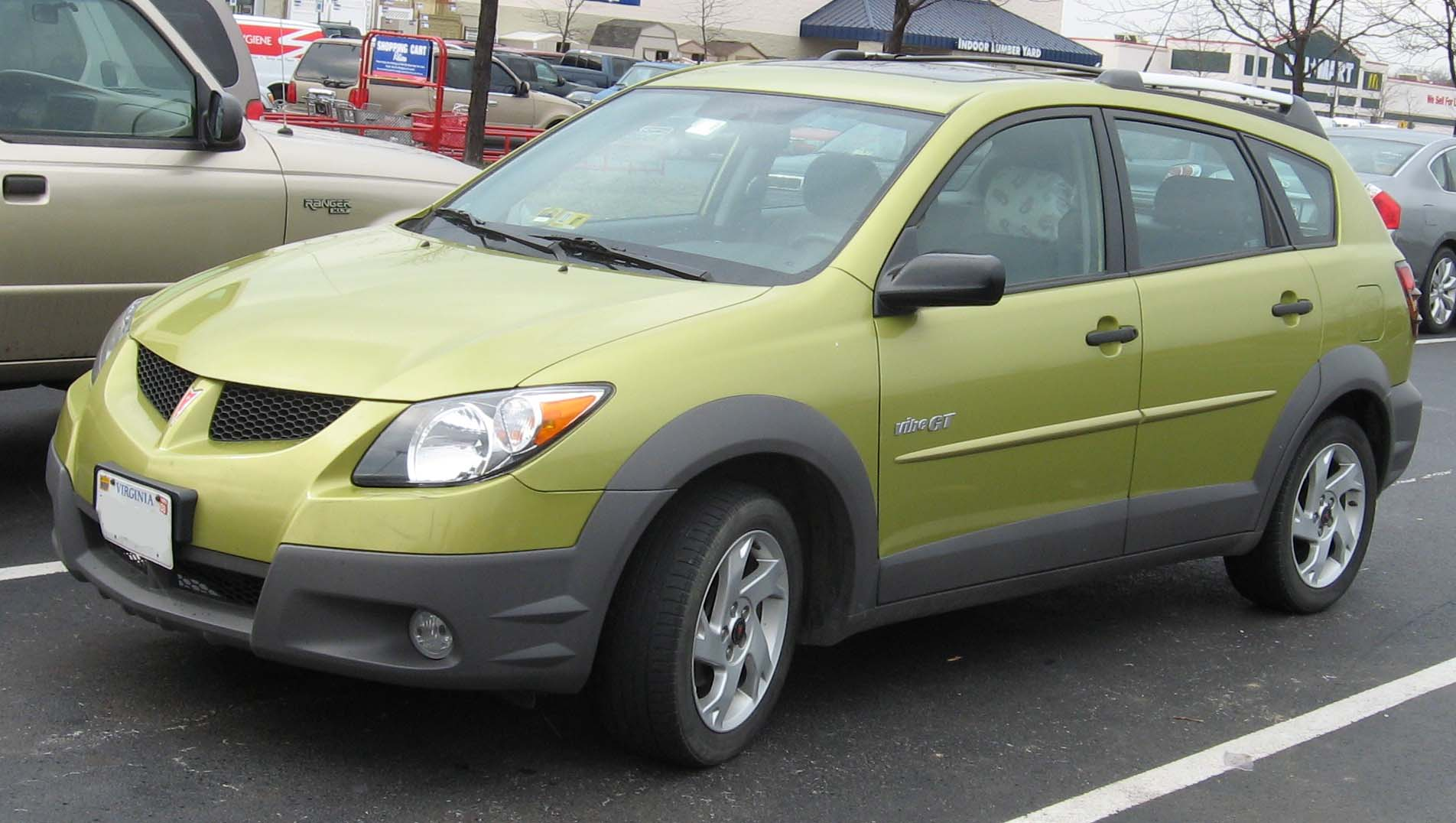
- 2003 Pontiac Vibe GT

Overview
- Manufacturer: NUMMI
- Also called: Toyota Voltz (Japan, 2002–2004)
- Production: January 2002 – August 2009
- Model years: 2003–2010
- Assembly: United States: Fremont, California (NUMMI)

Body and chassis
- Class: Compact car
- Body style: 5-door hatchback
- Layout: Front-engine, front-wheel-drive or all-wheel-drive
- Platform: Toyota MC platform

Dimensions
- Wheelbase: 102.4 in (2,601 mm)

Chronology
- Predecessor: Geo/Chevrolet Prizm; Toyota Opa (Japan, Voltz)
- Successor: Buick Encore; Buick Envision; Chevrolet Orlando (Canada); Chevrolet Cruze Hatchback; Chevrolet Trax; Toyota Auris (Japan, Voltz)

The Pontiac Vibe is a compact car that was marketed by Pontiac from the 2003 to 2010 model years. The first Pontiac sold only as a station wagon since the Pontiac Safari, the Vibe was the fourth and final GM-branded vehicle to come from the General Motors-Toyota NUMMI joint venture.

Sharing the GM S platform (Toyota MC platform) with the Toyota Matrix, the Vibe is derived from the Toyota Corolla, following the Chevrolet Nova and the Geo/Chevrolet Prizm. From 2002 to 2004, the Pontiac Vibe was marketed in Japan in right-hand drive under the Toyota Voltz nameplate.

The Pontiac Vibe was assembled by NUMMI in its Fremont, California facility alongside the Matrix, Corolla, and Tacoma. Production of the Vibe ended in August 2009 coinciding with the discontinuation of the Pontiac brand and the General Motors Chapter 11 reorganization leading to the closure of both the NUMMI joint venture and facility, with Toyota shifting production of the Matrix to Toyota Motor Manufacturing Canada in Cambridge, Ontario until its discontinuation.

== First generation (2002) ==
First generation
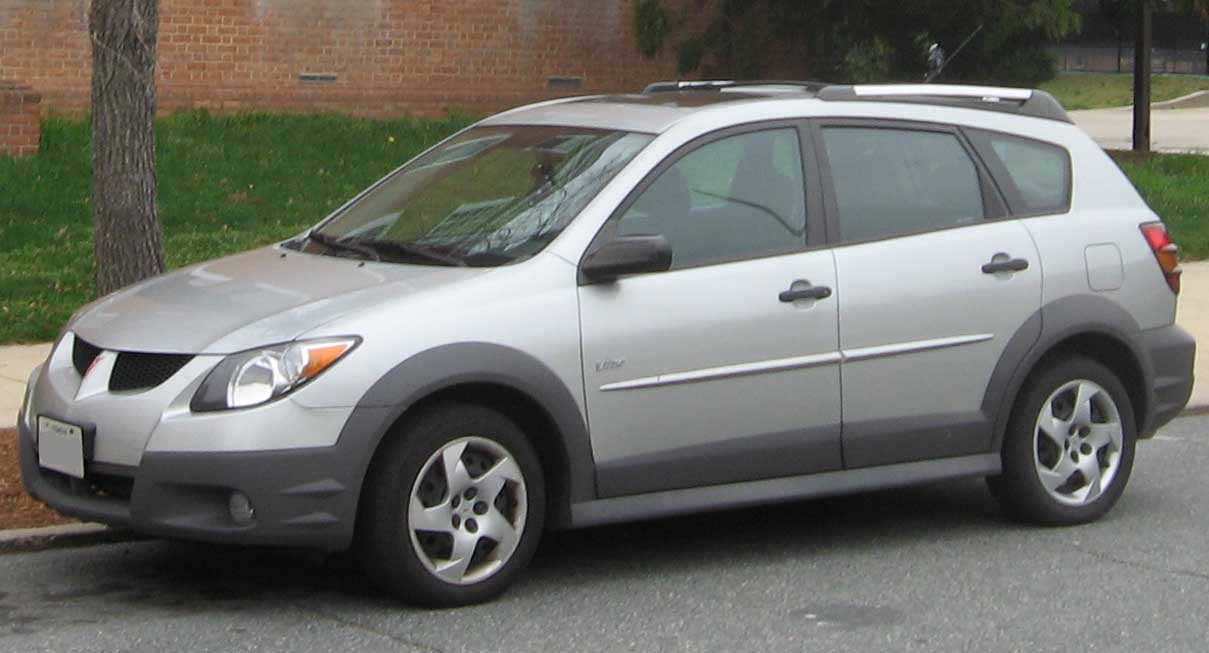

Overview
- Also called: Toyota Voltz (Japan)
- Production: January 2002 – February 2008
- Model years: 2003–2008
- Designer: John Mack

Body and chassis
- Related: Toyota Matrix (E130); Toyota Corolla (E130); Toyota Celica (T230); Toyota WiLL VS

Powertrain
- Engine: 1.8 L 1ZZ-FE (LV6) I4 (gasoline); 1.8 L 2ZZ-GE (LNK) I4 (gasoline)
- Transmission: 5-speed C59 manual; 6-speed C60 manual; 4-speed A246E automatic; 4-speed U341F AWD automatic

Dimensions
- Length: 171.3 in (4,351 mm)
- Width: 69.9 in (1,775 mm)
- Height: 61 in (1,549 mm)

The 2003–2006 Vibe was available in an economical base trim, an AWD mid-trim, and the more powerful GT sport trim. It was unveiled in November 2001.

Powertrains available for this car are a Toyota-built 1.8 L straight-4 16-valve engine producing 126 hp (94 kW) on the base model (manual or automatic transmission), 118 hp on the all-wheel drive model (automatic only), or a version with VVTL-i producing 164 hp (122 kW) for the GT (manual 6-speed only). The Vibe was at one time the most fuel efficient vehicle sold by GM in North America, but ceased to be the case with the revised United States Environmental Protection Agency testing procedures in 2008.

The Vibe varied from the Matrix by its styling and other components, including its air conditioning compressor and related hoses, the heater hoses, the heater core, and the serpentine belt.

The Vibe was first produced in 2002 and went on sale as a 2003 model. Power ratings for the first three model years were slightly higher, with the GT up to 180 hp (134 kW), the base model rated at 130 hp (97 kW), and the all-wheel drive model rated at 123 hp (92 kW). Engine power claims were decreased for 2006 as a result of Toyota's retesting of its engines for the new Society of Automotive Engineers (SAE) ratings standard. The GT and all-wheel-drive trims were discontinued for the 2007 model year due to poor sales and new federal emissions standards.

The front fascia was revised in the 2005 model year. In an attempt to 'converge' the Pontiac look, the front grille was restyled to resemble the look of the Pontiac Solstice, also adopted by other vehicles in the Pontiac line. The 2003-2004 Vibes had a front grille more closely resembling the Pontiac Aztek.

First generation Vibe/Matrix/Corolla odometers did not have the ability to "roll over" 299,999 km or 299,999 mi. No recall or "fix" is currently available; mileage must be recorded manually until a solution is found.

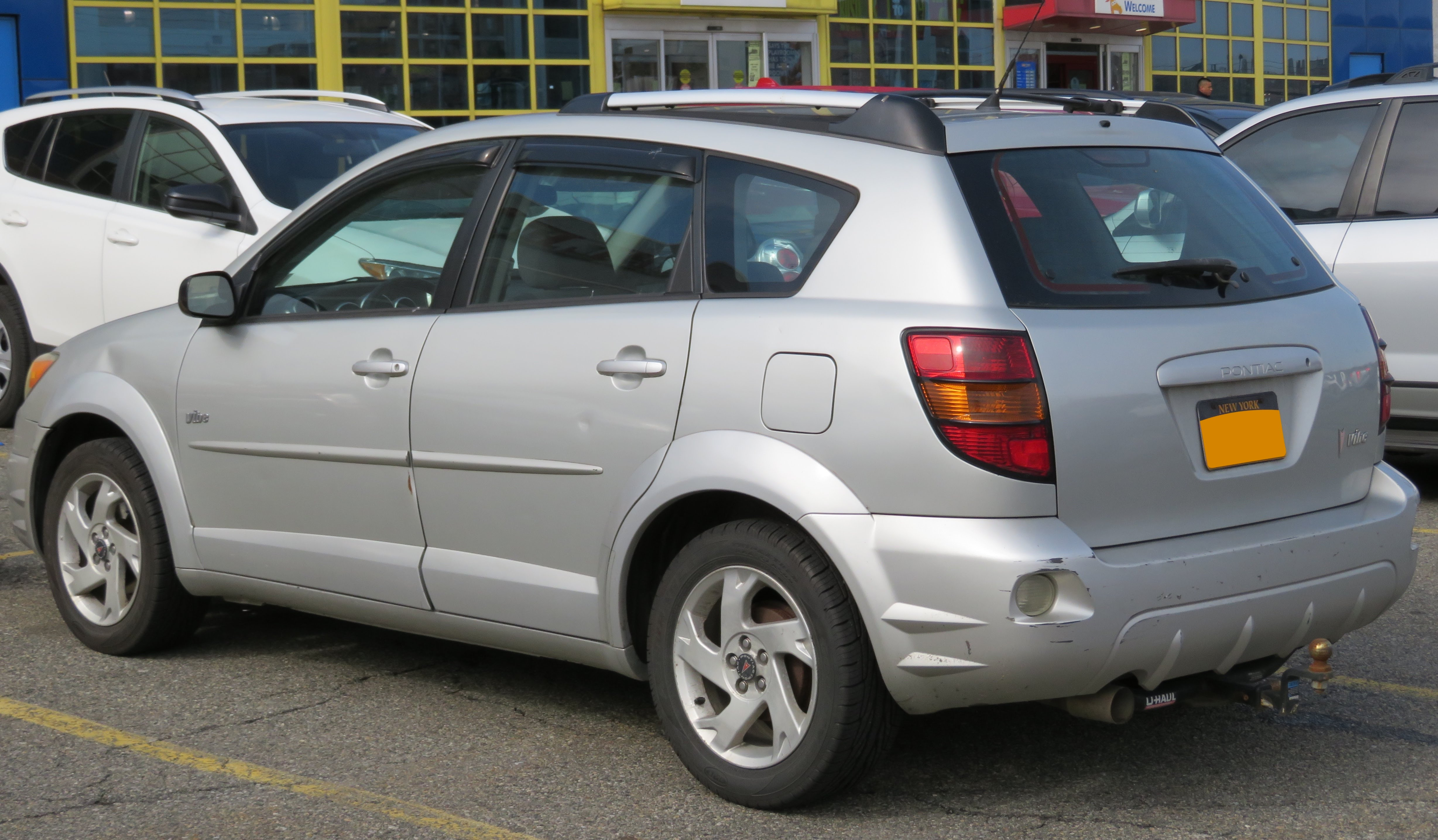
Pre-facelift Pontiac Vibe

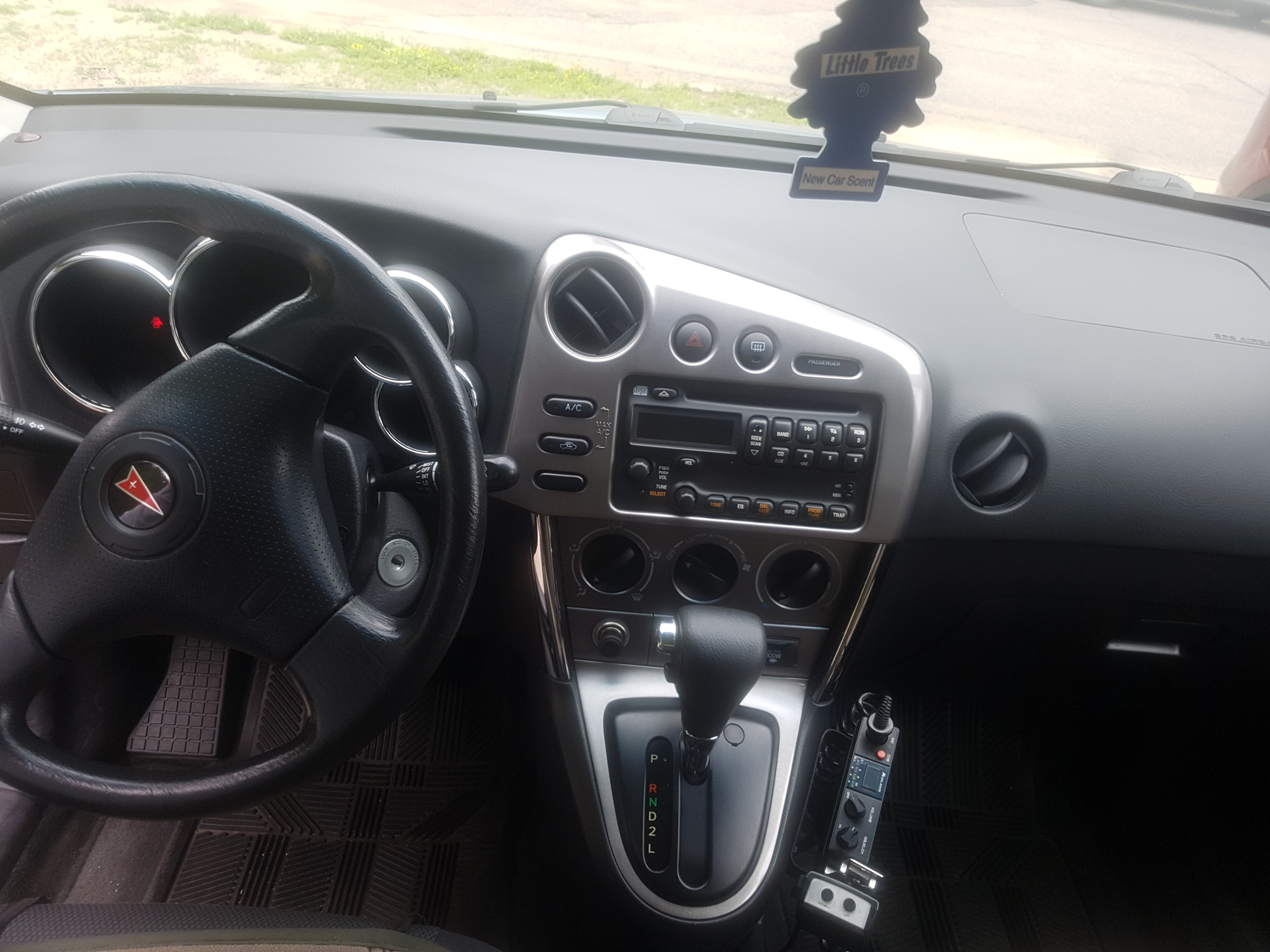
Pontiac Vibe interior

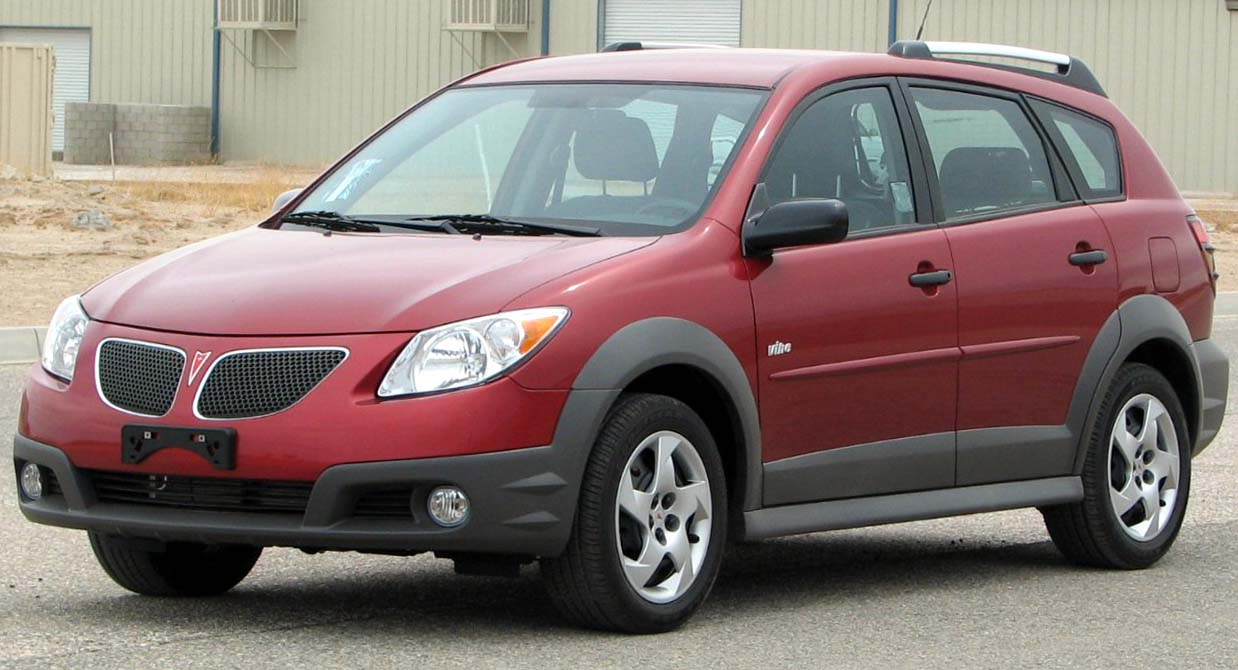
2007 Pontiac Vibe

=== Toyota Voltz ===
The Toyota Voltz (Japanese: トヨタ・ヴォルツ, Hepburn: Toyota Vorutsu) is a five-door hatchback that was marketed by Toyota from July 2002 to March 2004 in its home market of Japan. Manufactured by NUMMI alongside the Vibe, the Voltz was exported to Japan in place of the Toyota Matrix. In Japan, the model line was exclusive to Toyota Japanese dealerships called Toyota Netz Store.

With the exception of badging and side mirrors, the Voltz shared its exterior with the Vibe, including its Pontiac-designed twin front grilles. In place of Pontiac's Arrowhead logo, the Voltz wears a stylized "V" insignia in-between the grilles and foldable side mirrors as opposed to non-foldable mirrors due to regulation. Along with the customary fitment of right-hand drive, the Voltz differed from the Vibe by sharing its interior design with the Matrix. With just over 10,000 units sold, Toyota ended sales of the Voltz with the Toyota Auris as its closest functional successor.

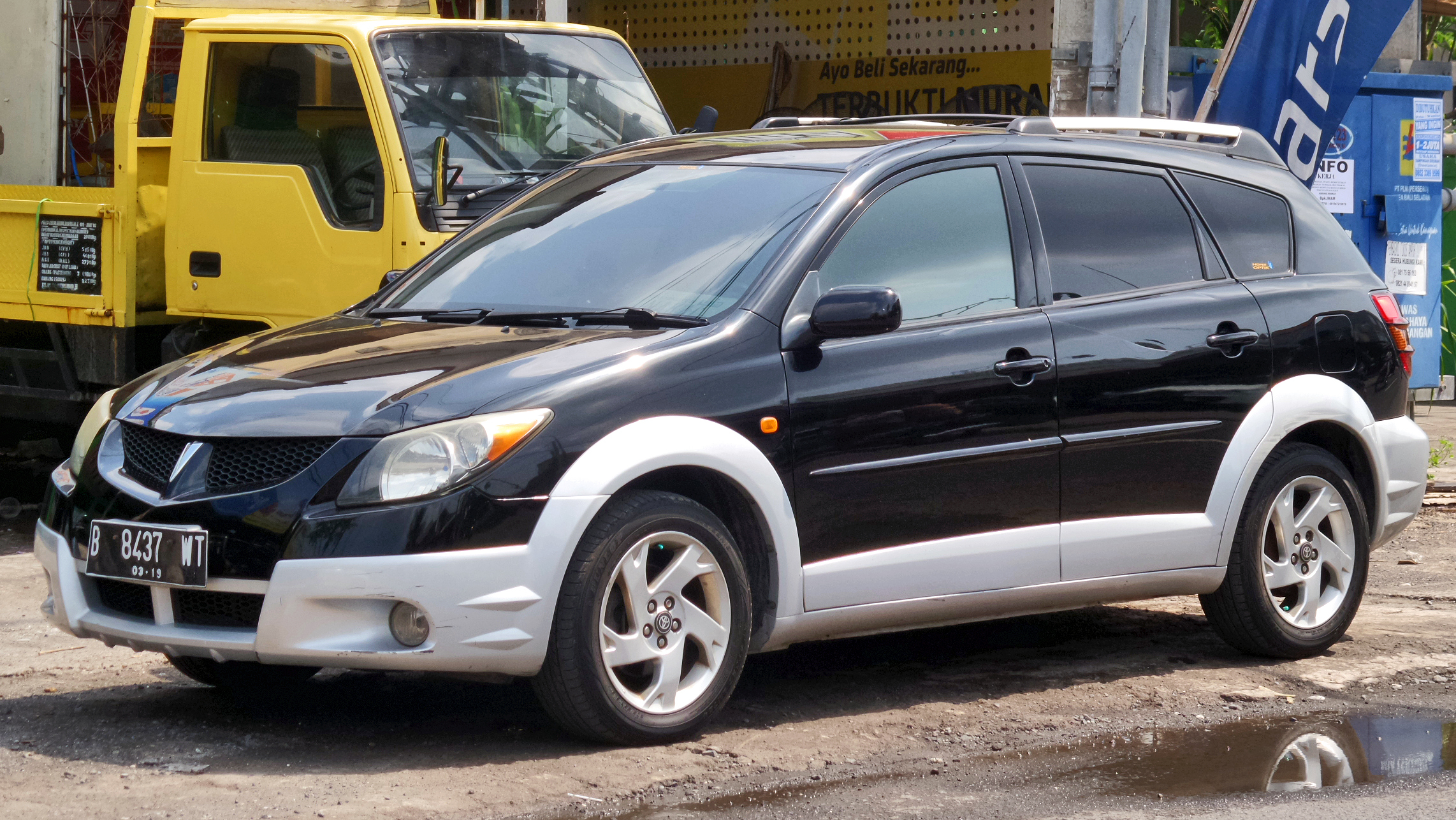
Toyota Voltz front

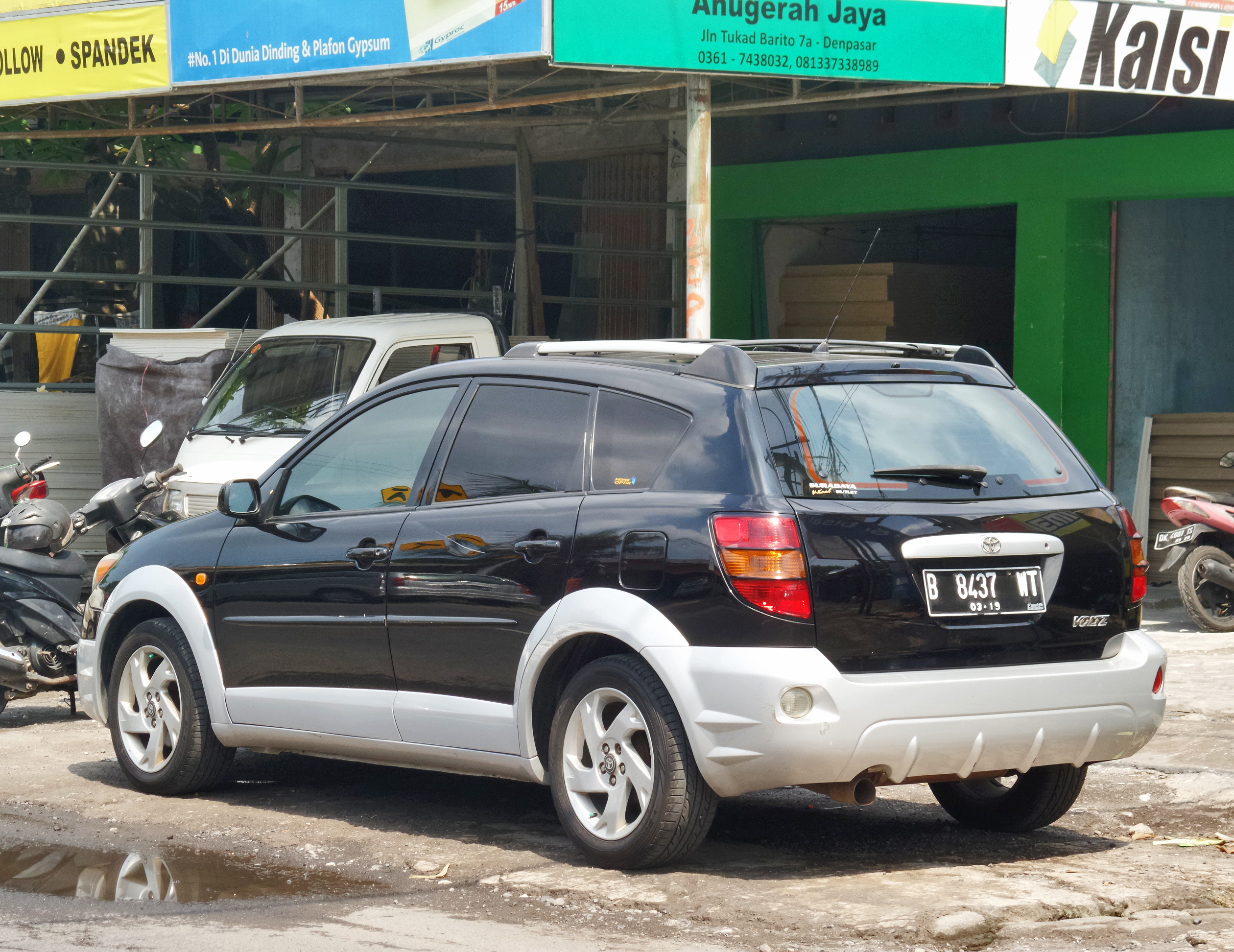
Toyota Voltz rear

== Second generation (2008) ==
Second generation
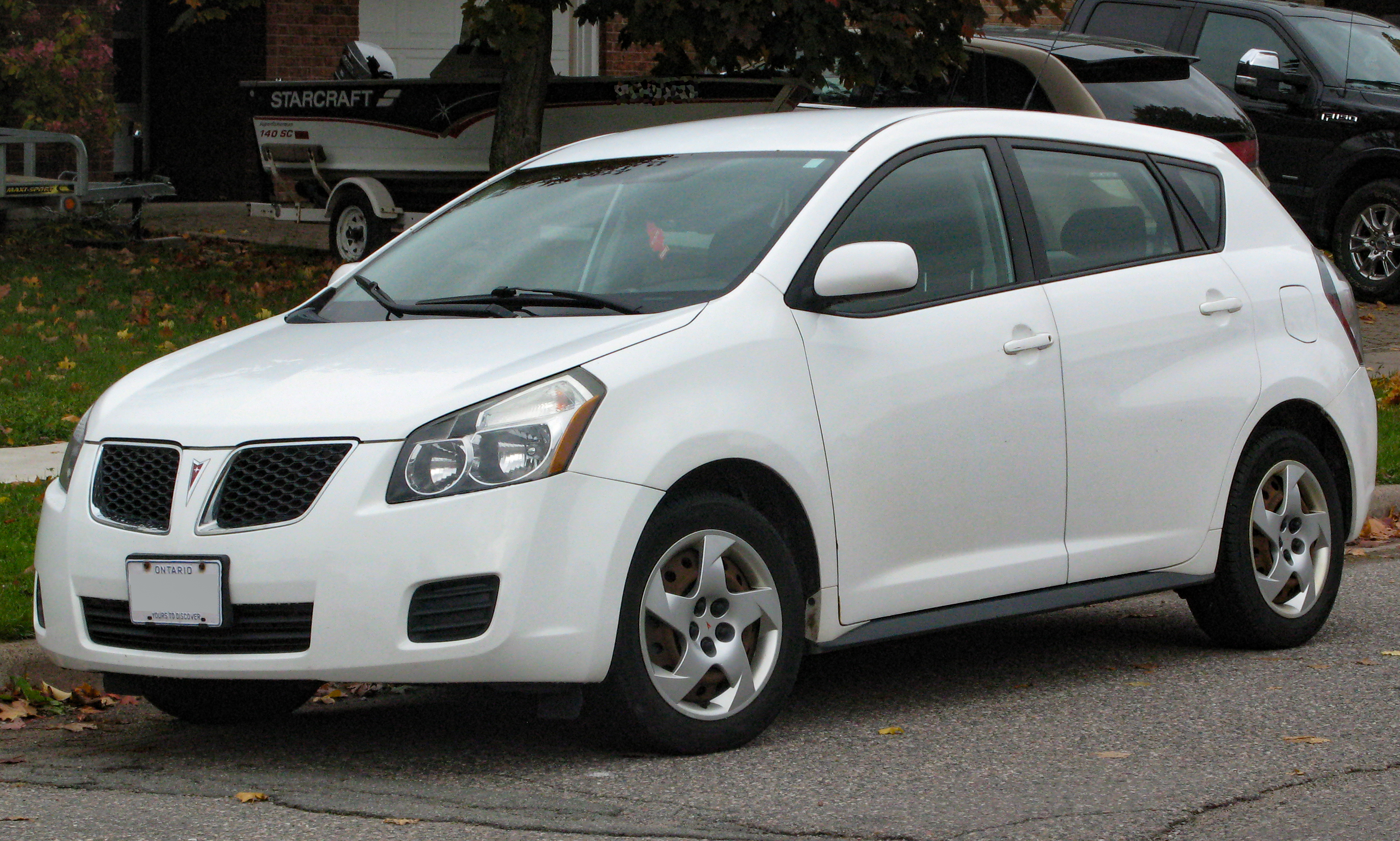

Overview
- Production: February 2008 – August 2009
- Model years: 2009–2010
- Designer: Ron Aselton

Body and chassis
- Related: Toyota Matrix (E140); Toyota Corolla (E140)

Powertrain
- Engine: 1.8 L 2ZR-FE I4; 2.4 L 2AZ-FE I4
- Transmission: 5-speed C59 manual (1.8); 5-speed E351 manual (2.4); 5-speed U250E automatic; 4-speed U140F AWD automatic; 4-speed U341E automatic

Dimensions
- Length: 172.1 in (4,371 mm); AWD: 171.9 in (4,366 mm)
- Width: 69.4 in (1,763 mm)
- Height: Base: 60.9 in (1,547 mm); AWD: 62.7 in (1,593 mm); GT: 61.3 in (1,557 mm)

The Vibe was redesigned, along with the Matrix, for the 2009 model year, and debuted at the December 2007 L.A. Auto Show. First deliveries to dealerships were posted on GM's Website in April 2008, with comments that initial sales were brisk. The first units were delivered to buyers in early March. "The new Vibe's design is sporty yet completely functional," according to Ron Aselton, chief designer. "Clean lines, minimal overhangs, and wheels pushed to the corners give the vehicle a muscular stance."

The GT trim and AWD options return, and two new straight-four engines (Toyota's 2.4-liter 2AZ-FE was also used on the Camry (and the 2005–2008 RAV4) for the AWD and GT trims as well as optional on the base trim, and a new 1.8-liter 2ZR-FE standard on the base trim) are offered. This was also Pontiac's last new model and remained as the brand's only remaining car for the 2010 model year. GM ceased Vibe's production in August 2009.

The second generation FWD Vibes also offered computerized traction control and StabiliTrak traction control. Like the first generation, it offered anti-lock brakes. Rear disc brakes were standard on all models. Luggage racks were no longer standard order. Power output for the 1.8-liter was 132 hp (98 kW) while power output for the 2.4-liter was 158 hp (118 kW) at 5600 rpm and 162 lb⋅ft (220 N⋅m) at 4000 rpm.

The Vibe offered 91.4 cubic feet (2.59 m^{3}) of passenger volume (all seats up) and 20.1 cubic feet (0.57 m^{3}) of cargo volume, for a total of 111.5 cubic feet (3.16 m^{3}) with rear seats that folded completely flat. The cargo area was 30 inches (760 mm) high and 40 inches (1,000 mm) wide, which is large enough to accommodate a standard-sized, North American washing machine or clothes dryer with enough extra room for an appliance dolly.

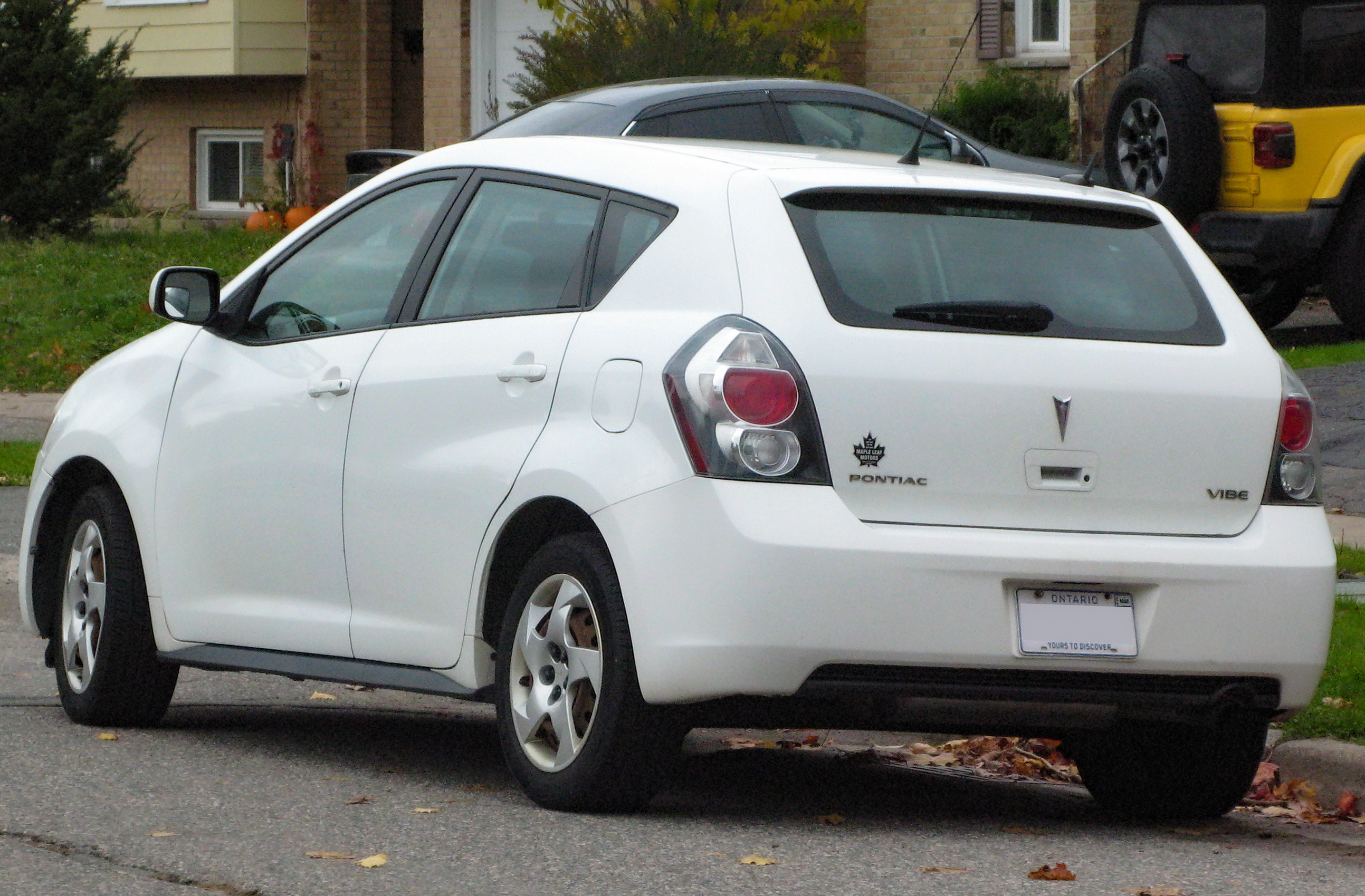
Rear view

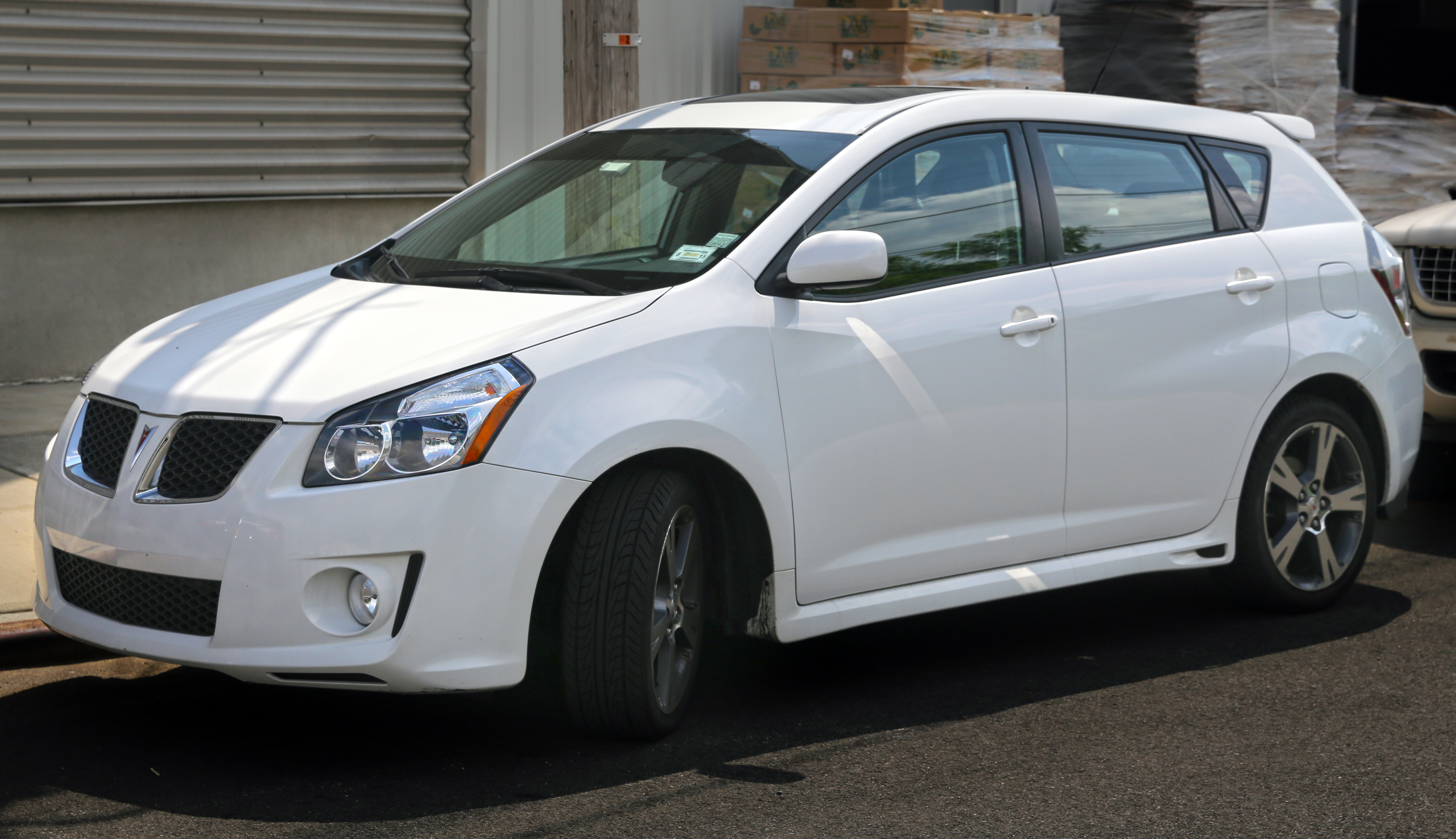
Pontiac Vibe GT

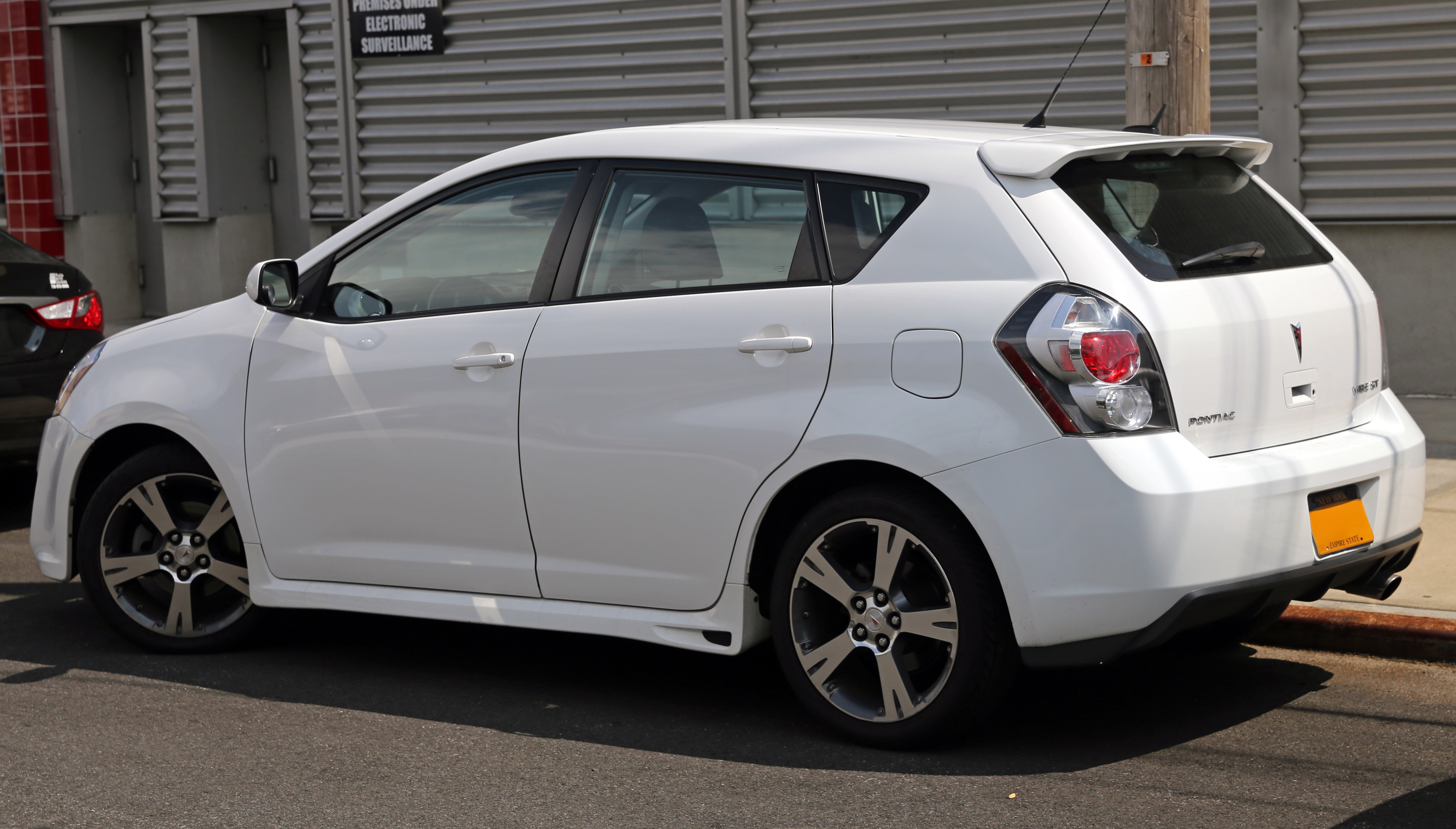
Pontiac Vibe GT

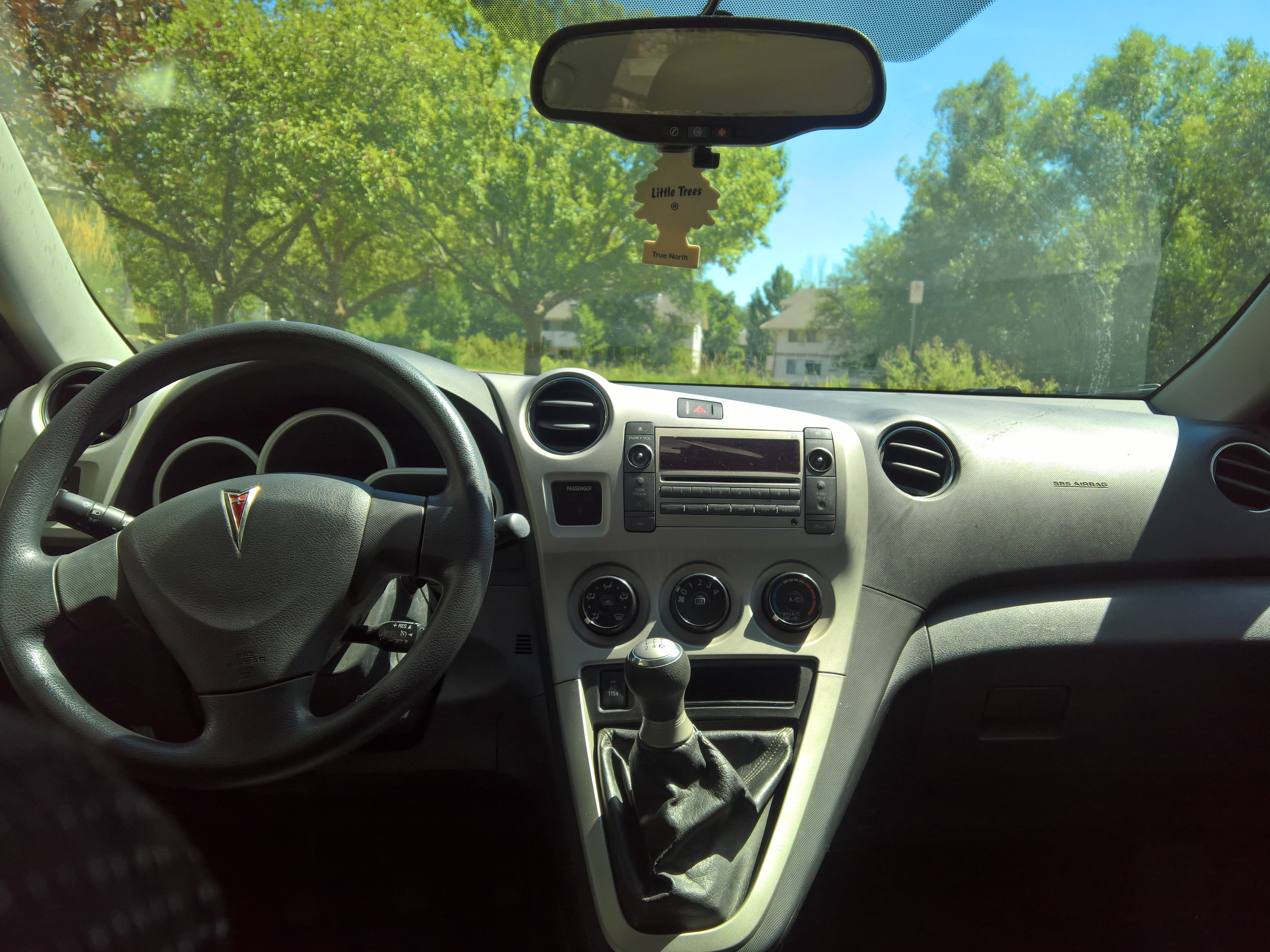
2009 Pontiac Vibe interior

== Discontinuation ==
On April 27, 2009, GM announced the discontinuation of Vibe production, as well as all other Pontiac models, by the end of 2010. It was later announced that Vibe production would end in August 2009, and the last Vibe left the assembly line on August 17, 2009, according to a source at genvibe.com. This left Toyota with a major problem as they had to scramble to relocate some of the tooling that was jointly used to produce the Matrix in another factory.

GM did not initially produce a compact hatchback to succeed the Pontiac Vibe, choosing to bracket it with the Chevrolet Sonic hatchback and Buick Encore small crossover. In Canada, GM followed the Vibe with the larger Chevrolet Orlando compact MPV, which replaced the Chevrolet HHR. Chevrolet introduced a hatchback version of the Chevrolet Cruze to North America in 2016.

== Recalls ==
In January 2010, Autoblog.com reported that the 2009 and 2010 model year Pontiac Vibes are also included in the 2009–2010 Toyota vehicle recalls related to unintended acceleration due to shared components with the Toyota Matrix. Another recall for the Vibe was issued in the Fall of 2009 due to floormat interference with the accelerator pedals. This is also part of the Toyota recall.

On August 26, 2010, another recall was issued for 2005 to 2008 model year Vibes, equipped with the 1ZZ-FE engine and two-wheel drive. The recall notices states that an improperly manufactured Engine Control Module (ECM) can develop a crack in its circuitry, potentially causing the "Check Engine" light to illuminate, harsh shifting, and stalling and/or failure of the engine to start.

In mid-October 2014 the Vibe along with the Saab 9-2x was recalled due to the faulty Takata airbags supplied from the large airbag supplier company. It is undetermined how many Vibes have been recalled.

== Sales ==
Calendar year	U.S.	Canada
2002	39,082	N/A
2003	56,922	N/A
2004	58,894	10,025
2005	64,271	11,363
2006	45,221	11,444
2007	37,170	12,915
2008	46,551	17,335
2009	33,842	11,537
2010	97	1,559
