= Toyota ZZ engine =

Type of engine created by Toyota

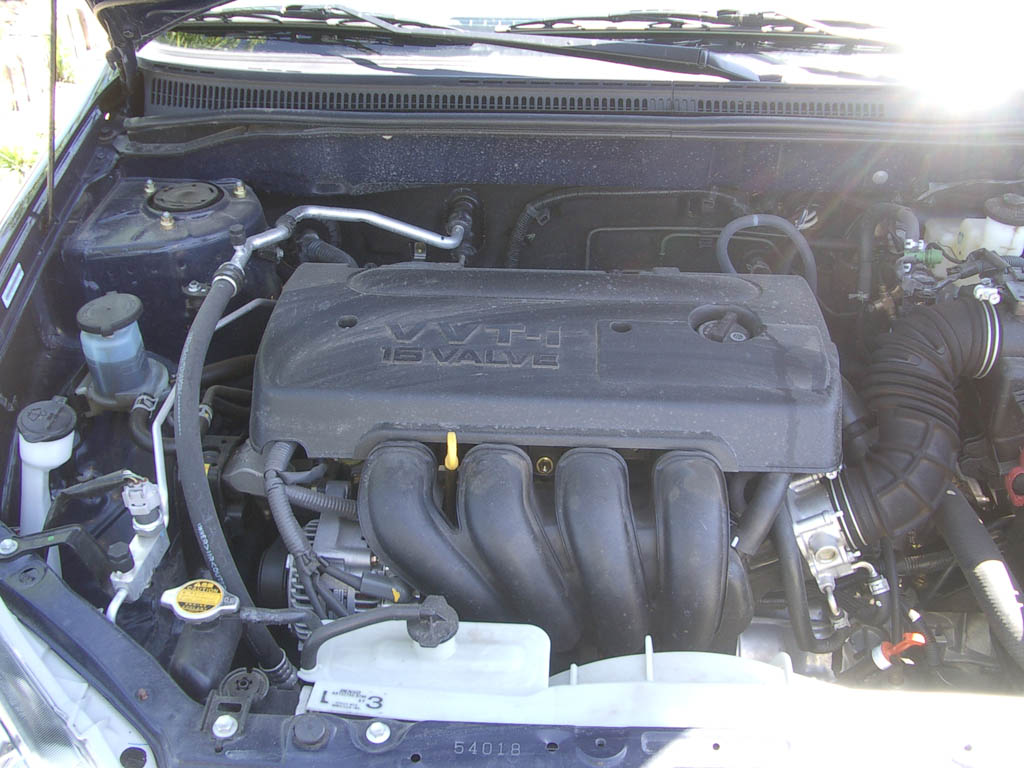
- 2005 Toyota Corolla S engine

Overview
- Manufacturer: Toyota
- Production: 1997–2008

Layout
- Configuration: Straight-4
- Displacement: 1.4 L; 85.3 cu in (1,398 cc); 1.6 L; 97.5 cu in (1,598 cc); 1.8 L; 109.5 cu in (1,794 cc); 1.8 L; 109.6 cu in (1,796 cc)
- Cylinder bore: 79 mm (3.11 in); 82 mm (3.23 in)
- Piston stroke: 71.3 mm (2.81 in); 81.5 mm (3.21 in); 85 mm (3.35 in); 91.5 mm (3.60 in)
- Cylinder block material: Aluminium, Cast iron
- Cylinder head material: Aluminium
- Valvetrain: DOHC 4 valves x cyl. with VVT-i and VVTL-i (some versions)
- Compression ratio: 10.0:1, 11.5:1

Combustion
- Supercharger: TRD (some versions)
- Fuel system: Multi-point fuel injection
- Fuel type: Gasoline
- Cooling system: Water-cooled

Chronology
- Predecessor: A engine
- Successor: ZR engine (for 1ZZ and 2ZZ series)

The Toyota ZZ engine family is a straight-4 piston engine series. The ZZ series uses a die-cast aluminium engine block with thin press-fit cast iron cylinder liners, aluminium DOHC 4-valve cylinder heads, and chain-driven camshafts. The ZZ family replaced the extremely popular cast-iron block 4A and 7A engines of the preceding A family of engines.

The two 1.8 L members of the family, the 1ZZ and 2ZZ, use different bore and stroke. The former was optimised for economy, with torque emphasised in lower revolutions per minute operating range, while the latter is a "square" design optimised for high-RPM torque, yielding higher peak power.

== Model code breakdown ==
Toyota engine names are interpreted as follows. The leading number denotes the generation, and the next one or two letters, specify the engine family. The remaining letters, following a hyphen, describe the engine's major features. For example, the 2ZZ-GE can be decoded as being the second generation of the ZZ engine series and features a performance-oriented cylinder head with widely angled valves (G) and electronic fuel injection (E).

For more information on Toyota's engine naming conventions, see list of Toyota engines.

== 1ZZ ==
=== 1ZZ-FE ===
The 1ZZ-FE is a 1.8 L (1,794 cc) version. Bore x stroke of 79 mm × 91.5 mm (3.11 in × 3.60 in). Compression ratio is 10.0:1. It uses MPFI, has VVT-i (1998-99 1ZZ engines don't have VVT-i), and features fracture-split forged powder metal connecting rods, one-piece cast camshafts, and either a cast aluminum intake manifold or a molded plastic intake manifold.

Two distinct versions of the 1ZZ-FE were manufactured, one at both the Toyota Motor Manufacturing West Virginia plant in the United States and the Toyota Motor Manufacturing Canada plant in Canada and the other at the Shimoyama plant in Japan.

==== North America ====
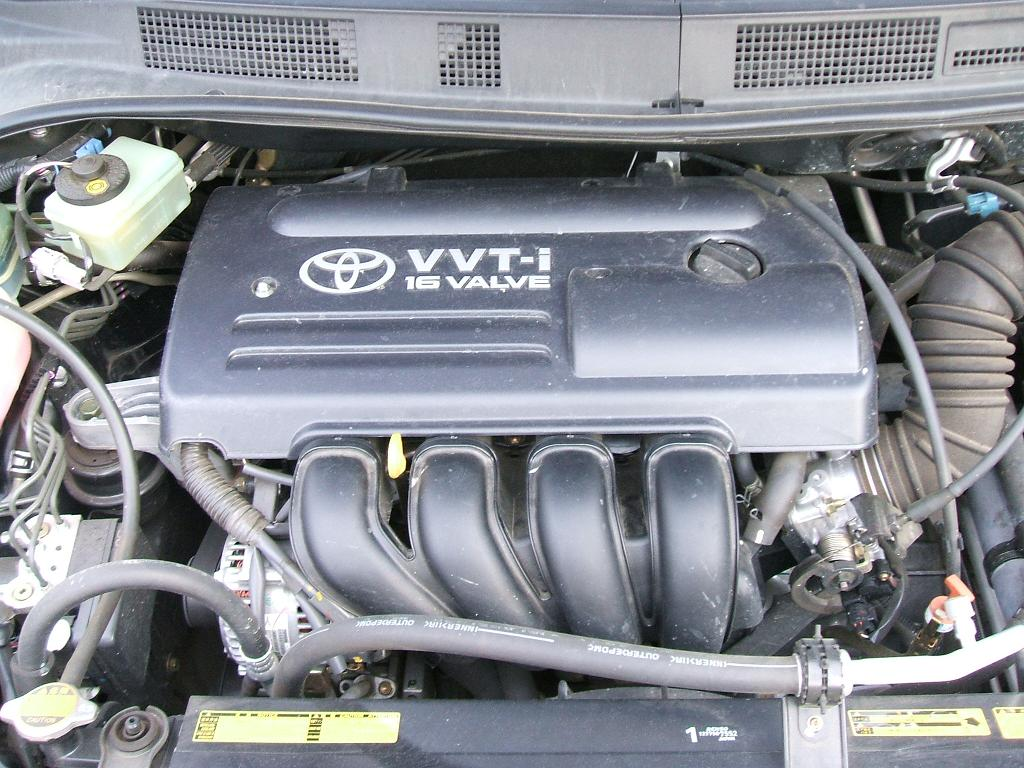
1ZZ-FE

Primarily built in the United States at Buffalo, West Virginia, the most common version of the 1ZZ-FE has outputs between 120 bhp (122 PS; 89 kW) at 5,600 rpm with 122 lbf⋅ft (165 N⋅m) of torque at 4,400 rpm, and 130 bhp (132 PS; 97 kW) at 6,400 rpm with 126 lbf⋅ft (171 N⋅m) of torque at 4,200 rpm. The North American 1ZZ-FE has been exported worldwide, with differing figures in outputs for certain countries. Production at Cambridge, Ontario was discontinued in December 2007, while production at Buffalo, West Virginia was halted in 2008.

A factory supported bolt-on supercharger kit for the 1ZZ-FE was sold for the 2003–2004 Corolla and Matrix by Toyota Racing Development, and Pontiac Vibe by GM Performance. The supercharger gives 7.5 pounds per square inch (0.52 bar) of boost, with a 40 horsepower (30 kW; 41 PS) and 38 lb⋅ft (52 N⋅m) of torque increase at the wheels.

Toyota announced a voluntary recall of 2005 to 2008 Toyota Corollas and Matrixes equipped with the 1ZZ-FE engines. The issue involves the engine control module, and includes the potential for it to develop a crack on the module's circuit board, which can result in the car not starting, the transmission shifting harshly, or the engine stalling. Additionally, General Motors announced a voluntary recall of Pontiac Vibes from years 2005 to 2008 for the same issue.

Applications:

- Toyota Corolla (E110)
- Toyota Corolla (E120) CE/LE/S/VE, Altis (Asia)
- Toyota Corolla Verso
- Toyota RAV4
- Chevrolet Prizm
- Pontiac Vibe
- Toyota Celica GT
- Toyota Matrix
- Toyota MR2 (W30)
- Toyota Avensis
- Lotus Elise
- Toyota Wish

==== Japan ====
Built in Japan at the Shimoyama plant in Miyoshi, Aichi, it is similar to the one built in North America except that it has larger (32 mm) intake valves and (27.5 mm) exhaust valves with corresponding revisions to the ports, resulting in higher power output compared to the North American 1ZZ-FE. Like its North American counterpart, the Japanese 1ZZ-FE uses Multi-point fuel injection along with VVT-i. Toyota's advertised power output for the Japanese variant is 140 bhp (142 PS; 104 kW) at 6,400 rpm and 127 lb⋅ft (172 N⋅m) of torque at 4,400 rpm. It can be found in various Toyota vehicles in Japan.

It was widely believed that the Japanese variant was labeled as "1ZZ-FED", however there has been no evidence of the "FED" suffix being used in Toyota's official documentation or labeling of its vehicles. All of the vehicles in the list below simply use the 1ZZ-FE designation without the "D" letter after the engine code. Most likely this was a way for Toyota to change something internal about the engine without changing its designation (the 4A-FE for example went through three iterations without changing its name for the same reason).

Applications:

- Toyota Corolla (E120) Fielder, RunX S, Allex (Japan)
- Toyota Corolla (E140) Axio, Fielder (Japan)
- Toyota Corolla Spacio
- Toyota Celica (ZZT230, Japan Only)
- Toyota MR-S / MR2 Spyder
- Toyota Allion and Premio
- Toyota Vista and Vista Ardeo
- Toyota Caldina
- Toyota Opa
- Toyota Isis
- Toyota Wish
- WiLL VS

=== 1ZZ-FBE ===
A special modified variation of the 1ZZ-FE that can run on E100 Ethanol.

Applications:

- Toyota Corolla (Brazil only) 100 kW (136 PS)

=== LJ479Q ===
An internal code of the 1ZZ-FE used for SAIC-GM-Wuling cars.

Applications:

- Baojun 530
- Baojun 560
- Baojun 730/Wuling Cortez
- Wuling Rongguang truck
- Wuling Zhengcheng

=== Excessive oil consumption issues ===
The 1ZZ engines (particularly the 1ZZ-FE) was notoriously known for excess oil consumption, especially in earlier models from the 1990s to the 2000s. The problem stemmed from an inherent design flaw in the engine with its undersized piston rings and insufficient oil drainage holes in the pistons. Over time, this led to oil blow-by, where excessive oil would enter the combustion chamber, causing the engine to start burning oil. Owners often reported needing to add oil between changes, with some engines consuming up to a quart every 1,000 miles. This leads to shortened oil changes, significantly increasing running costs and hassle. Models made from 2005 onward received revised pistons and rings, which resolved this issue.

== 2ZZ ==
=== 2ZZ-GE ===
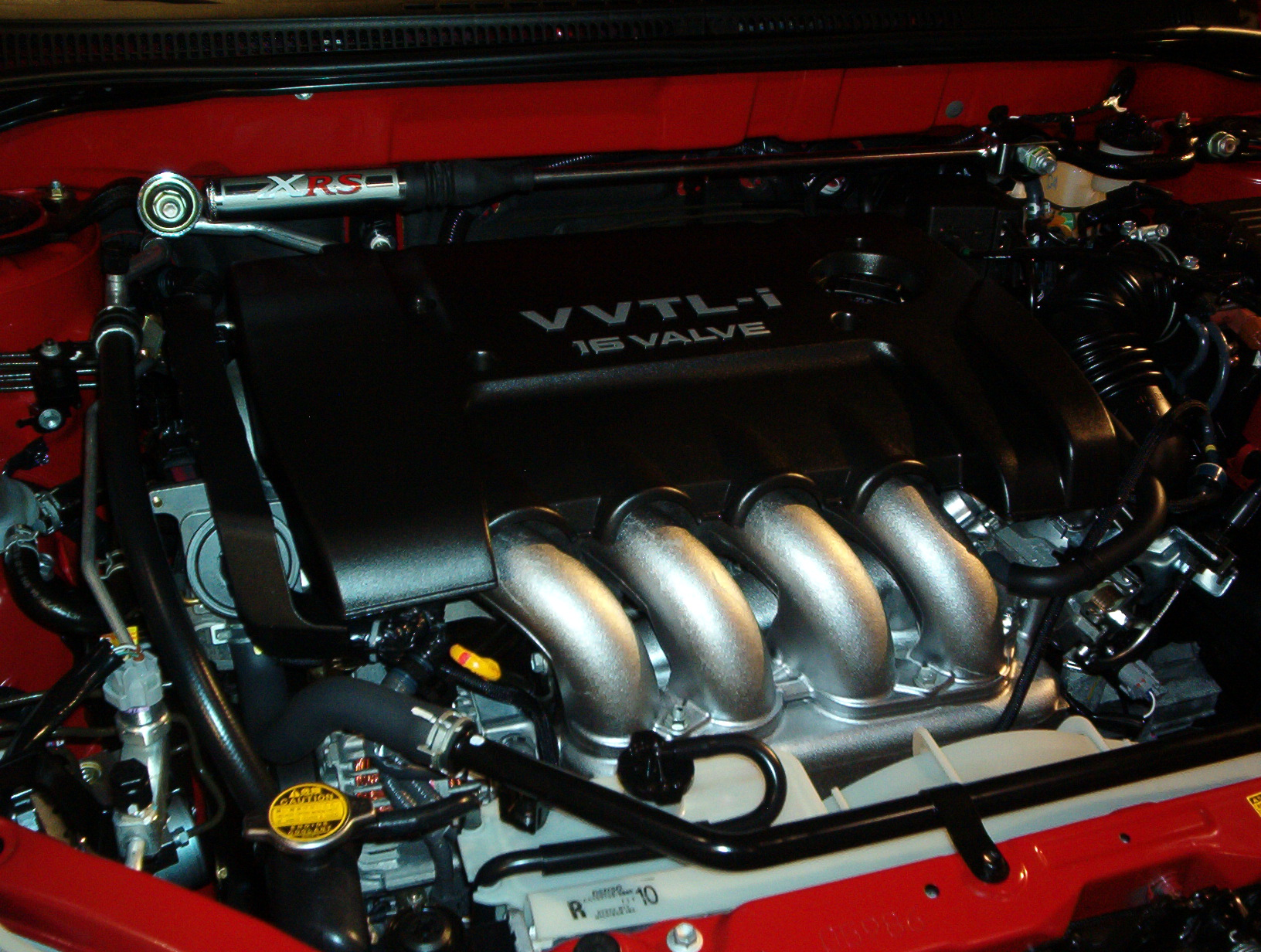
2ZZ-GE Engine in the Corolla XRS

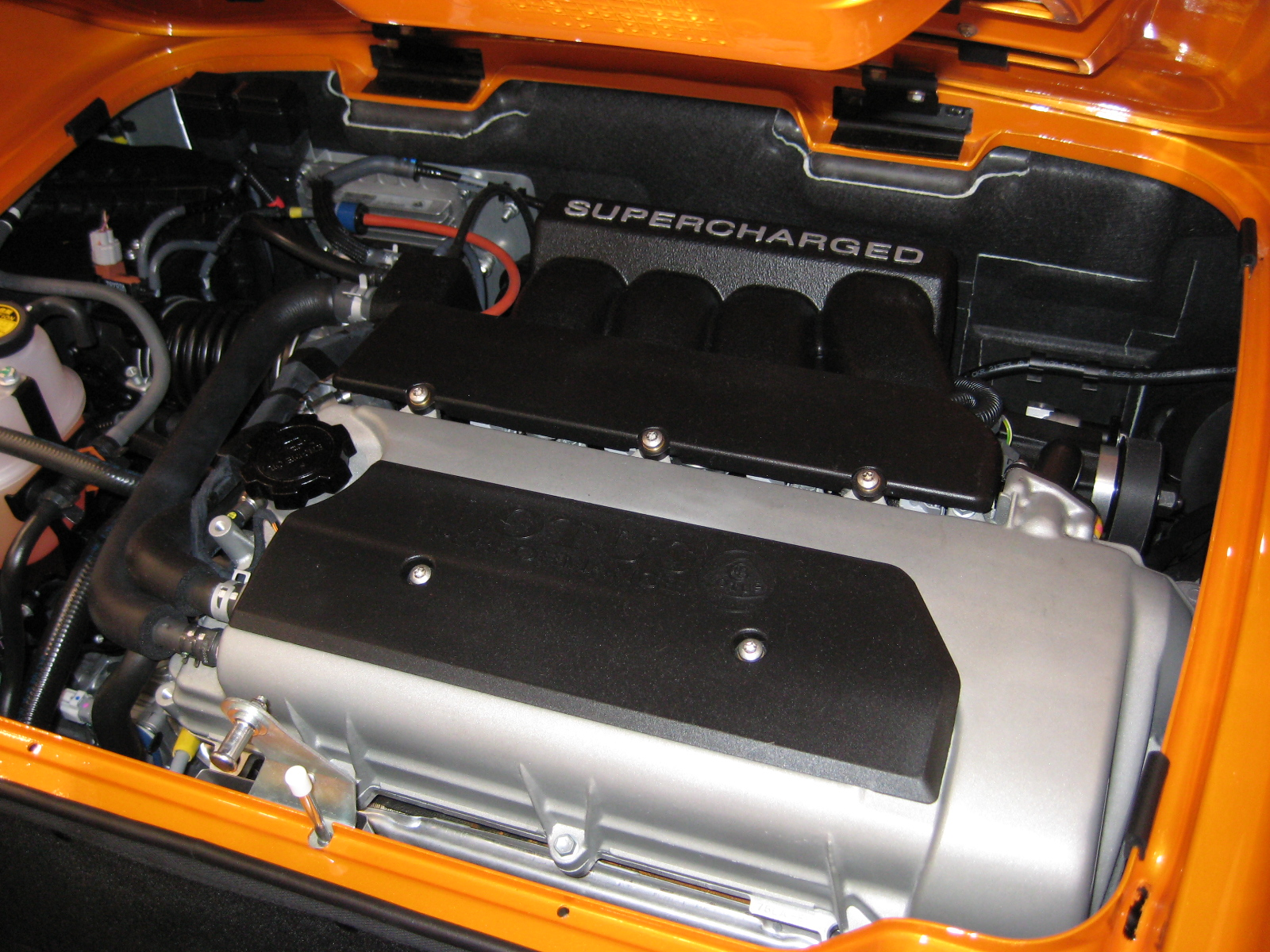
Supercharged 2ZZ-GE installed in Lotus Elise SC

The 2ZZ-GE is a 1.8 L; 109.6 cu in (1,796 cc) version built in Japan, in collaboration with Yamaha Motor Corporation. Bore x stroke is 82 mm × 85 mm (3.23 in × 3.35 in). It uses Multi-point Fuel Injection, VVTL-i, and features forged steel connecting rods. Compression ratio is 11.5:1, necessitating high-octane gasoline (91 octane or above in the (R+M)/2 scale used in North America).

Power output for this engine varies depending on the vehicle and tuning, with the Celica GT-S, Corolla T-Sport, Lotus Elise and Lotus Exige offering 141 kW (192 PS; 189 hp), whereas the American versions of the 2003 Matrix and Pontiac Vibe versions produce 180 hp (134 kW) at 7,600 rpm and 130 lb⋅ft (176 N⋅m) at 6800 rpm, with all later years offering anywhere from 173 hp (129 kW) in 2004 to 164 hp (122 kW) in 2006 due to a recurved powerband. Due to noise regulations, Toyota recalled them for a flash of the PCM to up their output to classify them in the more lenient "sports car" noise category. The Australian variant Corolla Sportivo produces 141 kW (192 PS; 189 hp) at 7,600 rpm and 181 N⋅m (133 lb⋅ft) of torque.

The Corolla Compressor and Lotus Exige S add an Eaton M62 supercharger with intercooler to achieve 168 kW (228 PS; 225 hp), while the output of the Exige 240R is 179 kW (243 PS; 240 hp) and on the Exige S 260 it is 192 kW (261 PS; 257 hp). The addition of a non-intercooled supercharger to the Elise SC produces 163 kW (221 PS; 218 hp), along with a considerable weight saving. These supercharged engines are not labeled with the "Z" suffix as would be expected in other supercharged Toyota engines (i.e. the supercharged 2ZZ-GE is not named as "2ZZ-GZE").

Toyota commissioned Yamaha to design the 2ZZ-GE, based on Toyota's ZZ block, for high-RPM operation and producing a power peak near the top of the RPM range. Its die-cast aluminum alloy engine block has Metal Matrix Composite (MMC) cylinder liners, a reinforcement material composed of ceramic parts and fibers, rather than a cast-iron one that was used in the 1ZZ-FE.

Unique to the ZZ family, the 2ZZ-GE utilizes a dual camshaft profile system (the "L" in VVTL-i, known by enthusiasts and engineers alike as "lift" similar to Honda's VTEC) to produce the added power without an increase in displacement or forced induction. The 2ZZ-GE was the first production engine to combine cam-phasing variable valve timing with dual-profile variable valve lift in the American market. The table below lists the specifications of the two camshaft profiles.

	Intake		Exhaust	
	Duration	Valve lift	Duration	Valve lift
Low Cam	228°	7.6 mm (0.30 in)	228°	7.6 mm (0.30 in)
High Cam	292°	11.2 mm (0.44 in)	276°	10 mm (0.39 in)

The high-output cam profile is not activated until approximately 6,200 rpm, (lift set-points are between 6,000–6,700 rpm depending on the vehicle) and will not engage until the engine has reached at least 60 °C (140 °F). The Toyota PCM electronically limits RPM to about 8,200 rpm via fuel and/or spark cut. The "lift" engagement and the engine redline vary by application. Lotus 2ZZ-GEs are rev limited to 8,500 RPM, for example, whereas Celicas were rev limited to 7,900 to 8,200 rpm in North America, depending on the model year. The first Japanese versions were rev limited to 8,600 rpm with a peak of 190 PS (140 kW).

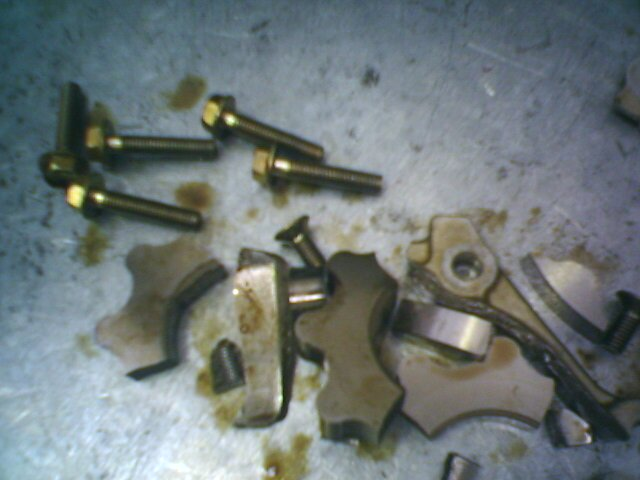
Disintegrated oil pump

Consequently, it is impossible to "over-rev" the engine with the throttle alone; a downshift from a higher gear must be involved. A typical "over-rev" can damage the oil pump, commonly disintegrating the lobe ring, resulting in damage similar to the picture at right. The oil pump is the Achilles heel of the 2ZZ, though incidents are rare and usually occur due to fault of the driver. Even the briefest period of oil starvation is usually fatal to this engine design.

For the first few years of production, the engines were notorious for failing "lift bolts". This did not damage the engine, but would hamper performance as the high output cam profile was unable to properly engage. Toyota fixed the problem in late 2002 with a redesigned bolt that was installed on later engines. Earlier engines with the problematic bolts can be fixed via a Toyota-issued TSB simply requiring the new bolt to be installed in place of the old one.

The 2004 and newer Matrix and Corolla XRS models were equipped with smog pumps and have an extra hole above each exhaust port in the engine head and manifold where air is injected to achieve complete fuel burning before the exhaust stream reaches the catalyst. All 2ZZ-GE heads from 03/03 onwards carry this modification even if the vehicle does not have the air injection system.

The 2ZZ-GE remains as one of the highest output per liter and the highest revving mass production engines ever made. It has won the International Engine of the Year category for 1.4 to 1.8-liter engines in 2002 in recognition of its incredible power output.

Applications:

- Toyota Celica SS-II – Japan, 140 kW (190 PS; 187 hp)
- Toyota Celica TRD M Sport – Japan, 203 PS (149 kW; 200 hp), 188 N⋅m (139 lb⋅ft)
- Toyota Celica GT-S – USA, 180 hp (134 kW; 182 PS))
- Toyota Celica 190/T-Sport – UK, 189 hp (141 kW; 192 PS))
- Toyota Celica SX – Australia, 189 hp (141 kW; 192 PS), 180 N⋅m (133 lb⋅ft)
- Toyota Celica ZR – Australia, 189 hp (141 kW; 192 PS), 180 N⋅m (133 lb⋅ft)
- Toyota Corolla Sportivo – Australia, 189 hp (141 kW; 192 PS), 180 N⋅m (133 lbf⋅ft)
- Toyota Celica T Sport – Europe, 141 kW (192 PS; 189 hp)
- Toyota Corolla (E120) T Sport Compressor – Europe, supercharged, 165 kW (225 PS; 222 hp)
- Toyota Corolla XRS – USA, 164 / 170 hp (122 / 127 kW; 166 / 172 PS)
- Toyota Corolla Fielder Z Aero Tourer – Japan, 140 kW (190 PS; 187 hp)
- Toyota Corolla "RunX Z Aero Tourer" – Japan, 140 kW (190 PS; 187 hp)
- Toyota Corolla RunX RSi – South Africa, 141 kW (192 PS; 189 hp)/180 N⋅m (133 lbf⋅ft)
- Toyota Matrix XRS – USA, 164–180 hp (122–134 kW; 166–182 PS)
- Pontiac Vibe GT – USA, 164–180 hp (122–134 kW; 166–182 PS)
- Toyota Voltz Z – Japan, 132 kW (180 PS; 178 hp)
- WiLL VS 1.8
- Lotus Elise – North America/UK, 190 hp (142 kW; 193 PS)
- Lotus Exige – USA/UK, 190 hp (142 kW; 193 PS) NA and 243 hp (181 kW; 246 PS) supercharged)
- Lotus Exige CUP 260 – USA/UK, supercharged, 260 PS (191 kW; 256 hp)
- Lotus 2-Eleven – USA/UK, supercharged, 252 hp (188 kW; 255 PS)
- Tatuus FT40/FT50 - Italy, N/A, 160 kW (218 PS; 215 hp) - Toyota Racing Series (Now Formula Regional Oceania)

== 3ZZ ==
=== 3ZZ-FE ===
The 3ZZ-FE is a 1.6 L (1,598 cc) version built in Japan, used in several Toyota models sold in Asian countries such as Singapore, Malaysia, Philippines, Thailand, Pakistan, Taiwan and China, Sri Lanka, parts of Europe and the Middle East, Brazil and South Africa from 2000 to 2012. Bore and stroke is 79 mm × 81.5 mm (3.11 in × 3.21 in), output is 109 hp (81 kW; 111 PS) at 6,000 rpm, and torque is 150 N⋅m (111 lb⋅ft) at 4,400 rpm. It features SMP pistons, which are also used on the 1ZZ-FE. The preferred engine oil is 5W-30 API grade SL/SM.

Applications:

- Toyota Corolla (E110); facelift (Europe, Middle East, Oceania)
- Toyota Corolla (E120) (Europe)
- Toyota Corolla Altis (E120/E140) (Asia)
- Toyota Corolla SE Saloon (E120) (Pakistan)
- Toyota Corolla EX (E120) (China; until the late 2000s)
- Toyota Corolla XLi (E120) (Brazil)
- Toyota Corolla 160 and RunX 160 (South Africa)
- Toyota Corolla Verso
- Toyota Avensis (T220); facelift (Europe)
- Toyota Avensis (T250) (Europe)

== 4ZZ ==
=== 4ZZ-FE ===
The 4ZZ-FE is a 1,398 cc (1.4 L; 85.3 cu in) version. Bore and stroke is 79 mm × 71.3 mm (3.11 in × 2.81 in). Output is 97 hp (72 kW; 98 PS) at 6000 rpm with 130 N⋅m (96 lb⋅ft) of torque at 4400 rpm.

Applications:

- Toyota Corolla (E110) (2000 facelift)
- Toyota Corolla (E120)
- Toyota Corolla (E140)
- Toyota Auris

== See also ==
- List of Toyota engines
