= Aurica Motors =

Former automotive company

Aurica Motors, LLC
- Company type: Private
- Industry: Automotive
- Founded: 2010
- Headquarters: Santa Clara, California, USA
- Key people: Greg Bender (Founder, Physicist); Matt Pitagora (Co-founder, General Manager)
- Products: Recurve Drive System
- Number of employees: 8
- Website: auricamotors.com

Aurica Motors, LLC was a start-up based out of Santa Clara, California that develops a proprietary electronic power train called the Aurica Recurve for electric cars. Aurica Motors is an offshoot of Aurica Labs, a research and development company started and funded by physicist Greg Bender.

On March 10, 2010, Aurica Motors was thrust into the public spotlight with the announcement of its intentions to save the New United Motor Manufacturing, Inc. (NUMMI) automotive plant in Fremont, California from completely shutting down.

The NUMMI plant, a joint venture between Toyota and General Motors, opened in 1984 as an experiment to determine if unionized Americans could adapt Japanese production management practices. The plant rolled out its last vehicle on April 1, 2010, forcing 4,700 factory workers out and likely affecting thousands of part suppliers.

In the same March announcement, Aurica also stated its intention to work with the NUMMI workforce to retrain it for electric car development and find financial backing to retool the plant.

On May 20, 2010, both Tesla Motors and Toyota announced a joint effort to manufacture Tesla's electric vehicles at the former NUMMI plant. Under the agreement, Toyota bought $50 million of common stock from Tesla Motors. Tesla then purchased a portion of the NUMMI property including the plant, with the goal of retrofitting the plant for its future “smaller third-generation car,” putting an end to Aurica's bid for the NUMMI plant.

== History and financing ==
Aurica Motors was registered as a limited liability company in California on March 15, 2010. Five days earlier, the start-up publicly announced its long-term desire to save the NUMMI factory and thousands of plant and supplier jobs. “We want to keep the plant open, and we believe we have a very viable plan to do so by manufacturing electric cars,” said Matt Pitagora, general manager of Aurica. “It's all about keeping the lights on.”

Aurica said that it would finance the endeavor with an aggressive campaign to garner Federal economic stimulus funding and find investors. The company estimated that it would need nearly $1 billion in combined financing to retrain workers and get the factory up and running. Aurica claimed to have begun negotiating with NUMMI in early 2010 to discuss the plant's future but a plant spokesman said on March 10 that “there has not been an opportunity for productive discussions with Aurica.”

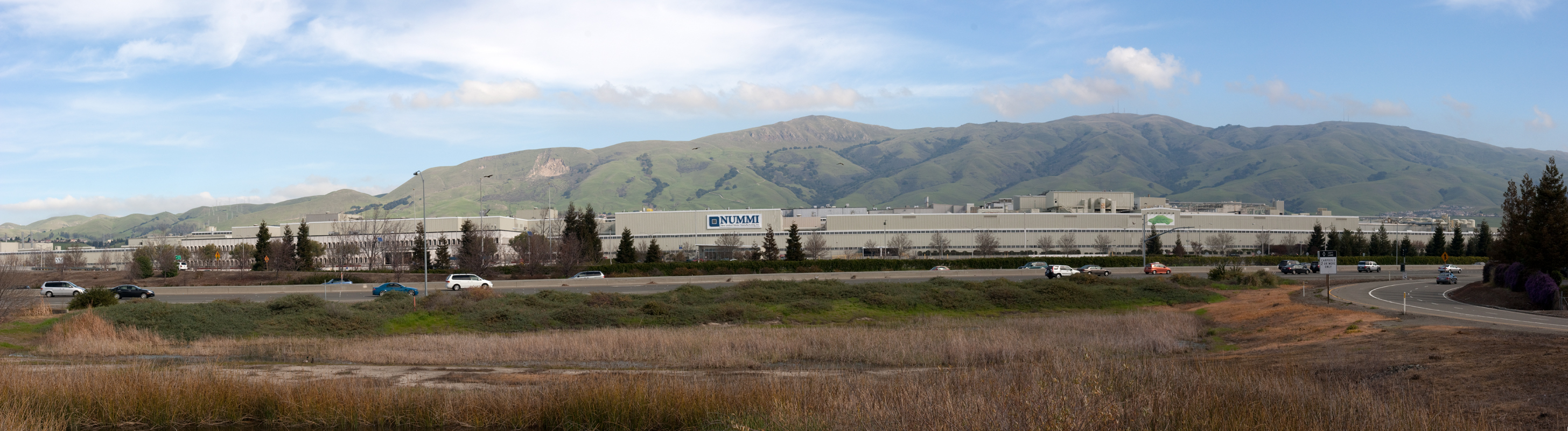
The NUMMI plant in Fremont, California.

Pitagora has so far refused to release details to the public on to current investors and amount of financing already obtained.

On March 30, 2010, Aurica released a press release stating that it had gained two new partnerships to further their goals. The company announced that it partnered with the Clean Tech Institute (CTI) of San Jose, California to develop training curriculum on electric auto manufacturing with the intent of offering it to NUMMI plant staff. CTI released further details on its Web site indicating that it would offer two different intensive programs to NUMMI staff: a photovoltaic specialist course and a more entry-level electrical systems course.

Aurica also announced a partnership with Motive Industries, a specialized vehicle manufacturer based in Calgary, Canada. Motive has already supplied a series of concept car designs to Aurica for public display.

With the May 20, 2010 announcement of the purchase of the NUMMI plant by Tesla Motors, Aurica's bid to purchase the factory ended. However Aurica stated on its website that it would still attempt to work with former NUMMI employees to retrain them for “work manufacturing Aurica electric cars in the Silicon Valley.” The startup hasn't made it clear if it has alternative manufacturing sites in its future plans.

== Technology and products ==
Aurica's base technology appears to be its Recurve Drive System, an “extended range, variable speed motor controller” that attaches to four independent electric motors connected to the wheels. The company states that the primary benefit is that “power doesn’t have to be transferred mechanically” to the wheels with such a system.

Aurica hopes to implement its Recurve Drive System into what it's calling the Aurica E-Car. The E-Car would have a standardized frame and drive system that would allow multiple body types to be fit on the chassis, even allowing for customized car and light truck bodies.

According to Aurica, each car would be run by its Power Exchange Package (PEP), an optimized, swappable and rechargeable battery pack that, when combined with its proprietary drive technology, would last up to twice as long as it would on its own. The battery could be recharged at home or swapped out at a special Aurica recharging station “in three minutes or less.” Aurica touts that its recharging stations would be powered with green energy.

The company also states that the car would optimally have regenerative braking, true radial steering, and an all-wheel drive system. No prototypes have been built, though auto designs have been posted by the company.

== Criticism ==
Since Aurica's announcement to save the NUMMI plant and the jobs associated with it, some critics have questioned the viability of the plan.

Edward Niedermeyer, journalist and editor-in-chief of The Truth About Cars, doubted Aurica's business plan, saying: “The idea that NUMMI’s 500k unit capacity could be used to build EVs 'within two years' as Aurica’s reps suggest, is laughable …especially considering that the $40k+ EV market already has a healthy number of contenders.” Despite this criticism, regardless of the unit volume capacity of the NUMMI facility, the May 20, 2010 purchase of the plant by Tesla Motors indicates that electric cars will be built there, albeit by Toyota and Tesla rather than Aurica Motors.

In an interview with the Oakland Tribune, NUMMI spokesman Lance Tomasu indicated that through the limited negotiations conducted with Aurica, he is “not sure whether their proposal is viable” enough to come up with the more than half billion dollars it would take to retrofit the plant.

John O’Dell of Green Car Advisor questioned how Aurica would be able to afford to run the 5,300,000 square feet (490,000 m^{2}) NUMMI plant, estimating nearly $50 million a year in electricity costs alone. O’Dell also referenced a review of the plant by Tesla Motors, indicating that Tesla turned down an offer to utilize it because it was “about 10 times the size of a facility Tesla would need” to manufacture its cars. Despite this comment, Tesla Motors went on to buy the NUMMI plant in a joint venture with Toyota on May 20, 2010. Ricardo Reyes, a spokesman for Tesla, indicated to the New York Times that the plant's ability to manufacture “500,000 cars a year” made it attractive “as an investment in the future.”
