= Geo Prizm =

Compact car sold under the Geo brand

Geo/Chevrolet Prizm
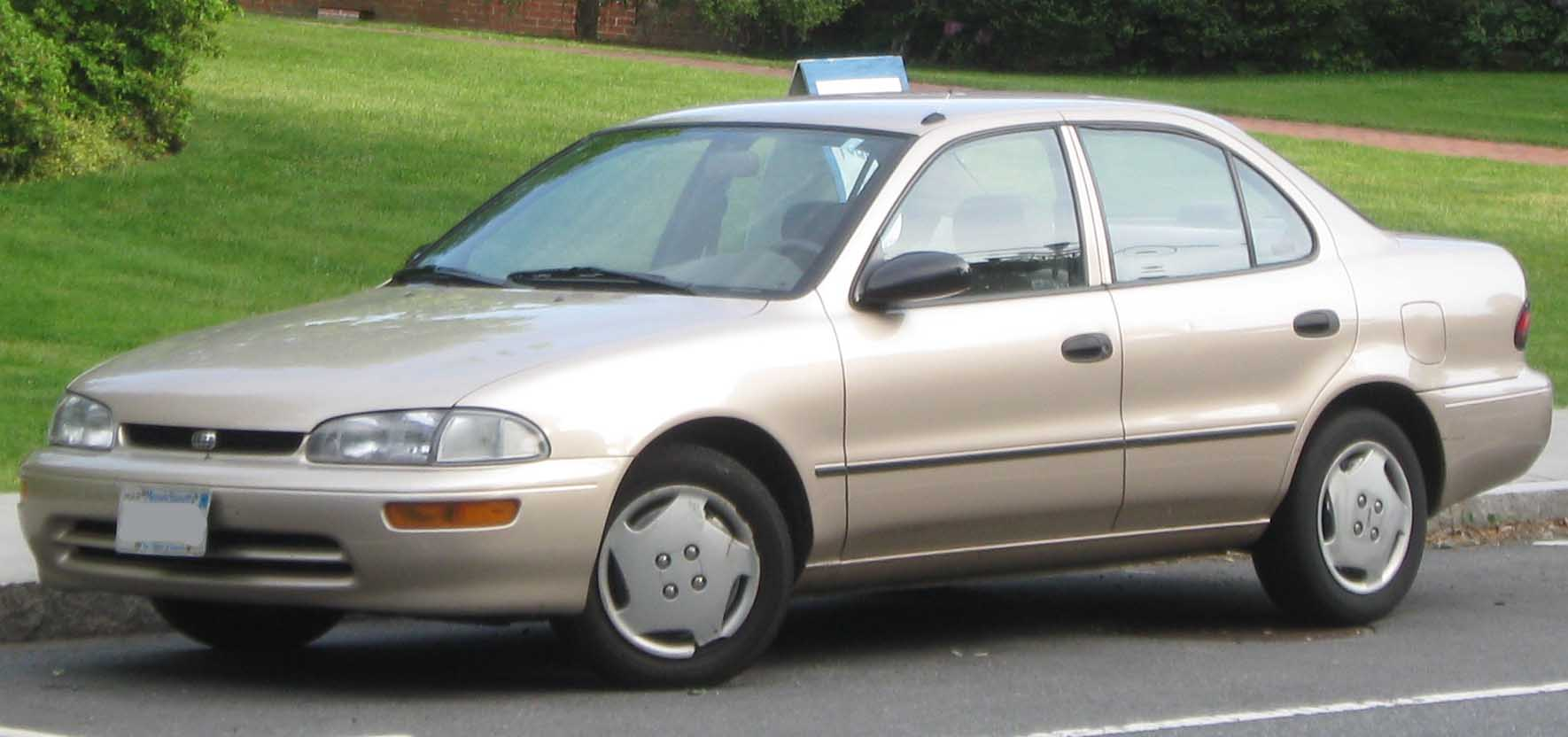
- 1993–1997 Geo Prizm 1.6 base (AE101)

Overview
- Manufacturer: New United Motor Manufacturing, Inc.
- Also called: Geo Prizm (1990–1997); Chevrolet Prizm (1998–2002)
- Production: 1988–2001
- Model years: 1989–2002
- Assembly: United States: Fremont, California (NUMMI)

Body and chassis
- Class: Subcompact car (1989–1992); Compact car (1993–2002)
- Layout: Transverse front-engine, front-wheel drive
- Platform: Toyota E90, E100, E110 platforms (known within GM as the S platform)

Chronology
- Predecessor: Chevrolet Nova
- Successor: Pontiac Vibe; Chevrolet Cobalt

The Geo Prizm, later called the Chevrolet Prizm, were compact cars that were rebadged versions of the Toyota Sprinter, a vehicle that the Japanese automaker Toyota never directly sold in the North American market. The Sprinter itself was derived from the Toyota Corolla. The Prizm was marketed under the Geo nameplate until it was discontinued after the 1997 model year. After that, the vehicle was marketed under the Chevrolet nameplate. General Motors (GM) referred to this and other Toyota Corolla-derived vehicles as the GM S platform. The cars were produced from 1988 to 2001 (the last ones being sold for model year 2002) alongside the Corolla at NUMMI, an assembly plant operated as a joint venture of GM and Toyota. The Prizm was sold exclusively in the United States and succeeded the 1985–1988 Chevrolet Nova, which was also derived from the Sprinter and produced at NUMMI.

== Production ==
All Prizms were built at NUMMI (New United Motor Manufacturing, Inc.), a joint venture company between Toyota and General Motors in Fremont, California. The NUMMI plant at Fremont had manufactured the Prizm's predecessor, the Chevrolet Nova, and would later manufacture the Pontiac Vibe, one of its replacements.

Production of the newly rebadged Chevrolet Prizm began in late 1997 as the Geo brand was phased out, alongside the newest North American generation of the Toyota Corolla. The last Prizm was built on December 13, 2001, resulting in a brief 2002 model year.

== First generation (E90) ==
First generation (E90)
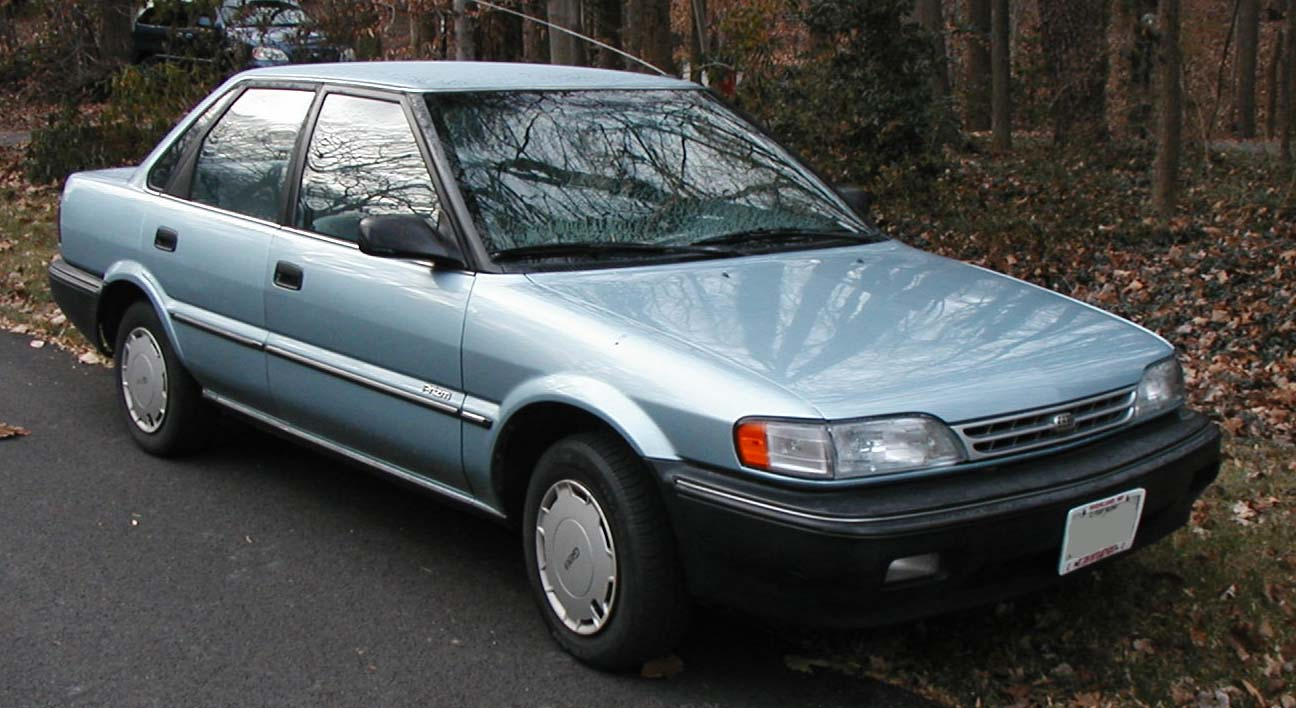
- Geo Prizm 1.6 base Sedan (AE92)

Overview
- Also called: Toyota Sprinter
- Production: 1989–1992
- Model years: 1990–1992
- Designer: Hiroshi Kawahara (1985)

Body and chassis
- Body style: 4-door sedan; 5-door hatchback
- Related: Toyota Corolla (E90); Toyota Sprinter

Powertrain
- Engine: 1.6 L 4A-FE (L01) DOHC I4; 1.6 L 4A-GE (LW0) DOHC I4
- Transmission: 5-speed manual; 3/4-speed automatic

Dimensions
- Wheelbase: 95.7 in (2,431 mm)
- Length: 170.7 in (4,336 mm)
- Width: 65.2 in (1,656 mm)
- Height: 52.4 in (1,331 mm)

The Prizm was introduced in February 1989 for GM's then-new Geo brand of import cars, for the 1990 model year. The hatchback version sold through 1991 was a rebadged version of the Toyota Sprinter Cielo, although unlike the Sprinter (and Corolla liftback) it received the same front clip as the sedan. The sporty GSi model of 1990–1992 was notable for its 130 hp (97 kW) twin-cam engine, sport suspension, disc brakes, and 14-inch wheels, which made it as a spiritual successor to the 1988 Chevrolet Nova twin-cam but less of a limited edition, available in both body styles and a full array of colors compared to the earlier model's black-only color and sedan-only body style. They were the only four-door models offered with the 4A-GE engine in America; no other Toyota models ever offered that combination there. The regular engine offered 102 hp (76 kW). In addition to the base and the GSi, there was also a better-equipped standard-engine LSi model. In addition to more equipment, the LSi also received body colored bumpers.

In 1991, the lettering of the car's name was changed, and the B-pillar and door frames on base models were body-colored instead of black. The hatchback body style was dropped.

The Prizm was not sold in Canada, with GM offering a sedan version of the Geo Metro instead. The Geo Metro sedan was not available from Chevrolet dealers in the United States until 1995, although a Suzuki Swift-branded version was on sale from 1990.

Design patents were filed by the Toyota Motor Corporation on December 6, 1985, using a final design 1:1 representation, under application number 1985-051078 and registered on July 13, 1988, under registration number 0718088-005.

=== Trims and options ===
- Sedan:
  - base • 1990–1992
  - GSi • 1990–1992
  - LSi • 1990–1992
- Liftback:
  - base • 1990–1991
  - GSi • 1990–1991
  - LSi • 1990–1991
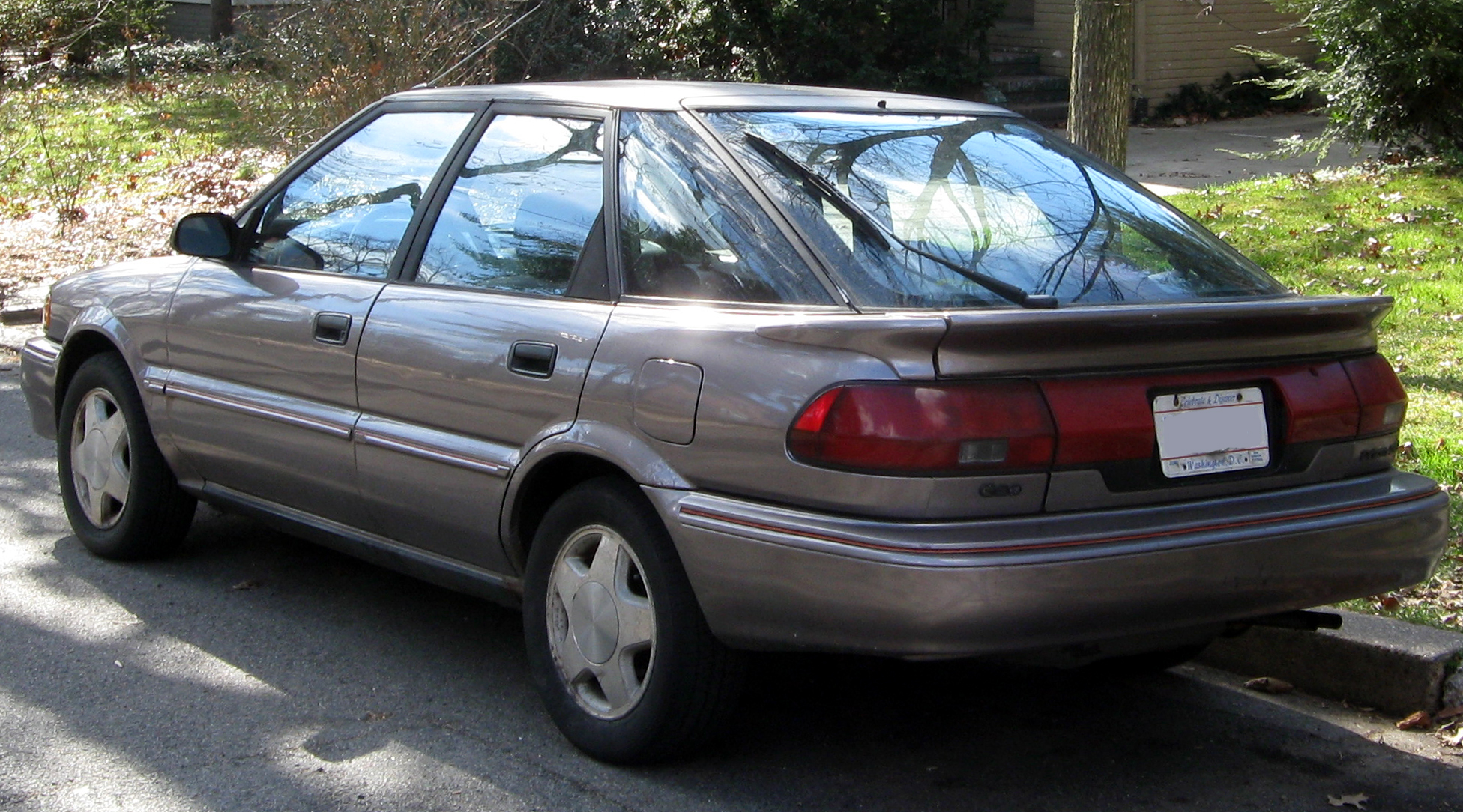
Geo Prizm GSi Liftback (AE92)

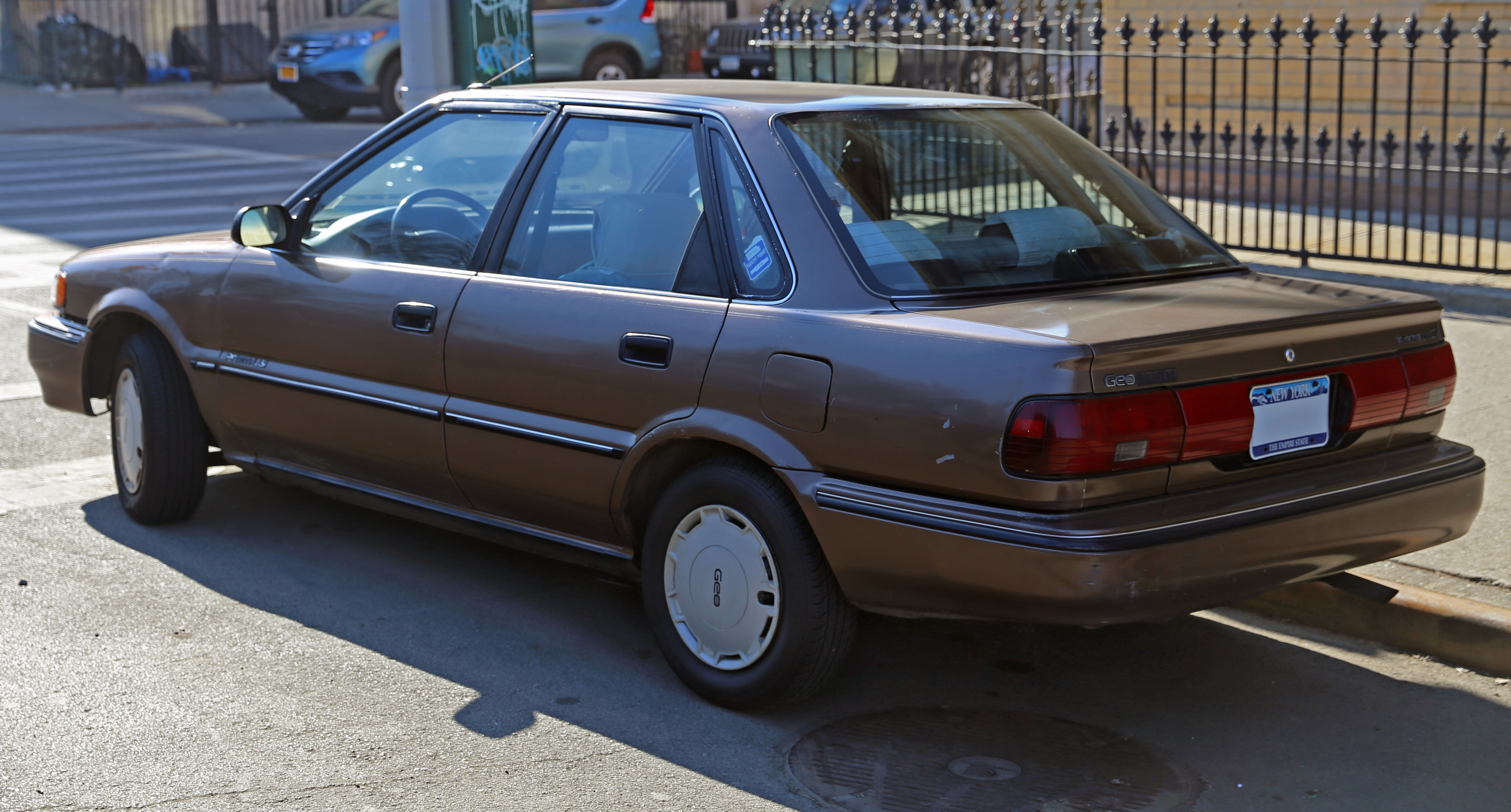
1990 Geo Prizm LSi Sedan (AE92)

== Second generation (E100) ==
Second generation (E100)
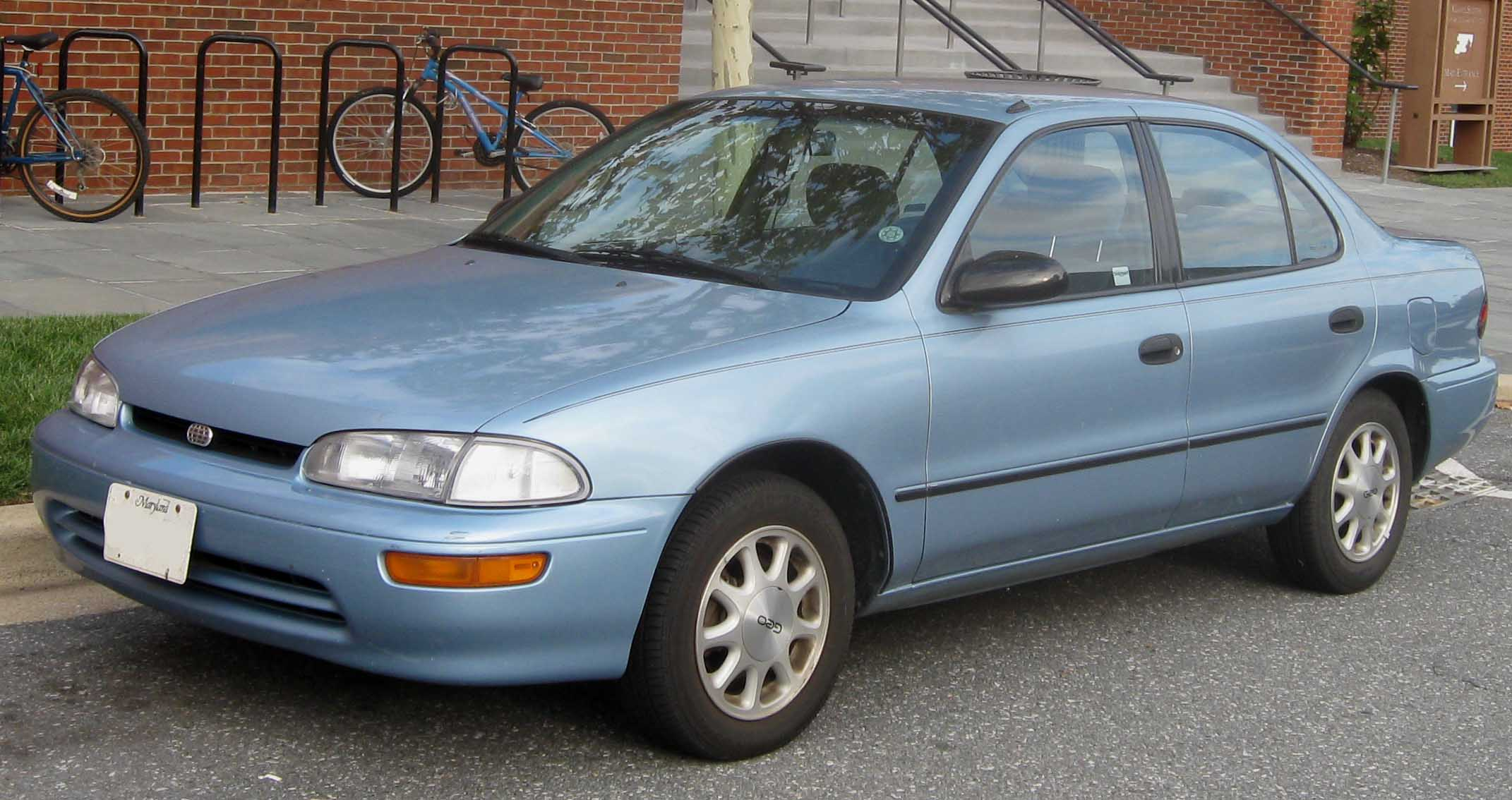
- Geo Prizm 1.8 LSi (AE102)

Overview
- Also called: Toyota Sprinter
- Production: 1992–1997
- Model years: 1993–1997

Body and chassis
- Body style: 4-door sedan
- Related: Toyota Corolla (E100); Toyota Sprinter

Powertrain
- Engine: 1.6 L 4A-FE (L01) I4; 1.8 L 7A-FE (LV6) I4
- Transmission: 5-speed C50 manual; 3-speed automatic; 4-speed automatic

Dimensions
- Wheelbase: 97.0 in (2,464 mm)
- Length: 173.0 in (4,394 mm)
- Width: 66.3 in (1,684 mm)
- Height: 53.3 in (1,354 mm)

The Prizm's second generation, and the last under the Geo brand name, debuted in 1992 for the 1993 model year. The Prizm gained more room (resulting in an upgrade to United States Environmental Protection Agency "compact" car status), a driver's-side airbag, and a new 1.8-liter four-cylinder engine, optional on LSi trim. With the larger engine came a rear stabilizer bar, wider tires, and an optional automatic transmission with four speeds instead of three. A second airbag became standard in 1993 for the 1994 model year; leather seats were an option on the LSi of this generation. In contrast with the Sprinters sold in Japan, this generation Prizm lacked a front stabilizer bar in its suspension.

U.S. Electricar used the Prizm as the basis for an electric vehicle conversion that replaced the gasoline drivetrain with an electric traction motor and high-voltage lead-acid storage battery. It was marketed in 1994.

=== Trims and options ===
- Sedan:
  - base • 1993–1997
  - LSi • 1993–1997

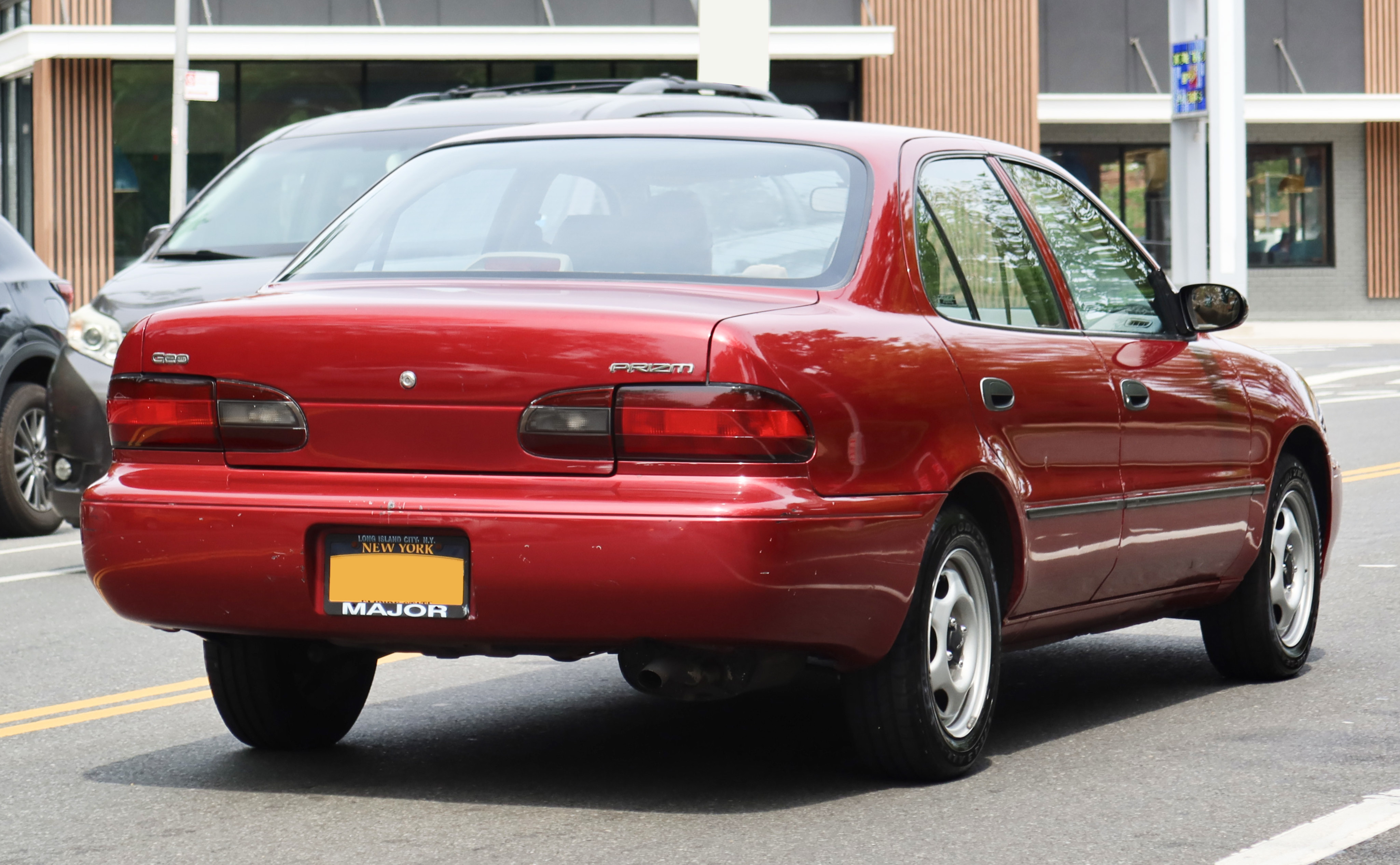
1996 Geo Prizm 1.6 base (AE101)

== Third generation (E110) ==
Third generation (E110)
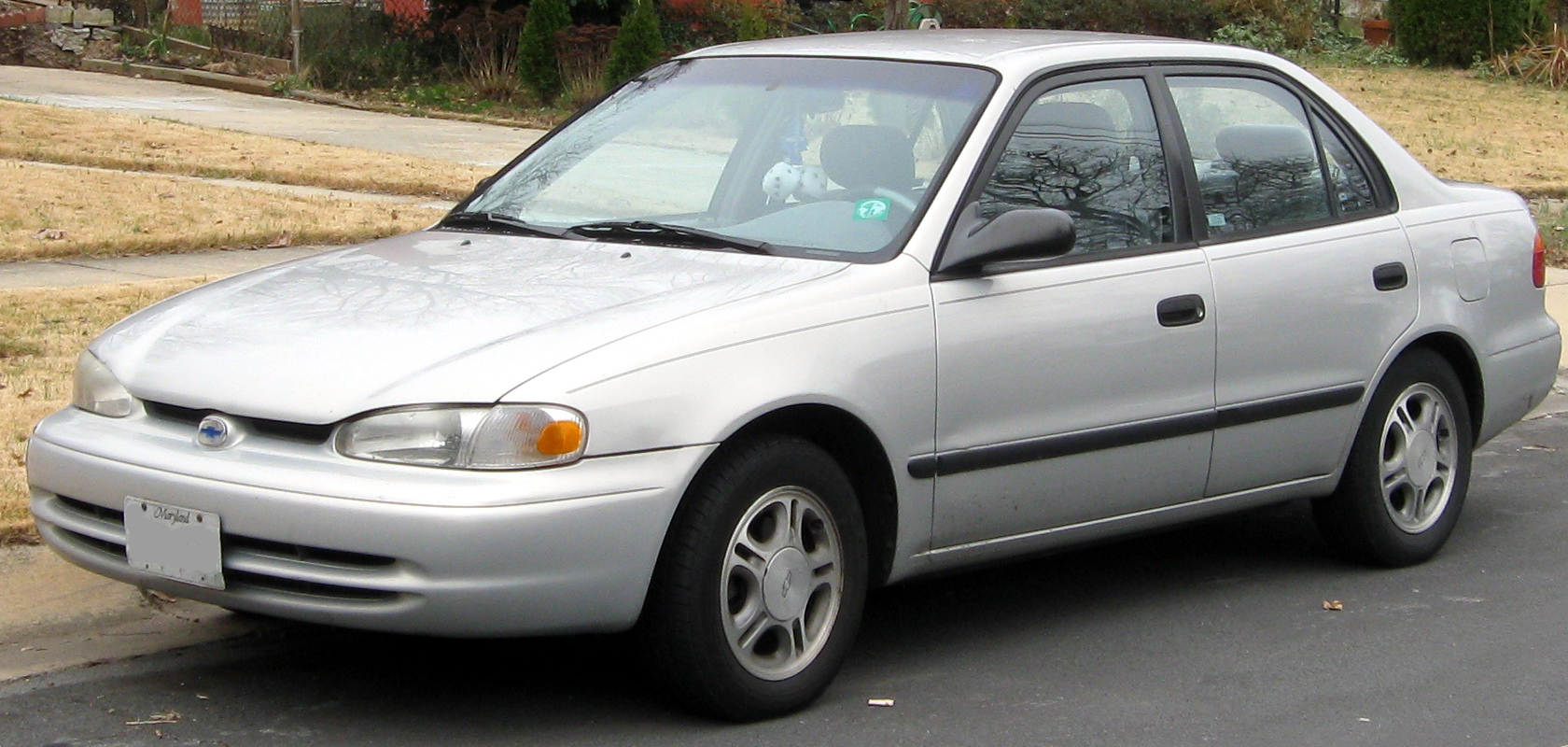
- Chevrolet Prizm LSi (ZZE110)

Overview
- Also called: Chevrolet Prizm; Toyota Corolla
- Production: 1997–2001
- Model years: 1998–2002

Body and chassis
- Body style: 4-door sedan
- Related: Toyota Corolla (E110); Toyota Sprinter

Powertrain
- Engine: 1.8 L 1ZZ-FE (LV6) I4 (gasoline)
- Transmission: 5-speed C59 manual; 3-speed MX1 automatic; 4-speed MS7 automatic

Dimensions
- Wheelbase: 97.1 in (2,466 mm)
- Length: 174.2 in (4,425 mm)
- Width: 66.7 in (1,694 mm)
- Height: 53.7 in (1,364 mm)

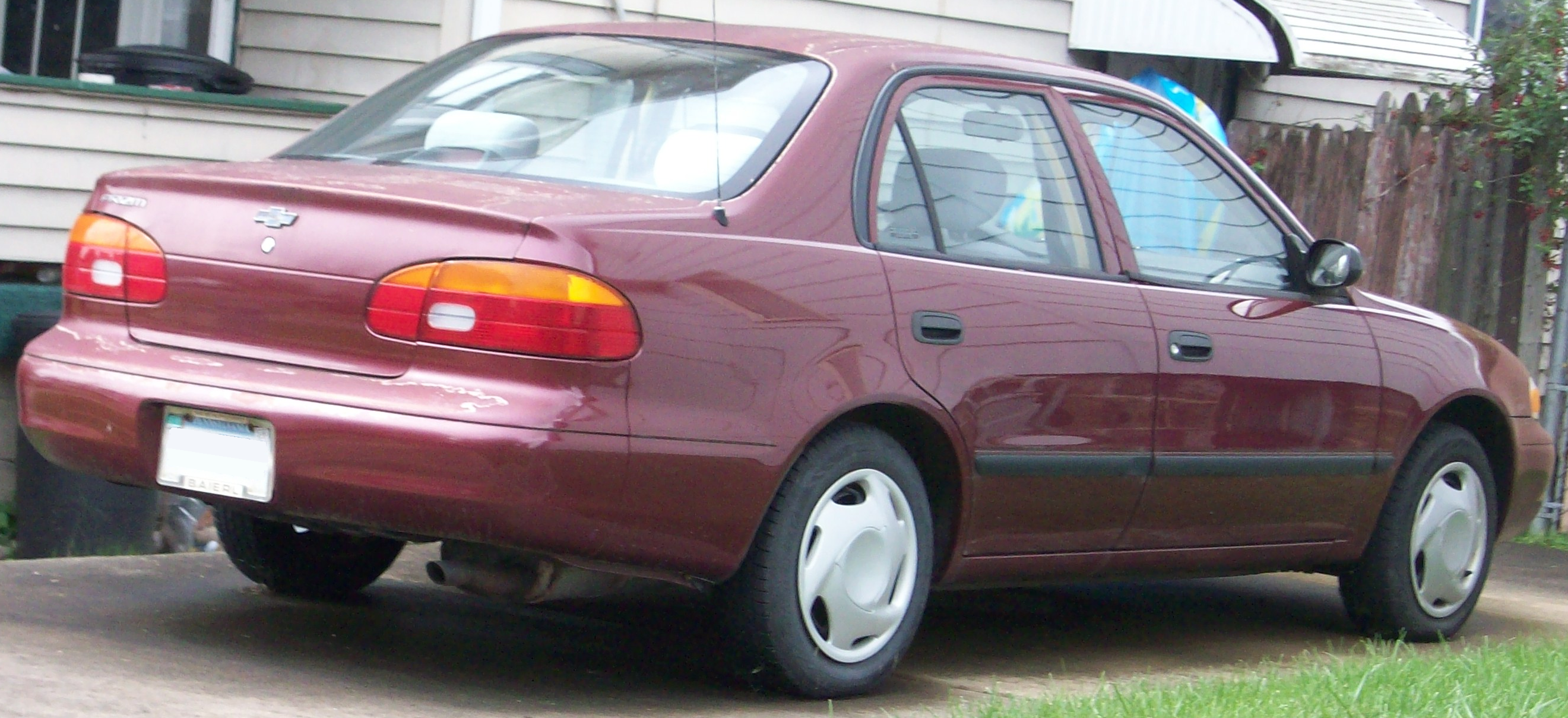
Rear view of Chevrolet Prizm base model (ZZE110)

The Prizm's 1998 redesign coincided with the conversion of all remaining Geo models into Chevrolets, as General Motors made the decision to discontinue the Geo brand entirely after 1997.

The most notable change was an all-new 1.8-liter engine known as the 1ZZ-FE, which powered all Corollas and Prizms, making this generation lighter than its predecessor. It is all-aluminum, driven by a timing chain (instead of a timing belt), and makes more power (with the same fuel economy) than the A-series engines from the Geo era. This new engine incorporated laser-etched valve guides directly in the cylinder head, rather than the old shrink-to-fit valve guides in the preceding Corolla motors (4A-FE & 7A-FE). This prevents oil burning and valve guide failure in the future. Although these efforts theoretically would have decreased oil burn, a flawed piston ring design affected all engines without VVT-i. This new engine design, although decreasing oil consumption from some components ultimately caused oil burning in higher mileage examples.

The Prizm, alongside the Corolla, became the first car in the compact class to offer optional side airbags. All 1998 Prizms without the LSi's optional handling package (containing a front stabilizer bar) were singled out by Consumer Reports for having sloppy emergency handling; Toyota addressed the problem for 1999 by making the handling package standard. For 2000, the engine gained variable valve timing (VVT-i) for a slight increase in power from 120 to 125 hp (89 to 93 kW). The then-recently introduced VVT-i optimizes cam and valve timing to reduce emissions, and the addition of individual coils for each cylinder helped control spark timing to each individual cylinder.

Due to decreased sales, low popularity, and competing with the Chevrolet Cavalier and GM's more direct competitor to the Corolla, the Saturn S-series, the Prizm was replaced by the Pontiac Vibe starting in 2003. The Vibe was also made in tandem with a Toyota model, the Toyota Matrix, at the NUMMI plant.

The Prizm, along with its Geo siblings, suffered severe sales loss when the brand denomination changed from Geo to Chevrolet in 1998. The Geo models outsold the rebadged Chevrolets three to one.

=== Trims and options ===
- Sedan:
  - base • 1998–2002
  - LSi • 1998–2002

== Comparison to Toyota Corolla ==
In all three generations, the Prizm was virtually the same car as the Toyota Corolla. It has more similarities with other Toyotas during the time period it was produced than it does to other cars from Geo and Chevrolet. The first and second generation Prizms shared body shells with the Japanese market Toyota Sprinter, the former featuring additional quarter windows in the C-pillars and the latter different doors and door apertures that wrapped upward into the roof; the third generation used the same body as the E110 Corolla sedan.

Its distinctions from the Corolla came down to minor cosmetic differences, a GM Delco radio after 1992, the non-availability of a wagon in all three generations, and the availability of a hatchback for the 1989–1991 model years (the Corolla was not offered as a hatchback in North America during those years).

The third-generation Prizm also featured a Delphi air conditioning system instead of the Corolla's Denso air conditioning system. The Prizms also used the contemporary Sprinter front end to differentiate them from their Corolla counterparts. The third-generation Prizm headlight, front turn signal, and taillight assemblies were also different, making them notable exceptions in a car that shared almost all of its parts with the Toyota Corolla through each of its model years.

== Engines ==
All Prizms are powered by engines from their contemporary Toyota Corolla models:

- 1990–1992 Geo Prizms are powered by a 4A-FE or optional 4A-GE engine
- 1993–1997 Geo Prizms are powered by a 4A-FE or optional 7A-FE engine
- 1998–2002 Chevrolet Prizms are powered by a 1ZZ-FE engine, with 2000–2002 models including VVT-i

== See also ==
- Chevrolet Chevy II / Nova
- Toyota Corolla (E90)
- Toyota Corolla (E100)
- Toyota Corolla (E110)
- NUMMI
- Pontiac Vibe

== Bibliography ==
- Geo Prizm Sales Brochure (1990–1997) by Geo
- Chevrolet Prizm Sales Brochure (1998–2002) by Chevrolet
- 1989 New Car Buying Guide (1989) by Guy Henle & Consumer Reports
- 1990 New Car Buying Guide (1990) by Consumer Reports
- 1993 New Car Buying Guide (1993–1997) by Bill Hartford & Consumer Reports
- 1998 New Car Buying Guide (1998–2002) by Consumer Reports
- Consumer Reports Used Car Buying Guide (1997–2002) by Consumer Reports
