= NUMMI =

Former American automaker based in Fremont, California

Coordinates: 37°29′41″N 121°56′41″W

New United Motor Manufacturing, Inc. (NUMMI)

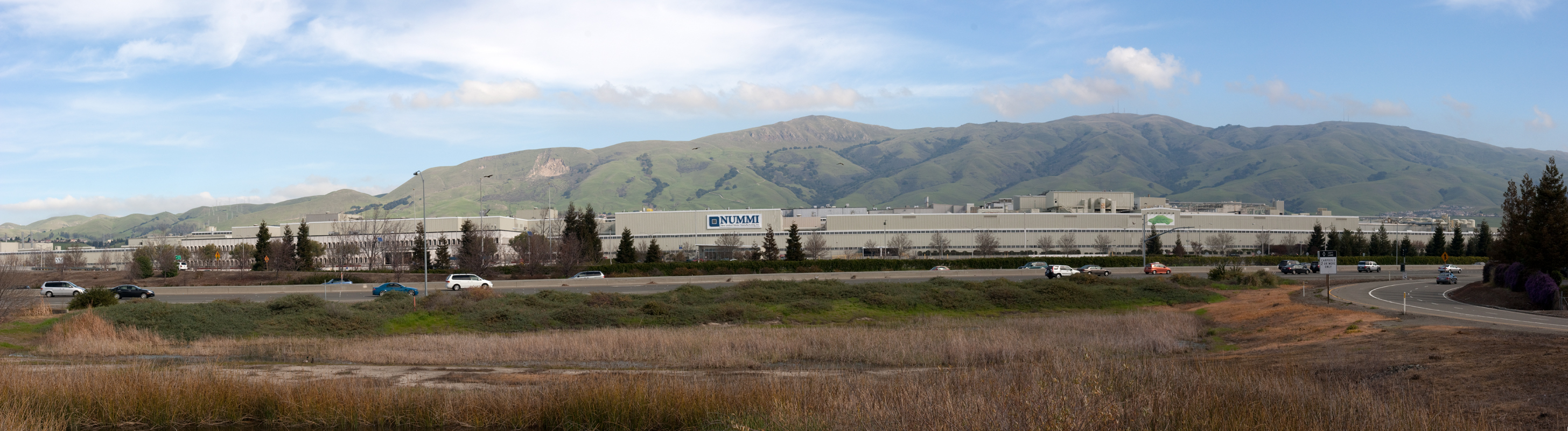
- Company type: Joint venture
- Industry: Automotive
- Predecessor: GM Fremont Assembly (1960–1982)
- Founded: December 1984
- Defunct: April 1, 2010
- Fate: Dissolved
- Headquarters: Fremont, California, United States
- Products: Compact cars and trucks
- Production output: 428,633 vehicles (2006)
- Services: Automotive manufacturing
- Owner: General Motors and Toyota
- Number of employees: 5,500 (2006)
- Website: nummi.com (defunct)

New United Motor Manufacturing, Inc. (NUMMI) was an American automobile manufacturing company in Fremont, California, jointly owned by General Motors and Toyota, that opened in 1984 and closed in April 2010. The plant is located in the East Industrial area of Fremont next to the Mud Slough between Interstate 880 and Interstate 680. The plant's peak production year was 2006, when it manufactured 428,633 vehicles.

After the plant was closed by its owners, the facility was sold to Tesla and reopened in October 2010, becoming known as the Tesla Fremont Factory.

== History ==
=== Background ===
Before NUMMI, the site was the former Fremont Assembly that General Motors operated between 1962 and 1982. Employees at the Fremont plant were "considered the worst workforce in the automobile industry in the United States," according to a later recounting by a leader of the workers' own union, the United Auto Workers (UAW).

GM as a company was departmentalized (design, manufacturing) as per Henry Ford's division of labor, but without the necessary communication and collaboration between the departments. There was an adversarial relationship between workers and plant supervisors, with management not considering the employees' view on production, and quantity was preferred over quality. Like all American car plants, the production lines at Fremont seldom stopped, and when mistakes were made, cars continued down the line with the expectation that they would be fixed later. By the early 1980s, the adversarial relationship had deteriorated to the point where employees drank alcohol, smoked marijuana (at the time, an illegal activity), were frequently absent (enough so that the production line could not be started), and even committed petty acts of sabotage such as putting "Coke bottles inside the door panels, so they'd rattle and annoy the customer."

Attempts to discipline workers were often met with grievances or even strikes, putting the plant into near-continuous chaos. By 1982, GM had had enough and closed Fremont Assembly and laid off its thousands of workers.

=== Transforming Fremont Assembly into NUMMI ===
At about the same time, GM was struggling to profitably build high-quality and fuel-efficient small cars that consumers demanded after the energy crisis of the 1970s. Consumers started turning to foreign automakers for these vehicles, prompting the U.S. Congress to consider import restrictions to protect the domestic auto industry. That led GM and Toyota to team up and create New United Motor Manufacturing, Inc. (NUMMI), a joint venture to manufacture vehicles to be sold under both brands.

GM saw the joint venture as a way to get access to quality small cars and an opportunity to learn about the Toyota Production System and The Toyota Way, a series of lean manufacturing and management philosophies that had made the company a leader in the automotive manufacturing and production industry. For Toyota, the factory gave the company its first manufacturing base in North America allowing it to avoid tariffs on imported vehicles and saw GM as a partner that could show them how to navigate the American labor environment, particularly relations with the United Auto Workers union.

The companies made the unusual choice to remake the troubled Fremont Assembly into the new NUMMI plant. The leadership of the UAW union insisted on re-hiring the same union leadership that had overseen GM's worst workforce. GM was against it, but Toyota agreed, believing that their system could turn things around. However, Toyota insisted that the plant would need to operate differently and old seniority rules would not apply. The workers hated the proposed changes, but desperately needed jobs. Ultimately, over 85% of NUMMI's initial workforce were the workers laid off at Fremont Assembly in 1982. GM would also assign 16 managers to the plant and Toyota sent 30 managers and production coordinators from Japan, including the CEO, Tatsuro Toyoda, part of the company's founding family.

Ahead of the reopening of the plant, Toyota sent many of the workers to Toyota's Takaoka plant in Japan to learn the Toyota Production System and actually work for a few days on the assembly line. Workers who made the transition identified the emphasis on quality and teamwork by Toyota management as what motivated a change in work ethic. Among the cultural changes were the same uniform, parking and cafeterias for all levels of employment in order to promote a team concept, and a no-layoff policy. Built-in process quality and employee suggestion programs for continual improvement were other changes. Consensus decision-making reached management level, in contrast with the old departmentalization.

By December 1984 (two years after the closure of Fremont Assembly), NUMMI's first car, a yellow Chevrolet Nova, rolled off the assembly line. The plant started producing the Toyota Corolla in September 1986. Almost right away, the NUMMI factory was producing cars at the same speed as the Japanese factories and Corollas produced at NUMMI were judged to be equal in quality to those produced in Japan with a similar number of defects per 100 vehicles.

In 1990, for the 1991 model year, Toyota started building the Toyota Hilux (also known as the Toyota Pickup) at NUMMI, allowing the company to completely avoid the chicken tax, a 25 percent tariff on light trucks imposed in 1964. Previously, the company had avoided a large portion of the tariff by importing the truck as an incomplete chassis cab (which included the entire truck, less the truck bed) which only faced a 4% tariff. Once in the United States, Toyota Auto Body California (TABC) would produce the truck beds and attach them to the trucks. TABC was the first manufacturing investment in the U.S. for Toyota. This tariff loophole was closed in 1980.

NUMMI did face some financial challenges, with cars costing more to build than at other GM plants and only operating at 58.6% capacity by 1988. The plant had not reached break-even by 1991.

In January 1995, NUMMI began producing the Toyota Tacoma, a pickup truck designed exclusively for the North American market.

Up to May 2010, NUMMI built an average of 6,000 vehicles a week, or nearly eight million cars and trucks since opening in 1984. In 1997, NUMMI produced 357,809 cars and trucks. Production reached its annual peak of 428,633 units in 2006.

=== The end of the joint venture ===
Toyota took the lessons it learned from NUMMI and went on to establish the wholly owned Toyota Motor Manufacturing USA (later renamed Toyota Motor Manufacturing Kentucky) and Toyota Motor Manufacturing Canada plants in 1986, and by 2009 the company was operating a dozen manufacturing facilities in North America. However, NUMMI remained Toyota's only unionized plant in the United States.

GM executives, particularly CEO John F. Smith Jr., attempted to spread the Toyota Production System to other assembly plants, but it proved largely unsuccessful. Despite having a front row seat to learn about the production system, by 1998 (15 years later) GM had still not been able to implement lean manufacturing in the rest of the United States, though GM managers trained at NUMMI were successful in introducing the approach to its unionized factories in Brazil.

By 2009, GM was in serious financial trouble and filed for Chapter 11 bankruptcy reorganization. In April the company confirmed its commitment to NUMMI and in June announced that it was scrapping the Pontiac brand which would end production of the Corolla-derived Pontiac Vibe at NUMMI by August 2009. That triggered several months of discussions between the automakers, trying to find products that could be produced at the factory for both companies, with Toyota even offering to build a version of its Prius hybrid for GM at the factory.

Fremont Mayor Bob Wasserman, city officials and California Governor Arnold Schwarzenegger lobbied the automakers to find a product and keep NUMMI open. State officials crafted sales tax exemption on new factory equipment to preserve NUMMI. A regional committee was formed in February 2010 to investigate the closure of the plant, and the facility was appraised while operating.

The talks ultimately failed and in June 2009 the GM announced that it would pull out of NUMMI. On August 27, 2009, Toyota announced that it would also discontinue production at NUMMI by March 2010, marking the first time the company had ever closed a factory.

In a November 2009 call with autoworkers, Toyota's head of U.S. sales said that though it was a difficult decision to shut down the plant, "the economics of having a plant in California so far away from the supplier lines" in the Midwest "just doesn't make business sense" for Toyota. Autoworkers prepared for the shut down by refreshing skills and planning for career transitions. In March 2010, 90% of the workers at the plant approved a $281 million severance package from Toyota that had been negotiated by the UAW, averaging $54,000 to the plant's 4,700 employees.

Production of the Corolla in North America was shifted to Toyota Motor Manufacturing Canada until the new Toyota Motor Manufacturing Mississippi assembly plant could open in October 2011. Production of the Tacoma had already partially shifted to Toyota Motor Manufacturing de Baja California in 2004, and the remaining work shifted to Toyota Motor Manufacturing Texas.

At 9:40am on April 1, 2010, the plant produced its last car, a red Toyota Corolla. NUMMI sold off equipment at an auction, with robots and tooling going to Toyota's plants in Kentucky, Texas and Mississippi. NUMMI sold some equipment to Tesla for $15 million.

=== Reuse of the factory ===
Ahead of the closure of NUMMI, several possible uses for the facility were proposed.

In January 2010, the land was considered for a new stadium for the Oakland Athletics of Major League Baseball. It is close to the proposed site of Cisco Field, which was never formally approved. On March 10, 2010, Aurica Motors announced that it intended to raise investment capital and garner federal economic stimulus funds to help retrain the workers and retool the facility for production of electric vehicles. Both proposals went nowhere.

On May 20, 2010, Tesla Motors announced that it would purchase most (210 of 370 acres) of the former NUMMI site from Toyota for $42 million, significantly under market value. As part of the agreement, Toyota would also purchase $50 million of common stock when Tesla held its IPO the next month. In exchange, Tesla agreed to partner with Toyota on the "development of electric vehicles, parts, and production system and engineering support." The two companies would later end their partnership in 2017.

The plant, renamed the Tesla Fremont Factory, produces the Model S, Model X, Model 3, and Model Y vehicles. As of 2023, the plant employs 22,000 people, far greater than the 5,500 employees of NUMMI, and produced nearly 560,000 vehicles, 30 percent more than the maximum output of NUMMI.

== Models produced ==
During its time in operation, the NUMMI joint venture factory produced the following models (model years):

- Chevrolet Nova (1985–1988)
- Geo/Chevrolet Prizm (1989–2002)
- Pontiac Vibe/Toyota Matrix/Toyota Voltz (2003–2010)
- Toyota Corolla (1987–2010)
  - Toyota Corolla (E80) FX16 (1987)
  - Toyota Corolla (E90) (1988–1992)
  - Toyota Corolla (E100) (1993–1997)
  - Toyota Corolla (E110) (1998–2002)
  - Toyota Corolla (E130) (2002–2008)
  - Toyota Corolla (E140) (2008–2010)
- Toyota Hilux/Pickup (1992–1994)
- Toyota Tacoma (1995–2010)

== See also ==
- CAMI Automotive (CAMI) — A similar joint venture in Canada between Suzuki and General Motors from 1986 to 2009; now operating as a wholly owned GM plant.
- United Australian Automobile Industries (UAAI) — A similar joint venture in Australia between Toyota and GM-Holden from 1989 to 1996.
- Gung Ho — A 1986 comedy film portraying a similar joint venture and is used by Toyota executives in Japan as an example of how not to manage Americans.
