= List of Toyota model codes =

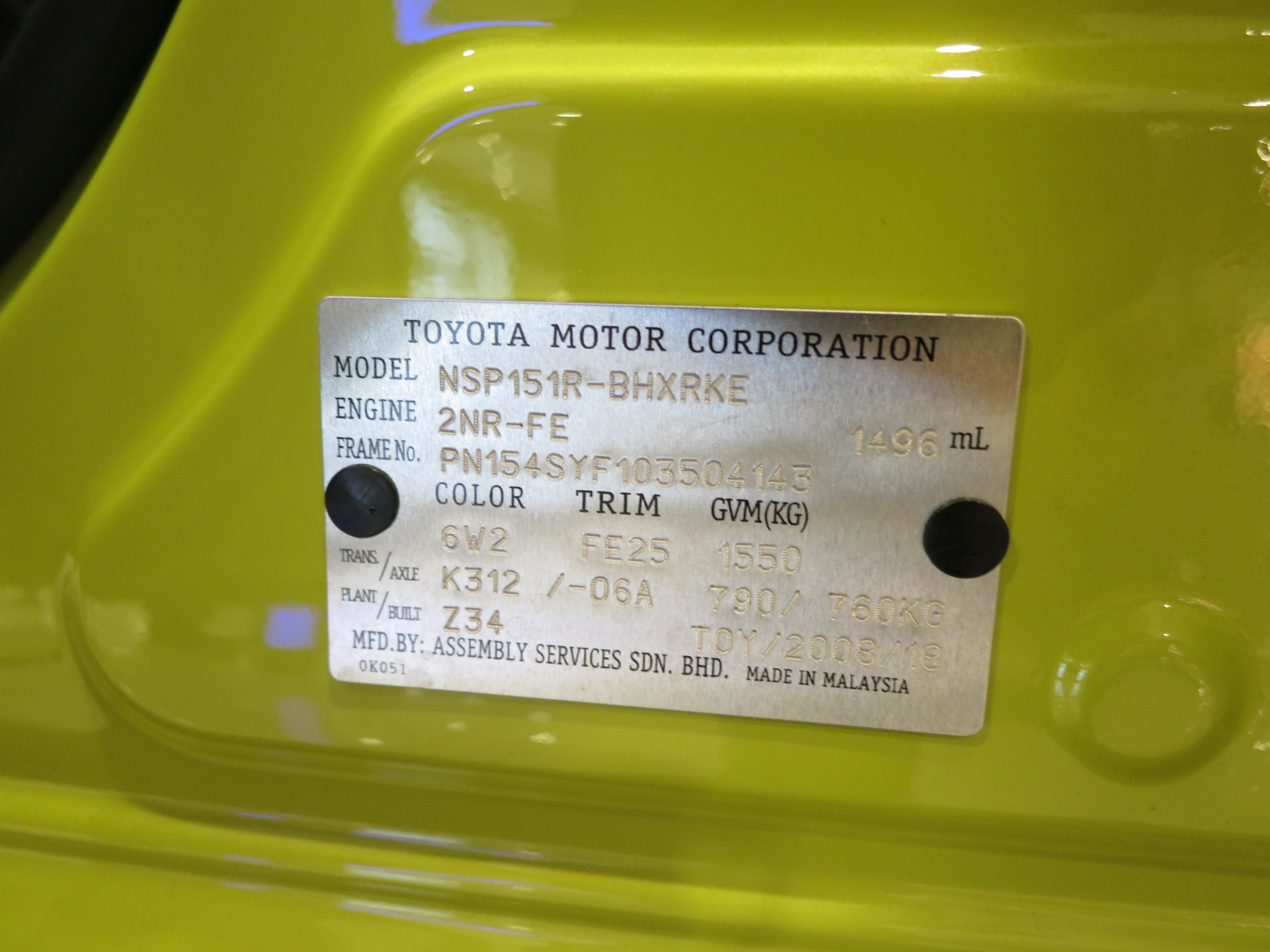
Model code of a Toyota Yaris (XP150) written on the VIN plate

The following model codes have been used by Toyota. The letters of the model code is found by combining the letters of the engine code with the platform code. If the engine code and the platform code have two letters each, the middle letter is computed according to this formula:

Drivetrain	2nd letter of engine code		1st letter of platform code		Computed middle letter of model code	Example
Diesel	D	+	A	→	U	Corolla Verso 1CD + AR10 → CUR10; Innova 2KD + AN40 → KUN45
Diesel	D	+	X	→	L	Yaris Verso 1ND + XP20 → NLP20
Petrol	R	+	A	→	G	Aygo 1KR + AB10 → KGB10; Etios 2NR + AK10 → NGK15
Petrol	R	+	X	→	S	Lexus IS 250 4GR + XE20 → GSE20; Sienna 2GR + XL30 → GSL30
Petrol	Z	+	A	→	N	Wish 1ZZ + AE10 → ZNE10
Petrol	Z	+	X	→	C	Camry 2AZ + XV30 → ACV30 Yaris / Vios 1NZ + XP150 → NCP150
Hybrid	R	+	none	→	W	Lexus GS 450h 2GR + S190 → GWS190 Corolla 2ZR + E210 → ZWE211
Hybrid	R	+	A	→	Y	Lexus RX 450h 2GR + AL10 → GYL10
Hybrid	R	+	X	→	V	Prius 2ZR + XW30 → ZVW30 Camry 2AR + XV50 → AVV50
Hybrid	Z	+	none	→	K	Corolla 1NZ + E160 → NKE160
Hybrid	Z	+	A	→	T	Alphard 2AZ + AH10 → ATH10
Hybrid	Z	+	X	→	H	Prius 1NZ + XW20 → NHW20

Vehicles with newer powertrains, including Dynamic Force engines and 1XM/1YM electric motors, use an updated model code system, as shown in the table below.

Drivetrain	First letter of engine/motor code	Platform code	Variable	Example
Petrol/diesel	A	XV	A	Camry AXVA70 = A25A-FKS + XV70
Petrol/diesel	M	AX	A	C-HR MAXA10 = M20A-FKS + AX10
Petrol/diesel	V	XF	A	Lexus LS500 VXFA50 = V35A-FTS + XF50
Petrol/diesel	F	J	A	Land Cruiser FJA300 = F33A-FTV + J300
Petrol/diesel	M	XP	B (Note: Second non-hybrid model of the platform)	Yaris Cross MXPB10 = M15A-FKS + XP210
Hybrid	A	XA	H	RAV4 AXAH50 = A25A-FXS + XA50
Hybrid	M	XP	J (Note: Second hybrid model of the platform)	Yaris Cross MXPJ10 = M15A-FXE + XP210
Hybrid	M	XP	K (Note: Third hybrid model of the platform)	Aqua MXPK10 = M15A-FXE + XP210
Electric	X	EB	M	Lexus RZ XEBM10 = 1XM + EB10
Electric	Y	EA	M	bZ4X YEAM15 = 1YM + EA10

== Platforms ==
=== A ===
Models

A10, A20, A30

- Toyota Carina (1970–1977, A10, A30)
- Toyota Celica (1970–1977, A20, A30)

A40, A50

- Toyota Carina (1977–1981)
- Toyota Celica (1978–1981)
- Toyota Celica Supra / Toyota Celica XX (1978–1981)
- Toyota Celica Camry (1980–1982)

A60

- Toyota Carina (1981–1984)
- Toyota Celica (1981–1985)
- Toyota Celica Supra / Toyota Celica XX (1982–1986)

A70

- Toyota Supra (1986–1992)

A80

- Toyota Supra (1993–2002)

A10

- Lexus CT (2011–2022, ZWA10)
Engines

RA Platform (8R, 16R, 18R, 19R, 20R, 21R, 22R engine)

- 1970.12–1981.02 Toyota Carina
- 1980.08–1982.02 Toyota Celica Camry
- 1970.12–1985.07 Toyota Celica

TA Platform (T, 2T, 3T, 4T, 12T, 13T engine)

- 1970.12–1983.09 Toyota Carina
- 1980.08–1982.02 Toyota Celica Camry
- 1970.12-1985 Toyota Celica

AA Platform (3A, 4A engine)

- 1982–1983 Toyota Carina
- 1982–1985 Toyota Celica

CA Platform (1C engine)

- Toyota Carina
- Toyota Celica

KA Platform (5K engine)

- Toyota Carina
- Toyota Celica

SA Platform (1S, 2S engine)

- Toyota Carina
- Toyota Celica

GA Platform (1G engine)

- 1979–1987.5 Toyota Supra

MA Platform (3M, 4M, 5M, 6M, 7M engine)

- 1978.04–1993.05 Toyota Supra

JZA Platform (1JZ, 2JZ engine)

- 1988.5-2002 Toyota Supra

=== B ===
Models
B10
- Toyota Coaster (1977–1982)

B20, B30

- Toyota Coaster (1982–1993)

B40, B50

- Toyota Coaster (1993–present)

B60, B70, B80

- Toyota Coaster (2017–present)

=== C ===
Models
C10
- Toyota Massy Dyna (1969–1975)

C20

- Toyota Massy Dyna Cargo (1975–1979)

=== D ===
Models
D10
- Toyota Blizzard (1980–1984)

D20

- Toyota Blizzard (1984–1990)

=== E ===
Models

E10

- Toyota Corolla (1966–1970)

E20

- Toyota Corolla / Toyota Sprinter (1970–1977)

E30, E40, E50, E60

- Toyota Corolla / Toyota Sprinter (1974–1979)

E70

- Toyota Corolla / Toyota Sprinter (1979–1987)

E80

- Toyota Corolla / Toyota Sprinter (1983–1987, E80, E81, E82)
- Toyota Corolla Levin / Toyota Sprinter Trueno (1983–1987, E85, E86)

E90

- Toyota Corolla / Toyota Sprinter (1987–1991, E90, E91, E92, E96, E98)
- Toyota Corolla Levin / Toyota Sprinter Trueno (1987–1991, E91, E92)

E100

- Toyota Corolla / Toyota Sprinter (1991–2002)
- Toyota Corolla Ceres / Toyota Sprinter Marino (1992–1998)

E110

- Toyota Corolla / Toyota Sprinter (1995–2000)
- Toyota Corolla Spacio (1997–2001)

E120

- Toyota Corolla / Toyota Allex (2000–2017)
- Toyota Corolla Spacio / Toyota Corolla Verso (2001–2007)
- WiLL VS (2001–2004)

E130

- Toyota Corolla (2002–2007, North American spec)
- Toyota Corolla Matrix / Toyota Matrix (2002–2008)
- Toyota Voltz (2002–2004)

E140

- Toyota Corolla (2006–2013, MC Platform)
- Toyota Matrix (2009–2014)

E150

- Toyota Corolla (2006–2013, New MC platform)
- Toyota Auris / Toyota Blade / Toyota Corolla (2006–2012)
- Scion xB / Toyota Corolla Rumion / Toyota Ruckus (2007–2015)

E160

- Toyota Corolla (2012–present, B platform)

E170, E180

- Toyota Corolla / Toyota Levin (2013–present, New MC platform)
- Toyota Auris / Toyota Corolla / Scion iM (2012–2018, E180)

E210

- Toyota Corolla / Toyota Levin / Toyota Allion (2018–present)
Engines

KE Platform (K, 2K, 3K, 4K, 5K engine)

- 1966.11–1983.05 Toyota Corolla
- 1966.11–1983.05 Toyota Sprinter

TE Platform (T, 2T, 3T engine)

- 1966.11–1983.05 Toyota Corolla
- 1966.11–1983.05 Toyota Sprinter

AE Platform (3A, 4A engine)

- 1982–2000 Toyota Corolla
- 1982–2000 Toyota Sprinter

CE Platform (1C, 2C engine)

- Toyota Corolla
- Toyota Sprinter

ZZE Platform (1ZZ, 2ZZ engine)

- Toyota Corolla
- Toyota Sprinter
- Toyota Matrix (2003–2008)

AZE Platform (2AZ engine)

- 2007–2015 Scion xB
- 2006–2015 Toyota Rukus /Corolla Rumion
- 2009–2013 Toyota Corolla XRS

NZE Platform (1NZ engine)

- 2008–present Toyota Corolla Rumion / Corolla Axio / Corolla Fielder
- 2007–2018 Toyota Auris

ZRE Platform (2ZR engine)

- 2009–present Toyota Corolla Rumion / Corolla Axio / Corolla Fielder
- 2008–2018 Toyota Auris

=== F ===
Models
F10
- Toyota 2000GT (1967–1970, MF10, MF12)

F10

- Toyota Kijang / Toyota Tamaraw (1976–1981, KF10)

F20, F30

- Toyota Kijang / Toyota Tamaraw (1981–1986)

F40, F50

- Toyota Kijang / Toyota Tamaraw FX / Toyota Qualis (1986–2004)

F60, F70, F80

- Toyota Kijang / Toyota Tamaraw FX Revo (1996–2007)

=== G ===
Models
G10
- Toyota Crown Eight (1964–1967)

G20, G30, G40

- Toyota Century (1967–1997)

G50

- Toyota Century (1997–2017, G50)
- Toyota Century Royal (2006–2008, G51)

G60

- Toyota Century (2018–present)

G70

- Toyota Century (2023–present, SUV)

=== H ===
Models
H10
- Toyota HiAce (1967–1977)

H11, H20, H30, H40

- Toyota HiAce (1977–1985)

H50, H60, H70, H80, H90

- Toyota HiAce (1982–2007)
- Toyota HiAce Quick Delivery / Toyota Quick Delivery 100 (1982–1995, H80)

H100

- Toyota HiAce / Toyota RegiusAce (1989–2004)

H200

- Toyota HiAce / Toyota RegiusAce (2004–present)

H300

- Toyota HiAce / Toyota GranAce (2019–present)

=== J ===
Models

J

- Toyota BJ / Toyota Land Cruiser (1951–1955)

J20, J30

- Toyota Land Cruiser / Toyota Bandeirante (1955–1960)

J40

- Toyota Land Cruiser / Toyota Bandeirante (1960–2001)

J50

- Toyota Land Cruiser (1967–1980)

J60

- Toyota Land Cruiser (1980–1989)

J70

- Toyota Land Cruiser (1984–present)
- Toyota Land Cruiser Prado / Toyota Land Cruiser II (1990–1996)

J80

- Toyota Land Cruiser (1990–1997)
- Lexus LX (1995–1997)

J90

- Toyota Land Cruiser Prado (1996–2002)

J100

- Toyota Land Cruiser (1998–2007, J100: Independent front suspension)
- Toyota Land Cruiser (1998–2007, J105: Solid-axle, J80 based chassis)
- Lexus LX / Toyota Land Cruiser Cygnus (1998–2007, J100)

J120

- Toyota Land Cruiser Prado (2002–2009)
- Lexus GX (2002–2009)

J150

- Toyota Land Cruiser Prado / Toyota Land Cruiser (2009–2023)
- Lexus GX (2009–2023)

J200

- Toyota Land Cruiser / Toyota Land Cruiser V8 (2007–2021)
- Lexus LX (2007–2021)

J250

- Toyota Land Cruiser Prado / Toyota Land Cruiser (2023–present)
- Lexus GX (2023–present)

J300

- Toyota Land Cruiser (2021–present)

J310

- Lexus LX (2021–present)
Engines

BJ Platform (Type B engine)

- 1951–1955 Toyota Land Cruiser

FJ Platform (F, 2F, 3F engine)

- 1954– Toyota Land Cruiser

BJ Platform (B, 2B, 3B, 13B engine)

- 1974–1990 Toyota Land Cruiser

HJ Platform (H, 2H, 12H engine)

- 1980–1990 Toyota Land Cruiser

LJ Platform (2L, 5L engine)

- 1984–present Toyota Land Cruiser
- 1993–present Toyota Land Cruiser Prado

HZJ Platform (1HZ engine)

- 1989–present Toyota Land Cruiser (J70)
- 1998–2007 Toyota Land Cruiser (J105)

KZJ Platform (KZ engine)

- 1993–1996 Toyota Land Cruiser
- 1996–2006 Toyota Land Cruiser Prado

FZJ Platform

- 1989–1997 Toyota Land Cruiser

PZJ Platform (1PZ engine)

- 1990–1995 Toyota Land Cruiser (J70)

HDJ Platform (1HD-T and 1HD-FT engines)

- 1990–1998 Toyota Land Cruiser (J80)
- 1998–2006 Toyota Land Cruiser (J100; Land Cruiser Cygnus)

KDJ Platform (1KD engine)

- 2006–present Toyota Land Cruiser Prado

VDJ Platform (1VD-FTV engine)

- 2007–2021 Toyota Land Cruiser (J200)

UZJ Platform (2UZ-FE V8)

- 1996–2011 Toyota Land Cruiser
- 1998–2006 Toyota Land Cruiser (J100; Land Cruiser Cygnus)

URJ Platform (1UR-FE, 3UR-FE V8 engine)

- 2007–2021 Toyota Land Cruiser (J200)
- 2007–2021 Lexus LX 570 (J200)
- 2009–2023 Lexus GX 460 (J150)

GRJ Platform (1GR-FE/FSE V6)

- 2007–2021 Toyota Land Cruiser (J200)
- 2009–2023 Toyota Land Cruiser Prado (J150)

TRJ Platform (2TR-FE engine)

- 2004–present Toyota Land Cruiser Prado

=== K ===
Models
K, K10
- Toyopet SK / Toyopet RK (1953–1956)
- Toyopet SKB Light Truck / Toyopet ToyoAce (1954–1960)

K20, K30

- Toyopet RK / Toyopet Stout (1956–1960)
- Toyopet ToyoAce (1958–1971)

K50

- Toyopet Route Truck RK52 (1956–1959)

K60, K70, K80

- Toyopet Route Truck / Toyota Dyna (1957–1963)

K40, K100

- Toyopet Lite Stout (1963–1967, K40)
- Toyopet Stout / Toyota Stout (1960–1978, K45, K100)

K170

- Toyopet Dyna (1963–1968)

K110

- Toyota Stout (1979–1989)

K10

- Toyota Sai (2009–2017, AZK10)

L

Models
L10
- Toyota Tercel / Toyota Corsa (1978–1982)

L20

- Toyota Tercel / Toyota Corsa / Toyota Corolla II / Toyota Sprinter Carib (1982–1988)

L30

- Toyota Tercel / Toyota Corsa / Toyota Corolla II (1986–1990)

L40

- Toyota Tercel / Toyota Corsa / Toyota Corolla II (1990–1994)
- Toyota Paseo / Toyota Cynos (1991–1995)

L50

- Toyota Tercel / Toyota Corsa / Toyota Corolla II / Toyota Soluna (1994–2003)
- Toyota Paseo / Toyota Cynos (1995–1999)

L10

- Lexus GS (2011–2020)

=== M ===
Models
M10
- Toyota LiteAce (1970–1979, van, wagon)
- Toyota LiteAce (1970–1979, truck)

M20

- Toyota LiteAce (1979–1985, van, wagon)
- Toyota LiteAce / Toyota TownAce (1979–1986, truck)

M30, M40, M50, M60, M70, M80

- Toyota LiteAce (1985–1991, van, wagon)
- Toyota LiteAce / Toyota TownAce (1986–2007, truck)

=== N ===
Models
N10
- Toyota Hilux (1968–1972)

N20

- Toyota Hilux / Toyota Truck (1972–1978)

N30, N40

- Toyota Hilux / Toyota Truck (1978–1983)

N50, N60, N70

- Toyota Hilux / Toyota Truck (1983–1988)
- Toyota Hilux Surf / Toyota 4Runner (1983–1989, N60)

N80, N90, N100, N110

- Toyota Hilux / Toyota Truck (1988–1997)
- Toyota Classic (1996, N86)

N120, N130

- Toyota Hilux Surf / Toyota 4Runner / Toyota Hilux SW4 (1989–1995)

N140, N150, N160, N170, N190

- Toyota Tacoma (1995–2004)
- Toyota Hilux (1997–2005, N140, N150, N160, N170)
- Toyota Hilux Sport Rider / Toyota Sport Rider (1998–2004)

N180

- Toyota Hilux Surf / Toyota 4Runner / Toyota Hilux SW4 (1995–2002)

N210

- Toyota Hilux Surf / Toyota 4Runner (2002–2009)

N220, N240, N250, N260, N270

- Toyota Tacoma (2004–2015)

N280

- Toyota 4Runner (2009–2024)

N300

- Toyota Tacoma (2015–2023)

N400

- Toyota Tacoma (2023–present)

N500

- Toyota 4Runner (2024–present)
Engines
RN Platform (2R, 3R, 8R, 12R, 18R, 20R, 22R engine)
- 1968–1988 Toyota Hilux
- 1984–1995 Toyota Hilux Surf (4Runner in some markets)

LN Platform (L, 2L, 3L, 5L engine)

- 1981–2001 Toyota Hilux
- 1984–1993 Toyota Hilux Surf (4Runner in some markets)

YN Platform (1Y, 2Y, 3Y engine)

- 1983–1995 Toyota Hilux
- 1984–1995 Toyota Hilux Surf (4Runner in some markets)

KZN Platform (1KZ-TE engine)

- 2001 Toyota Hilux
- 1994–2009 Toyota Hilux Surf

KDN Platform (1KD-FTV engine), (2KD-FTV engine)

- 2002–2004 Toyota Hilux
- KDN165 "2KD-FTV"
- KDN166 "1KD-FTV" (In some countries)

RZN Platform

- 1996–2002 Toyota Hilux Surf (4Runner in some markets)

VZN Platform

- 1988–2002 Toyota Hilux Surf (4Runner in some markets)

GRN Platform (1GR-FE engine)

- 2003–2009 Toyota Hilux Surf (4Runner in some markets)
- 2010–2024 Toyota 4Runner

TRN Platform (2TR-FE engine)

- 2001–2004/2007–2009 Toyota Land Cruiser Prado
- 2010 Toyota Hilux Surf (4Runner in some European Markets, 2WD only)

UZN Platform (2UZ-FE engine)

- 2003–2009 Toyota Hilux Surf (4Runner in some markets)
- 2003–2009 Lexus GX470
- 2003–2007 Toyota Hilux Surf Baja

=== P ===
Models
P10
- Toyota Publica (1961–1966)
- Toyota Sports 800 (1965–1969, P15)

P20

- Toyota Publica (1966–1969)

P100

- Toyota MiniAce (1967–1975)

P30, P40, P50

- Toyota Publica / Toyota 1000 (1969–1988, P30, P50)
- Toyota Publica Starlet (1973–1978, P40, P50)

P60

- Toyota Starlet (1978–1984)

P70

- Toyota Starlet (1984–1989)

P80

- Toyota Starlet (1989–1995)

P90

- Toyota Starlet (1996–1999)

=== R ===
Models
R
- Toyopet Master / Toyopet Masterline (1955–1959)

R10

- Toyota TownAce (1976–1982, van, wagon)
- Toyota TownAce (1978–1982, truck)

R20, R30

- Toyota TownAce / Toyota MasterAce Surf / Toyota Van / Toyota Tarago (1982–1991, van, wagon)
- Toyota TownAce / Toyota LiteAce / Toyota Spacia (1992–1996, van, wagon)

R40, R50

- Toyota TownAce / Toyota LiteAce / Toyota Spacia (1996–2007, van, wagon)

R60

- Toyota Noah / Toyota Voxy (2001–2007)

R70

- Toyota Noah / Toyota Voxy / Toyota NAV1 (2007–2017)

R80

- Toyota Noah / Toyota Voxy / Toyota Esquire (2014–2021)

R90

- Toyota Noah / Toyota Voxy (2022–present)

=== S ===
Models
S, S10, S20, S30
- Toyopet Crown (1955–1962)
- Toyopet Master Ribbon (1956–195?, S10)
- Toyopet Masterline (1959–1962, S20, S30)

S40

- Toyopet Crown / Toyota Crown (1962–1967)
- Toyopet Masterline / Toyota Crown (1962–1970)

S50

- Toyopet Crown / Toyota Crown (1967–1971)

S60, S70

- Toyota Crown (1971–1974)

S80, S90, S100

- Toyota Crown (1974–1979)

S110

- Toyota Crown (1979–1983)

S120

- Toyota Crown (1983–1987)

S130

- Toyota Crown (1987–2000)

S140

- Toyota Crown (1991–1995)
- Toyota Aristo / Lexus GS (1991–1997)

S150

- Toyota Crown (1995–2001)

S160

- Toyota Aristo / Lexus GS (1997–2005)

S170

- Toyota Crown (1999–2007)

S180

- Toyota Crown (2003–2009)

S190

- Lexus GS (2005–2011)

S200

- Toyota Crown (2008–2015)

S210

- Toyota Crown (2012–2020)

S220

- Toyota Crown (2018–2022)

S230

- Toyota Crown (Sedan type) (2023–present, S230, S232)
- Toyota Crown (Crossover type) / Toyota Crown SportCross (2022–present, S235)
- Toyota Crown (Sport type) (2022–present, S236)
- Toyota Crown (Estate type) / Toyota Crown Signia (2024–present, S238)
Engines
RS Platform (R,3R, 5M engine)
- 1955–1983 Toyota Crown

GS Platform (1G engine)

- 1978.5–1997 Toyota Crown
- 1991.5-1994 Toyota Crown Athlete G
- 1989.5-1998 Toyota Comfort

MS Platform (3M, 4M, 5M, 7M engine)

- 1967–1988 Toyota Crown
- 1989.5–1998 Toyota Comfort

GRS Platform (2GR, 3GR, 4GR V6 engines)

- 2003–2008 Toyota Crown Athlete
- 2003–2008 Toyota Crown Royal Saloon
- 2006–2007 Lexus GS300
- 2007–2011 Lexus GS350

JZS Platform (1JZ, 2JZ engine)

- 1991–2006 Toyota Aristo
- 1988.5–2004 Toyota Crown Athlete
- 1989–1999 Toyota Crown Royal
- 1993–2005 Lexus GS300

UZS Platform (1UZ, 3UZ engines)

- 1989.5–1999, 2001–2012 Toyota Crown Majesta
- 1991.5–2006 Toyota Crown Royal
- 1991–2006 Toyota Aristo 4.0i/V40/iFour
- 1998–2000 Lexus GS400
- 2001–2008 Lexus GS430

URS Platform (1UR-FE, 1UR-FSE)

- 2008–2012 Toyota Crown Majesta
- 2008–2011 Lexus GS460

GWS Platform (2GR-FSE)

- 2009–present Toyota Crown Hybrid
- 2012–2018 Toyota Crown Majesta
- 2007–2020 Lexus GS450h Hybrid

=== T ===
Models

T10

- Toyopet Corona (1957–1960)
- Toyopet Coronaline (1957–1960)

T20, T30

- Toyopet Corona / Toyota Tiara (1960–1964)
- Toyopet Coronaline (1960–1964)

T40, T50

- Toyopet Corona / Toyota Corona (1964–1972)
- Toyota 1600GT (1967–1969, T55)

T60, T70

- Toyopet Corona Mark II / Toyota Corona Mark II (1968–1972)

T80, T90

- Toyopet Corona / Toyota Corona (1970–1973)

T100, T110, T120

- Toyopet Corona / Toyota Corona (1973–1979)

T130

- Toyota Corona (1978–1983)

T140

- Toyota Corona (1982–1987)

T150

- Toyota Corona FF / Toyota Carina II (1983–1988)
- Toyota Carina FF (1984–1988)

T160

- Toyota Celica / Toyota Corona Coupé (1985–1989)
- Toyota Carina ED (1985–1989)

T170

- Toyota Corona / Toyota Carina II (1987–1995)
- Toyota Carina (1988–1992)

T180

- Toyota Celica (1989–1993)
- Toyota Carina ED / Toyota Corona EXiV (1989–1993)

T190

- Toyota Corona / Toyota Carina E / Toyota Caldina (1992–1998)
- Toyota Carina (1992–1996)

T200

- Toyota Celica / Toyota Curren (1993–1999)
- Toyota Carina ED / Toyota Corona EXiV (1993–1998)

T210

- Toyota Corona Premio (1996–2001)
- Toyota Carina (1996–2001)
- Toyota Caldina (1997–2002)

T220

- Toyota Avensis (1997–2003)

T230

- Toyota Celica (1999–2006)

T240

- Toyota Premio / Toyota Allion (2001–2007)
- Toyota Caldina (2002–2007)

T250

- Toyota Avensis (2003–2008)

T260

- Toyota Premio / Toyota Allion (2007–2021)

T270

- Toyota Avensis (2008–2018)
Engines

ADT model code (1AD, 2AD engine)

AT model code (3A, 4A, 5A, 7A engine)

AZT model code (1AZ, 2AZ engine)

CT model code (1C, 2C, 3C engine)

CDT model code (1CD engine)

ET model code (3E, 5E engine)

KT model code (5K engine)

NZT model code (1NZ engine)

PT model code (P, 2P, 3P engine)

RT model code (R, 2R, 3R, 4R, 5R, 6R, 7R, 8R, 9R, 12R, 16R, 18R, 20R, 21R, 22R engine)

ST model code (S, 1S, 2S, 3S, 4S, 5S engine)

TT model code (2T, 3T, 12T, 13T engine)

YT model code (2Y engine)

ZRT model code (1ZR, 2ZR, 3ZR engine)

ZZT model code (1ZZ, 2ZZ, 3ZZ engine)

=== U ===
Models

U10

- Toyota Dyna (1968–1977)
- Toyota Coaster (1969–1977)

U20, U30, U40, U50

- Toyota Dyna (1977–1984, 2–3 ton)

U60, U70, U80, U90

- Toyota Dyna / Toyota ToyoAce (1984–1995, 2–3.5 ton)

U100, U200

- Toyota Dyna / Toyota ToyoAce (1995–2000, 2–3 ton)
- Toyota Dyna Quick Delivery / Toyota ToyoAce Quick Delivery / Toyota Quick Delivery 200 (1999–2011)

U300, U400, U500

- Toyota Dyna / Toyota ToyoAce (1999–2011, 3 ton)

U600, U700, U800

- Toyota Dyna / Toyota ToyoAce (2011–present)

=== V ===
Models

V10

- Toyota Camry / Toyota Vista (1982–1986)

V20

- Toyota Camry / Toyota Vista / Lexus ES (1986–1991)

V30

- Toyota Camry / Toyota Vista (1990–1994, narrow-body)

V40

- Toyota Camry / Toyota Vista (1994–1998)

V50

- Toyota Vista (1998–2003)

=== W ===
Models

W10

- Toyota MR2 (1984–1989)

W20

- Toyota MR2 (1989–1999)

W30

- Toyota MR-S / Toyota MR2 Spyder / Toyota MR2 Roadster (1999–2007)
Engines

AW model code (3A, 4A engine)

SW model code (3S, 5S engine)

ZZW model code (1ZZ engine)

=== X ===
Models

X10, X20

- Toyopet Corona Mark II / Toyota Corona Mark II (1972–1976)

X30, X40

- Toyopet Corona Mark II / Toyota Cressida
- Toyota Chaser (1976–1980)

X50, X60

- Toyota Corona Mark II / Toyota Cressida (1980–1984)
- Toyota Chaser (1980–1984)
- Toyota Cresta (1980–1984)

X70

- Toyota Mark II / Toyota Cressida (1984–1988)
- Toyota Chaser (1984–1988)
- Toyota Cresta (1984–1988)

X80

- Toyota Mark II / Toyota Cressida (1988–1992)
- Toyota Chaser (1988–1992)
- Toyota Cresta (1988–1992)

X90

- Toyota Mark II (1992–1996)
- Toyota Chaser (1992–1996)
- Toyota Cresta (1992–1996)

X100

- Toyota Mark II (1996–2000)
- Toyota Chaser (1996–2001)
- Toyota Cresta (1996–2001)

X110

- Toyota Mark II (2000–2007)
- Toyota Verossa (2001–2004)

X120

- Toyota Mark X / Toyota Reiz (2004–2009)

X130

- Toyota Mark X / Toyota Reiz (2009–2019)
Engines

GX model code (1G engine)

- 1981.5-1989 Toyota Cresta
- 1985–1991 Toyota Chaser
- 1979–1994 Toyota Cressida
- 1980–2004 Toyota Mark II
- 2002–2007 Toyota Mark II Blit

MX model code (3M, 4M, 5M, 7M engine)

- 1981.5-1989 Toyota Cresta
- 1988–1989.5 Toyota Chaser
- 1982–1992.5 Toyota Cressida

GRX model code (2GR, 4GR V6)

- 2005–2019 Toyota Mark X

JZX model code (1JZ, 2JZ engine)

- 1991.5-2005 Toyota Mark II
- 1990–2001 Toyota Chaser
- 1990–1994 Toyota Cressida
- 2001–2007 Toyota Mark II Blit
- 1990–2001 Toyota Cresta
- 2001–2004 Toyota Verossa

=== Y ===
Models

Y10

- Toyopet Briska (1967–1968, GY10)

Y10

- Toyota ToyoAce (1971–1979)

Y20, Y30, Y40

- Toyota ToyoAce / Toyota Dyna / Toyota Dyna Rino (1979–2002, 1–1.5 ton)

Y50, Y60

- Toyota ToyoAce / Toyota Dyna (1985–1995, 1–1.5 ton)

Y100

- Toyota ToyoAce / Toyota Dyna (1995–2001, 1 ton)
- Toyota HiAce Quick Delivery / Toyota Quick Delivery 100 (1995–2001, Y150)

Y200

- Toyota ToyoAce / Toyota Dyna (2001–present, 1 ton)
- Toyota Urban Supporter (2001–2003)

=== Z ===
Models

Z10

- Toyota Soarer (1981–1985)

Z20

- Toyota Soarer (1986–1991)

Z30

- Lexus SC / Toyota Soarer (1991–2000)

Z40

- Lexus SC / Toyota Soarer (2001–2010)

Z100

- Lexus LC (2017–present)
Engines

MZ Platform (5M, 6M, 7M engine)

- 1981.5-1991 Toyota Soarer

GZ Platform (1G engine)

- 1981.5-1991 Toyota Soarer

JZZ Platform (1JZ, 2JZ engine)

- 1991–1996.5 Toyota Soarer 2.5GT
- 1992–2001 Toyota Soarer, 3.0G, GT
- 1991–2001 Lexus SC300

UZZ Platform (1UZ, 3UZ engine)

- 1991–2008 Toyota Soarer
- 1992–2001 Lexus SC400
- 2001–2009 Lexus SC430

URZ Platform (2UR engine)

- 2017– Lexus LC

GWZ Platform (8GR engine)

- 2017– Lexus LC

=== XA ===
Models

XA10

- Toyota RAV4 (1994–2003)

XA20

- Toyota RAV4 (2000–2005)

XA30

- Toyota RAV4 / Toyota Vanguard (2005–2016)

XA40

- Toyota RAV4 (2013–2019)

XA50

- Toyota RAV4 / Toyota Wildlander (2018–present)

XA60

- Toyota RAV4 (2025)
Engines

SXA platform (S engine)

- Toyota RAV4

ALA platform (2AD engine)

- 2008–2012 Toyota RAV4

ACA platform (2AZ engine)

- 2006–2016 Toyota RAV4
- 2007–2016 Toyota Vanguard

GSA platform (2GR engine)

- 2006–present Toyota RAV4
- 2008–2016 Toyota Vanguard

=== XC ===
Models

XC10

- Toyota Deliboy (1989–1995)

XC10

- Lexus RC (2014–2025)

=== XD ===
Models

XD10, XD20, XD30

- High Mobility Vehicle (military: XD10, XD30)
- Toyota Mega Cruiser (1995–2001, civilian: XD20)

=== XE ===
Models

XE10

- Toyota Altezza / Lexus IS (1998–2005)

XE20

- Lexus IS (2005–2015)

XE30

- Lexus IS (2013–present)
Engines

JCE Platform (2JZ equipped )

- 2000–2005 Lexus IS 300
- 2001–2005 Toyota Altezza Gita AS300

GXE Platform (1G equipped)

- 1998–2005 Toyota Altezza AS200
- 1999–2005 Lexus IS 200

SXE Platform (3S equipped)

- 1998–2005 Toyota Altezza RS200

GSE Platform (2GR/3GR/4GR equipped)

- 2005–2015 Lexus IS 250/IS 300/IS 350
- 2009–2015 Lexus IS 250C/IS 300C/IS 350C

USE Platform (2UR-FSE equipped)

- 2007–present Lexus IS F

=== XF ===
Models
XF10
- Lexus LS / Toyota Celsior (1989–1994)

XF20

- Lexus LS / Toyota Celsior (1994–2000)

XF30

- Lexus LS / Toyota Celsior (2000–2006)

XF40

- Lexus LS (2006–2017)

XF50

- Lexus LS (2018–present)
Engines
UCF Platform (1UZ-FE, 3UZ-FE engines)
- 1989–2000 Toyota Celsior (1UZ-FE)
- 2000-2006 Toyota Celsior (3UZ-FE)
- 1989–1994 Lexus LS400 (1UZ-FE)
- 1994–2000 Lexus LS400 (1UZ-FE)
- 2000–2006 Lexus LS430 (3UZ-FE)

USF Platform (1UR-FSE engine)

- 2006–present Lexus LS460 (USF40)
- 2008–present Lexus LS460 AWD (USF45)
- 2006–present Lexus LS460L (USF41)
- 2008–present Lexus LS460L AWD (USF46)

UVF Platform (2UR-FSE engine)

- 2007–present Lexus LS600h (Hybrid UVF45)
- 2007–present Lexus LS600hL (Hybrid UVF46)

=== XG ===
Models
XG10
- Toyota Progrès / Toyota Brevis (1998–2007)
- Toyota Origin (2000–2001, XG17)

XG10

- Toyota Corolla Cross / Toyota Frontlander (2020–present)
Engines
JCG platform (1JZ, 2JZ engine)
- 1998–2007 Toyota Progrès
- 2001–2007 Toyota Brevis

=== XH ===
Models
XH10, XH20
- Toyota Granvia / Toyota Hiace SBV (1995–2012)
Engines
KCH platform (1KZ engine)
- 1995–present Toyota Granvia

KLH platform (2KD engine)

- 1995–present Toyota Granvia (Hiace SBV)

LXH platform (2L engine)

- 1995–present Toyota Granvia (Hiace SBV)

RCH platform (2RZ engine)

- 1995–present Toyota Granvia (Hiace SBV)

VCH platform (5VZ engine)

- 1995–present Toyota Granvia (Hiace SBV)

=== XJ ===
Models
XJ10
- Toyota FJ Cruiser (2006–2022)
Engines
GSJ Platform (1GR-FE V6)
- 2006–2017 Toyota FJ Cruiser

=== XK ===
Models

XK10, XK20

- Toyota T100 (1992–1998)

XK30, XK40

- Toyota Tundra (1999–2006)
- Toyota Sequoia (2000–2007)

XK50

- Toyota Tundra (2006–2021)

XK60

- Toyota Sequoia (2007–2022)

XK70

- Toyota Tundra (2021–present)

XK80

- Toyota Sequoia (2022–present)
Engines

UCK Platform (2UZ-FE V8)

- 2001–2009 Toyota Sequoia

USK Platform (1UR-FE, 3UR-FE V8 engine)

- 2008–present Toyota Sequoia

=== XL ===
Models
XL10
- Toyota Sienna (1997–2002)

XL20

- Toyota Sienna (2003–2009)

XL30

- Toyota Sienna (2010–2020)

XL40

- Toyota Sienna / Toyota Granvia (2020–present)

=== XM ===
Models

XM10

- Toyota Ipsum / Toyota Picnic (1995–2001)
- Toyota Gaia (1998–2004)

XM20

- Toyota Ipsum / Toyota Avensis Verso / Toyota Picnic (2001–2010)
Engines

ACM platform (2AZ engine)

- 2001–present Toyota Ipsum (Avensis Verso/Picnic/SportsVan)

SXM platform (3S engine)

- 1996–2001 Toyota Ipsum (Picnic)

=== XN ===
Models

XN10

- Toyota Nadia (1998–2003)

=== XP ===
Models

XP10

- Toyota Vitz / Toyota Yaris / Toyota Echo (1998–2005, hatchback)
- Toyota Platz / Toyota Echo / Toyota Yaris (1999–2005, sedan, coupé)
- WiLL Vi (2000–2001, XP19)
- Toyota Aqua / Toyota Prius c (2011–2021)

XP20

- Toyota FunCargo / Toyota Yaris Verso (1999–2005)

XP30

- Toyota bB / Scion xB (2000–2005)

XP40

- Toyota Vios (2002–2014)

XP50

- Toyota Probox / Toyota Succeed (2002–2014)

XP60

- Toyota ist / Scion xA (2002–2007)

XP70

- WiLL Cypha (2002–2005)

XP80

- Toyota Sentia (2003–2015)

XP90

- Toyota Vitz / Toyota Yaris (2005–2013, hatchback)
- Toyota Belta / Toyota Yaris / Toyota Vios (2005–2016, sedan)

XP100

- Toyota Ractis (2005–2010)

XP110

- Toyota ist / Toyota Urban Cruiser / Scion xD (2007–2016)

XP120

- Toyota Ractis / Toyota Verso-S (2010–2017)

XP130

- Toyota Vitz / Toyota Yaris (2010–2020)

XP140

- Toyota Porte / Toyota Spade (2012–2020)

XP150

- Toyota Vios / Toyota Yaris L / Toyota Yaris (2013–present, sedan)
- Toyota Yaris / Toyota Yaris L / Toyota Vios FS (2013–present, hatchback)
- Toyota Yaris ATIV / Toyota Yaris / Toyota Vios (2017–present, sedan)

XP160

- Toyota Probox / Toyota Succeed (2014–present)

XP170

- Toyota Sienta (2015–2022)

XP210

- Toyota Yaris (2019–present)
- Toyota GR Yaris (2020–present)
- Toyota Yaris Cross (2020–present)
- Toyota Aqua (2021–present)
- Toyota Sienta (2022–present)
Engines

NCP Platform (1NZ, 2NZ engines)

- 1999–2005 Toyota Vitz (Yaris/Echo)
- 2005–2011 Toyota Vitz (Yaris)
- 2004–2006 Scion xB
- 2004–2006 Scion xA

NLP Platform (1ND engines)

- 2002–2005 Toyota Vitz (Yaris/Echo)
- 2005–2011 Toyota Vitz (Yaris)

ZSP Platform (2ZR engine)

- 2007–2014 Scion xD

=== XR ===
Models
XR10, XR20
- Toyota Estima / Toyota Previa / Toyota Tarago (1990–1999)

XR30, XR40

- Toyota Estima / Toyota Previa / Toyota Tarago (2000–2005)

XR50

- Toyota Estima / Toyota Previa / Toyota Tarago (2006–2021)
Engines
TCR Platform (2TZ engine)
- 1990–2000 Toyota Estima (Previa/Tarago)

ACR Platform (2AZ engine)

- 2000–2006 Toyota Estima (Previa/Tarago)
- 2006–2019 Toyota Estima (Previa/Tarago)

CLR Platform (1CD engine)

- 2000–2006 Toyota Estima (Previa)

GSR Platform (2GR engine)

- 2006–2019 Toyota Estima (Previa/Tarago)

MCR Platform (1MZ engine)

- 2000–2006 Toyota Estima (Previa)

=== XS ===
Models
XS10
- Toyota Comfort / Toyota Crown Comfort (1995–2017)
Engines
YXS (3Y engine)
- 1995–2017 Toyota Comfort (Crown Comfort)

LXS (2L engine)

- 1995–2017 Toyota Comfort (Crown Comfort)

=== XT ===
Models
XT10
- Toyota Opa (2000–2005)

=== XU ===
Models
XU10
- Toyota Harrier / Lexus RX (1997–2003)

XU20

- Toyota Highlander / Toyota Kluger (2000–2007)

XU30

- Toyota Harrier / Lexus RX (2003–2013)

XU40

- Toyota Highlander / Toyota Kluger (2007–2013)

XU50

- Toyota Highlander / Toyota Kluger (2013–2020)

XU60

- Toyota Harrier (2013–2020)

XU70

- Toyota Highlander / Toyota Kluger / Toyota Crown Kluger (2019–present)

XU80

- Toyota Harrier / Toyota Venza (2020–present)
Engines
ACU Platform (2AZ engine)
- 2007–present Toyota Harrier
- 2002–2007 Toyota Kluger

ASU Platform (1AR engine)

- 2007–2013 Toyota Highlander
- 2007–2013 Toyota Kluger

GSU Platform (2GR engine)

- 2003–2009 Toyota Harrier
- 2007–present Toyota Highlander
- 2006–2008 Lexus RX350
- 2007–2013 Toyota Kluger

MCU Platform (MZ V6 engine)

- 2003–2005 Lexus RX330
- 2003–2005 Toyota Harrier
- 2002–2006 Toyota Highlander

MHU Platform (HYBRID)

- 2004–present Toyota Kluger
- 2005–present Toyota Highlander
- 2005–2010 Toyota Harrier

=== XV ===
Models

XV10

- Toyota Camry / Toyota Scepter / Toyota Vienta (1991–1996, wide-body)
- Lexus ES / Toyota Windom (1991–1996)

XV20

- Toyota Camry / Toyota Mark II Qualis / Toyota Vienta (1996–2001)
- Toyota Camry Solara (1998–2003)
- Lexus ES / Toyota Windom (1996–2001)

XV30

- Toyota Camry (2001–2006)
- Toyota Camry Solara (2003–2008)
- Lexus ES / Toyota Windom (2001–2006)

XV40

- Toyota Camry / Toyota Aurion (2006–2012)
- Lexus ES (2006–2012)

XV50

- Toyota Camry / Toyota Aurion (2011–2017)

XV60

- Lexus ES (2012–2018)

XV70

- Toyota Camry (2017–2024)

XV80

- Toyota Camry (2023–present)
Engines

ACV Platform (2AZ-FE engine)

- 2002–2011 Toyota Camry
- 2006–2017 Toyota Aurion

ASV Platform (1AR, 2AR engine)

- 2012–2016 Toyota Camry

GSV 2006–present (2GR, 3GR, 4GR-FE V6)

- Toyota Camry
- Toyota Aurion
- Lexus ES350

MCV (1MZ, 2MZ, 3MZ V6 engine)

- 1994–2004 Toyota Windom
- 1994–2005 Toyota Camry, Toyota Camry Vienta
- 1994–2003 Lexus ES300
- 2004–2006 Lexus ES330

SXV platform (5S-FE, 3S-FE engine)

- 1991–2001 Toyota Camry
- 1991–1996 Toyota Windom

VCV (3VZ-FE 3.0 V6, 4VZ-FE 2.5 V6)

- 1991–1996 Toyota Camry Vienta
- 1991–1996 Toyota Windom
- 1992–1993.5 Toyota Camry
- 1992–1993 Lexus ES300

=== XW ===
Models

XW10

- Toyota Prius (1997–2003)

XW20

- Toyota Prius (2003–2012)

XW30

- Toyota Prius (2009–2015)

XW40

- Toyota Prius α / Toyota Prius v / Toyota Prius+ (2011–2021)

XW50

- Toyota Prius (2015–2022)

XW60

- Toyota Prius (2022–present)
Engines
NHW (1NZ engine)
- 1997–2003 Toyota Prius
- 2003–2009 Toyota Prius

ZVW (2ZR engine)

- 2009–present Toyota Prius

MXWH (M20A engine)

- 2022–present Toyota Prius

=== XX ===
Models

XX10

- Toyota Avalon (1994–2005)

XX20

- Toyota Avalon / Toyota Pronard (1999–2004)

XX30

- Toyota Avalon (2004–2012)

XX40

- Toyota Avalon (2012–2018)

XX50

- Toyota Avalon (2018–present)
Engines
MCX (1MZ V6)
- MY1995–1999 Toyota Avalon
- MY2000–2004 Toyota Avalon

GSX 2006–present (2GR V6)

- MY2005–2012 Toyota Avalon

=== XY ===
Models

XY10

- Toyota Sera (1990–1995)
Engines
EXY (5E engine)
- 1990–1996 Toyota Sera

=== XZ ===
Models

XZ10

- Toyota Raum (1997–2003)

XZ20

- Toyota Raum (2003–2011)

XZ10

- Lexus ES (2018–present)
Engines
EXZ (5E engine)
- 1997–2003 Toyota Raum

NCZ (1NZ engine)

- 2003–2011 Toyota Raum

=== AA ===
Models

AA10

- Toyota Mark X ZiO (2007–2013)

=== AB ===
Models

AB10, AB20, AB30

- Toyota Aygo (2005–2014)

AB40

- Toyota Aygo (2014–2021)

AB70

- Toyota Aygo X (2021–present)

=== AC ===
Models

AC10

- Toyota Passo (2004–2010)

AC20

- Toyota bB (2005–2016)

AC30

- Toyota Passo (2010–2016)

AC100

- Toyota Vios / Toyota Yaris (2022–present)

AC200

- Toyota Yaris Cross (2023–present)

=== AE ===
Models

AE10

- Toyota Wish (2003–2009)

AE20

- Toyota Wish (2009–2017)

=== AF ===
Models

AF10

- Lexus HS (2009–2018)

=== AG ===
Models

AG10

- Toyota Innova HyCross / Toyota Kijang Innova Zenix (2022–present)

=== AH ===
Models

AH10

- Toyota Alphard (2002–2008)

AH20

- Toyota Alphard / Toyota Vellfire (2008–2015)

AH30

- Toyota Alphard / Toyota Vellfire / Toyota Crown Vellfire (2015–2023)
- Lexus LM (2019–2023)

AH40

- Toyota Alphard / Toyota Vellfire / Toyota Crown Vellfire (2023–present)

=== AJ ===
Models

AJ10

- Toyota iQ / Scion iQ (2008–2015)

=== AK ===
Models
AK10
- Toyota Etios (2010–2023)
Engines
NGK Platform (2NR, 3NR engine)
- Toyota Etios
- Toyota Etios Liva
- Toyota Etios Cross

NUK Platform (1ND engine)

- Toyota Etios
- Toyota Etios Liva
- Toyota Etios Cross

=== AL ===
Models
AL10
- Lexus RX (2008–2015)

AL20

- Lexus RX (2015–2022)
Engines
GGL (2GR-FE engine)
- 2009–present Lexus RX350

GYL (2GR-FXE engine)

- 2009–present Lexus RX450h

=== ALA, ALH ===
Models

ALA10, ALH10

- Lexus RX (2022–present)

=== AM ===
Models
AM10
- Toyota Isis (2004–2017)

=== AN ===
Models
AN10, AN20, AN30
- Toyota Hilux (2004–2015)

AN40

- Toyota Innova / Toyota Kijang Innova (2004–2016)

AN50, AN60

- Toyota Fortuner / Toyota Hilux SW4 (2004–2016)

AN120, AN130

- Toyota Hilux (2015–present)
- Toyota Hilux Champ (2023–present, AN120)

AN140

- Toyota Innova / Toyota Kijang Innova (2015–present)

AN150, AN160

- Toyota Fortuner / Toyota SW4 (2015–present)
Engines
GUN Platform (1GD, 2GD engine)
- 2014–present Toyota Hilux / 2015–2022 Toyota Innova

KUN Platform (1KD, 2KD engine)

- 2004–2014 Toyota Hilux / Toyota Innova

TGN Platform (1TR, 2TR engine)

- 2004–2022 Toyota Innova

=== AP ===
Models

AP10

- Toyota Porte (2004–2012)
- Toyota JPN Taxi / Toyota Comfort Hybrid (2017–present)

=== AR ===
Models

AR10

- Toyota Corolla Verso (2004–2009)

AR20

- Toyota Verso / Toyota E'Z (2009–2018)

=== AS ===
Models

AS10

- Toyota Grand Highlander (2023–present)

=== AT ===
Models

AT10

- Scion tC (2004–2010)

AT20

- Scion tC / Toyota Zelas (2010–2016)
Engines

AGT model code (2AR engine)

ANT model code (2AZ engine)

=== AU ===
Models

AU10

- Lexus TX (2023–present)

=== AV ===
Models

AV10

- Toyota Venza (2004–2012)

=== AW ===
Models

AW10

- Lexus LM (2023–present)

=== AX ===
Models

AX10, AX50

- Toyota C-HR / Toyota IZOA (2016–2023)

AX20

- Toyota C-HR (2023–present)

=== AY ===
Models

AY10

- Lexus LBX (2023–present)

=== AZ ===
Models

AZ10

- Lexus NX (2014–2021)

AZ20

- Lexus NX (2021–present)

=== EA ===
Models

EA10

- Toyota bZ4X (2022–present)
- Toyota bZ3 (2023–present, EA10L)

=== EB ===
Models

EB10

- Lexus RZ (2023–present)

=== FA ===
Models

FA10

- Lexus LFA (2010–2012)

=== PD ===
Models

PD10

- Toyota Mirai (2014–2020)

PD20

- Toyota Mirai (2020–present)

=== RMV ===
Models

RMV10

- Toyota C^{+}pod (2021–2024)

== See also ==
- Toyota model codes
