= Toyota model codes =

Toyota vehicle model codes

Every Toyota vehicle has a model code which describes the basic vehicle (e.g. Corolla), its generation and major options (engine type, gearbox type, body style, grade level). The model codes fall into three periods, 1937 to late 1950s, late 1950s to late 1970s and late 1970s to present. There was some overlap as new models were phased in using new codes while old models were phased out using the old codes. The model code is not the same as the VIN.

== 1937 to 1956 ==
Each model was known by its engine code and a single letter for the chassis/body.

Examples:

Code	Engine	Body
AA	A type	1936-43 sedan
AB	A type	1936-43 cabriolet
AC	A type	1943–1948 sedan
SA	S type	1947–1952 sedan
BJ	B type	1953–1955 Jeep (later renamed as the Land Cruiser)
FJ	F type	1954–1955 Jeep (later renamed as the Land Cruiser)
RH	R type	1953–1955 sedan
RR	R type	1955–1956 Master sedan
RS	R type	1955–1958 Crown sedan

== 1956 to 1977 ==
Each model was known by its engine code, chassis code, one or two digits for its generation, a single digit for variations within the generation and more letters representing options.

engine family	platform	generation	variation	steering	-	options
T	E	2	1	L	-	CAFD

Engine family:

F	F
K	3K-C, ...
M	2M, 4M, ...
R	3R-C, 8R-C, 18R-C, ...
T	2T-C, ...

Platform:

Code	Meaning
E	Corolla
A	Celica
J	Land Cruiser
N	Pickup truck (aka Hilux)
P	1000 / Publica
S	Crown
T	Corona
X	Mark II

Steering:

Code	Meaning
blank	RHD (for Japan)
L	LHD
R	RHD

Options:

Code	Meaning
A	USA or Canada
C	2-speed automatic
D	Deluxe
G	Fold down tailgate
F	4-door
H	3-speed automatic (A30) with floor shift
J	3-speed automatic (A40)
K	4-speed manual with floor shift
M	5-speed manual with floor shift
N	3-speed automatic (A30) with column shift
V	Station wagon (on some models)

== 1977 to present ==
The new code was similar to the previous but now the options were grouped into specific columns.

engine family	suffix of engine family or prefix of platform or combination (optional)	platform	generation	variation	steering	wagon (optional)	-	model name (optional)	body type	transmission	grade	engine class	market
M		S	12	3	L		-	S	E	M	G	F	W

Engine family:

A	2A, 4A, ...
C	1C, 2C, ...
E	1E, 2E, 3E, 4E, 5E
F	F, ...
H	HZ,...
K	4K, ...
L	L, 2L, ...
M	5M, 6M, 7M
R	8R, 18R, 20R, 21R, 22R, ...
S	1S, 2S, 3S, 4S, 5S
T	2T, 3T, ...
Y	1Y, 2Y, 3Y, ...

Platform and model name:

Platform	Model name
A	Carina (RWD), Celica (RWD), Supra
B	Coaster
D	Blizzard
E	Corolla/Sprinter/Levin
F	Kijang/Tamaraw/Unser/Zace/Qualis
G	Crown Eight/Century
H	HiAce
J	Land Cruiser
K	Stout
L	Tercel/Corolla II/Corsa/Soluna
M	LiteAce
N	Pickup truck (aka Hilux)
P	Starlet
R	Model F (aka Tarago, Van, Space Cruiser), Previa/Estima
S	Crown
T	Corona/Carina (FWD/AWD)/Celica (FWD/AWD)/Curren/Caldina
U	Dyna
V	Camry/Scepter/Vista/Vienta/Aurion
W	MR2
X	Mark II/Chaser/Cresta/Cressida/Verossa/Mark X
Y	ToyoAce
Z	Soarer/Lexus SC/LC

Steering:

Code	Meaning
blank	RHD
R	RHD
L	LHD

Wagon:

Code	Meaning
blank	not wagon or van
G	wagon or Van

Model name:

Body type:

Code	Passenger vehicle	Commercial vehicle
C	coupé	
D	2-door sedan	pick-up (double-cab)
E	4-door sedan	
G	3-door hatchback	wagon
H	5-door hatchback	
K	2-door convertible	
L	liftback	
P		pickup
R		van
S	2-door hardtop	softtop
T	4-door hardtop	pick-up (single-cab)
V	2-door van	van hardtop
W	4-door wagon	
X	4-door van	
Y	2-door blind van	
Z	2-door wagon	

Transmission:

Code	Meaning
J	4-speed manual, column shift
B	4-speed manual, column shift
K	4-speed manual, floor shift
M	5-speed manual, floor shift
F	6-speed manual, floor shift
C	2-speed automatic
H	3-speed automatic
S	4-speed automatic, column shift
P	4-speed automatic, floor shift
G	5-speed automatic, floor shift
L	6-speed automatic, floor shift
X	CVT automatic, floor shift

Grade:

Engine class:

Code	Meaning
blank	standard engine with single carburetor
B	twin carburetors
C	emission control
E	EFI
F	twin cam, EFI
G	twin cam
H	hybrid electric
S	standard engine with single carburetor
X	diesel turbo

Destination :

Code	Meaning
blank	General Countries
A	USA
C	Switzerland, Sweden
D	Indonesia
E	Malaysia
G	Brazil
H	Argentina
K	Canada
M	The Philippines
N	South Africa
Q	Australia
R	Taiwan
T	Thailand
U	Vietnam
V	Middle East
W	Europe
X	India

== See also ==
- List of Toyota model codes
