= Toyota Sprinter Carib =

Compact station wagon produced by Toyota (1982–2002)

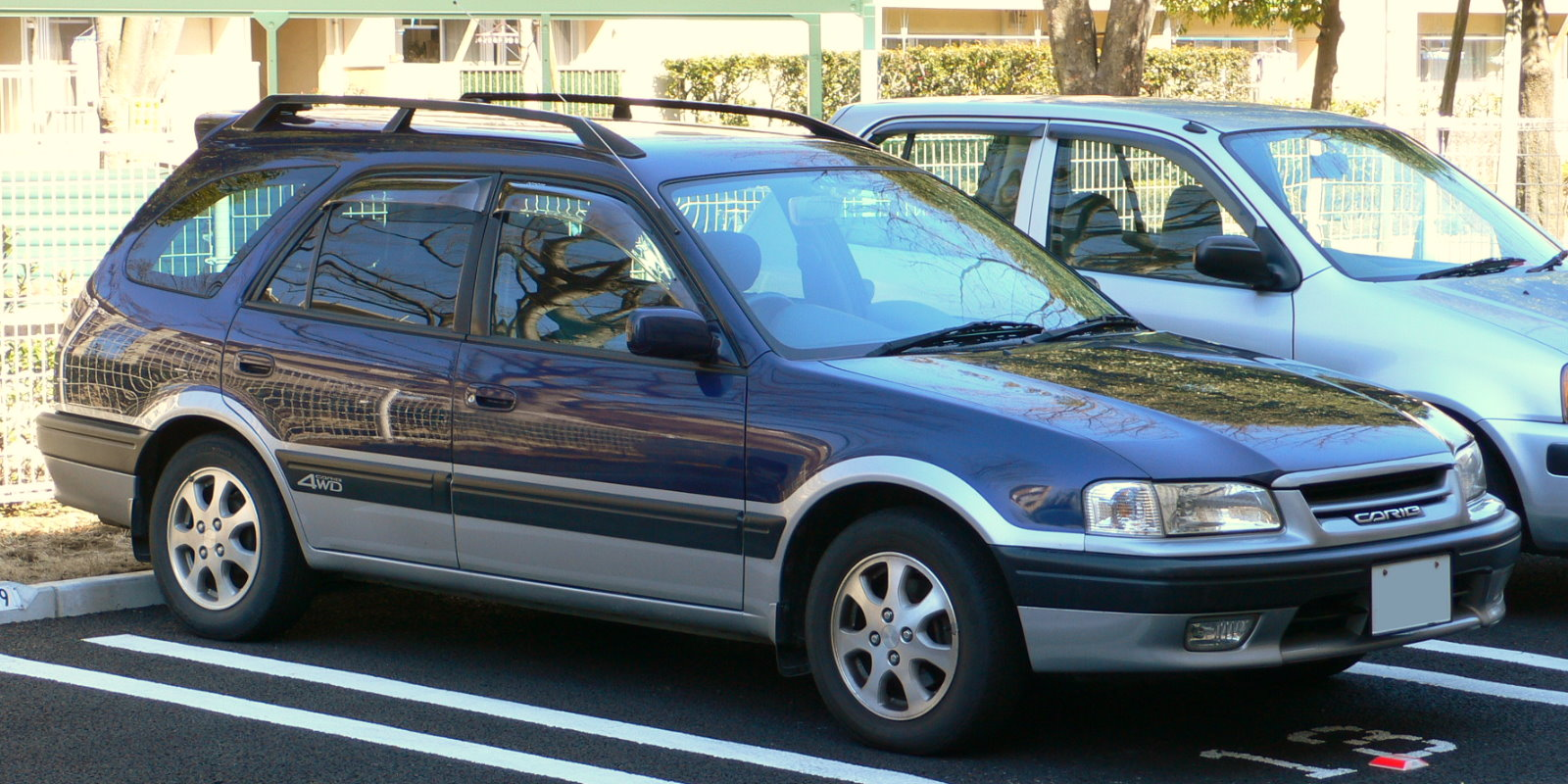
- Toyota Sprinter Carib (E110)

Overview
- Manufacturer: Toyota
- Production: August 1982 – August 2002
- Assembly: Japan: Takaoka Plant, Toyota City (August 1982 – July 1990); Ōbu, Aichi (Toyota Industries: August 1990 – August 2002)

Body and chassis
- Class: Compact car
- Body style: 5 door wagon
- Layout: Front engine, front-wheel drive (E110 only); Front engine, all-wheel drive

Chronology
- Successor: Toyota Voltz; Toyota Corolla (E120) wagon

The Toyota Sprinter Carib (Japanese: トヨタ・スプリンター カリブ, Toyota Supurintā Karibu) is a front engine, all-wheel drive station wagon produced by Toyota under the Sprinter nameplate from 1982 until 2002. The first generation was based on second generation Tercel and exported as Tercel AWD wagon, while the last two generations were based on Corolla/Sprinter wagons and exported as Corolla wagons.

The name "Carib" comes from the caribou, intended to inspire image of this strong animal, so graceful as it gallops over mountains and snow-covered plains.

== First generation (AL25G; 1982) ==
First generation
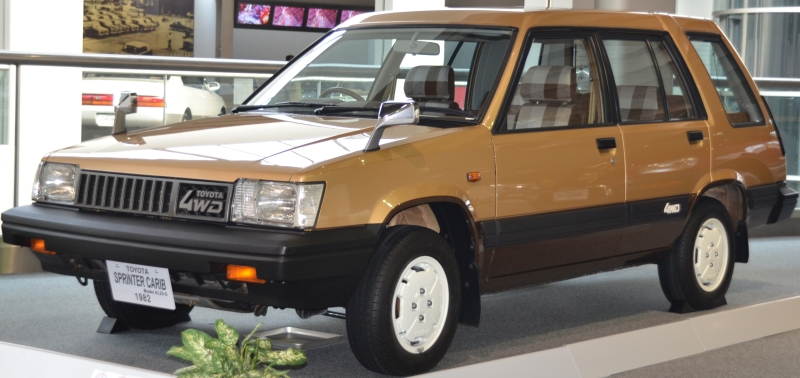
- Toyota Sprinter Carib AV-II with long bumper (AL25G, pre-facelift)

Overview
- Model code: AL25G
- Also called: Toyota Tercel 4WD wagon
- Production: 1982–1987
- Assembly: Japan: Takaoka Plant, Toyota City

Body and chassis
- Related: Toyota Tercel (L20)

Powertrain
- Engine: 1.5 L 3A/3-C/SU/U I4
- Transmission: 6-speed Z52F/Z54F manual; 3-speed A55F automatic

Dimensions
- Wheelbase: 2,430 mm (95.7 in)
- Length: 4,175–4,310 mm (164.4–169.7 in)
- Width: 1,615 mm (63.6 in)
- Height: 1,500 mm (59.1 in)
- Curb weight: 970–1,015 kg (2,138.5–2,237.7 lb)

The first Sprinter Carib was introduced first for the Japanese market in August 1982, it was later exported as Tercel 4WD wagon as a part of second generation Tercel's range shortly. The car was introduced first as a concept car called "RV-5" at the Tokyo Motor Show in October 1981.

The Sprinter Carib was Toyota's response to the growing demand of 4WD RV style wagons, a segment which Subaru took an early lead in 1972 with the Leone/DL/GL AWD wagon. The wagon had two different minor exterior styling depending on the market. The model with vertical grille and long bumpers was only available for the Japanese (lower model "AV-I" had short bumpers) and North American market. While European and Australasian market got a different version with Japanese market Corolla II grille and front bumper.

The wagon was only powered by a 1.5 L engine and mated to a six-speed manual transmissions (5-speed plus "extra low" (EL) gear) or a 3-speed automatic transmission (added in October 1983) and could be shifted from two- to four-wheel drive without coming to a stop by moving the 4WD lever from FWD to 4WD mode (button switch for the automatic transmission). The EL gear is a standard transmission gear with a very low (4.71:1) gear-ratio. The EL gear generates a 17.5:1 final drive ratio, giving the driver the torque needed to extract the vehicle from conditions which otherwise may have trapped it. It is only available when in four-wheel drive mode, and because of its low gear-ratio it is suitable only for very low-speed use. Also included with better equipped models was an inclinometer above the radio and air conditioner that measures the tilt of the car, shared with J70 Land Cruiser.

The new Tercel 4WD was built from existing pieces in the Toyota inventory. The engine, transaxle and front-wheel-drive system were from the existing Tercel; the longitudinally mounted engine made such a conversion a simple affair. The coil-sprung, live rear axle and the drive shaft was taken from the rear-wheel drive E70 Corolla/Sprinter. The only major part specifically designed for the new Tercel 4WD was the transfer case, built into the transmission.

The transfer case provides the driver with three different power arrangements: Normally, the car is operated with front-wheel drive. When the driver pulls the 4WD selector lever back into four-wheel drive, or presses a button on the gear selector for the automatic transmission, front and rear differentials are driven at the same RPM via a direct mechanical coupling. There is no conventional centre differential, so the four-wheel-drive system can be used only on loose or slippery road surfaces (such as snow, gravel, or sand); otherwise the drivetrain experiences severe wear, and handling is compromised. The third power option (which was only available on the manual transmission) is low range. This is not the same as the low-range power option found in a truck or conventional SUV, as the Tercel lacks a high-range-low-range transfer case. When the lever is placed in four-wheel-drive mode it becomes possible to down shift the vehicle from first to EL.

In August 1984, the Sprinter Carib received several updates with the new dual Venturi carburetors engine called 3A-SU for the top model with manual transmission, refreshed interior and changing the 4WD lever for the manual models to button switch just like the automatic model. For the 1985 model year, the manual transmission was changed from Z52F to Z54F. The EL (lowered to 4.871), first and reverse gears were revised for better off-road crawling ability. The final drive was also improved from 3.727 to 4.100 for better acceleration and tractability. The engine and exterior were also revised for European and Australasian markets. Another improvement arrived in May 1987 with the implementation of Toyota's TEMS suspension (Japan only) and new front grille Japanese and North American markets.

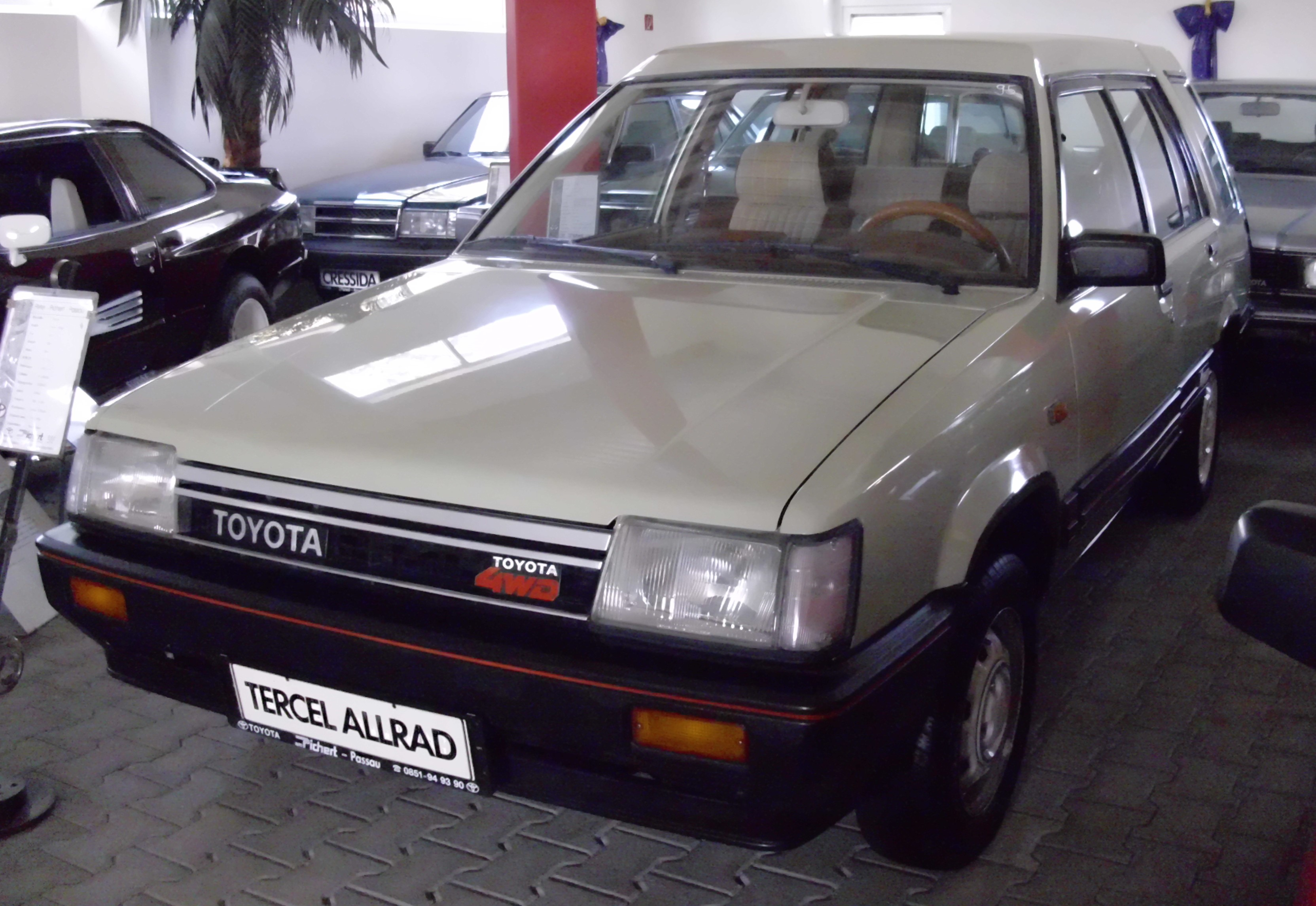
Tercel 4WD wagon (Europe, pre-facelift)

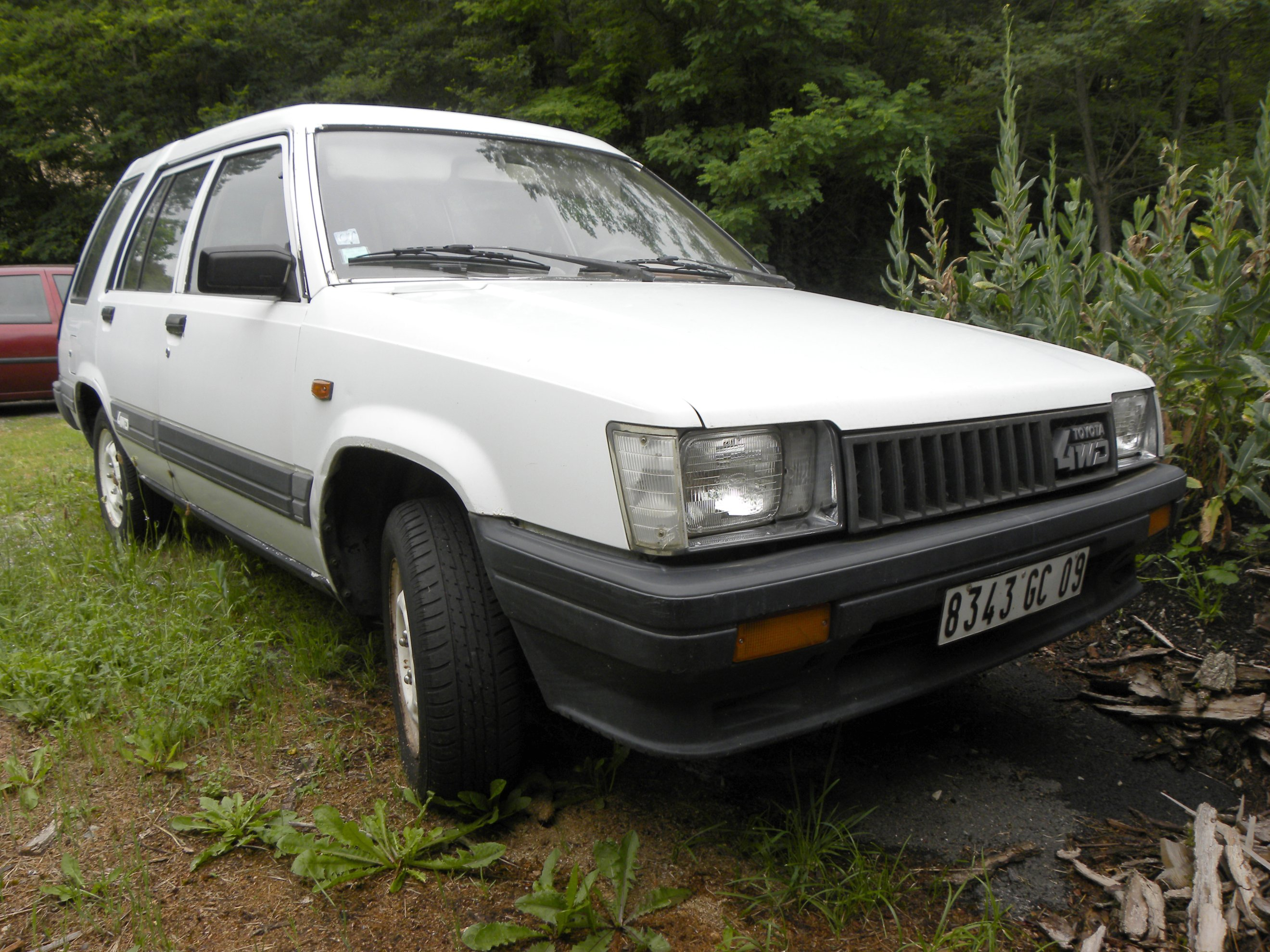
Tercel 4WD wagon (pre-facelift, short bumper)

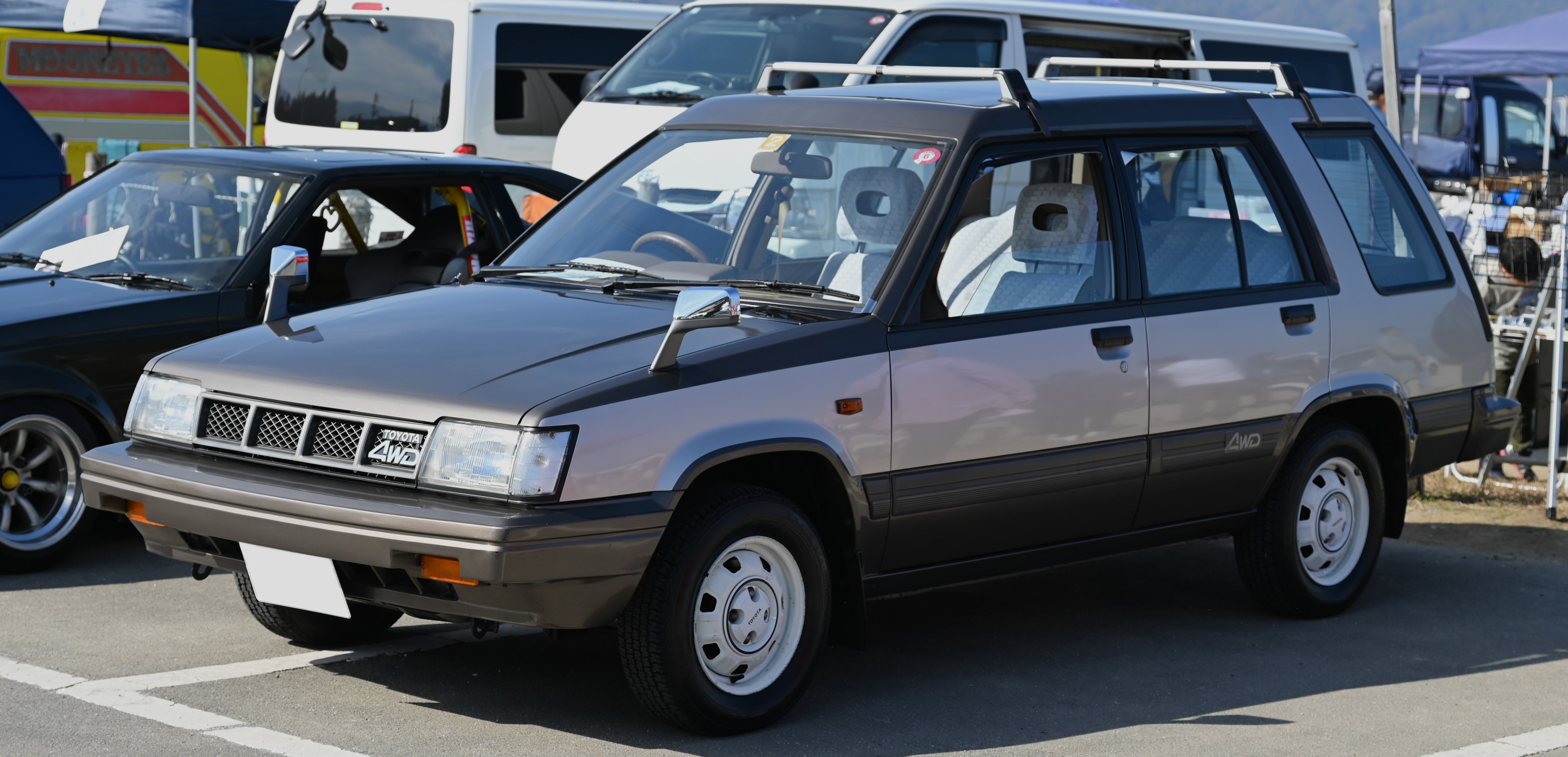
Sprinter Carib 4WD (Japan, facelift)

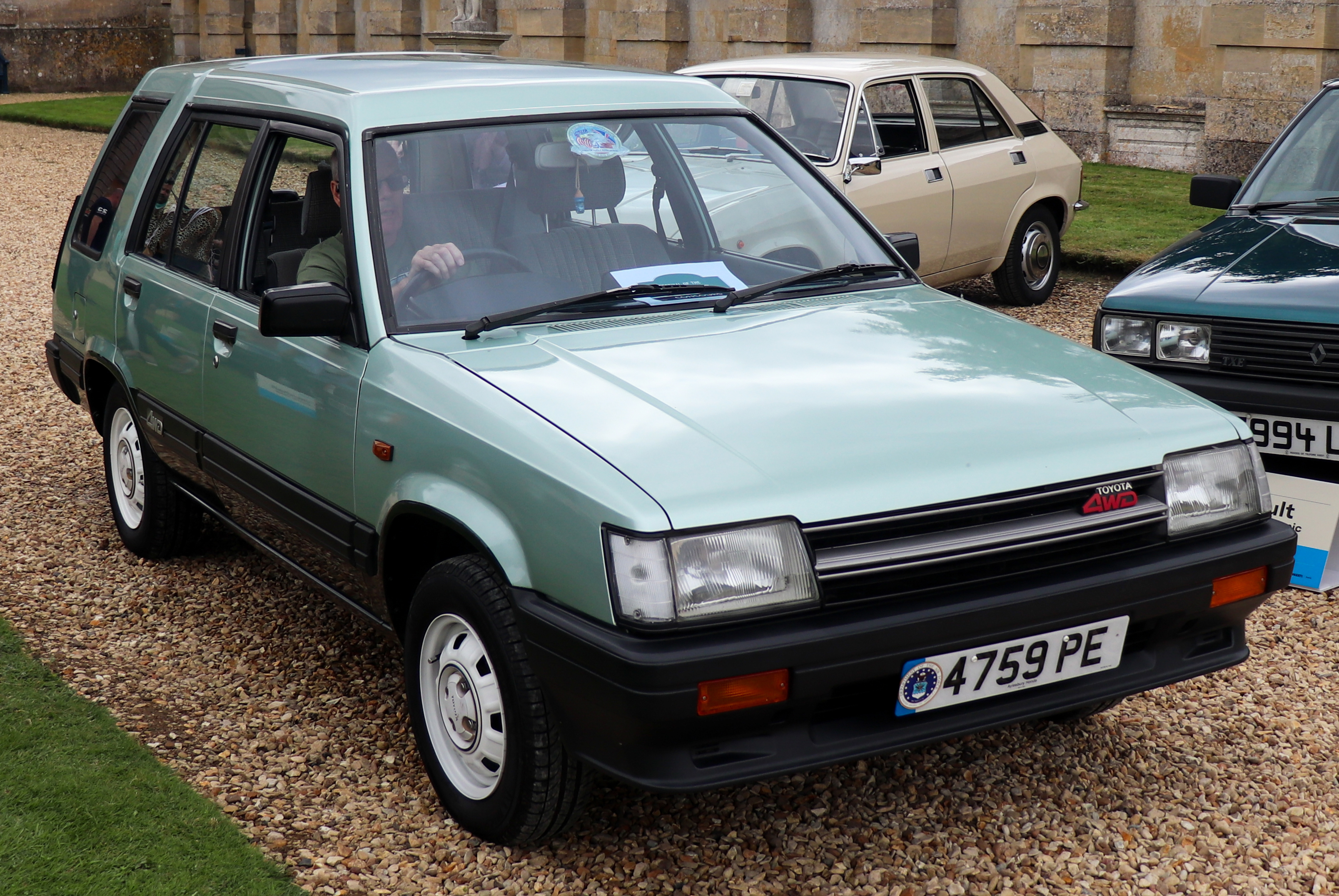
Tercel 4WD wagon (Europe, facelift)

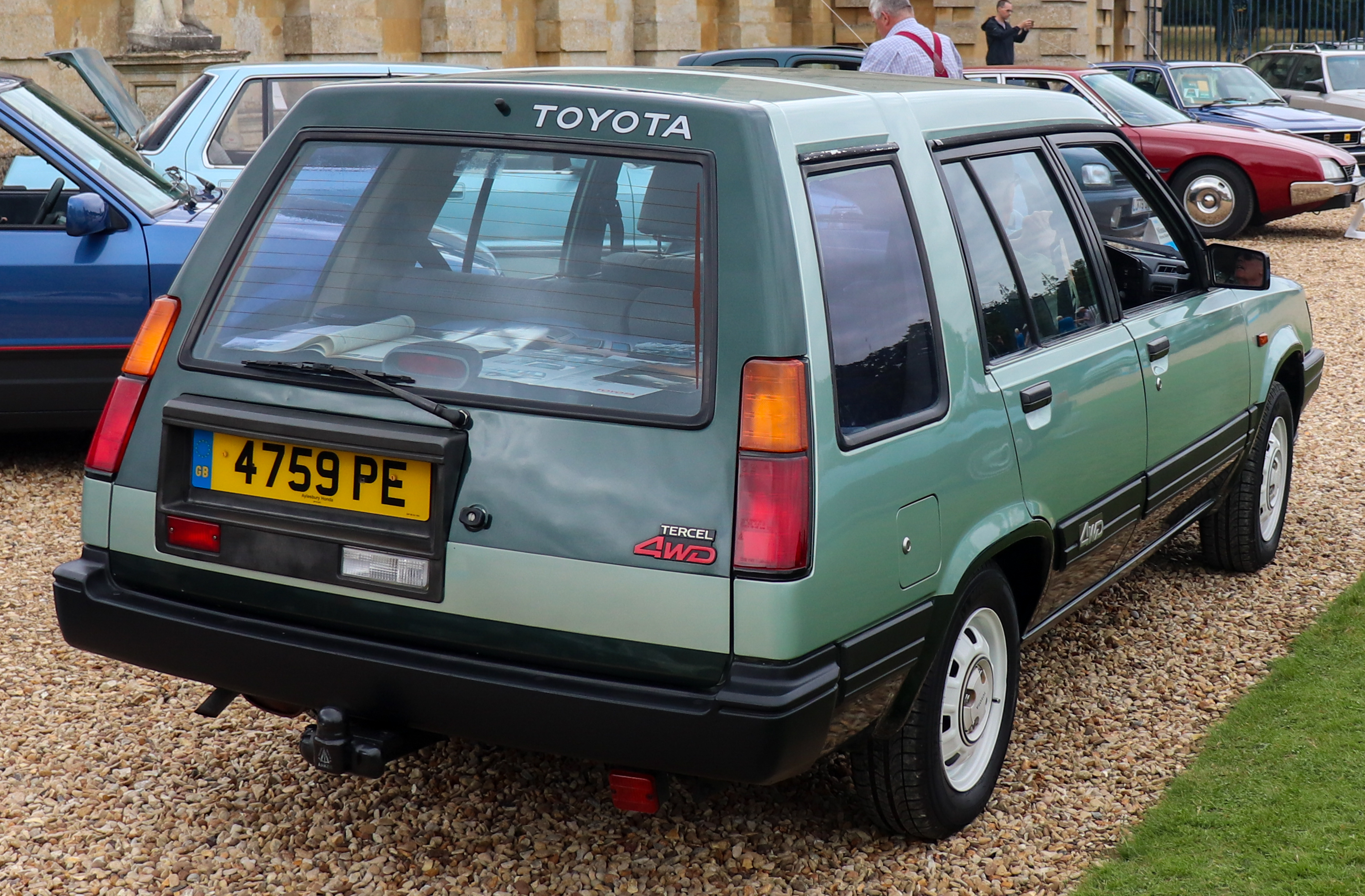
Rear view (short bumper)

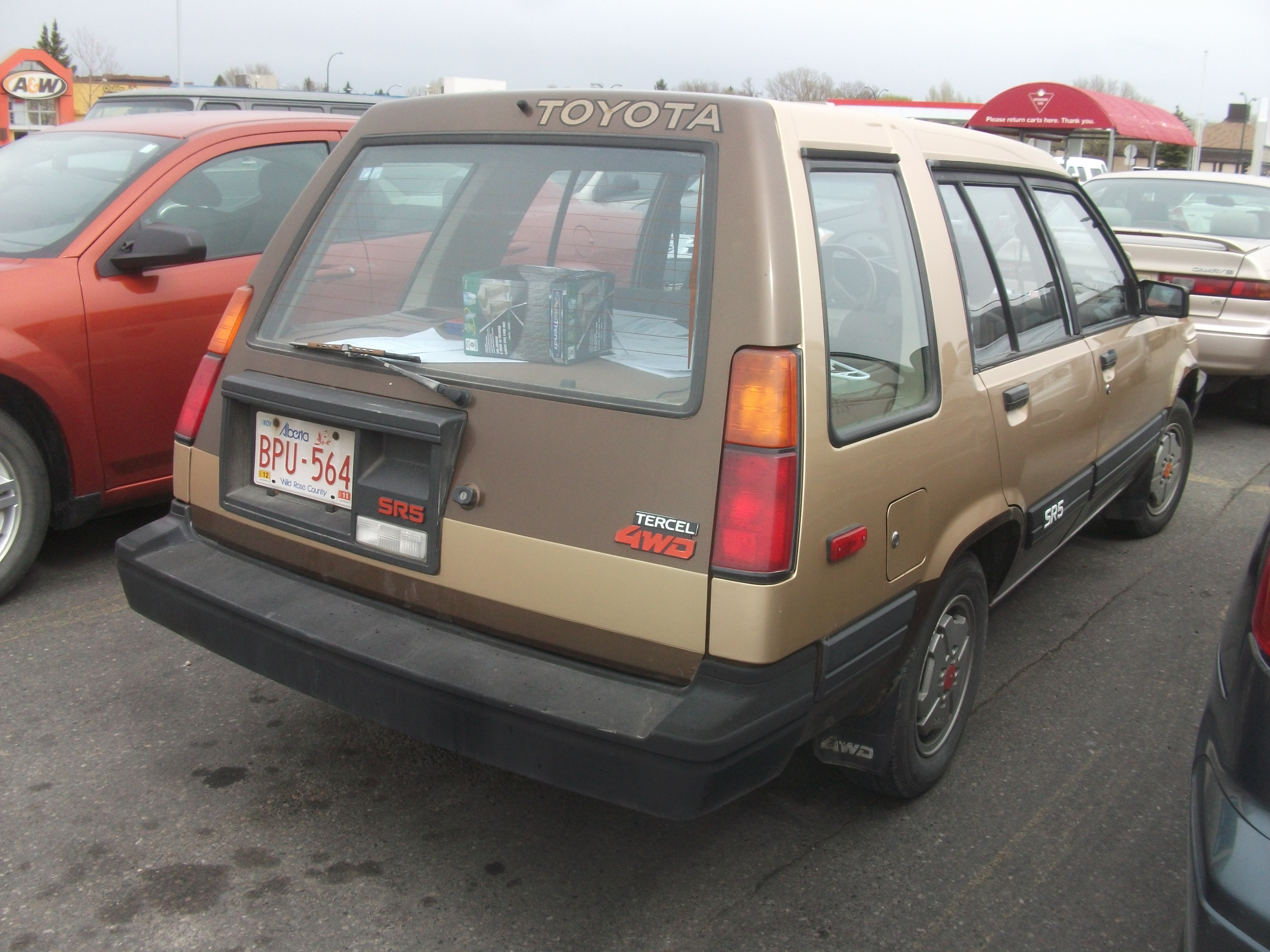
Rear view (long bumper)

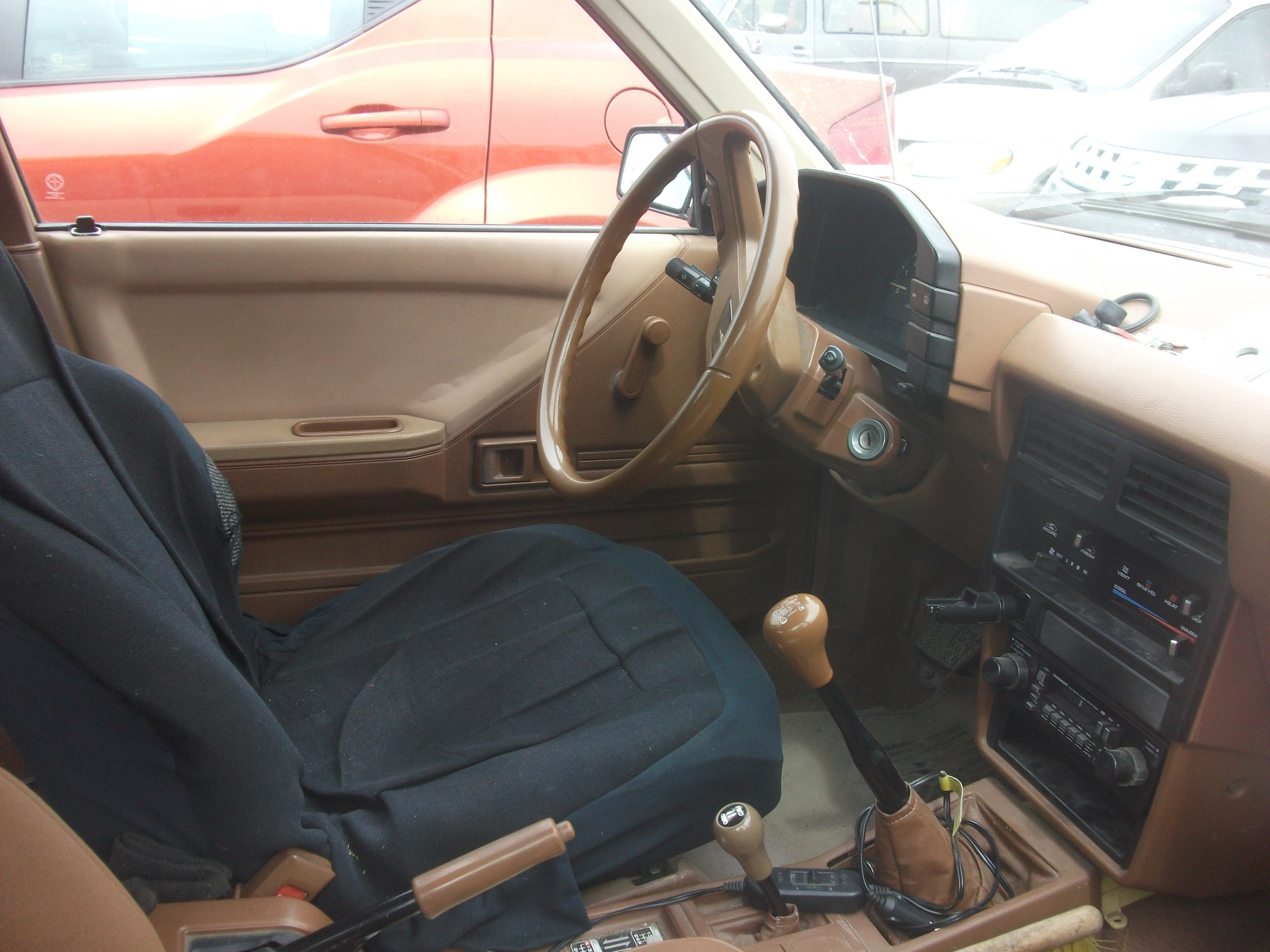
Interior (pre-facelift)

== Second generation (AE95G; 1988) ==
Second generation
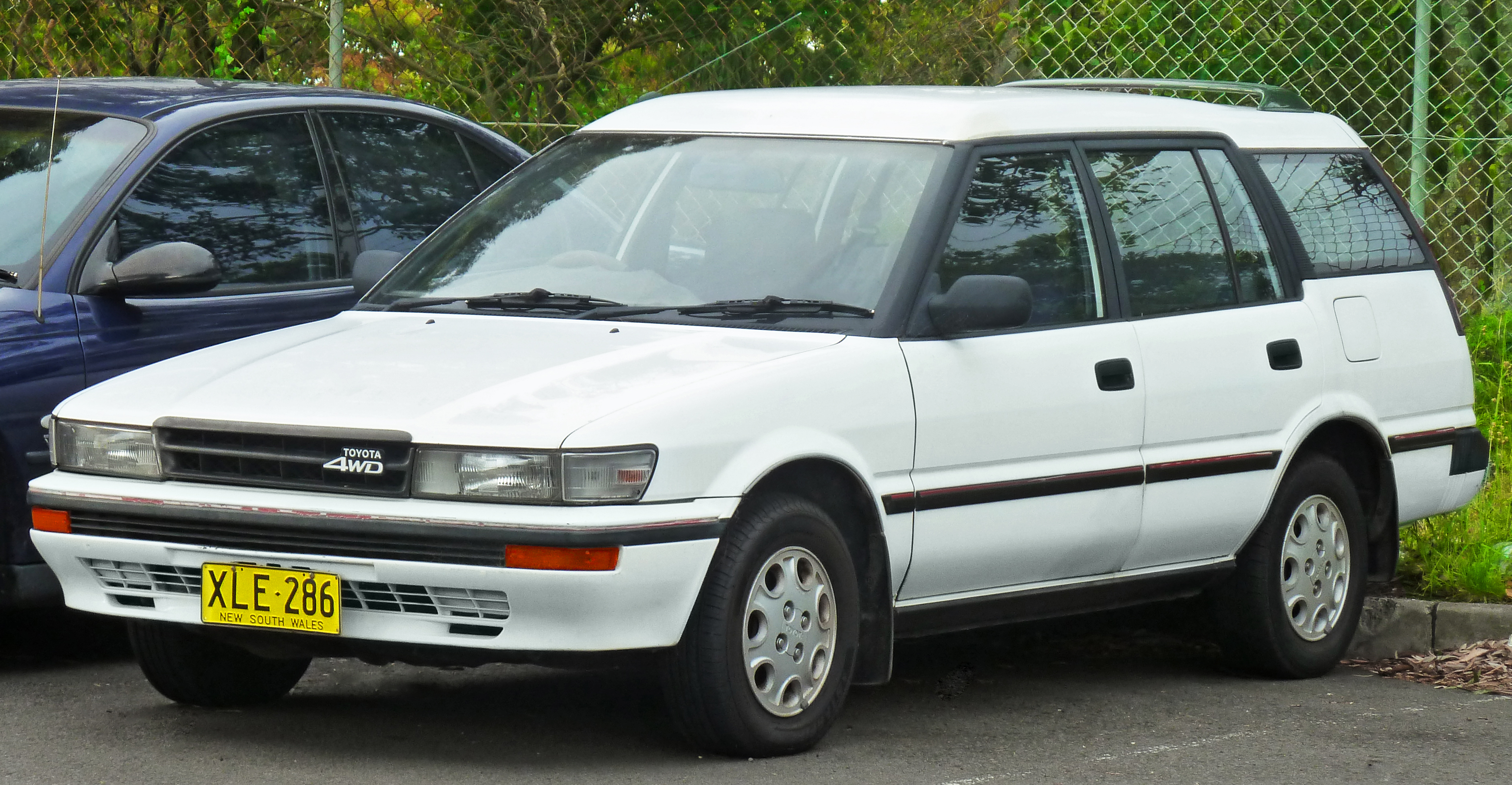
- Toyota Corolla 4WD SR5 wagon (Australia, pre-facelift)

Overview
- Model code: AE95G
- Also called: Toyota Corolla 4WD wagon (Europe, South America and Australasia); Toyota Corolla Tercel 4WD (Europe); Toyota Corolla All-Trac wagon (North America)
- Production: 1987–1995

Body and chassis
- Related: Toyota Corolla (E90); Toyota Sprinter (E90); Toyota Corolla Levin/Sprinter Trueno (E90); Geo Prizm (E90)

Powertrain
- Engine: 1.6 L 4A-F/FE/FHE I4
- Transmission: 5-speed E57F5 manual; 4-speed A241H automatic

Dimensions
- Wheelbase: 2,430 mm (95.7 in)
- Length: 4,250–4,370 mm (167.3–172.0 in)
- Width: 1,655 mm (65.2 in)
- Height: 1,450–1,485 mm (57.1–58.5 in)
- Curb weight: 1,110–1,160 kg (2,447.1–2,557.4 lb)

The second generation Sprinter Carib was launched in February 1988 and exported as Corolla 4WD wagon to the most part of the world, Corolla Tercel 4WD to some part of Europe (such as Germany or Switzerland) or Corolla All-Trac wagon to North America. Unlike the previous model, this generation was developed using the E90 Corolla/Sprinter wagon body shell's with rear end mimicking the previous generation style.

Unlike the older Tercel-based Sprinter Carib, the four-wheel drive system was changed from part-time to full-time model, which could be operated by pressing the "center diff lock" button. When it locked, the 4WD system would split the power 50/50 between the front and rear wheels. In unlocked mode, most of the power would go to the front wheels. The engine layout was changed to transverse layout like normal front-wheel drive-based 4WD cars, modernized with a bigger 1.6 L DOHC 16-valve unit with carburettor or fuel injection depending on the market. The engine coupled with either 5-speed manual or 4-speed automatic transmissions. In Japan, selected models came with a height control switch, which could raise the body by 30 mm (1 in) to suit the road conditions. When the speed exceeds 80 km/h (50 mph), the vehicle height is automatically returned to the normal height to ensure stability.

The wagon was improved in August 1990 with new front bumper, grille, wheels design and revised engine called 4A-FHE for the Japanese market. In September 1991, Toyota released the E100 Corolla wagon. Instead of being replaced by the newer generation, it gained another improvements with standard 3-point rear seat belts and enhanced side door beams. This version continued for sale side by side with the E100 wagon in Japan (through different dealer channels), as the E100 wagons didn't have a four-wheel drive version until May 1995. This situation also happened to several markets (such as Australia or Germany) as the 4WD offering. The final improvement occurred in August 1993 with additional driver side's airbag, bigger 14-inch wheels and brakes.

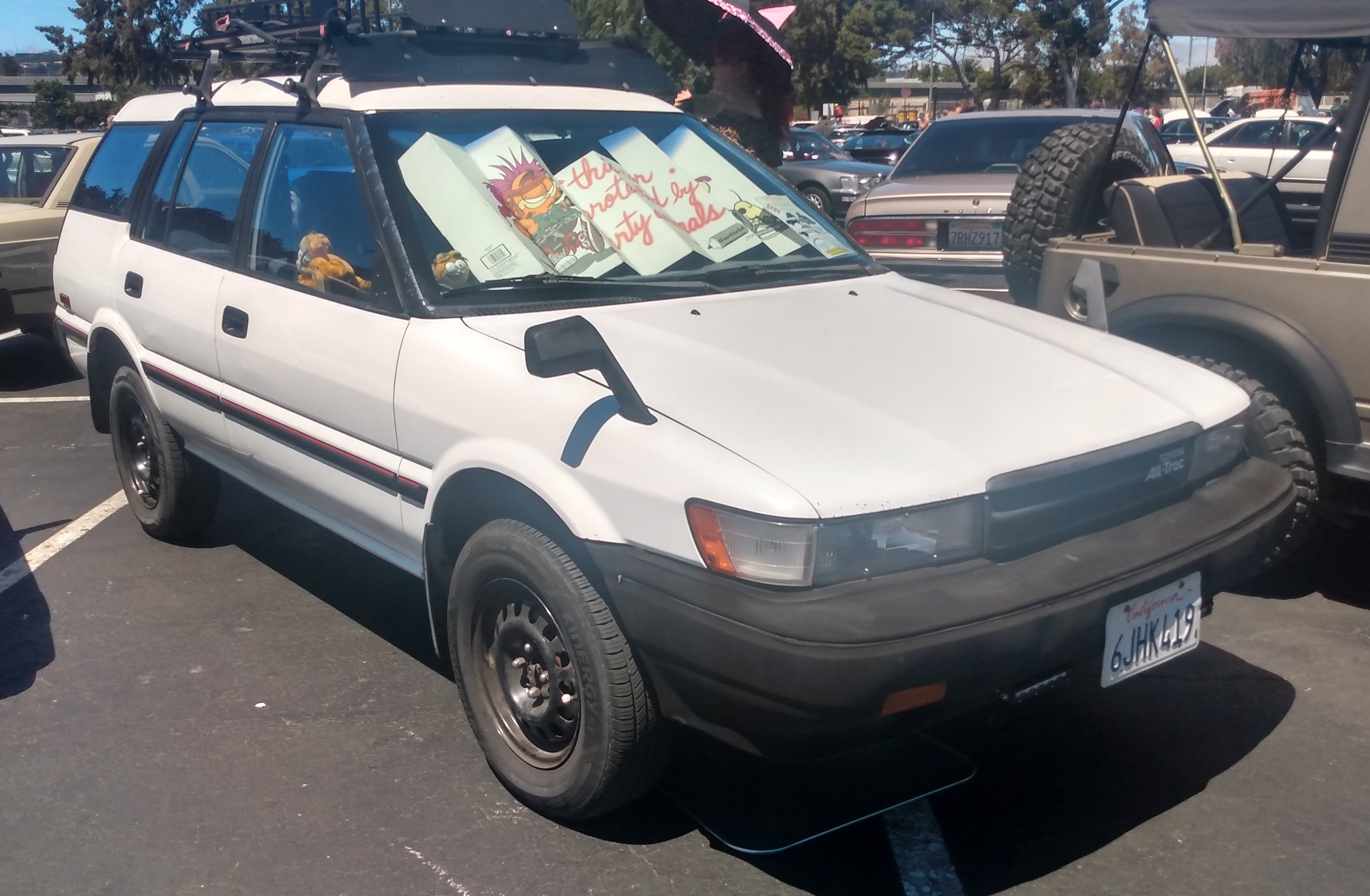
Corolla All-Trac DX wagon (US, pre-facelift)

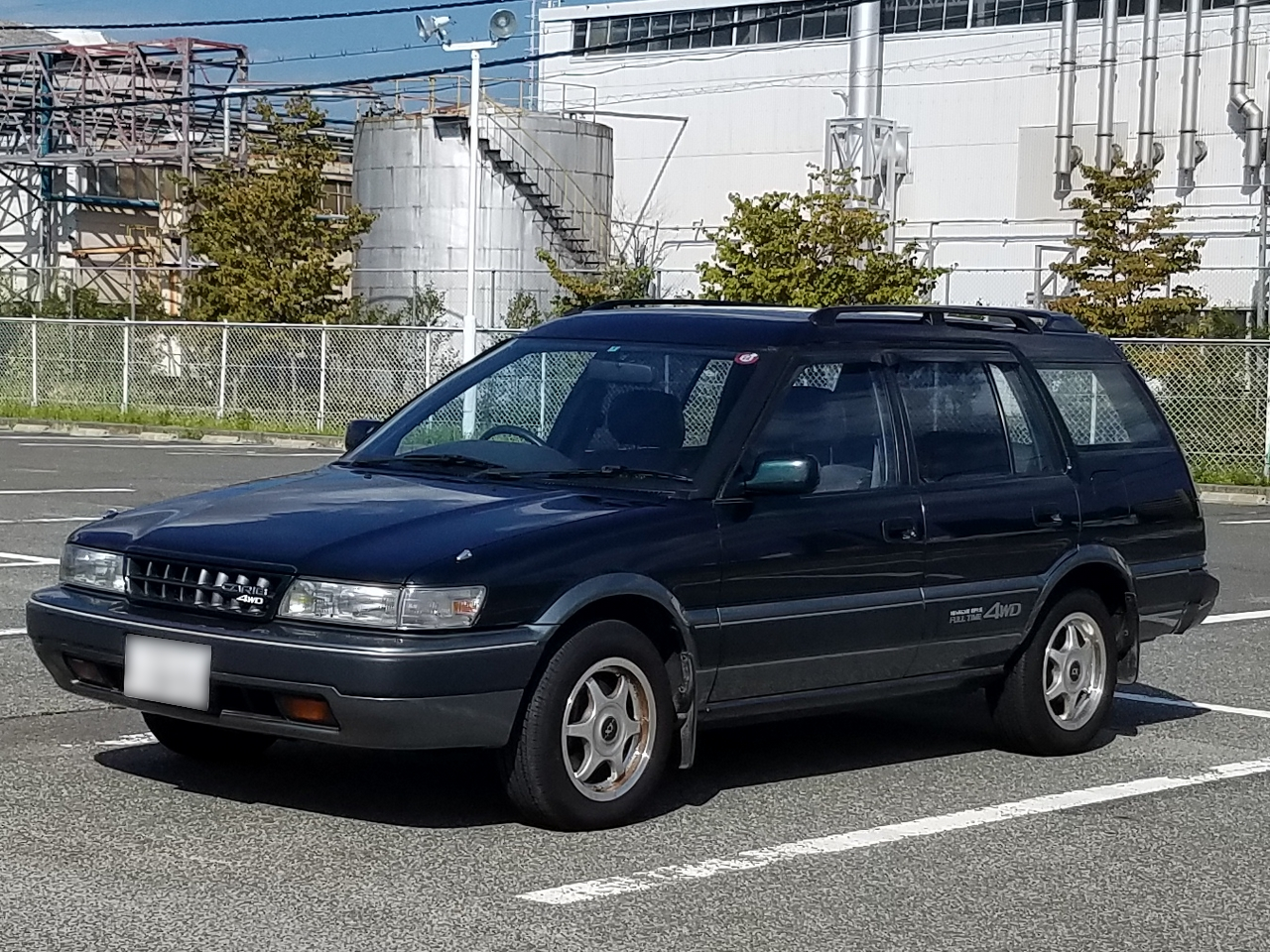
Sprinter Carib RV Special (Japan, facelift)

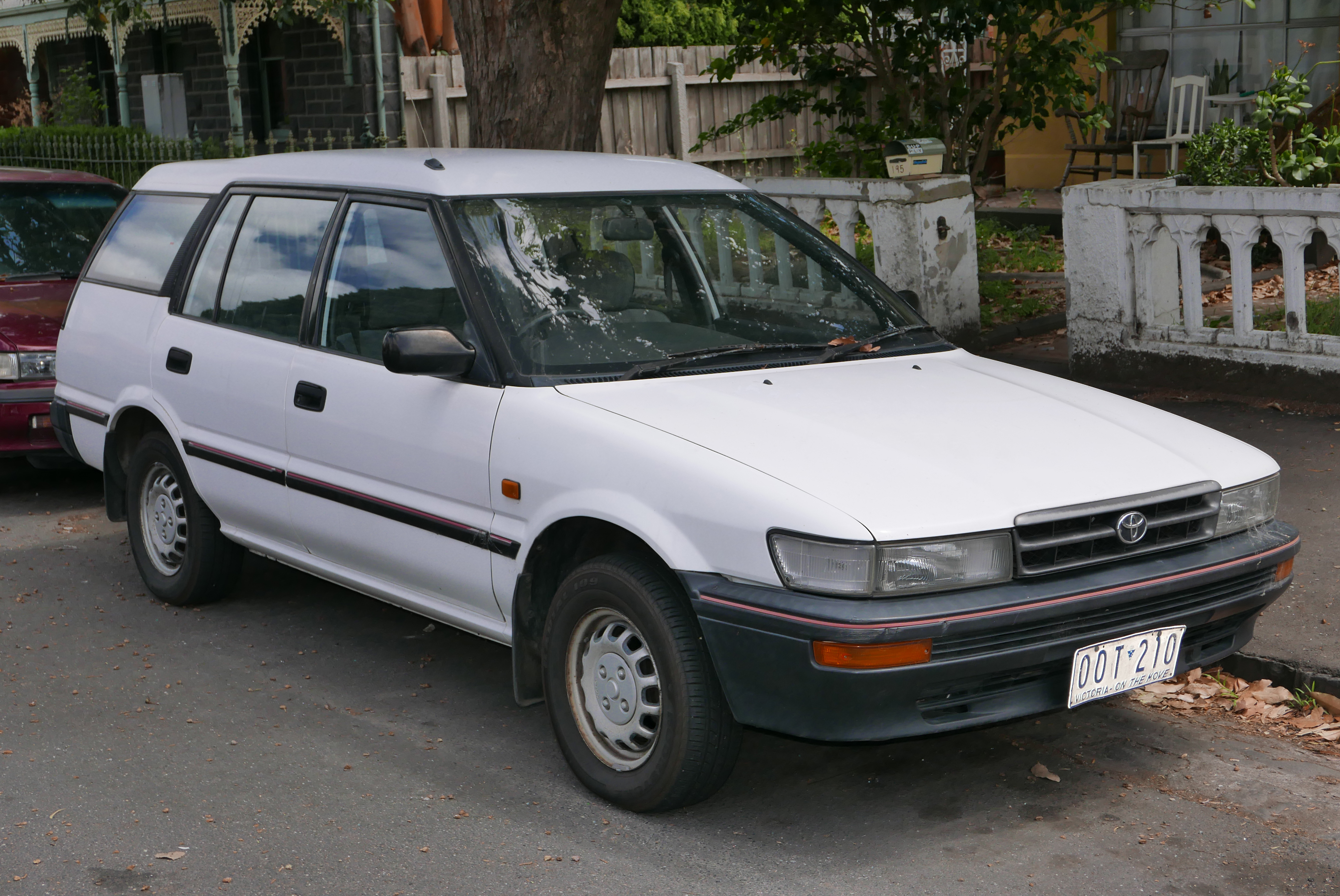
Corolla 4WD XL wagon (Australia, facelift)

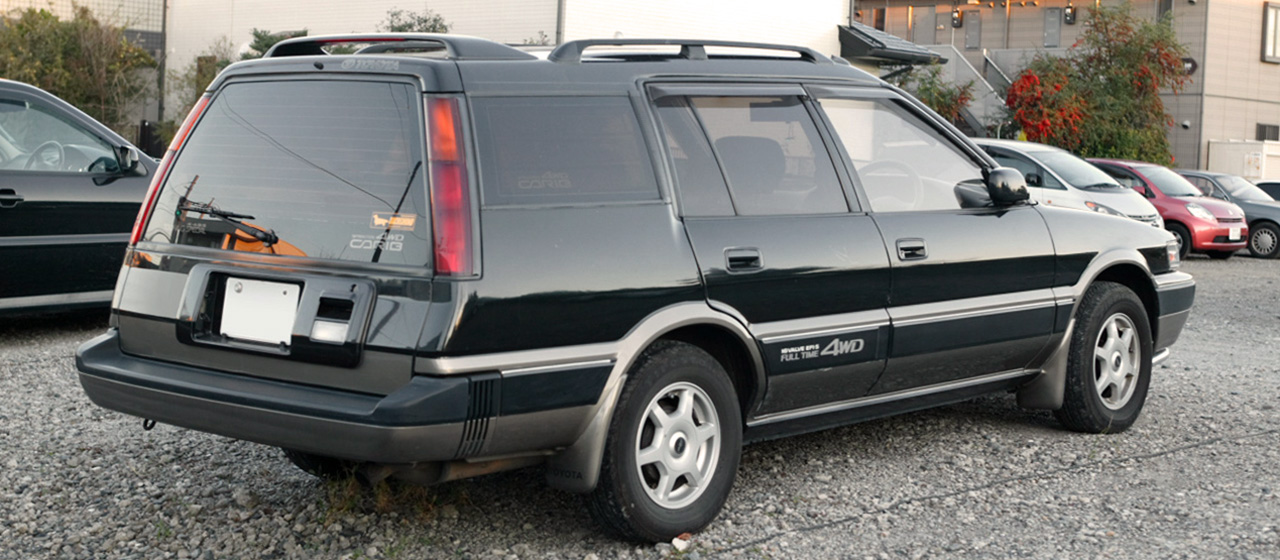
Rear view of Sprinter Carib AWD AV-II Touring Special (Japan)

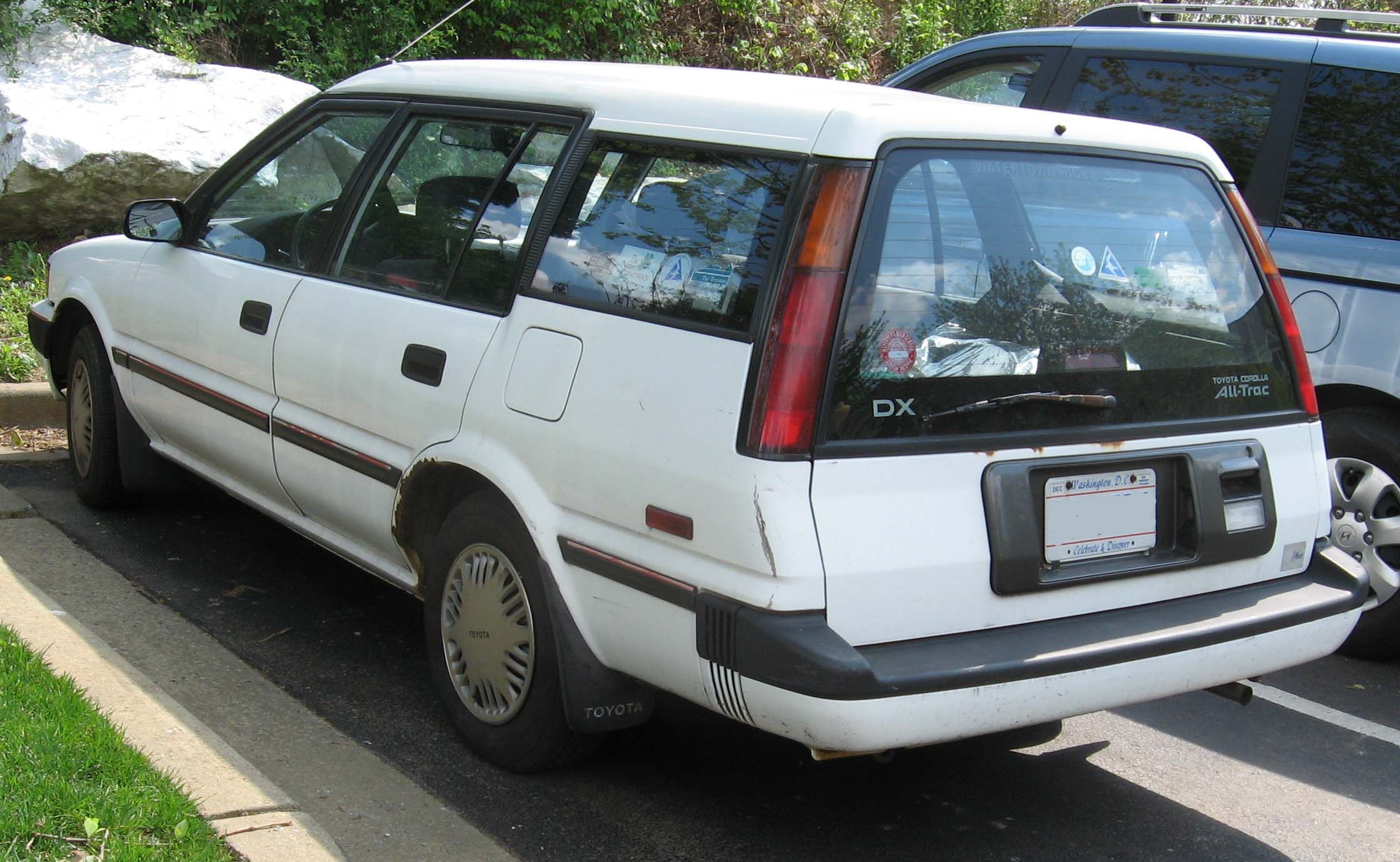
Rear view of Corolla All-Trac DX wagon (US)

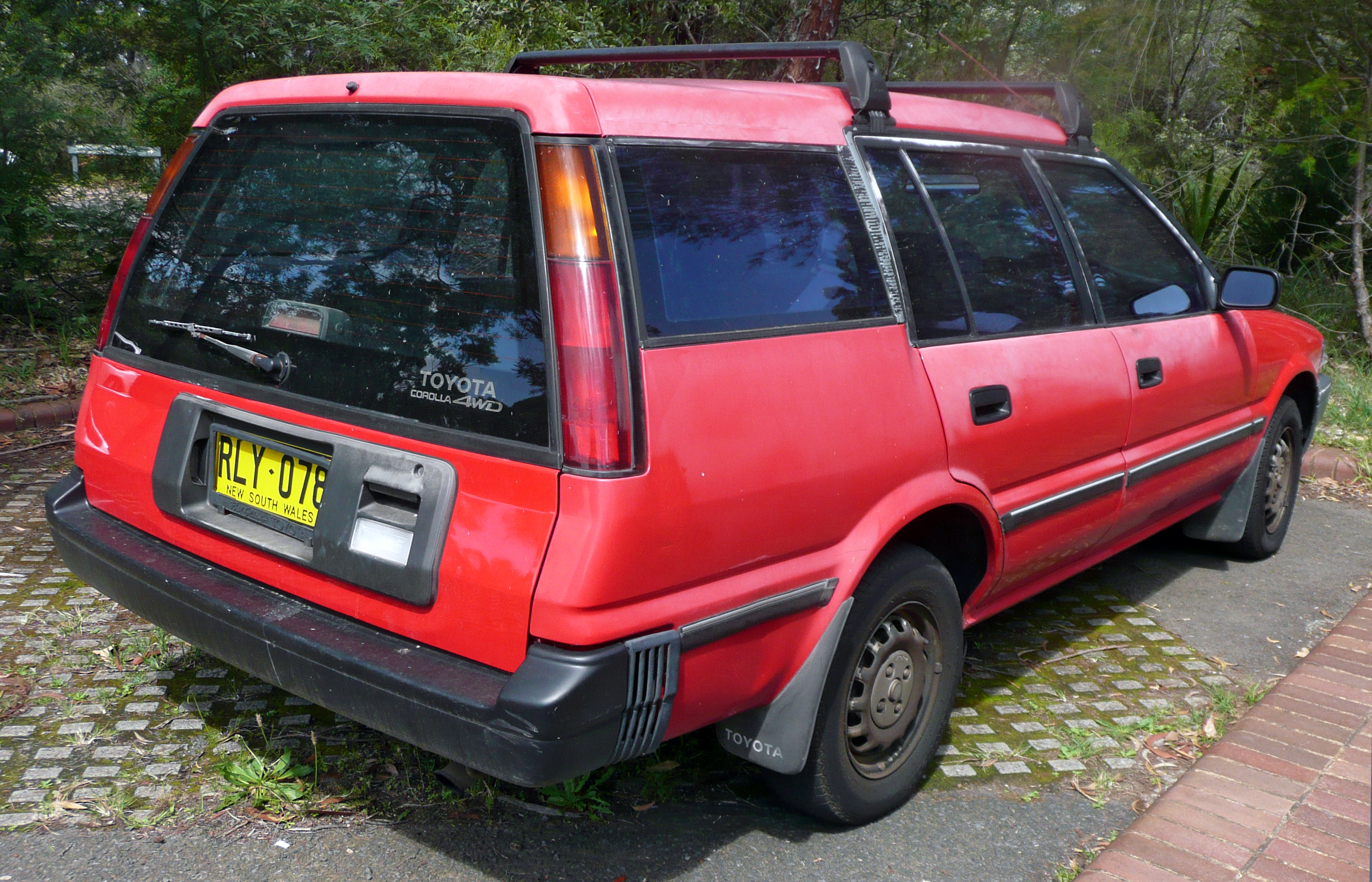
Rear view of Corolla 4WD XL wagon (Australia)

== Third generation (E110; 1995) ==
Third generation
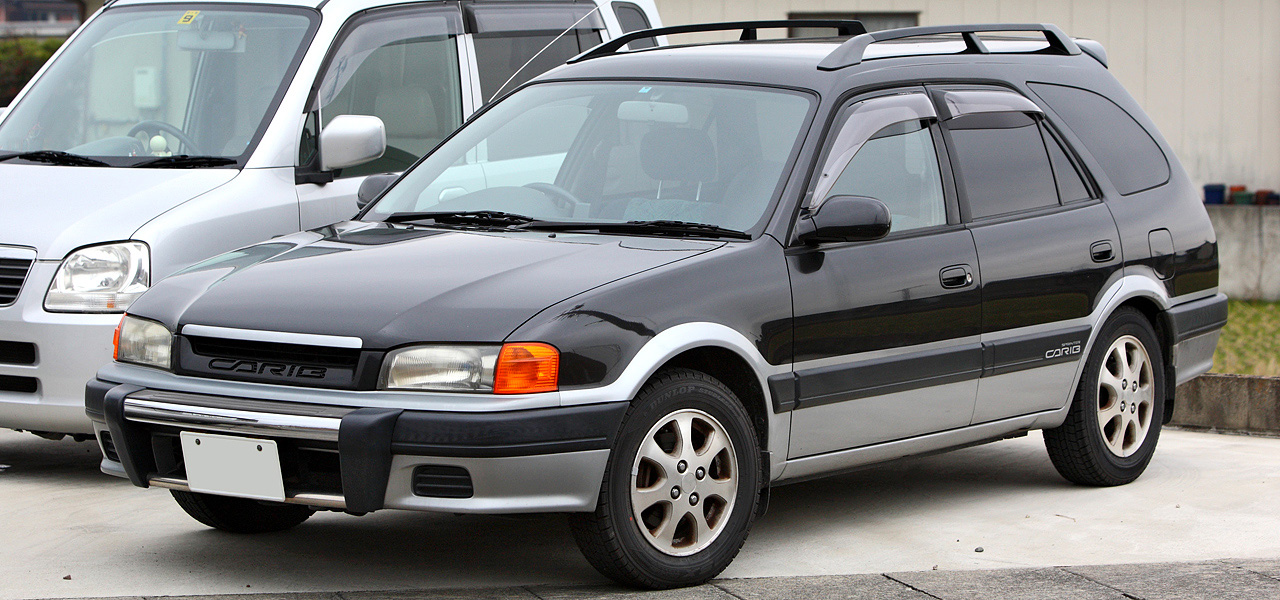
- Toyota Sprinter Carib 1.6 Z-Touring (AE111G, pre-facelift)

Overview
- Model code: E110
- Also called: Toyota Corolla wagon
- Production: 1995–2002

Body and chassis
- Related: Toyota Corolla (E110); Toyota Sprinter (E110); Toyota Corolla Levin/Sprinter Trueno (E110); Toyota Corolla Spacio (E110); Chevrolet Prizm (E110)

Powertrain
- Engine: 1.6 L 4A-FE I4 (AE111/114G); 1.6 L 4A-GE I4 (AE111G); 1.8 L 7A-FE I4 (AE115G)
- Transmission: 4-speed A241H/A245E/A246E automatic; 5-speed C50/E55F/E59F manual; 6-speed C160 manual

Dimensions
- Wheelbase: 2,430 mm (95.7 in)
- Length: 4,175–4,360 mm (164.4–171.7 in)
- Width: 1,695 mm (66.7 in)
- Height: 1,460–1,505 mm (57.5–59.3 in)
- Curb weight: 1,140–1,180 kg (2,513.3–2,601.5 lb)

The last generation Sprinter Carib was launched in August 1995 and exported as Corolla wagon with different front end to Europe in 1997. The Sprinter Carib was powered by 1.6–1.8 L A series engines, while the exported Corolla wagon got additional smaller 1.3 L 4E-FE petrol engine and a 2.0 L 2C-III diesel engine as option. In Japan, both engines were available with standard four-wheel drive system. While in Europe, the system was exclusive for the 1.8 L engine. The older E100 wagons continued for sale as Sprinter and Corolla passenger/commercial wagons in Japan, which were also available with four-wheel drive system.

In May 1996, the dual front airbags and ABS became standard equipment, additional front-wheel drive option for models with 1.6 L engines and a high performance "BZ Touring" trim powered by a 1.6 L 20-valve 4A-GE "black top" engine was added to the line up. Further improvements were occurred in April 1997 with a facelift, implementation of Toyota's GOA body structure technology and a new 6-speed manual transmission for the high performance BZ Touring trim. A year later, a unique model with the European Corolla wagon front end was introduced as Sprinter Carib Rosso and it was only available with a 1.6 L 4A-FE engine option.

The European market Corolla wagon received improvements in January 2000 with the implementation of Euro 3 compliant 1.3–1.6 L ZZ series VVT-i petrol engines, while the 1.8 L engine remained for the four-wheel drive model. The diesel engine was also replaced by a rebadged 1.9 L PSA's diesel engine and later by Toyota's 2.0 L 1CD-FTV D-4D turbodiesel engine in 2001. However, with the exception of 1.8 L engine, these more modern engines were never available for Sprinter Carib until its discontinuation in August 2002.

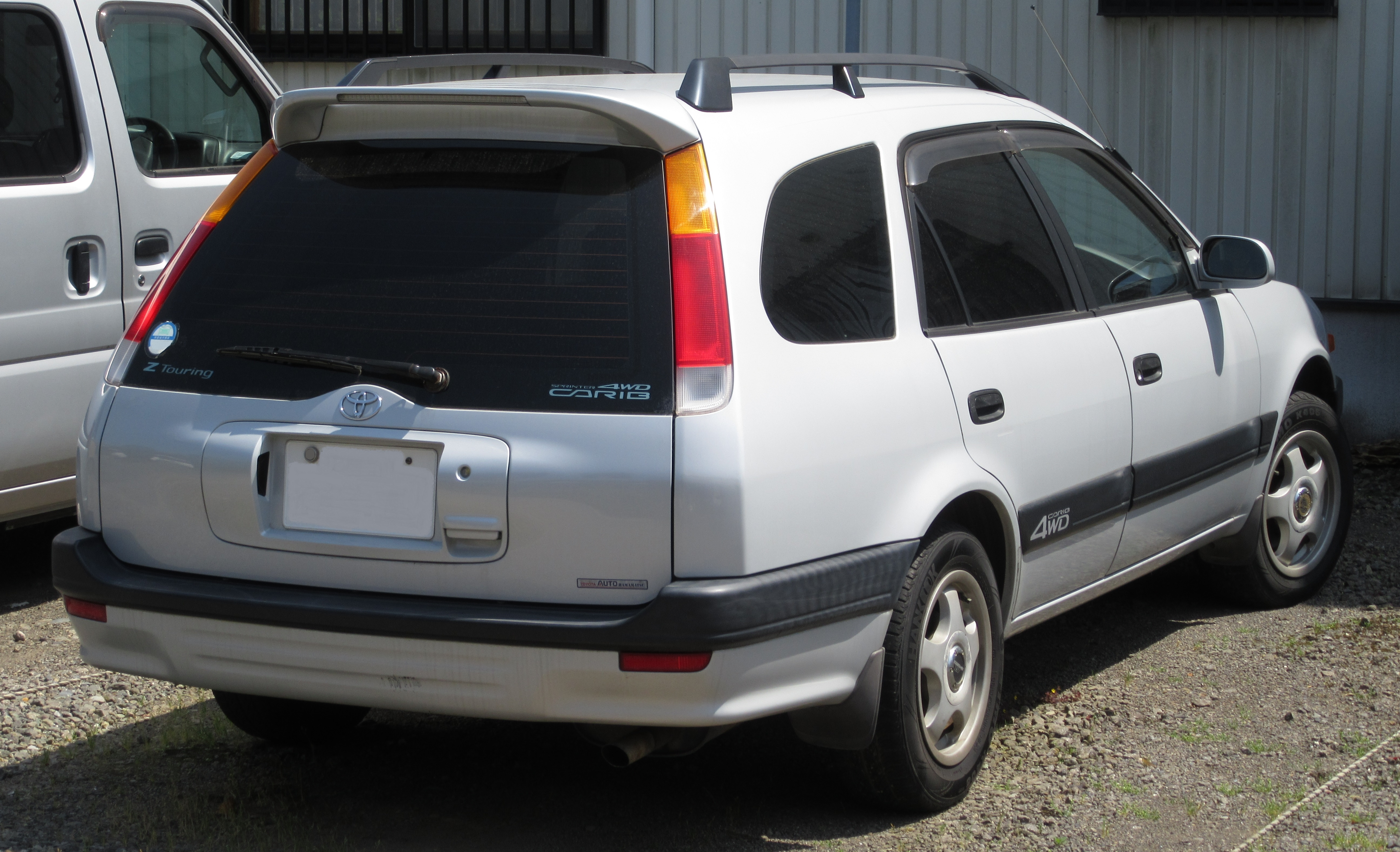
Rear view (pre-facelift)

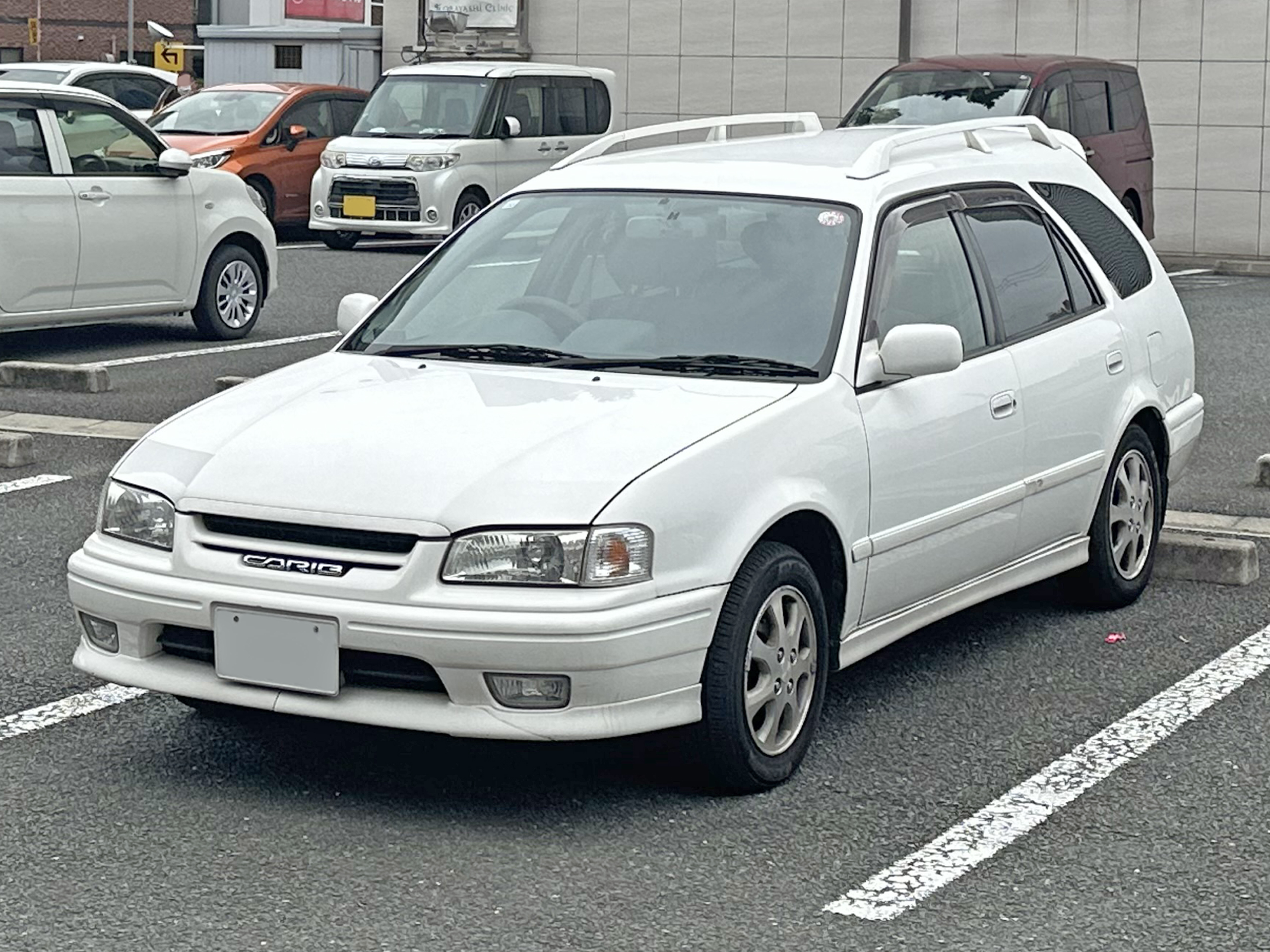
Sprinter Carib Z-Touring (facelift)

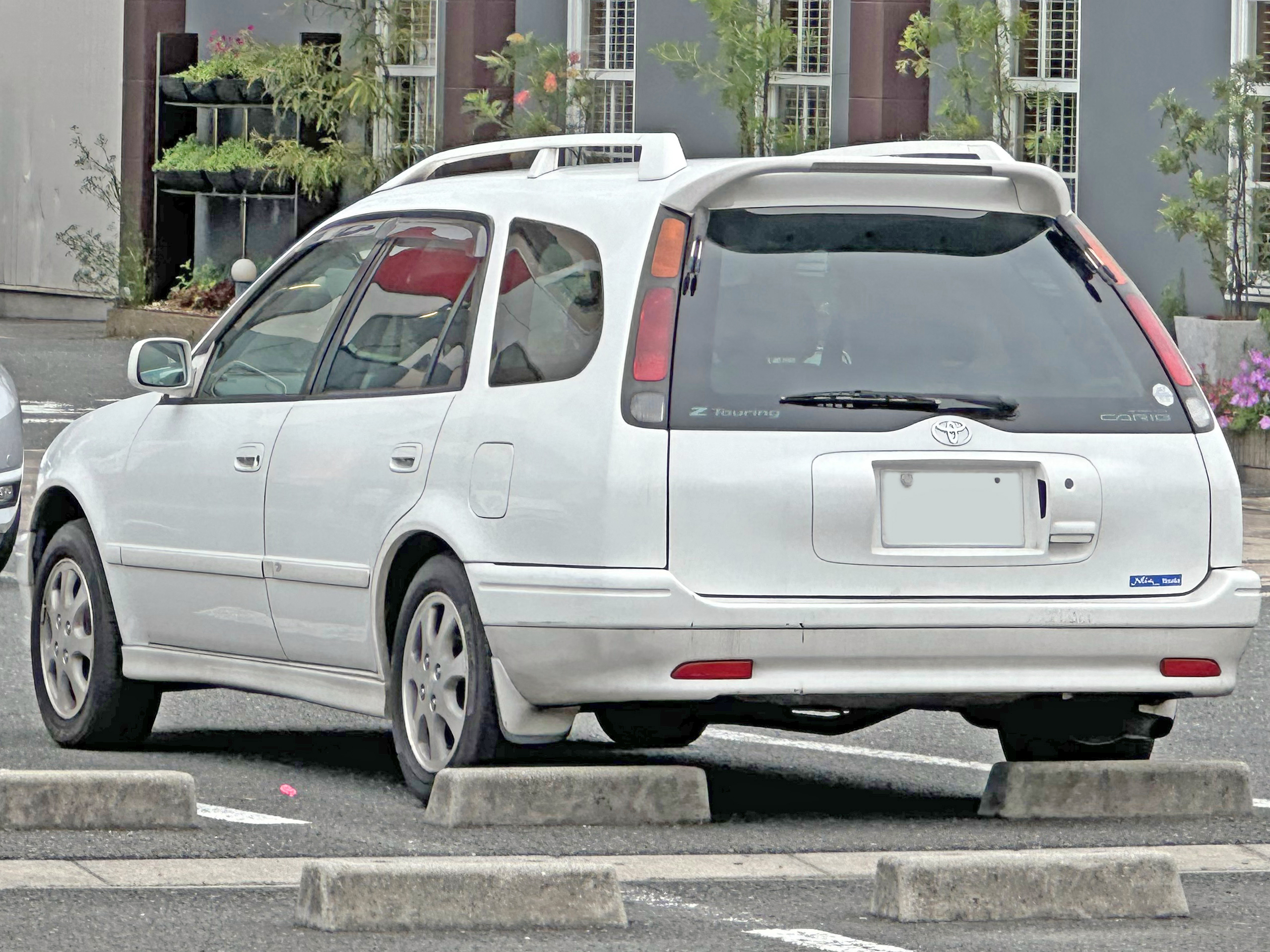
Rear view (facelift)

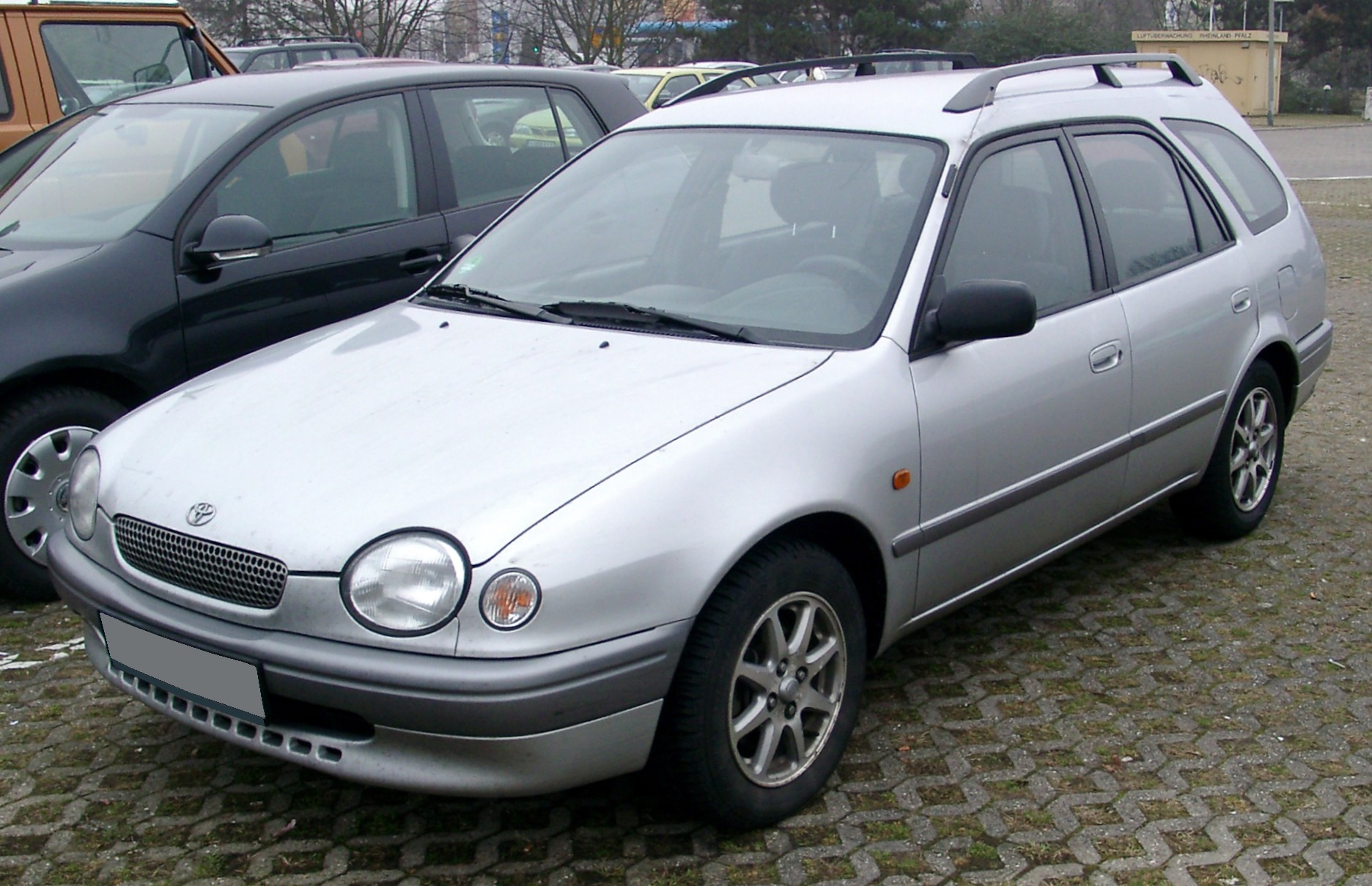
Pre-facelift European market Corolla wagon, sold as Sprinter Carib Rosso in Japan.
