= Toyota Corolla Spacio =

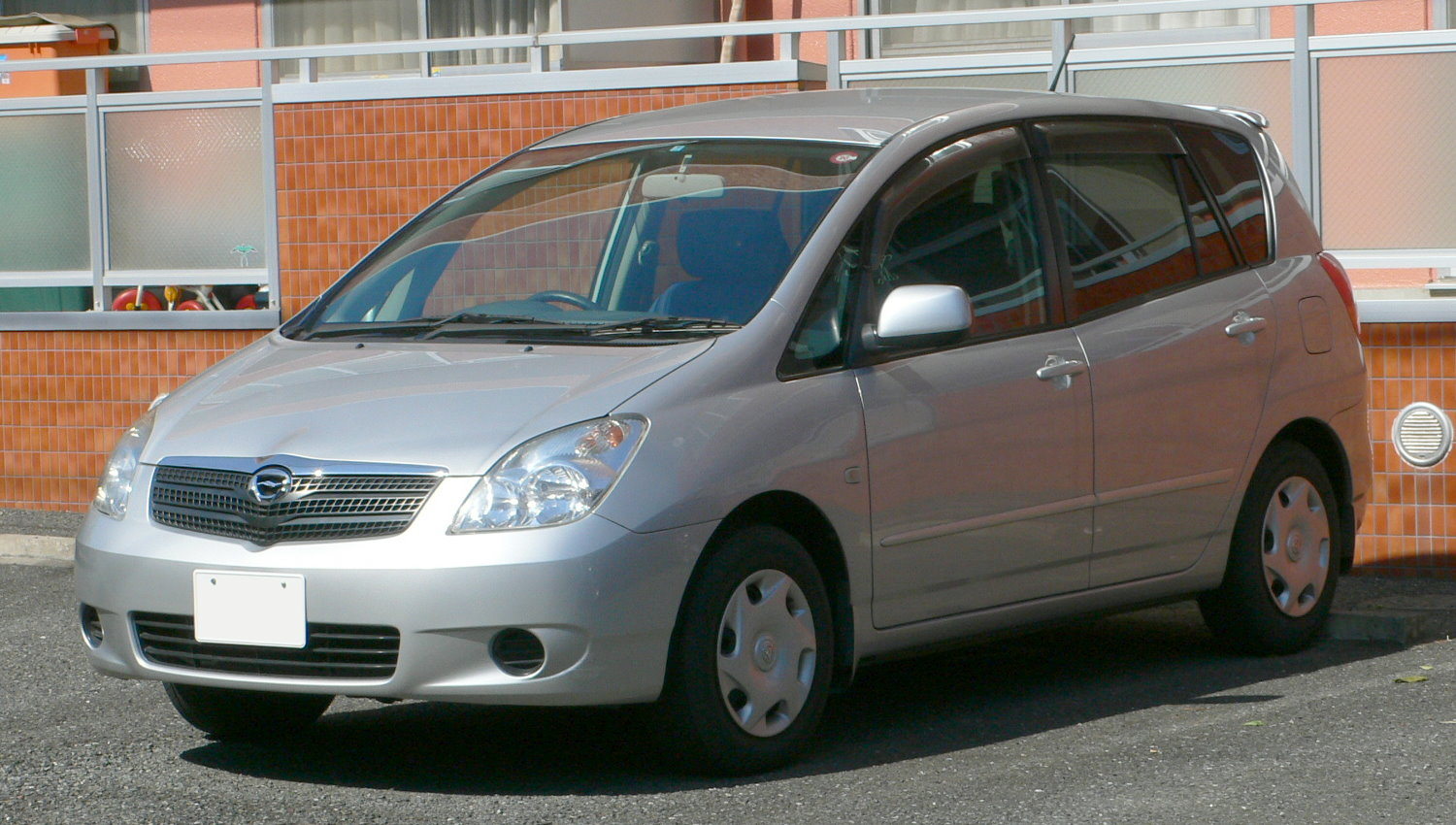
- Toyota Corolla Spacio X (E120)

Overview
- Manufacturer: Toyota
- Production: January 1997 – June 2007
- Assembly: Japan: Susono, Shizuoka (Kanto Auto Works)

Body and chassis
- Class: Compact MPV
- Body style: 5-door wagon
- Layout: Front-engine, front-wheel-drive; Front-engine, four-wheel drive

Chronology
- Successor: Toyota Corolla Rumion; Toyota Passo Sette

The Toyota Corolla Spacio is a compact MPV sold by Toyota under the Corolla nameplate. The "Spacio" nameplate was only used in Japan, where it was exclusive to Toyota Corolla Store dealerships. The second generation Corolla Spacio went on sale from 2001 in Europe, where it used the Corolla Verso nameplate instead.

The "Spacio" name is taken from the Italian word spazio, which means "space".

== First generation (E110; 1997) ==
First generation (E110)
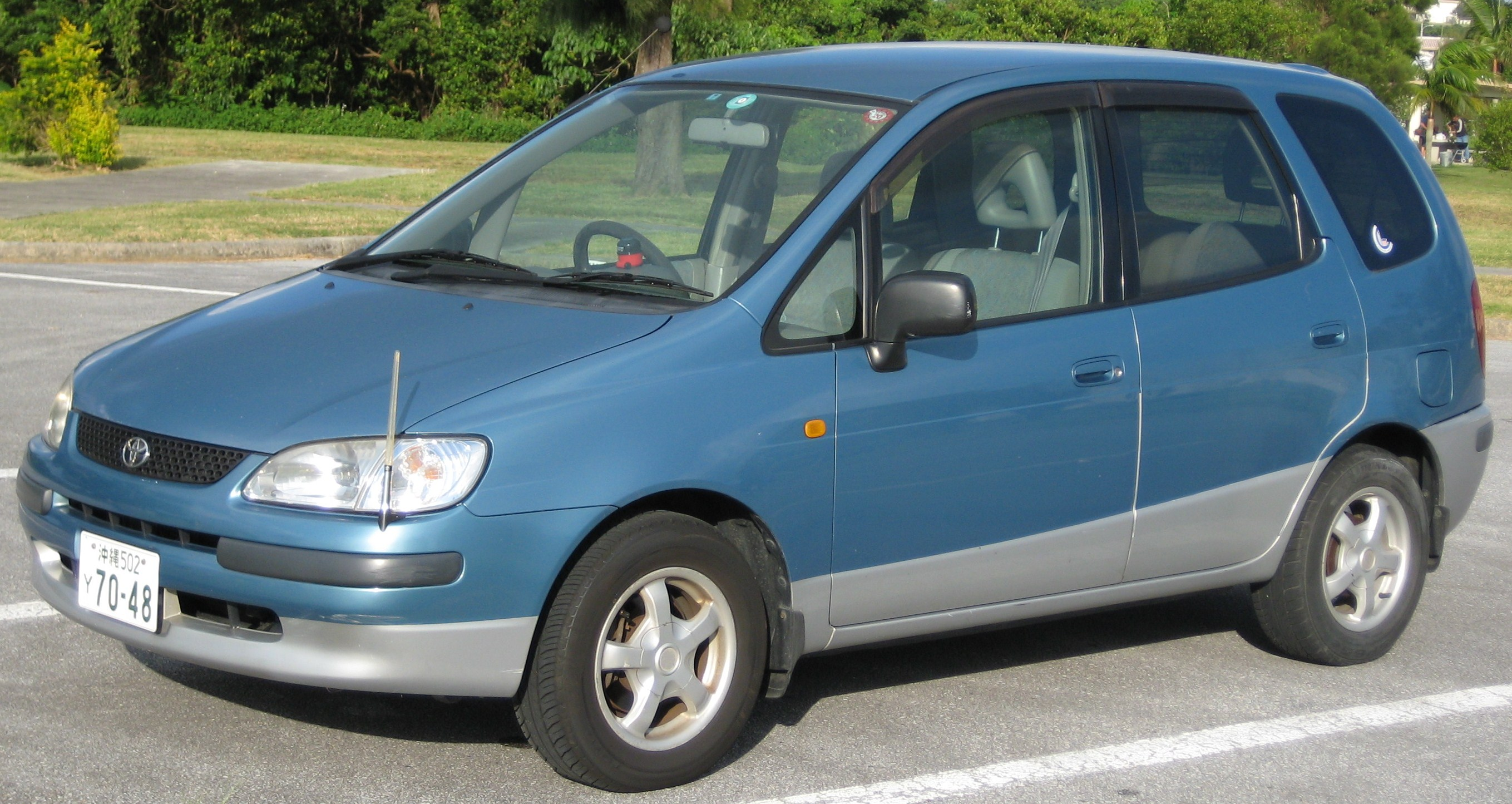
- Corolla Spacio (pre-facelift)

Overview
- Production: January 1997 – May 2001

Body and chassis
- Related: Toyota Corolla (E110)

Powertrain
- Engine: Petrol: 1.6 L 4A-FE I4; 1.8 L 7A-FE I4
- Transmission: 4-speed automatic

Dimensions
- Wheelbase: 2,465 mm (97.0 in)
- Length: 4,185–4,210 mm (164.8–165.7 in)
- Width: 1,695 mm (66.7 in)
- Height: 1,620–1,630 mm (63.8–64.2 in)

The first generation, introduced in January 1997, was introduced as a two box minivan which was technically similar to the Avensis. Its body panels were stamped by long time Toyota supplier Kanto Auto Works. The Spacio received a facelift in April 1999.

The first generation Corolla Spacio was available with 2-3, 2-0-2 and 2-2-2 seating options. The pre-facelift model was available in Standard, L Package, G Package and Black Sports Package grade levels. The facelift model was available in Standard, G Package and Aero Tourer grade levels. In September 1998 a special edition appeared in collaboration with children's clothing company Miki House; it received unique body colours, a special tartan seat upholstery, and various other, child-friendly extras such as anti-microbial material on areas like the door armrests and steering wheel. The grille was painted silver and so were the corner protector inserts, as well as the roof rails on cars that were so equipped.

In May 2000, the "White Pearl Limited" edition was released. Based on the Spacio 2-3 Standard grade 1.6-litre FF car and 1.8-litre 4WD car, the exclusive color Super White Pearl Mica is adopted for the exterior color and the exclusive color ivory is adopted for the interior color. In addition, the interior is specially equipped with plated side door handles, CD, cassette and audio with multi-electronic tuner.

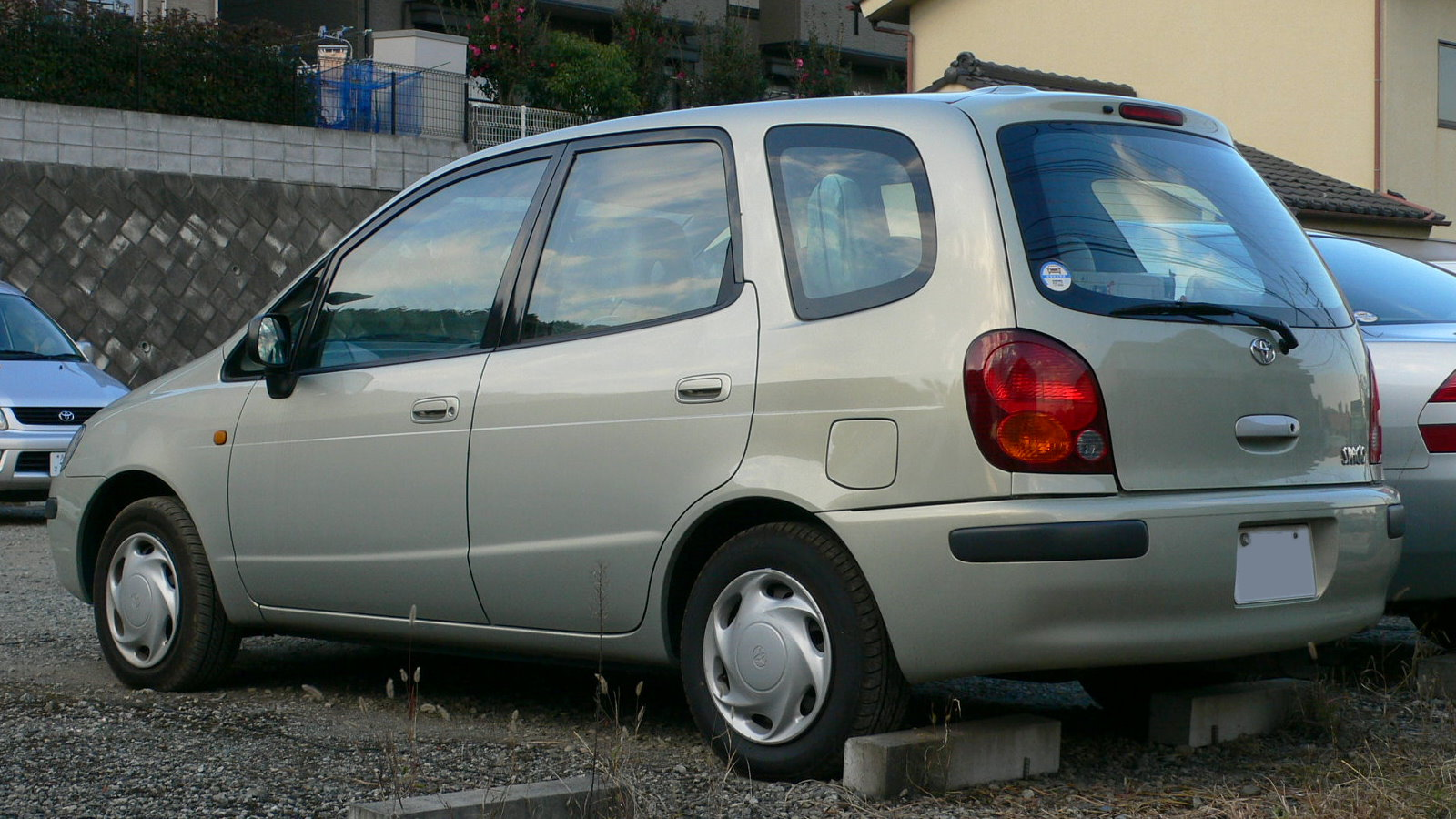
Corolla Spacio (pre-facelift)

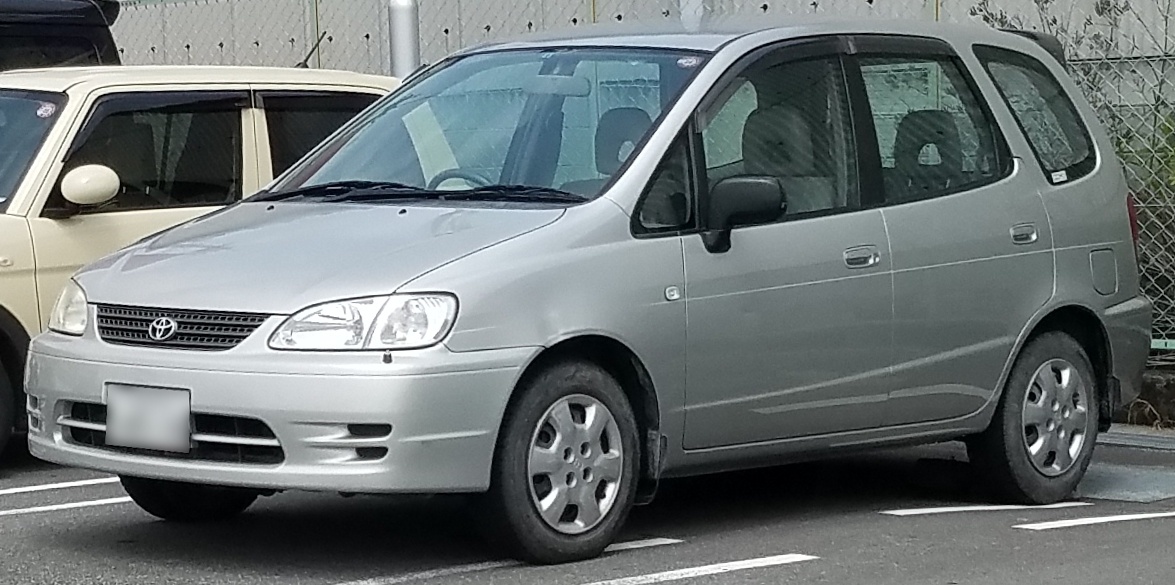
Corolla Spacio (facelift)

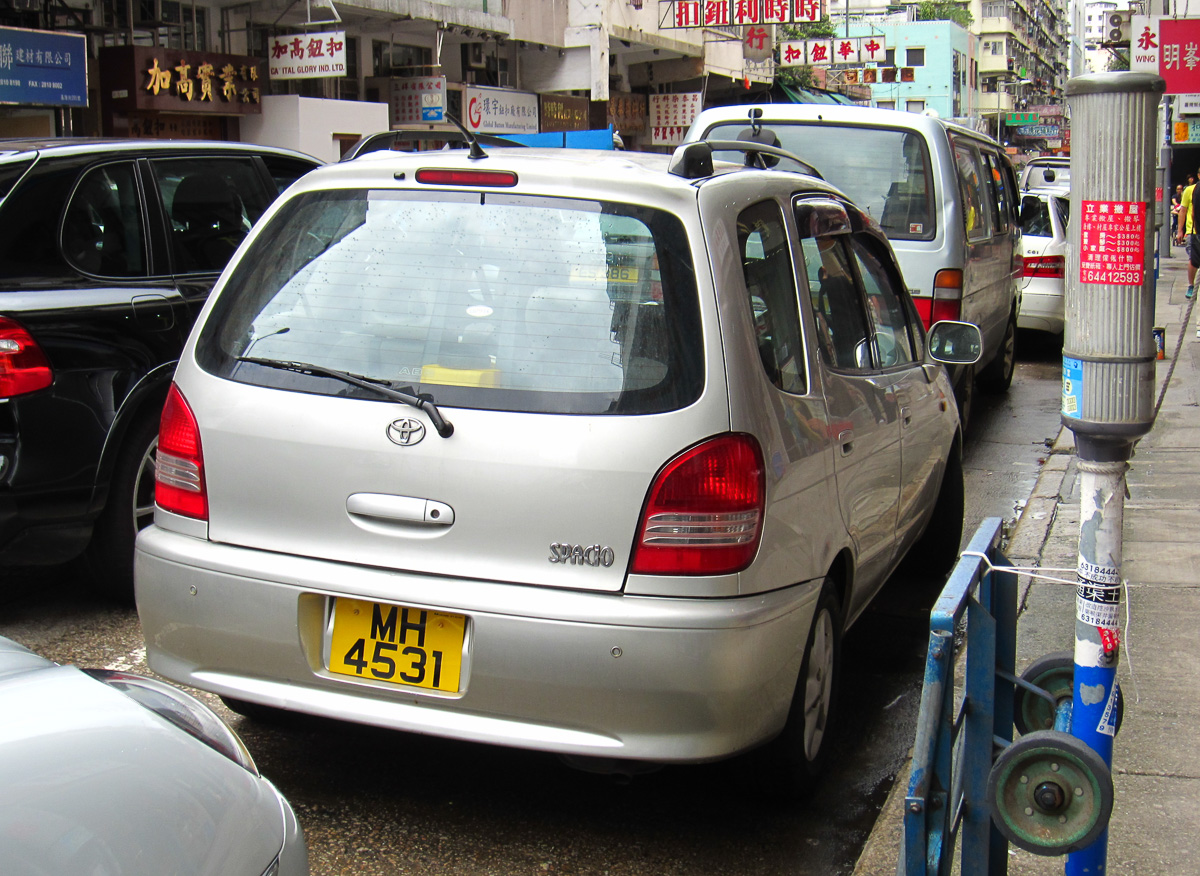
Corolla Spacio (facelift)

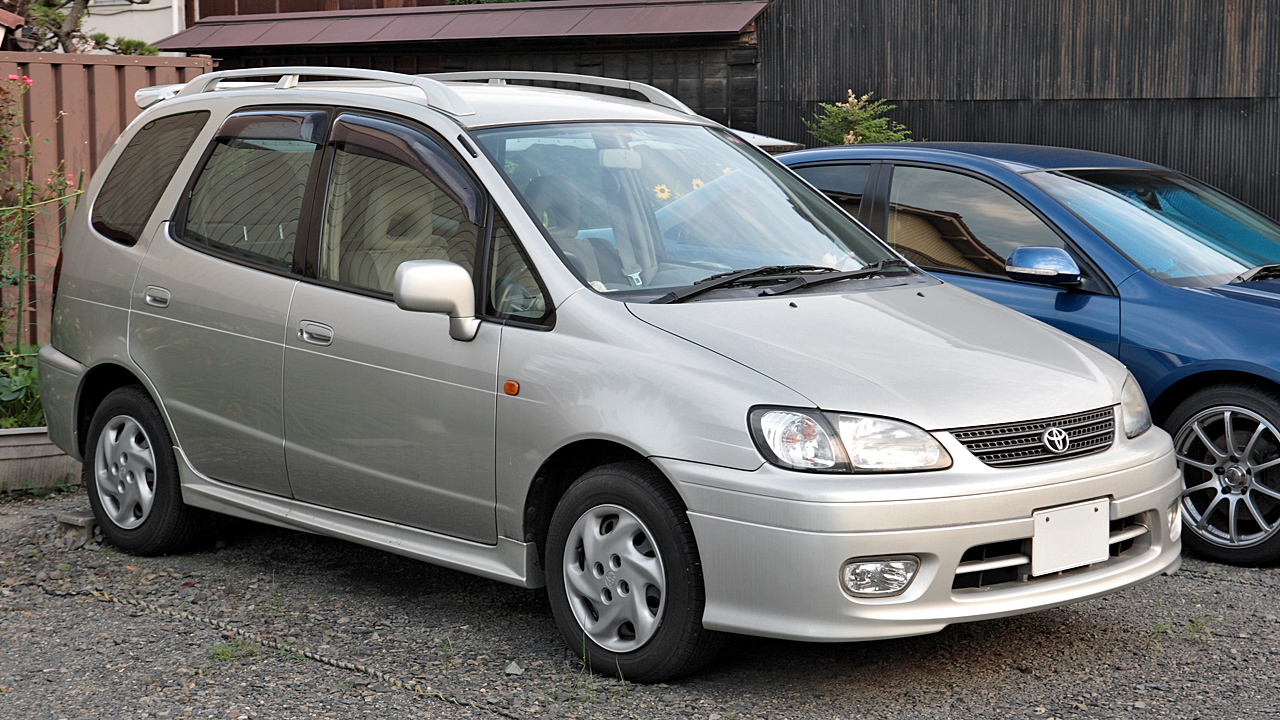
Corolla Spacio Aero Tourer (facelift)

== Second generation (E120; 2001) ==
Second generation (E120)
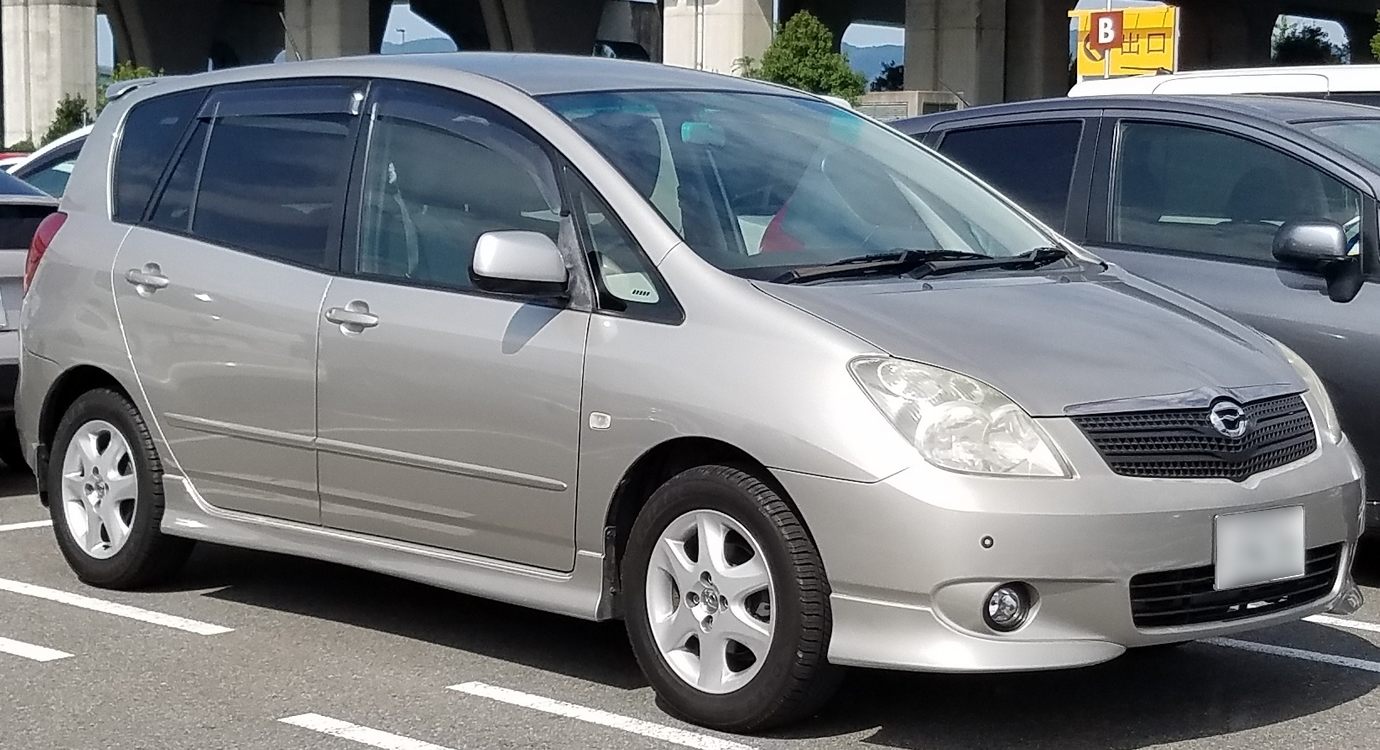
- Corolla Spacio S Aero Tourer (pre-facelift)

Overview
- Also called: Toyota Corolla Verso (Europe)
- Production: May 2001 – June 2007

Body and chassis
- Platform: Toyota MC platform
- Related: Toyota Corolla (E120)

Powertrain
- Engine: Petrol: 1.5 L 1NZ-FE VVT-i I4; 1.8 L 1ZZ-FE VVT-i I4
- Transmission: 4-speed automatic

Dimensions
- Wheelbase: 2,600 mm (102.4 in)
- Length: 4,260–4,275 mm (167.7–168.3 in)
- Width: 1,695 mm (66.7 in)
- Height: 1,610–1,620 mm (63.4–63.8 in)
- Curb weight: 1,190–1,320 kg (2,624–2,910 lb)

The second generation Corolla Spacio was released in Japan in May 2001. It was generally sleeker than the predecessor, lower and longer with a 135 mm (5.3 in) greater wheelbase. It entered the European market as the first generation Corolla Verso later in the same year after being shown at the September 2001 Frankfurt Motor Show. The Spacio received a facelift in April 2003 for the Japanese market. The layout was called a "5+2" by Toyota; five standard seats with a folding, emergency "Flex Bench" for two additional passengers in the rear.

Squeezed by the new, lower priced Sienta and the larger Wish, the Corolla Spacio was discontinued in Japan in June 2007. It was replaced by both the Corolla Rumion (5-seater) and Passo Sette (7-seater).

=== Markets ===
==== Japan ====
The second generation Corolla Spacio was available in V, X and X "G-Edition" grade levels with either 1.5-litre 1NZ-FE or 1.8-litre 1ZZ-FE petrol engine option, as well as S Aero Tourer grade with only 1.8-litre petrol engine option offered. The four-wheel drive option was only available for 1.8-litre petrol engine option. Only 4-speed automatic transmission option was offered for the Japanese market. The V grade was dropped for the facelifted model.

The Japanese market Corolla Spacio has a third row seat that can be folded for storage space.

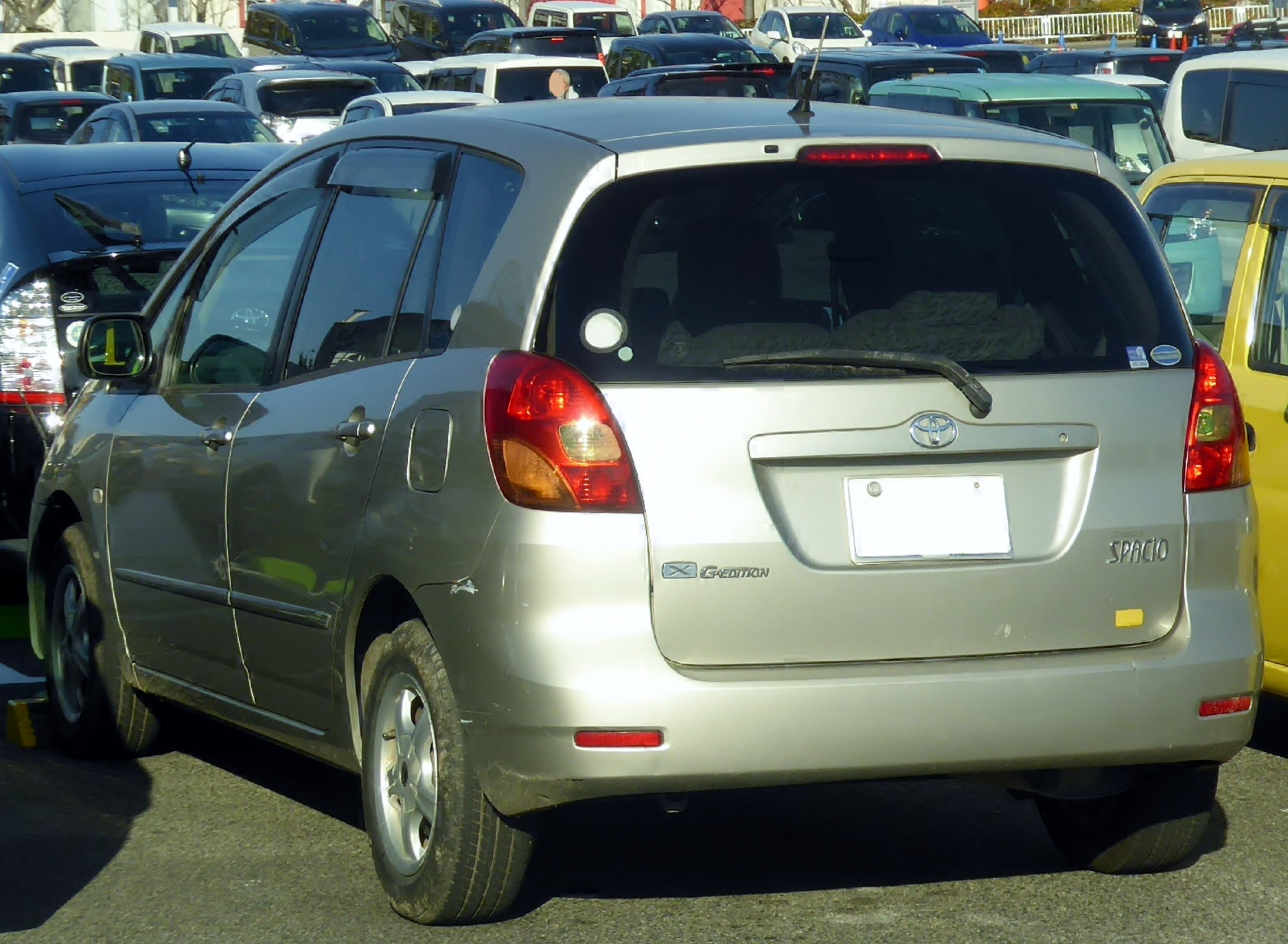
Corolla Spacio X "G-Edition" (pre-facelift)

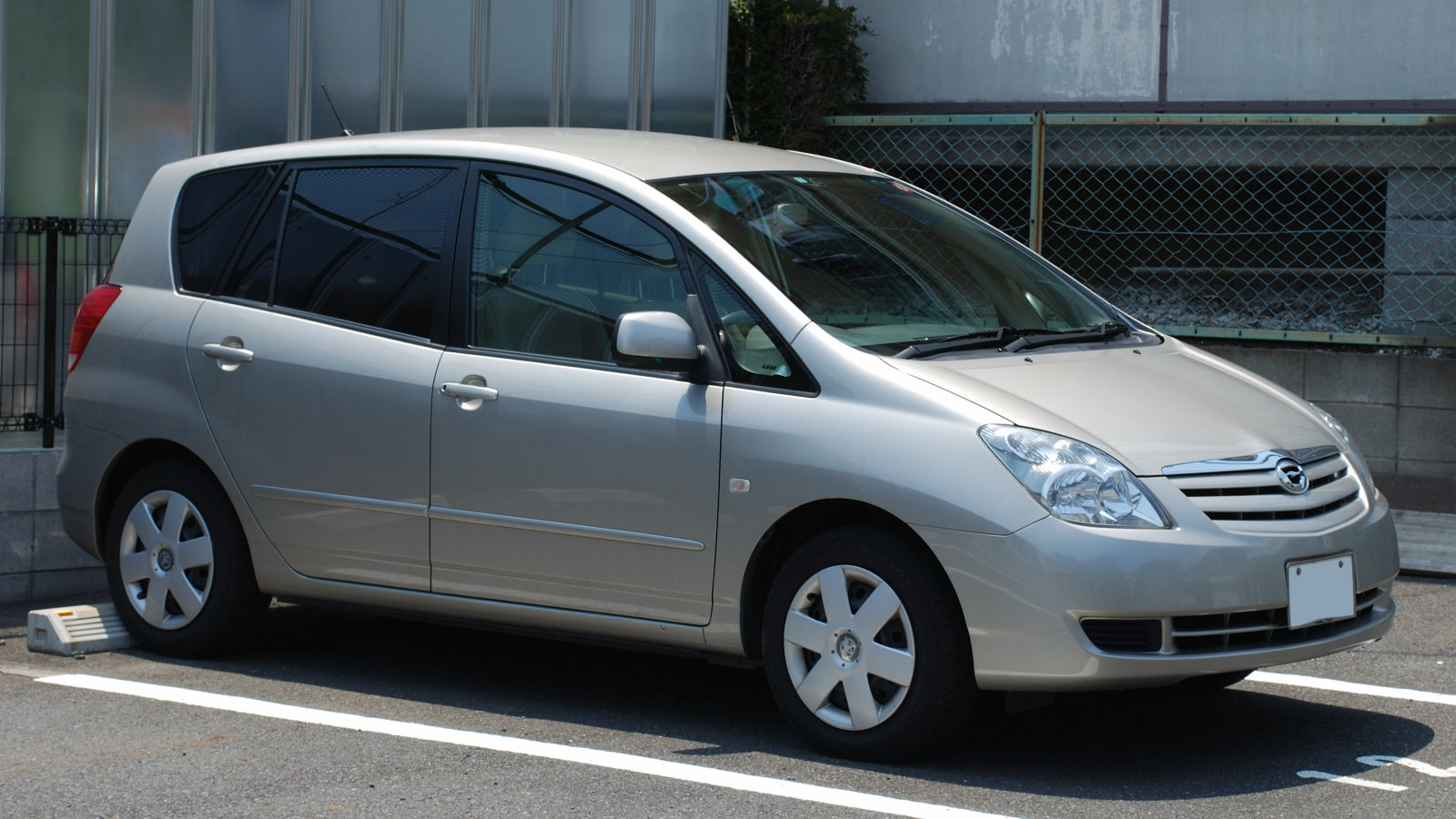
Corolla Spacio X (facelift)

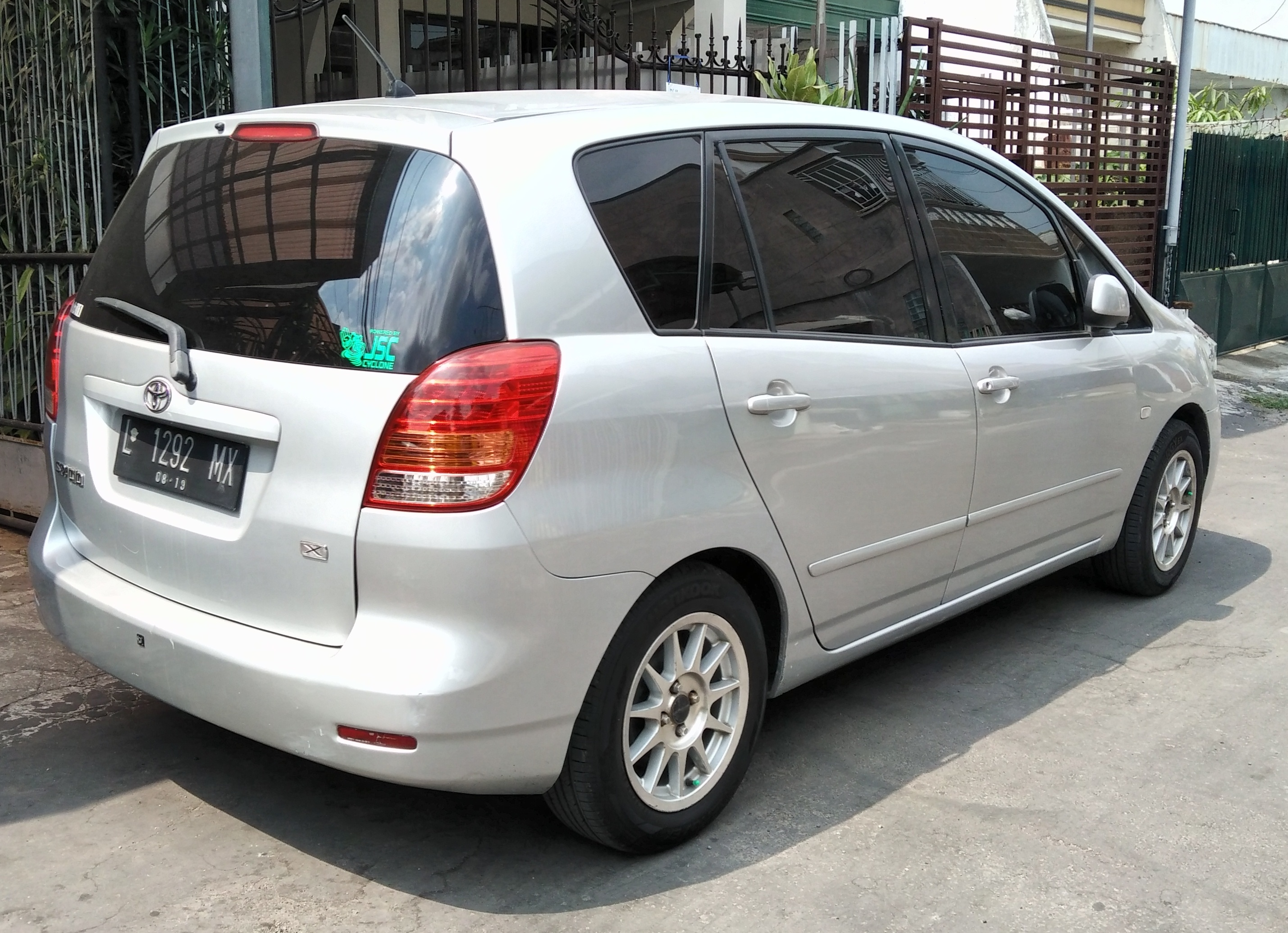
Corolla Spacio X (facelift)

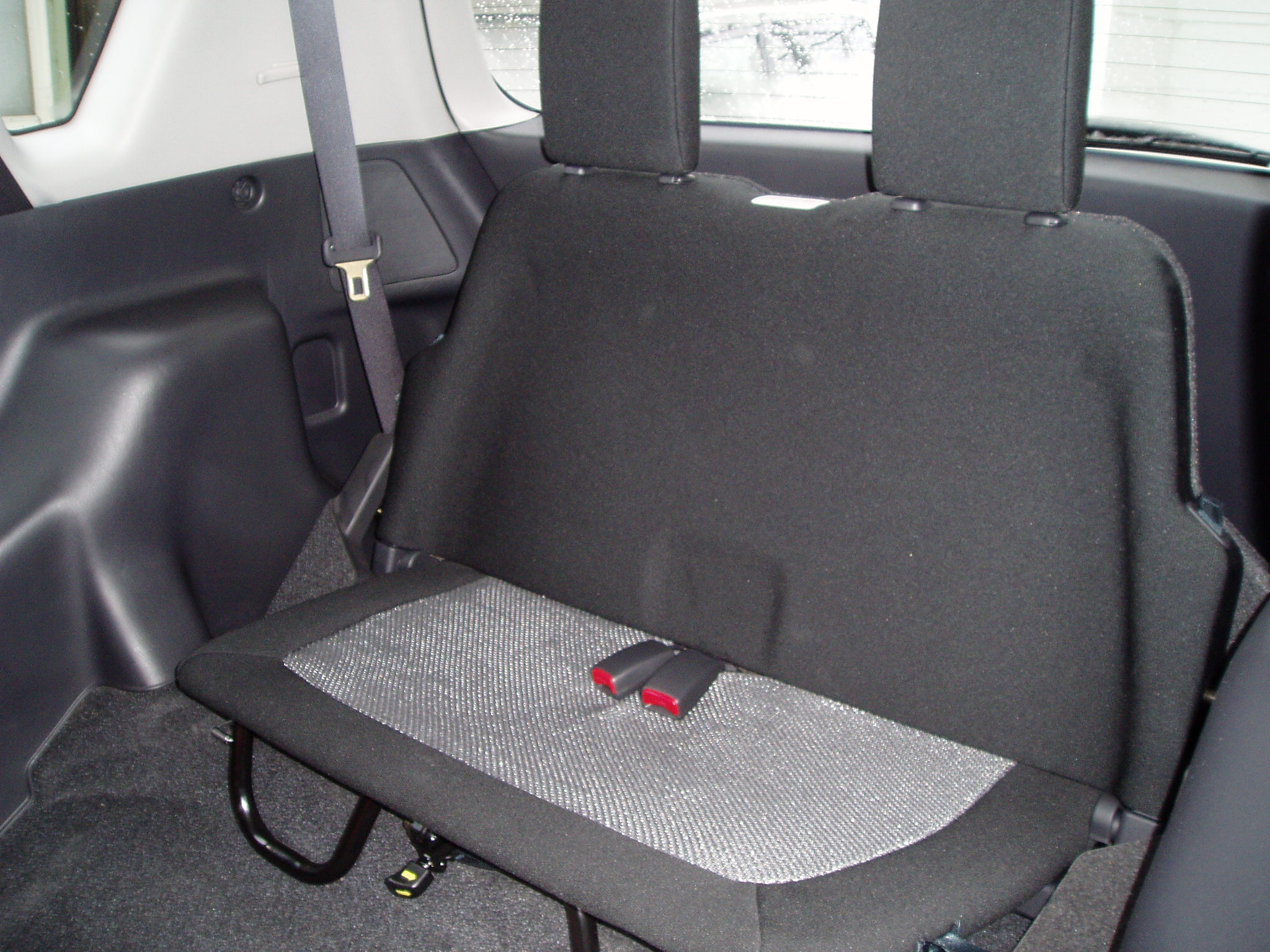
Third row seat

==== Europe ====
The Corolla Verso went on sale in Europe in late 2001, it was only available as a five-seater but also offered a five-speed manual and a diesel engine. In 2004, it was discontinued in favor of the second generation Corolla Verso, a locally developed model which was not sold in Japan.
