= Toyota Corolla (E110) =

Eighth generation of Toyota Corolla

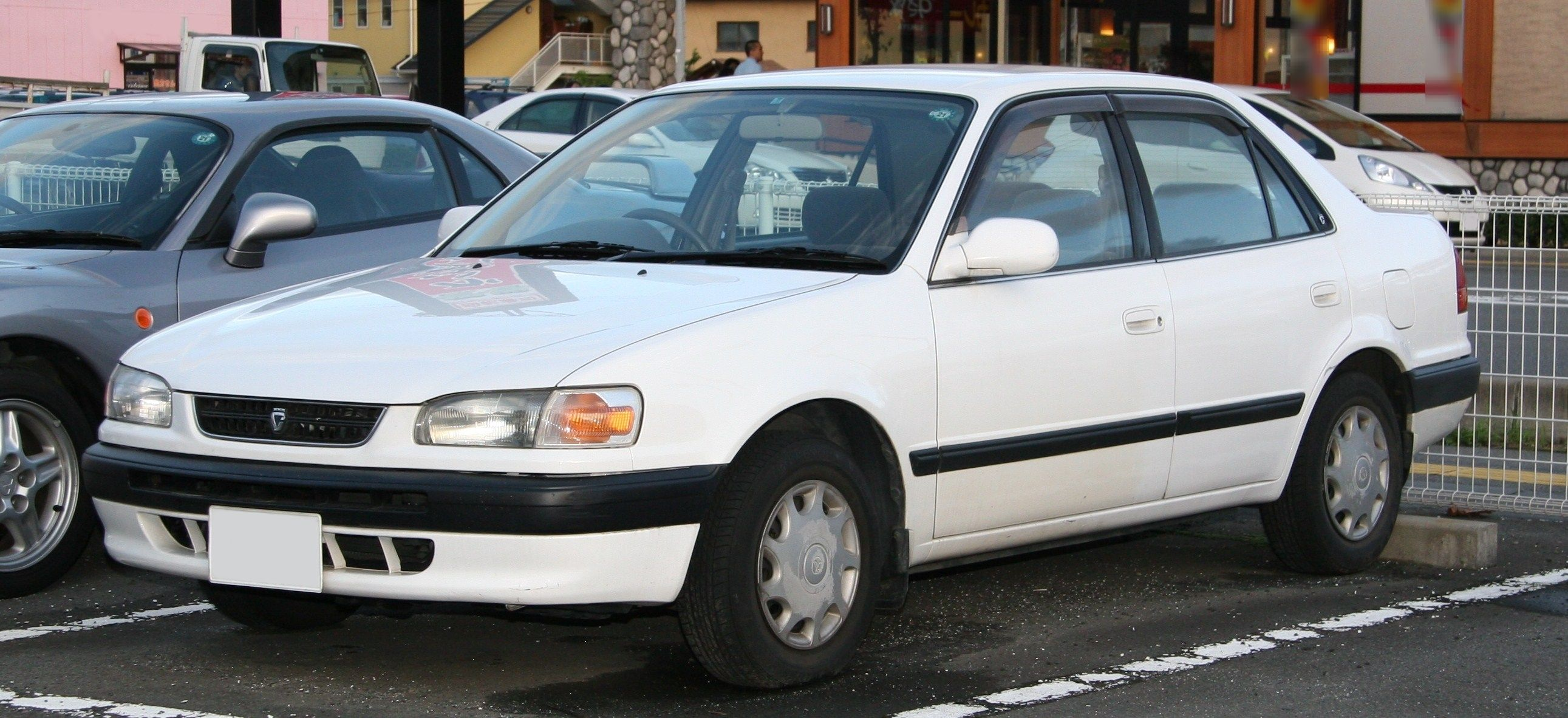

Overview
- Manufacturer: Toyota
- Model code: E110
- Also called: Toyota Sprinter; Toyota Sprinter Carib; Chevrolet Prizm
- Production: May 1995 – March 2000 (Japan); December 1997 – May 2002 (European, African, Asian and American countries)
- Model years: 1995–2002
- Assembly: Japan: Toyota City, Aichi (JDM and coupé models); Brazil: Indaiatuba; Canada: Cambridge, Ontario (TMMC); Indonesia: North Jakarta; Malaysia: Shah Alam; Philippines: Santa Rosa (TMP); South Africa: Durban; Thailand: Chachoengsao; Turkey: Arifiye, Sakarya Province (TMMT, Europe sedan models); United States: Fremont, California (NUMMI); United Kingdom: Burnaston (TMUK, hatchback, liftback, and station Wagon models); Vietnam: Vĩnh Phúc (CKD)
- Designer: Takayasu Honda (1992)

Body and chassis
- Class: Compact car (C)
- Body style: 4-door sedan; 2-door coupé (Japan); 3-door hatchback; 5-door liftback; 5-door station wagon (Note: All measurements, weights and engine and body style data refer mainly to Japanese, European and Oceania specification vehicles)
- Layout: Front-engine, front-wheel-drive; Front-engine, four-wheel-drive
- Related: Toyota Corolla Spacio (E110)

Powertrain
- Engine: Gasoline: 1,295 cc 2E I4 (EE110); 1,331 cc 4E-FE I4 (EE111); 1,398 cc 4ZZ-FE VVT-i I4 (ZZE111); 1,498 cc 5A-FE I4 (AE110); 1,587 cc 4A-FE/4A-GE I4 (AE111/114); 1,598 cc 3ZZ-FE VVT-i I4 (ZZE112); 1,762 cc 7A-FE I4 (AE112/115); 1,794 cc 1ZZ-FE VVT-i I4 (ZZE110); Diesel: 1,868 cc 1WZ turbo I4 (WZE110); 1,974 cc 2C-III I4 (CE110/114); 1,995 cc 1CD-FTV D-4D turbo I4 (CDE110); 2,184 cc 3C-E I4 (CE113/116)
- Transmission: 5/6-speed manual; 3/4-speed automatic

Dimensions
- Wheelbase: 2,465 mm (97.0 in)
- Length: Hatchback: 4,120 mm (162.2 in); Liftback: 4,270 mm (168.1 in); Sedan: 4,315 mm (169.9 in); Station wagon: 4,340 mm (170.9 in)
- Width: 1,690 mm (66.5 in)
- Height: Hatchback, liftback, sedan: 1,380 mm (54.3 in); Wagon: 1,445 mm (56.9 in)
- Curb weight: 1,095 kg (2,414 lb)

Chronology
- Predecessor: Toyota Corolla (E100)
- Successor: Toyota Corolla (E120); Toyota Vios (Philippines, Vietnam)

The Corolla E110 was the eighth generation of cars sold by Toyota under the Corolla nameplate.

Introduced in May 1995, the eighth generation shared its platform (and doors, on some models) with its predecessor. Due to the Lost Decades recession at the time, Toyota ordered Corolla development chief Takayasu Honda to cut costs, hence the carry-over engineering.

For the general market, the Corolla was offered in Base, XLi, GLi and SE-G trim levels.

== Japan ==
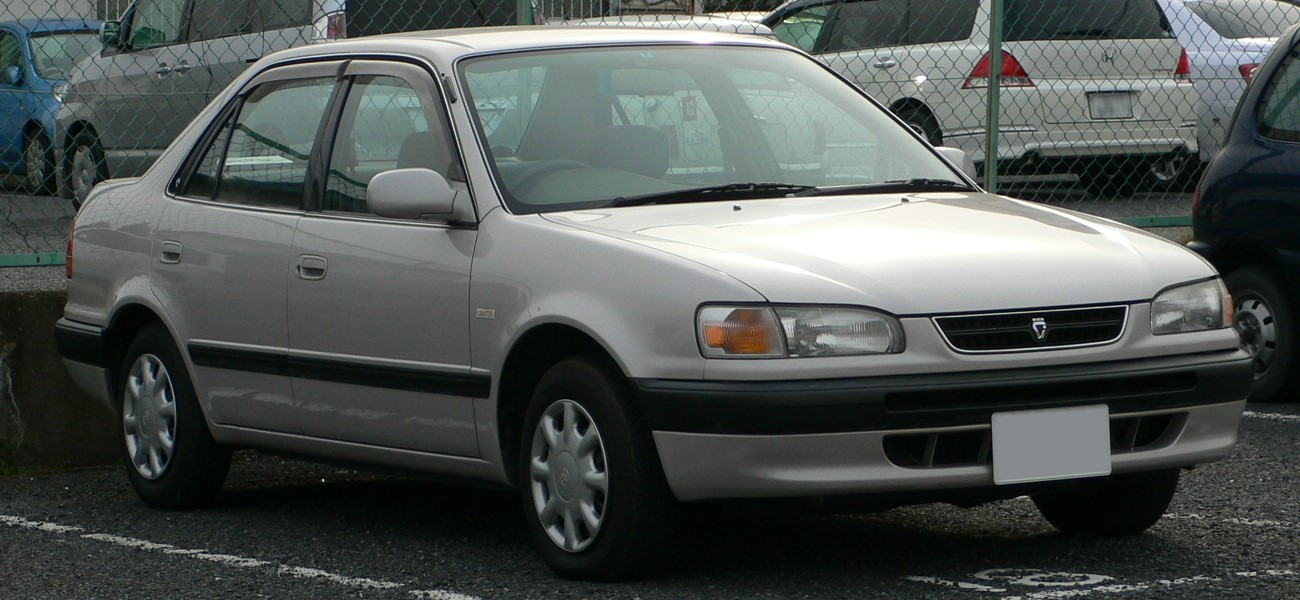

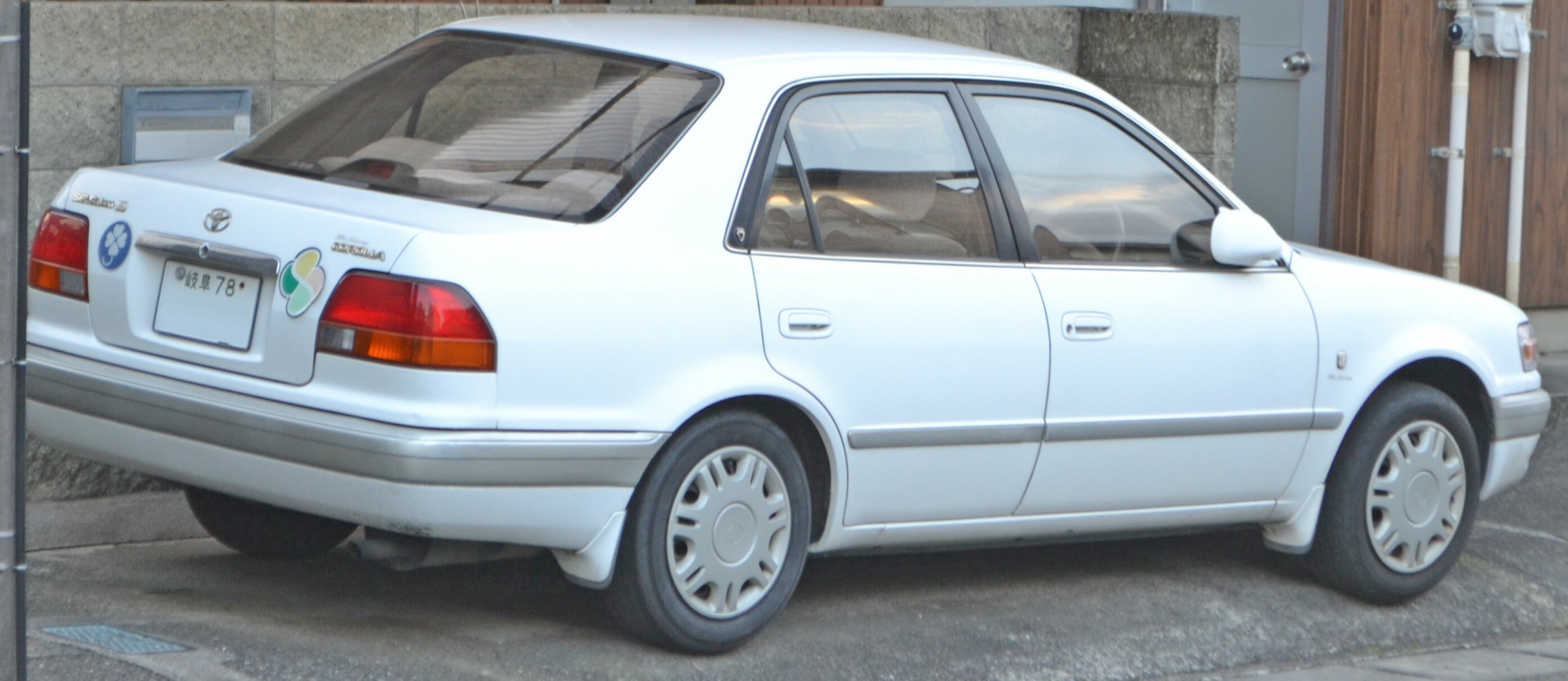
1995–1997 Corolla sedan (Japan)

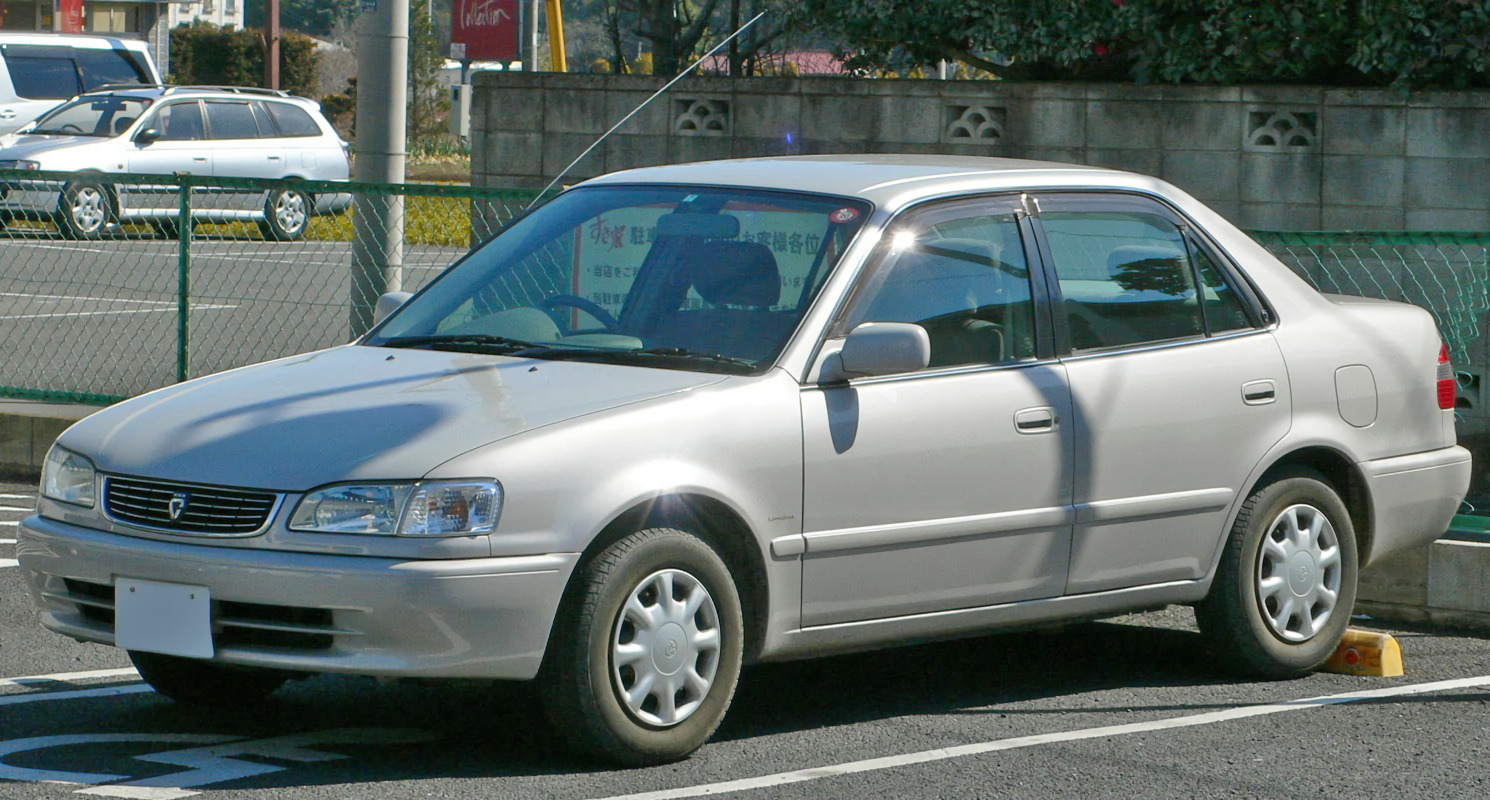

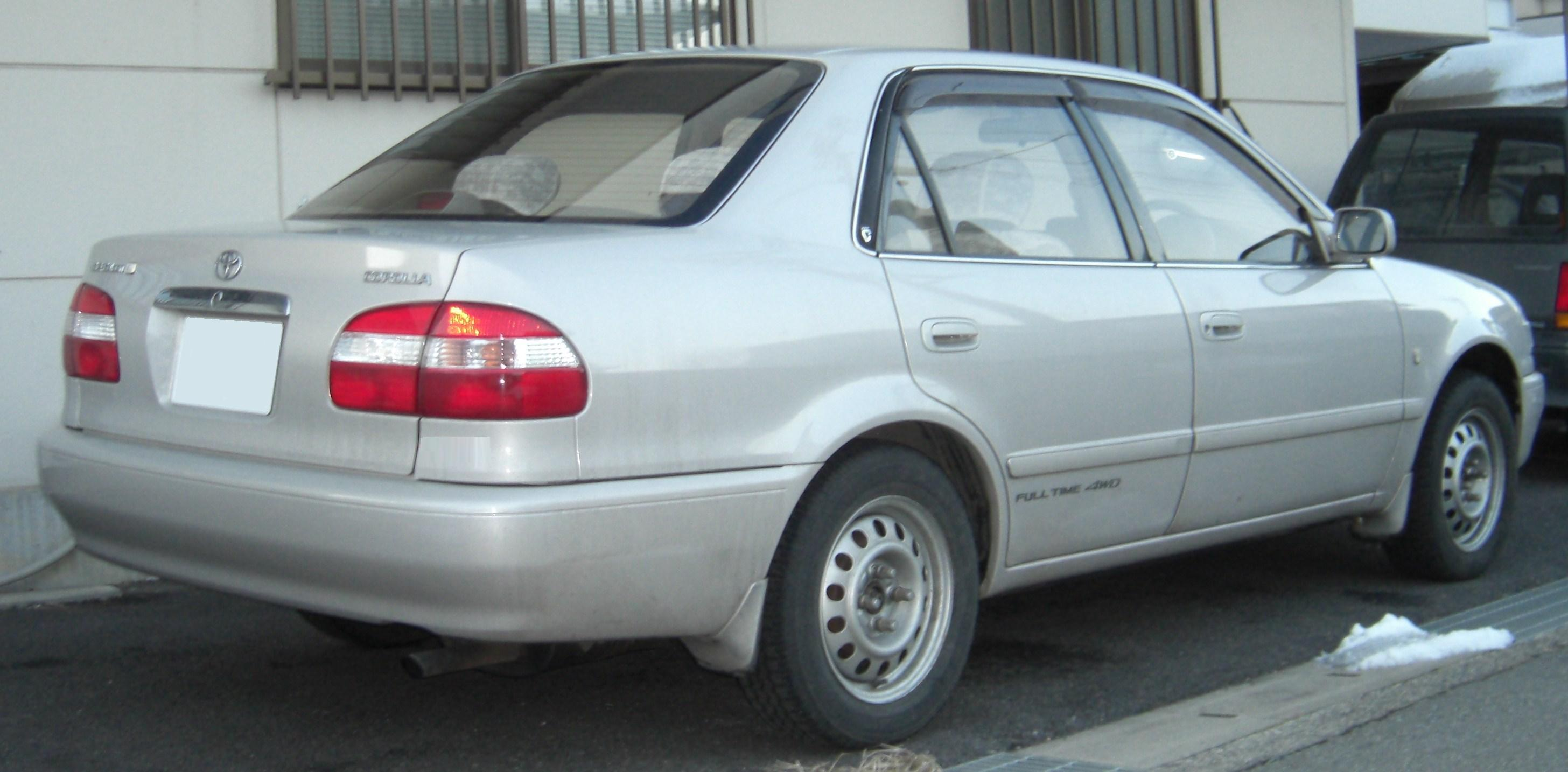
1997–2000 Corolla sedan (Japan)

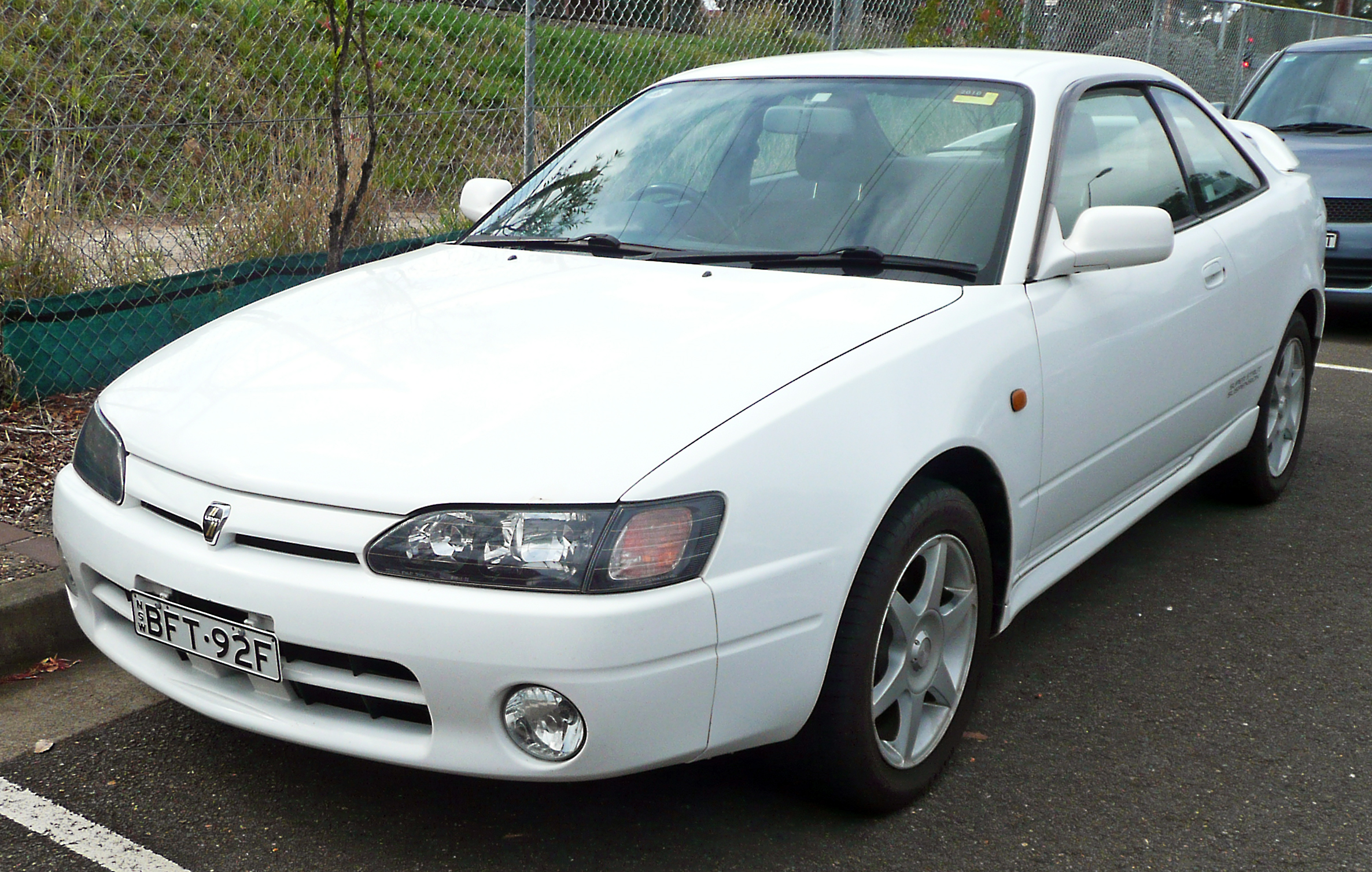

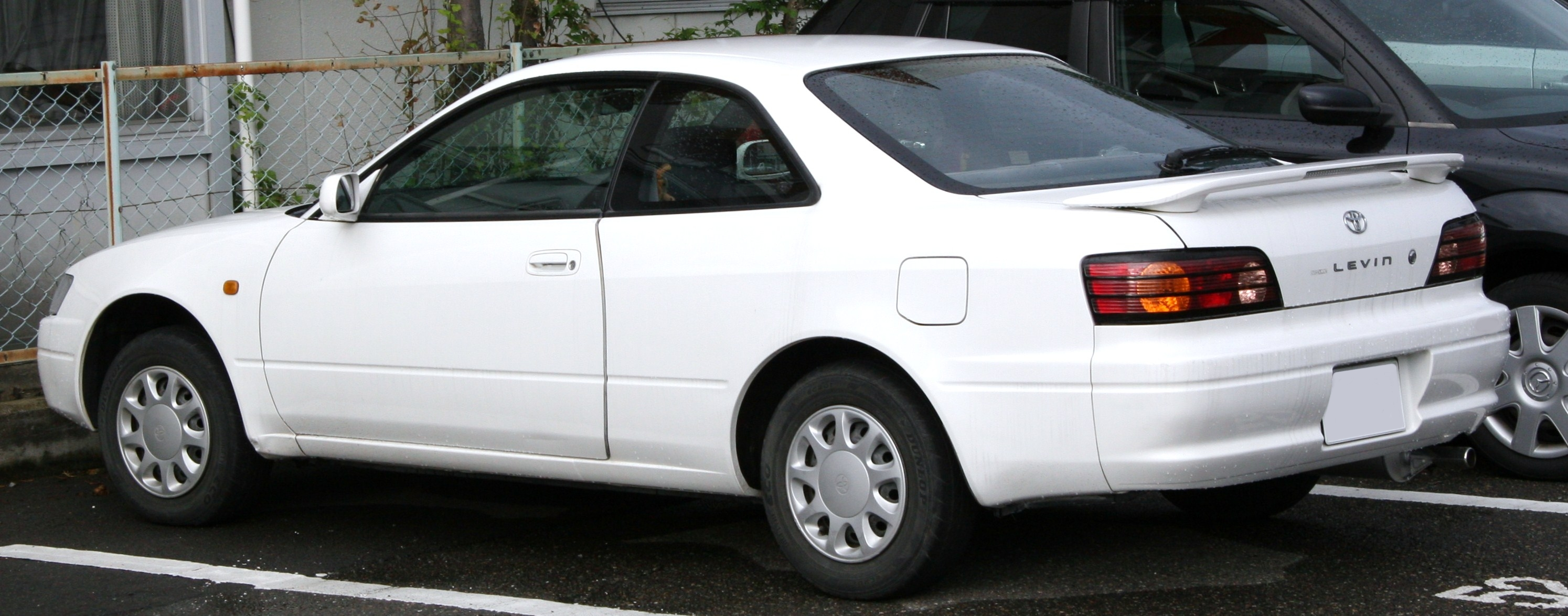
1997-2000 Corolla Levin

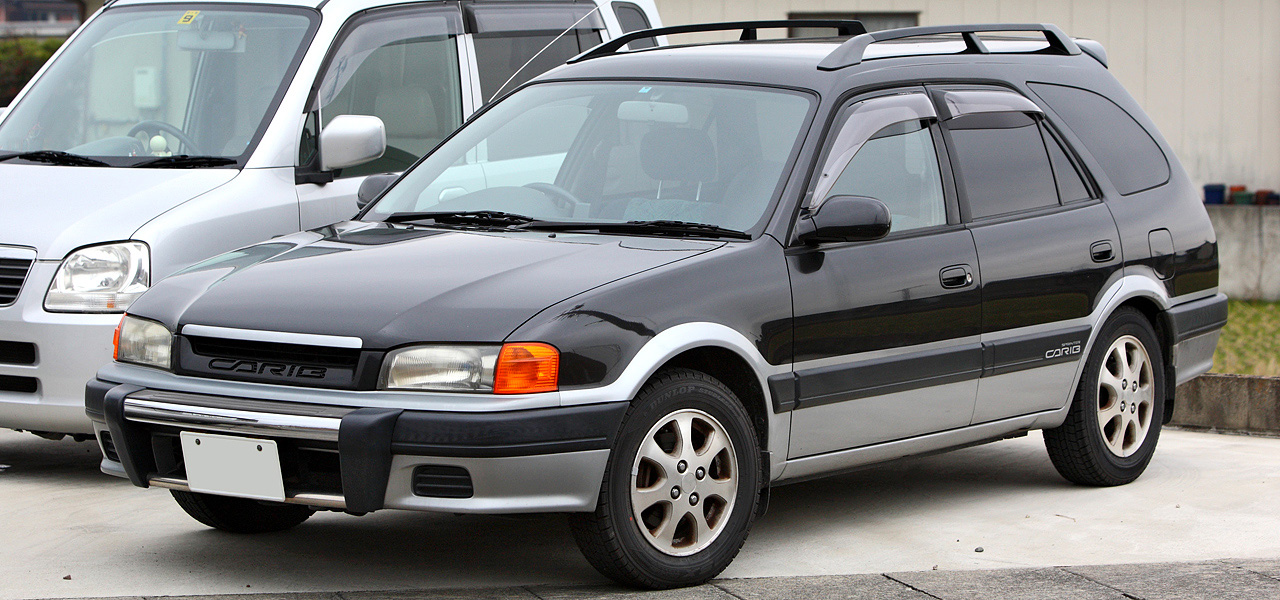

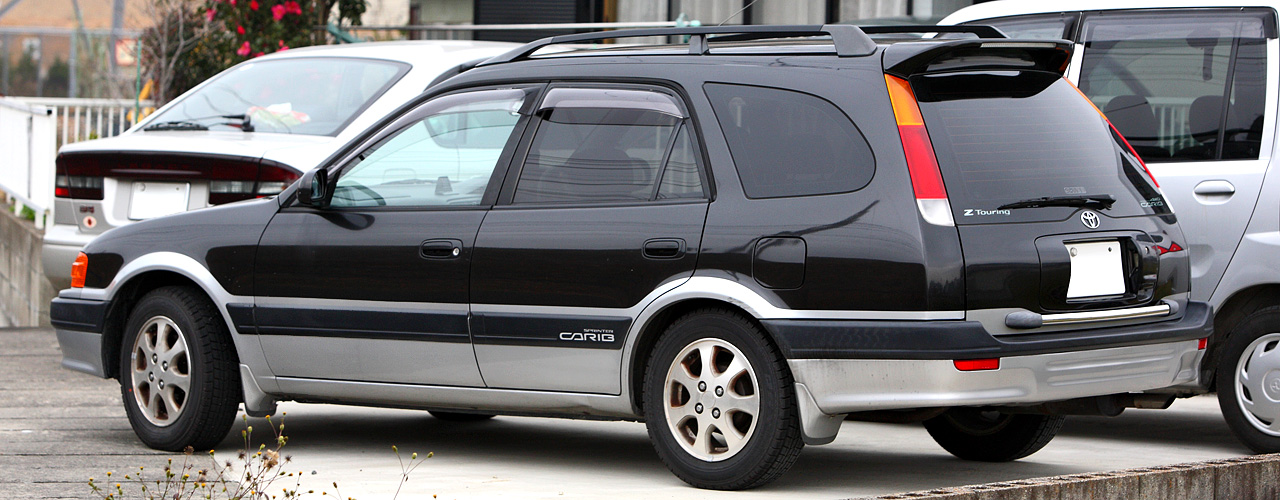
Sprinter Carib (Japan)

This was the last Corolla generation to have an equivalent Sprinter model, and the Levin sports package upgrade. Neither the hatchback nor the liftback were available in the Japanese market. The Sprinter Carib wagon was identical to the European Corolla wagon and was only available in Japan as a Sprinter. The previous generation Corolla Wagons and Vans continued to be sold alongside the new generation until 2000 (Touring Wagons) and 2002 (Vans, Assista Wagon). The Sprinter, exclusive to Toyota Auto Store Japanese dealerships was renamed the Toyota Allex and was modified from a sedan to five-door hatchback.

Japanese models received minor changes in April 1997 with new nose, tail and interior. The rear panel was redesigned, therefore the trunk and tail lights are not interchangeable between the old and facelift models. The new Japanese rear panel is the same as the European model. Japanese models were replaced by the E120 in 2000.

Japanese market engines:

- 4E-FE – 1.3 L (1331 cc) I4, 16-valve DOHC, FI, 88 PS (65 kW)
- 5A-FE – 1.5 L (1498 cc) I4, 16-valve DOHC, FI, 100 PS (74 kW)
- 4A-FE – 1.6 L (1587 cc) I4, 16-valve DOHC, FI, 115 PS (85 kW)
- 4A-GE – 1.6 L (1587 cc) I4, 20-valve DOHC, FI, 165 PS (121 kW)
- 2C-III – 2.0 L (1974 cc) I4, diesel, FI, 73 PS (54 kW)
- 3C-E – 2.2 L (2184 cc) I4, diesel, EFI, 79 PS (58 kW)

== Southeast Asia ==

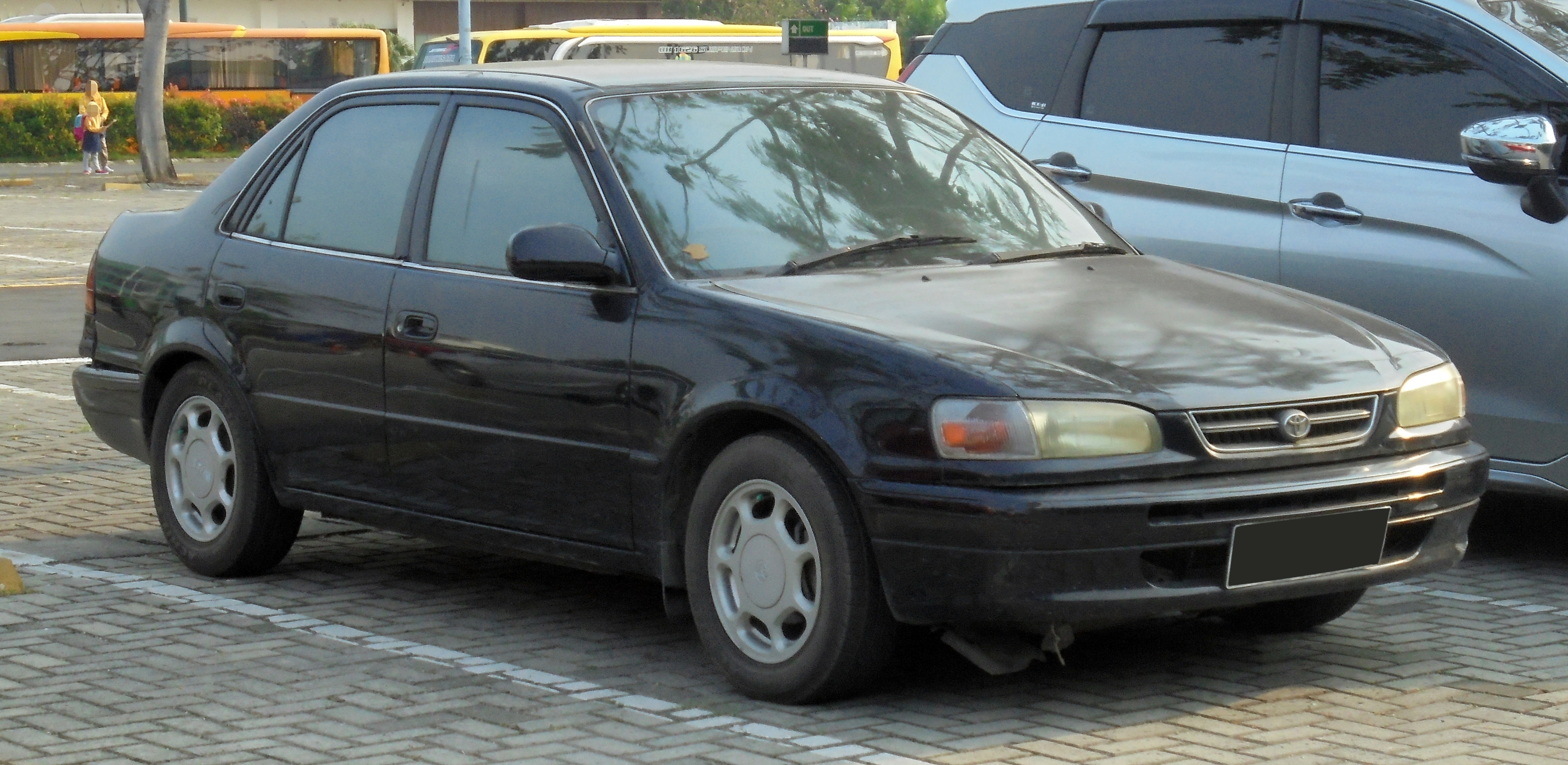
Top image: 1996–1998 Corolla sedan S-Cruise (Indonesia) Bottom image: 1996-1998 Corolla sedan SE-G (Indonesia)

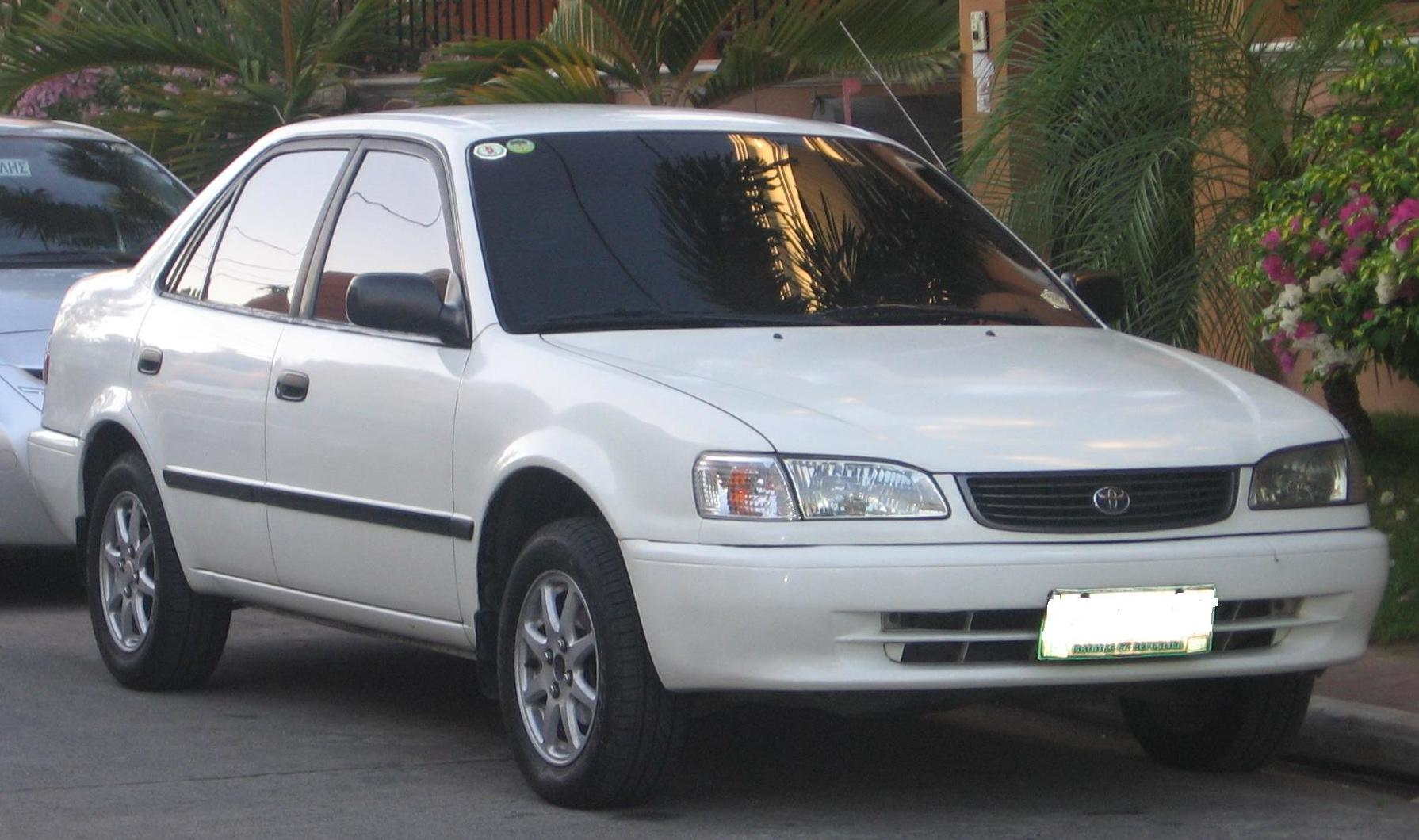
1998–1999 Corolla sedan (Philippines)

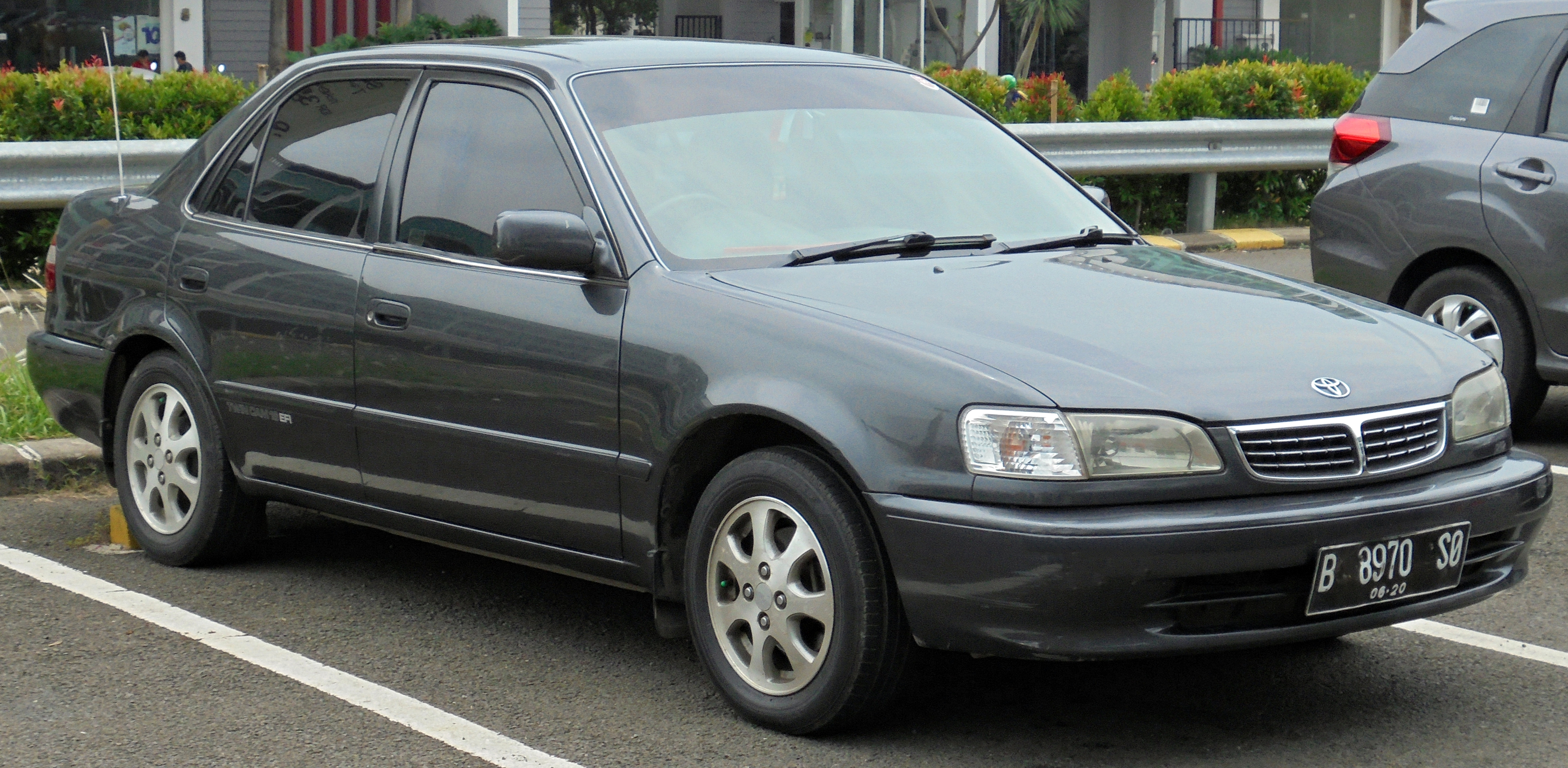
2000–2001 Corolla sedan (Indonesia)

=== Indonesia ===
This generation of the Corolla was launched in December 1995. Initially it was offered in XLi, SE-G, and S-Cruise grades, all powered by the 1.6-liter 4A-FE engine. The SE-G and S-Cruise came standard with a driver airbag, which made them the first cars to offer this safety equipment in the Indonesian compact car segment. The difference between SE-G and S-Cruise are mainly cosmetic with an added factory rear spoiler complete with an LED third brake light and a wooden trim for the dashboard. Some dealers also offered an interior clean box (trash bin) and a cabin air purifier for both trim models.

The facelifted 1.8 XLi and 1.8 SE-G came in March 1998. In addition to the newer 1.8-liter 7A-FE engine, the Corolla received new front and rear body panels and upgraded interior. The SE-G also came standard with ABS and an additional passenger airbag.

On the island of Batam, where used imports from Singapore are popular, the Corolla GLi E110 is one of the most common models, in the private car and taxi segment. Together with the local XLi and SE-G, the Singaporean GLi are common sights in this island. The majority of the E110s are the facelifted North American/Japan/Asian models, although there are a few pre-facelift 1995 models.

=== Malaysia ===
In Malaysia, the E110 series Corolla was offered in two grades from February 1996, GLi and SE-G. Both were powered by the 1.6-liter 4A-FE engine. The SE-G and GLi came standard with airbags. 7330 Corollas were built in Malaysia in 1996.

A facelift was offered in 2 grades, SE-G and GLi variants was offered in April 1998. In addition to the bigger 1.8-liter 7A-FE Hi-Torq engine, the Corolla received new front and rear body panels, upgraded interior, and ABS was also standard on the SE-G.

=== Philippines ===
In the Philippines, the E110 Corolla, nicknamed "Love Life" or "Baby Altis", was launched in December 1997, and was originally available in three grades: XL, XE, and GLi. The 1.3L 2E and 1.6L 4A-FE engines, as well as the 5-speed manual and 4-speed automatic transmissions are carried over from the previous generation.

At introduction, the GLi was the top-of-the-line model, featuring a 1.6 L 4A-FE engine and trim-exclusive Red Mica body paint. This specification had power windows and locks, an optional spoiler, a digital clock with an Alpine 4-channel head unit, standard ABS, and TVSS (Toyota Vehicle Security System) keyless locks, and was available with either a 5-speed manual or 4-speed automatic transmission. A special variant named TOM'S Toyota Corolla Turbo that was based on the GLi trim was offered in 1999 through dealers where it sold body kits and a complete turbo kit for its 1.6 L 4A-FE engine developed by TOM'S.

The 1.3 XE was a step up from the standard XL grade, adding dual SRS airbags, 14-inch alloy wheels, and a Fujitsu Ten 4-channel audio unit. This variant was only available with a 5-speed manual transmission.

The 1.3 XL was the Corolla's cheapest model at launch, equipped with basic features like a two-spoke polypropylene steering wheel, wind-up windows, 13" steel wheels, Fujitsu Ten 2-channel stereo, and 5-speed manual transmission. It was sold as rental cars and taxis alongside the E120 Corolla Altis until May 2004, when it was replaced by the newly launched Toyota Vios J variant.

In 1999, a new 1.3 LE trim was introduced, with comparable features to the XL and XE grades but with a 5-speed manual transmission and 14-inch alloy wheels; it was phased out in early 2003 and replaced by the Vios E and G trims.

The XE and GLi versions were redesigned in early 2000. The name 'Corolla Altis' was first applied to a new 1.8 SE-G trim with identical features to the GLi, including a new 1.8 L 7A-FE engine, modified front and rear body panels, a remodeled grille, and a 4-speed automatic transmission. All were available until mid-2001, with the exception of the XL and LE trims.

Toyota Motor Philippines also made an interactive CD brochure featuring the GLi, XE and XL models.

Engine specifications for PH models
Model	Engine type	Max. output	Max. torque
1.3 L XE / XL / LE	SOHC 12V 2E (Carburetor)	72 hp (53 kW) at 6,200 rpm	101 N⋅m (74 lb⋅ft) at 4,200 rpm
1.6 L GLi	DOHC 16V 4A-FE (EFI)	110 hp (81 kW) at 6,800 rpm	145 N⋅m (107 lb⋅ft) at 4,800 rpm
1.8 L SE-G 'Altis'	DOHC 16V 7A-FE (EFI)	120 hp (88 kW) at 6,000 rpm	149 N⋅m (110 lb⋅ft) at 4,400 rpm

=== Singapore ===
The E110 was one of the best-selling cars during its time in Singapore. It was commonly used as a taxicab there. Many of these cars were exported to Batam for use as taxis in the 2000s.

=== Thailand ===
In Thailand, the E110 series Corolla was launched in July 1996. It was initially offered in DXi, GXi and SE-G trim levels — they were powered by either 1.5-liter 5A-FE engine or the 1.6-liter 4A-FE engine, this iteration of Corolla is nicknamed as "Tong Nueng" or Duck-Ass model.

Trims offered on the pre-facelift model:

- 1.5 DXi – 1.5-liter DOHC 5A-FE engine, 5-speed manual transmission, tilt-adjustable steering (3-spoke), no tachometer, includes power steering and stereo, vinyl seats, 13-inch steel rims with hubcaps.
- 1.5 GXi – 1.5-liter DOHC 5A-FE engine, 5-speed manual and 4-speed automatic transmissions, tilt-adjustable steering (3-spoke), includes tachometer, power steering and stereo, power windows and door locks, fabric seats, 13-inch steel rims with hubcaps, includes Driver's airbag.
- 1.6 GXi – 1.6-liter DOHC 4A-FE engine, 5-speed manual transmission, tilt steering adjustment (4-spoke), includes tachometer, power steering and stereo, power windows and door locks, power mirrors, 14-inch alloy rims, fabric seats, ABS (anti-lock braking system) and driver's airbag.
- 1.6 SE-G – 1.6-liter DOHC 4A-FE engine, 4-speed automatic transmission, tilt steering adjustment (4-spoke), includes tachometer, power steering and stereo, power windows and door locks, power mirrors with auto-folding function, 14-inch alloy rims, fabric seats, ABS (anti-lock braking system) and driver's airbag.

The facelift model was introduced in April 1998, offered in three grades: GXi, GXi-S and SE-G, the bigger 1.8-liter 7A-FE engine was added and the 1.5-liter 5A-FE engine was discontinued. In June 1999, the 1.8 SE-G trim was rebranded into Corolla Altis, making it more luxurious than the standard Corolla. In March 2000, the tail lights of Corolla Altis models were changed to the ones that is similar to the European market and the 1.6-liter SE-G trim was added, this facelifted Corolla was marketed as "Hi-Torque" due to its more powerful engine.

Trims offered in the facelifted model:

Marketed as Corolla:

- 1.6 GXi – 1.6-liter DOHC 4A-FE engine, 5-speed manual and 4-speed automatic transmissions, tilt steering adjustment (4-spoke), includes tachometer, power steering and stereo, power windows and door locks, power mirrors, velvet Fabric seats, 14-inch alloy rims, includes ABS (Anti-lock braking system) and Driver's airbag.
- 1.6 GXi-S – 1.6-liter DOHC 4A-FE engine, 5-speed manual and 4-speed automatic transmissions, same specifications and features as 1.6 GXi plus Leather seats and sporty accessories such as Rear Spoiler, Side Skirts and different design of Alloy wheels.

Marketed as Corolla Altis:

- 1.6 SE-G – 1.6-liter DOHC 4A-FE engine, 5-speed manual and 4-speed automatic transmissions, tilt steering adjustment (4-spoke leather wrapped), includes tachometer, power steering and stereo, power windows and door locks, power mirrors with auto-folding function, dial-type airconditioning system, velvet Fabric seats, 15-inch alloy rims, factory-fitted side skirts and rear spoiler, includes ABS (Anti-lock braking system) with EBD (Electronic Brake-force Distribution) and Dual SRS airbags, added in March 2000.
- 1.8 SE-G – 1.8-liter DOHC 7A-FE engine, 5-speed manual and 4-speed automatic transmission, tilt steering adjustment (4-spoke leather wrapped), includes tachometer, power steering and stereo, power windows and door locks, power mirrors with auto-folding function, push-button automatic climate control, genuine Leather seats, 15-inch alloy rims, factory-fitted side skirts and rear spoiler, includes ABS (Anti-lock braking system) with EBD (Electronic Brake-force Distribution) and Dual SRS airbags, formerly marketed as Corolla 1.8 SE-G between February 1998 and May 1999.

== North America ==
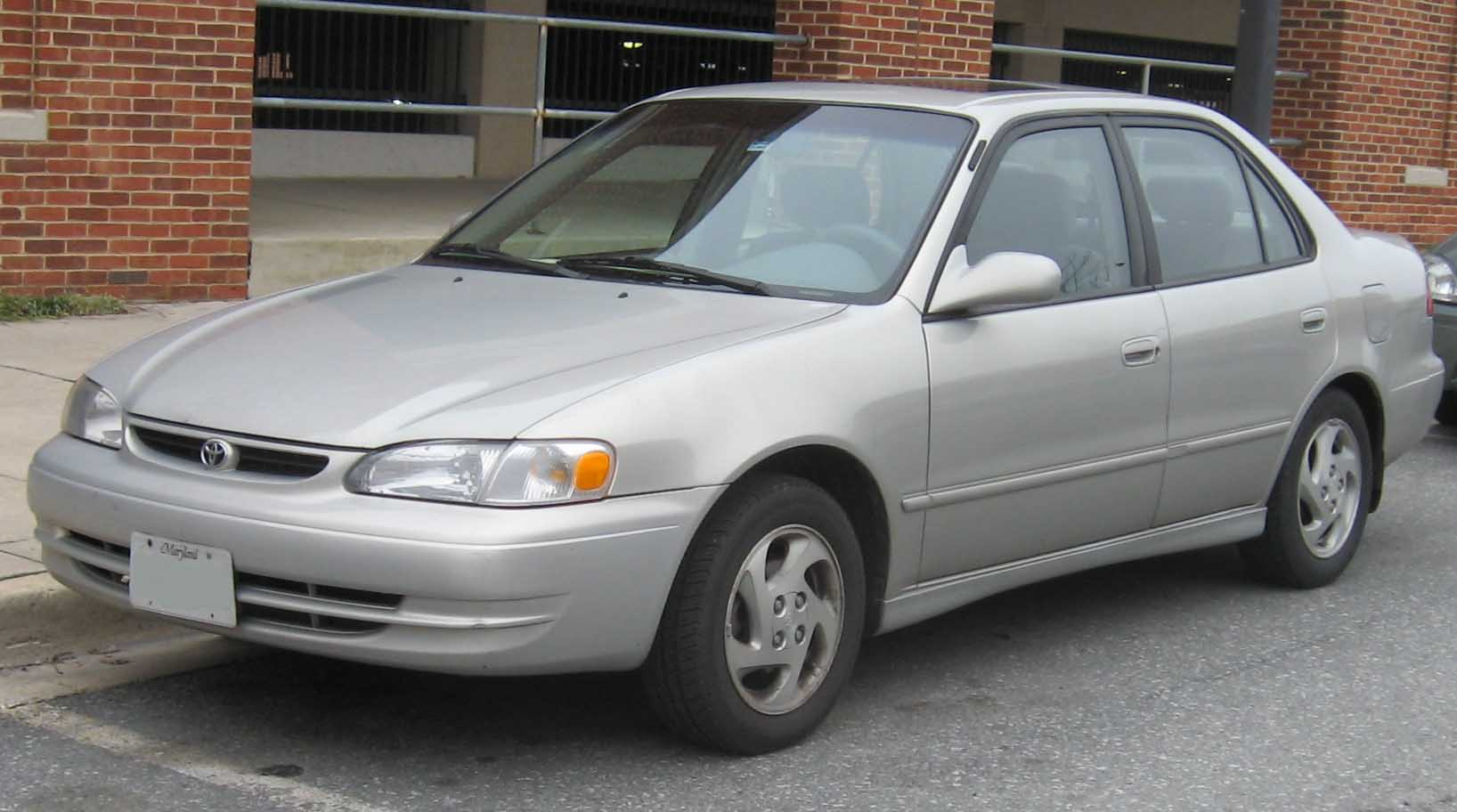

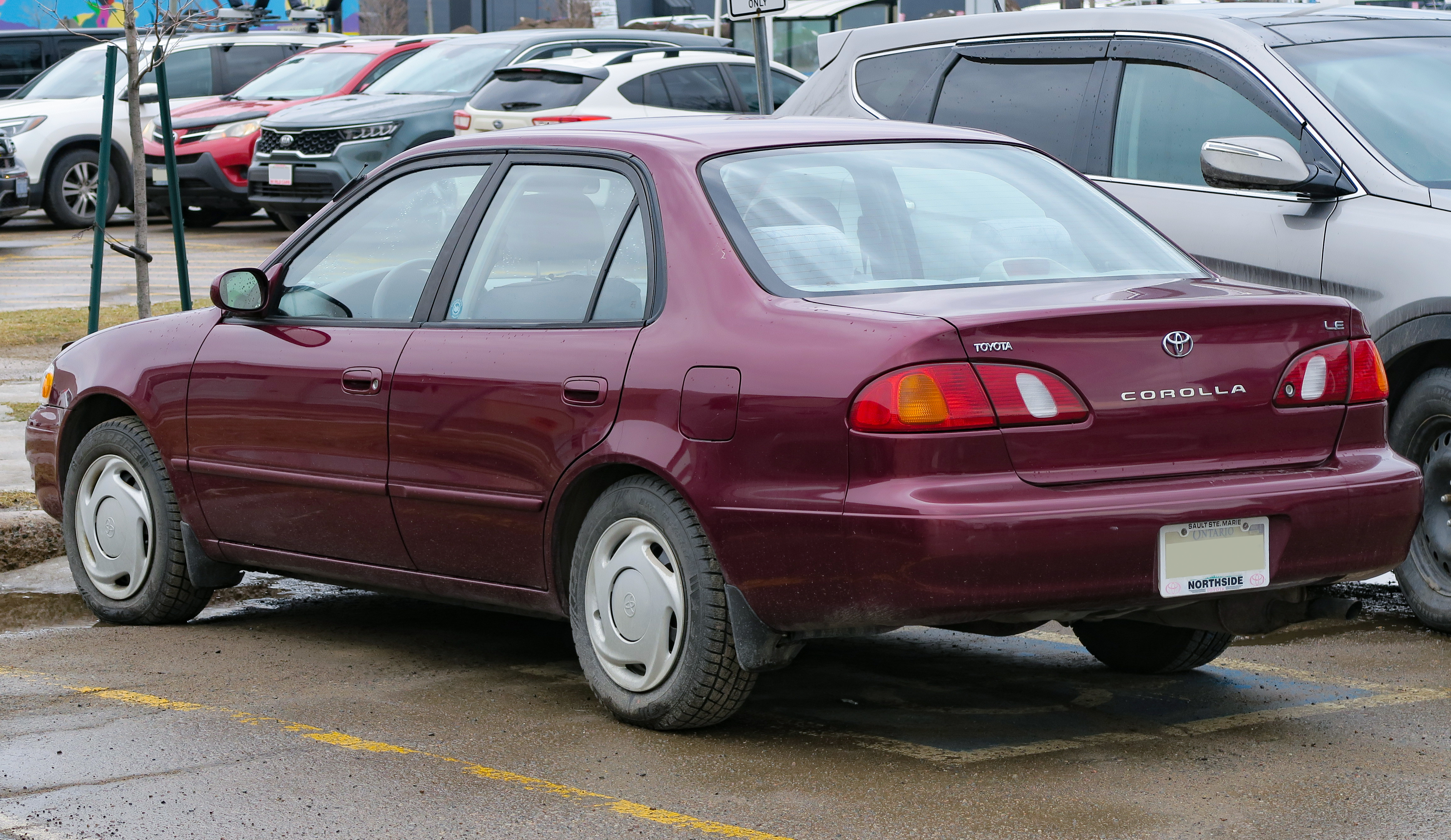
Corolla (North America; pre-facelift)

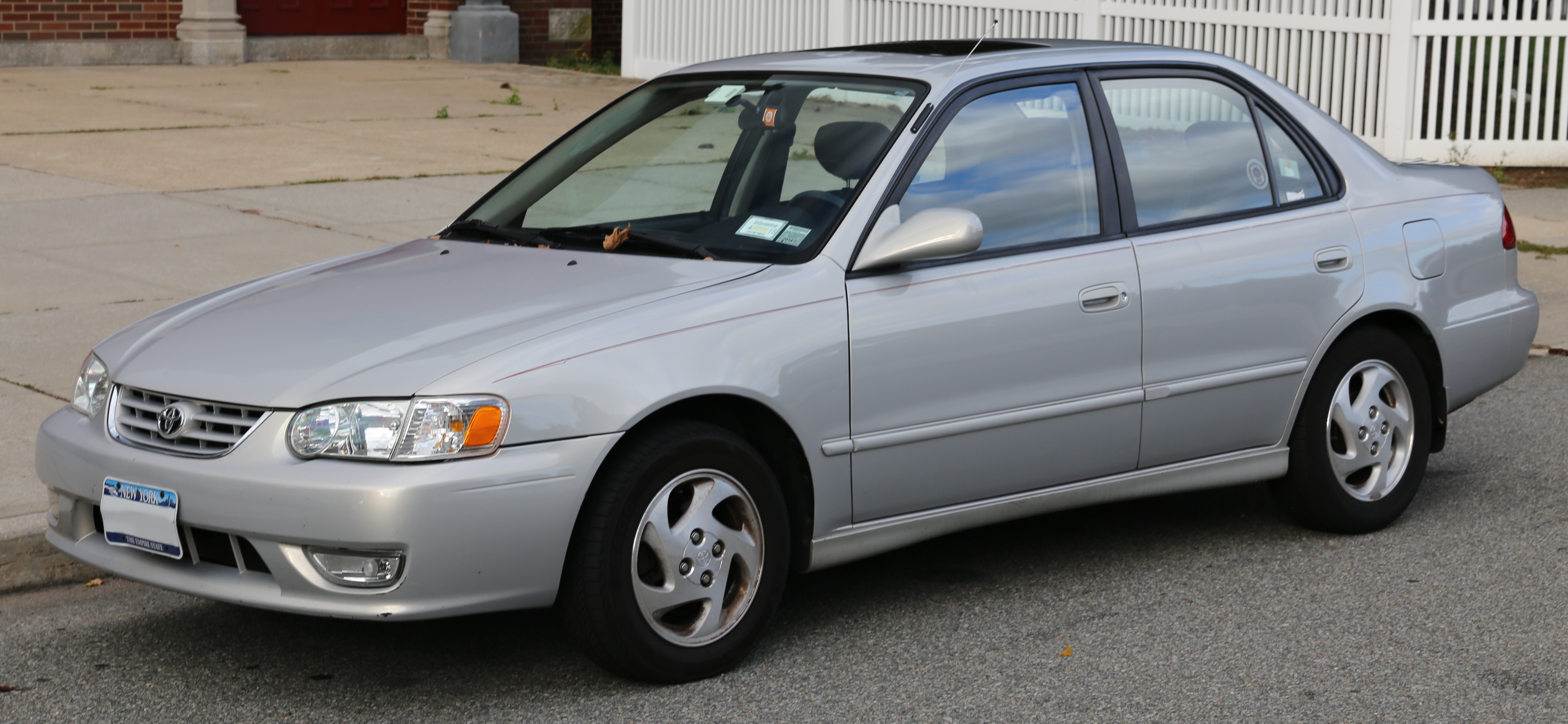

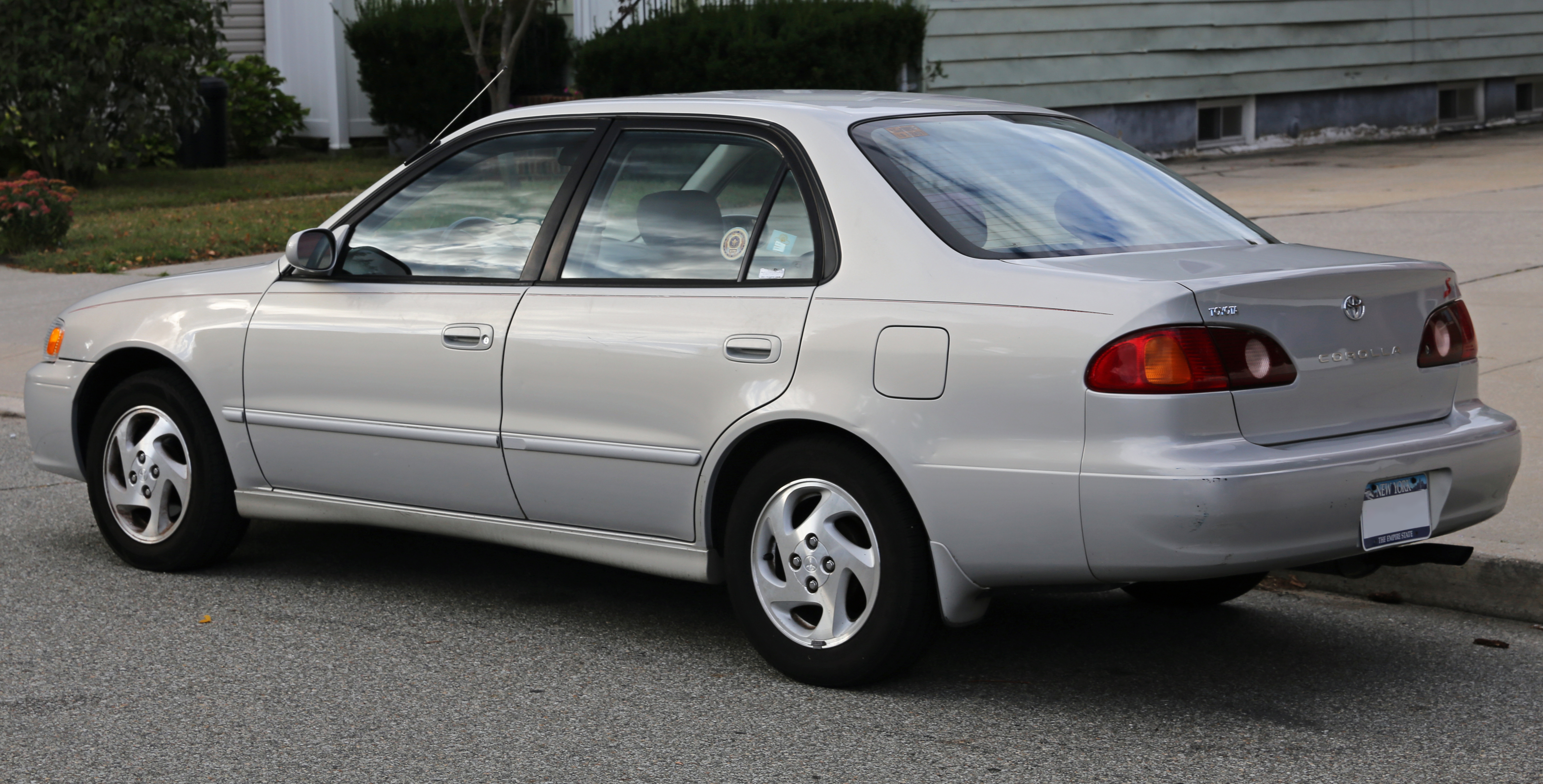
Corolla S (North America; facelift)

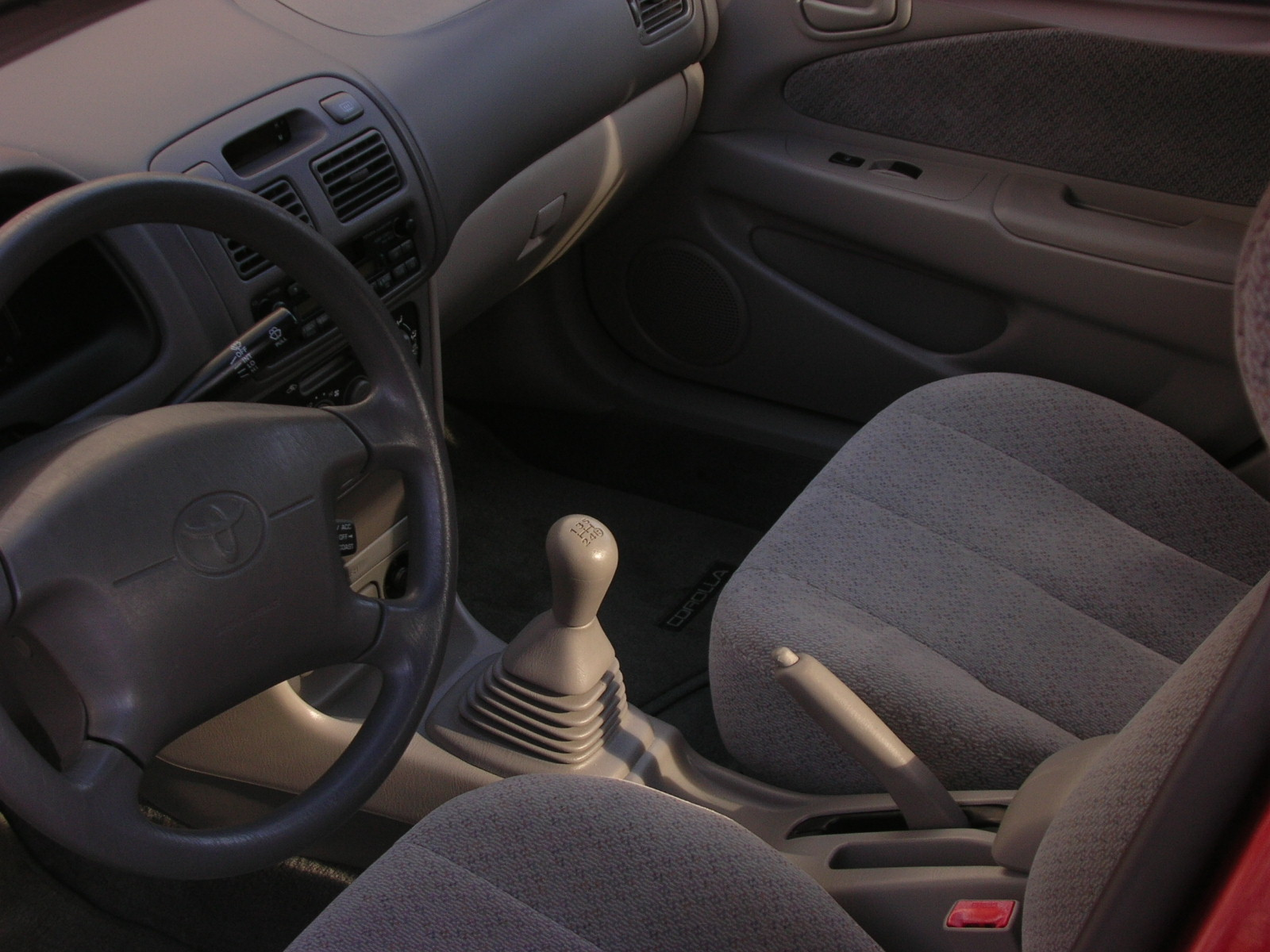
Interior (North America)

Introduced in 1997 for the 1998 model year, all Corollas for the North American market were either built in Fremont, California (by NUMMI) or Cambridge, Ontario (by TMMC). Unlike the Japanese counterparts, the North American Corolla at the time was only offered as a four-door compact sedan. A newly developed all-aluminum 1ZZ-FE engine powered all Corollas, making this generation lighter than its predecessor. This new engine uses a timing chain instead of a timing belt. It also incorporated laser etched valve guides directly in the block, rather than the old shrink-to-fit valve guides in the preceding Corolla motors (4A-FE & 7A-FE). This prevents oil burning and valve guide failure in the future. Although these efforts theoretically would have decreased oil burn, a flawed piston ring design affected all engines without VVT-i. This new engine design, although decreasing oil consumption from some components ultimately caused oil burning in higher mileage examples.

In North America, only sedans were offered, and all came with day-time running lights. This Corolla has a maximum legal carrying capacity of 1,500 lb (680 kg). Trim levels are VE, CE and LE. The VE model was the base model available in a 3-speed automatic or the 5-speed manual transmission with 175/65R14 tires. The CE and LE models offered either the 4-speed automatic with overdrive or the 5-speed manual transmission with 185/65R14 tires, although some early Canadian market 1998 CEs came with 175/65R14 tires. Some options for the later model CE and LE models included a power sunroof, and an optional Touring Package. This package contained color matched side skirts, color matched rear mudflaps, a white faced instrument cluster with tachometer and outside temperature gauge, and aluminum wheels. Side airbags and ABS were optional for the CE and LE models, but very few cars had this option. The first batch of 1998 Corolla VE's did not have a front sway bar, but by June 1998 it was included on all models. VVT-i variable valve timing and individual coils for each cylinder were added to the engine in the 2000 model year with a small increase in power from 120 hp (89 kW) to 125 hp (93 kW) along with child seat anchors added on the rear deck. The then-recently introduced VVT-i optimizes cam and valve timing to reduce emissions, and the addition of individual coils for each cylinder helped control spark timing to each individual cylinder.

For the 2001 model year (2000 calendar year), the VE was replaced by a new S model. The CE now became a base model, still offered in 5-speed manual or 3-speed automatic transmission, and the sporty S served as the new Touring Package, which came with a 5-speed manual or 4-speed automatic transmission. The 2001 model year also got a slight refresh with the new front headlights/corner lights, redesigned front bumper, auxiliary DC power port with a higher armrest (LE and S models), inside trunk release for accidental lockouts in the trunk, new controls for the air conditioner that had the rear glass defrost button relocated with a button for the recirculation of air, and round reverse lights. The 'sportiness' of the S model built upon the VE models with a gauge cluster with tachometer in a red/black theme with an outside temperature gauge, the lightweight 3-spoke steering wheel used in the Toyota Celica and Matrix of the same model year, a charcoal gray and black interior with lighter seats, standard front fog lamps, color matched side skirts, color matched rear mudflaps, color matched door handles and side mirrors, a color matched front grille, a trunk release lever next to the gasoline cap door lever (but not on the remote fob), a trunk light, 14" S model wheel covers, and lighted map lights on the rear view mirror. The S model lacked the 60/40 folding rear seats in other models.

The 2002 model year was short-lived and was only produced until the end of 2001 to make way for the redesigned model which launched in early 2002 for the 2003 model year.

Official Toyota accessories available through dealerships for all trim levels of the eighth generation Corolla included: front-end mask, gold emblem package, color-keyed rear spoiler with center high-mount stop lamp, wheel covers, aluminum alloy wheels, wheel locks, mudguards, sunroof wind deflector (LE and S models only), genuine wood dash appliqué, carpeted floor mats, all-weather floor mats, carpeted trunk mat, trunk cargo net, Toyota VIP RS3000 remote keyless security system, 6-disc trunk-mounted CD changer, compact disc deck (fits in storage bin), and a 6-disc in-dash CD changer.

North American market engines:

- 1998–1999 – 1ZZ-FE, 1.8 L (1,794 cc) I4, 16-valve DOHC, FI, 120 hp (89 kW) at 5600 rpm, 122 lb⋅ft (165 N⋅m) at 4400 rpm
- 2000–2002 – 1ZZ-FE, 1.8 L (1,794 cc) I4, 16-valve DOHC, FI, VVT-i, 125 hp (93 kW) at 5800 rpm, 125 lb⋅ft (169 N⋅m) at 4000 rpm

== Europe, Middle East and Oceania ==
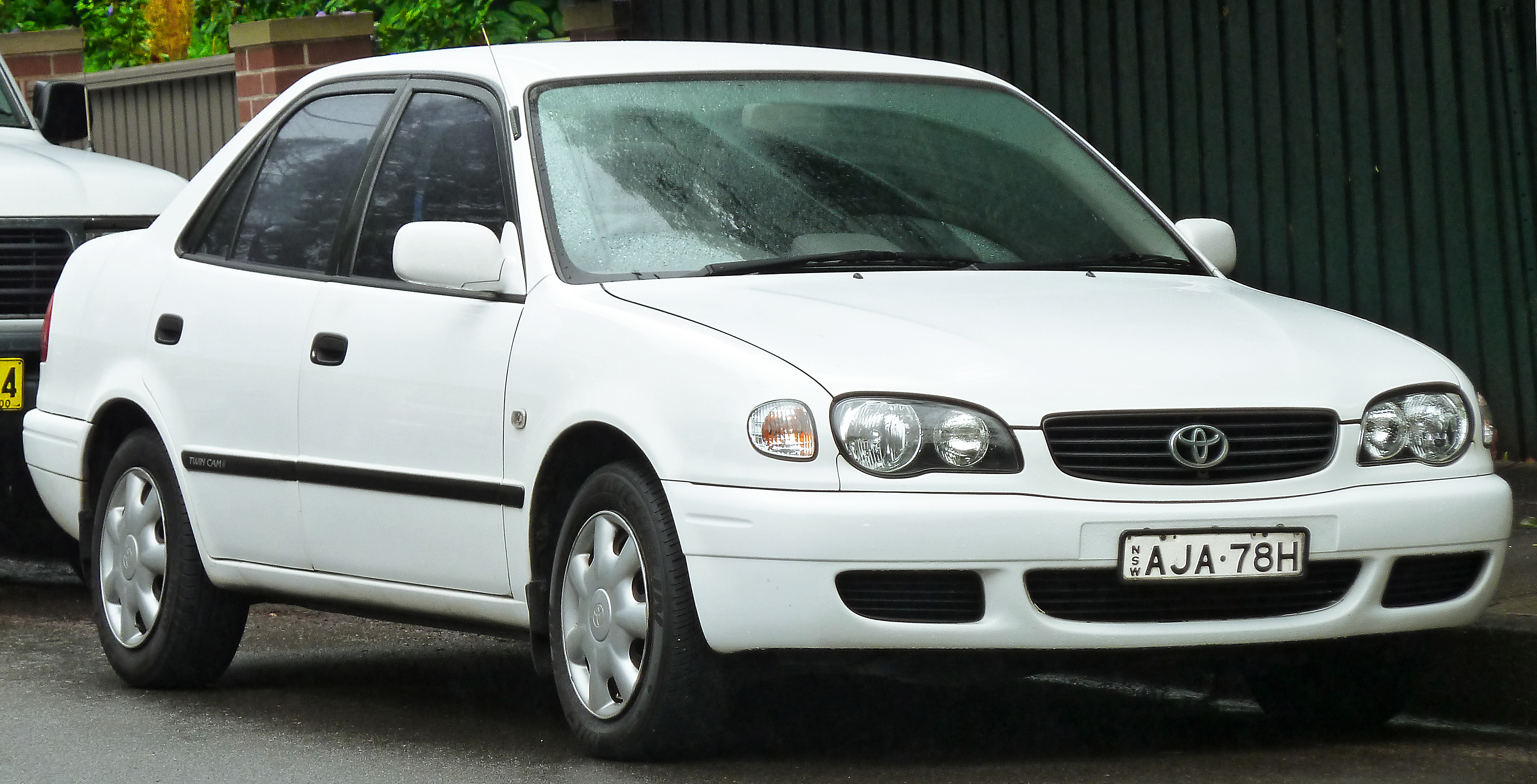

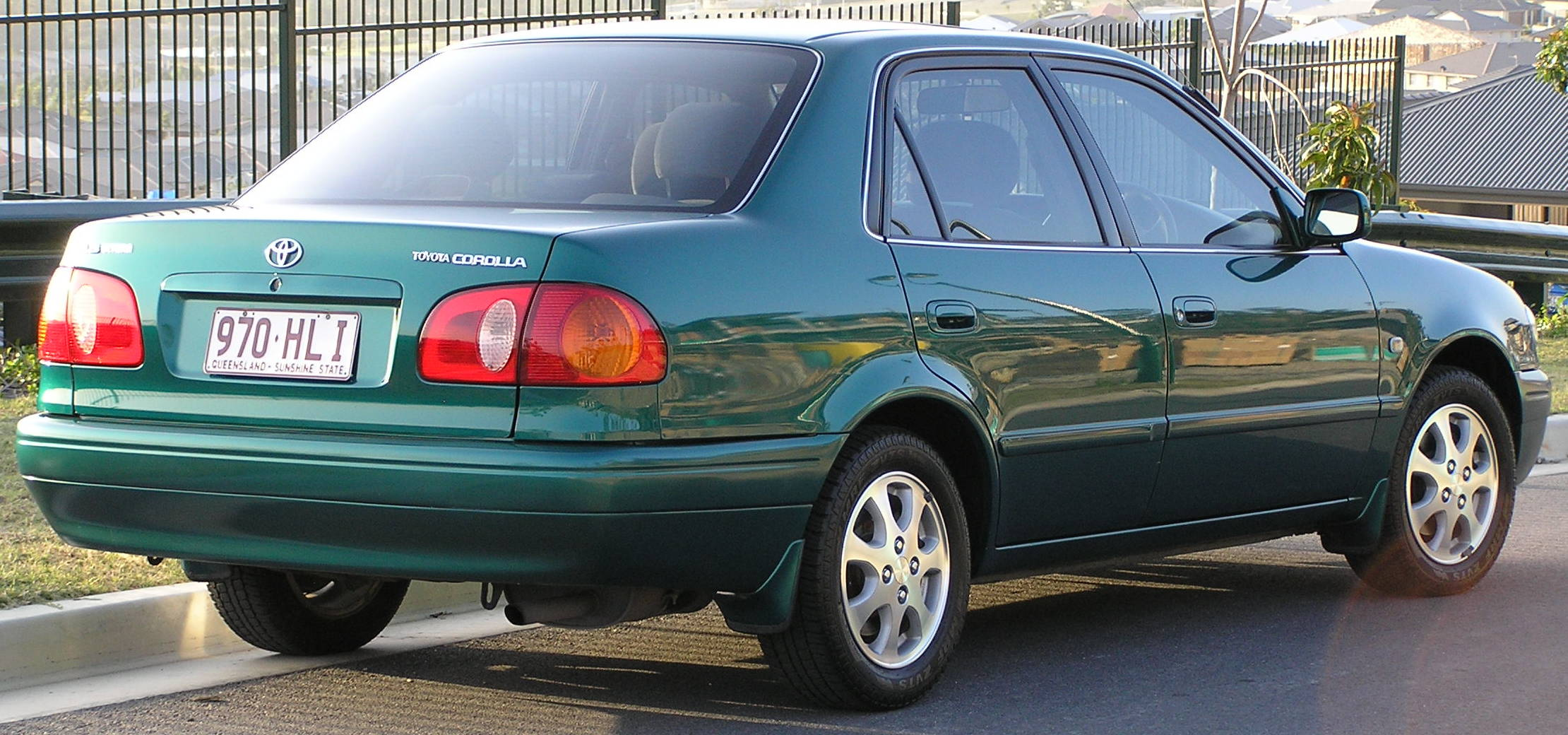
Corolla sedan (Australia; facelift)

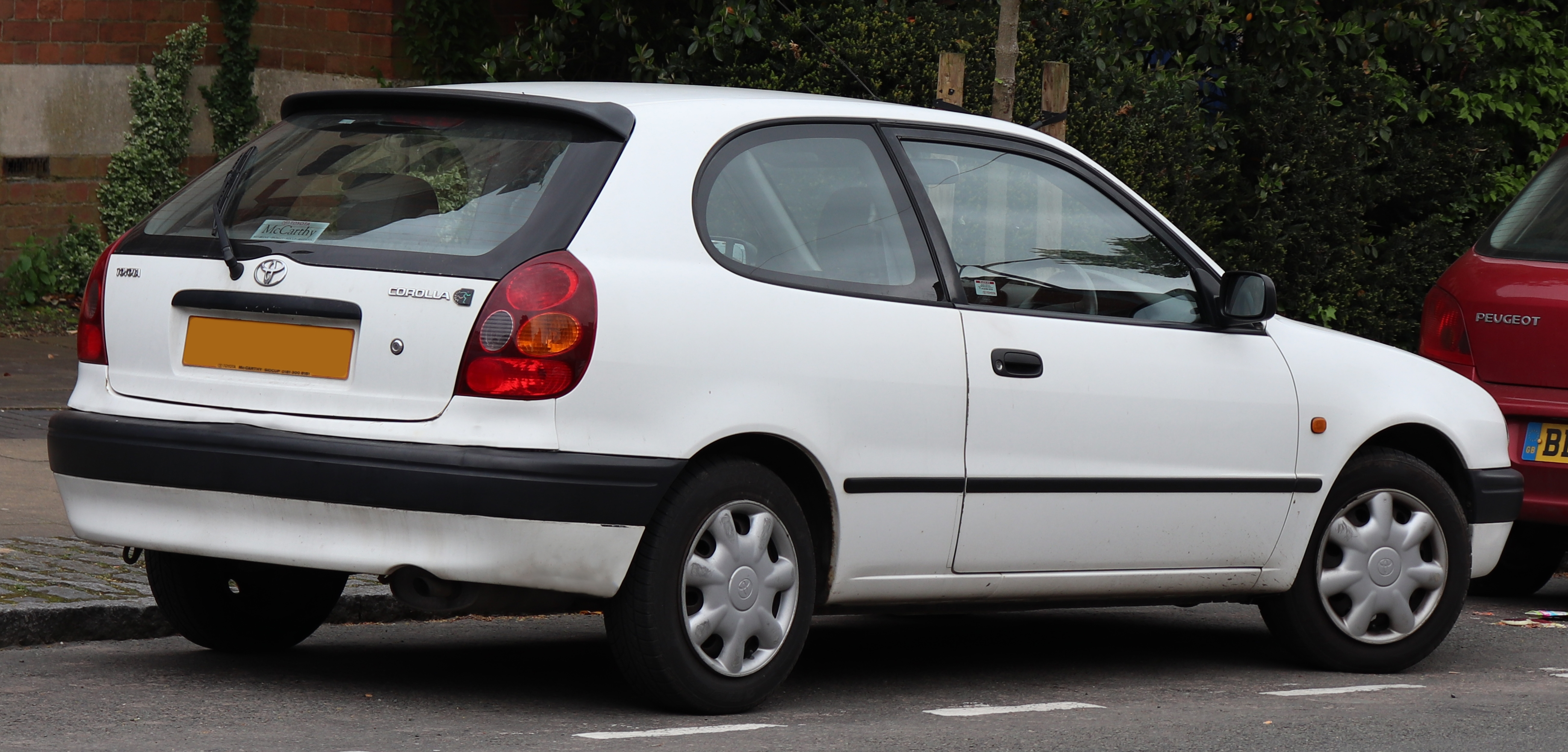
3-door hatchback (UK; pre-facelift)

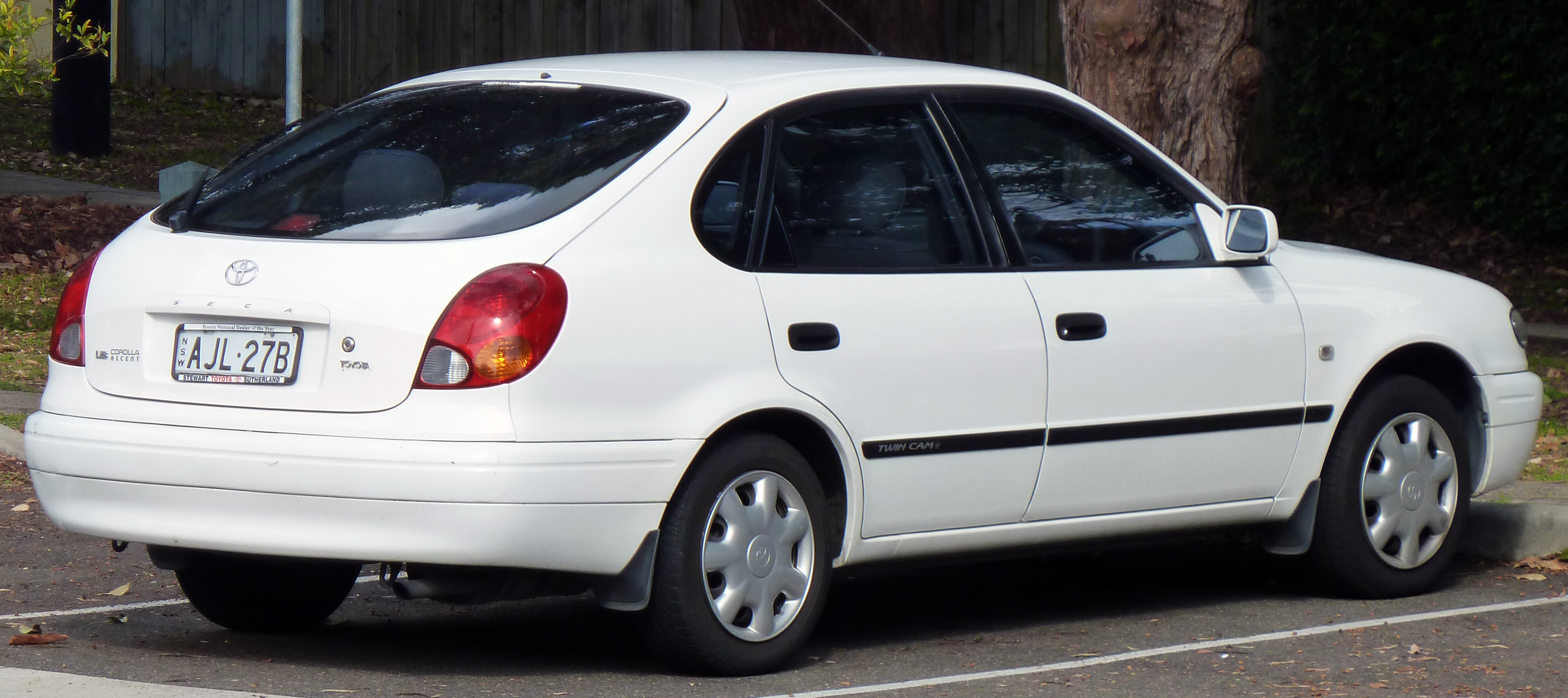
Corolla Ascent liftback (Australia; facelift)

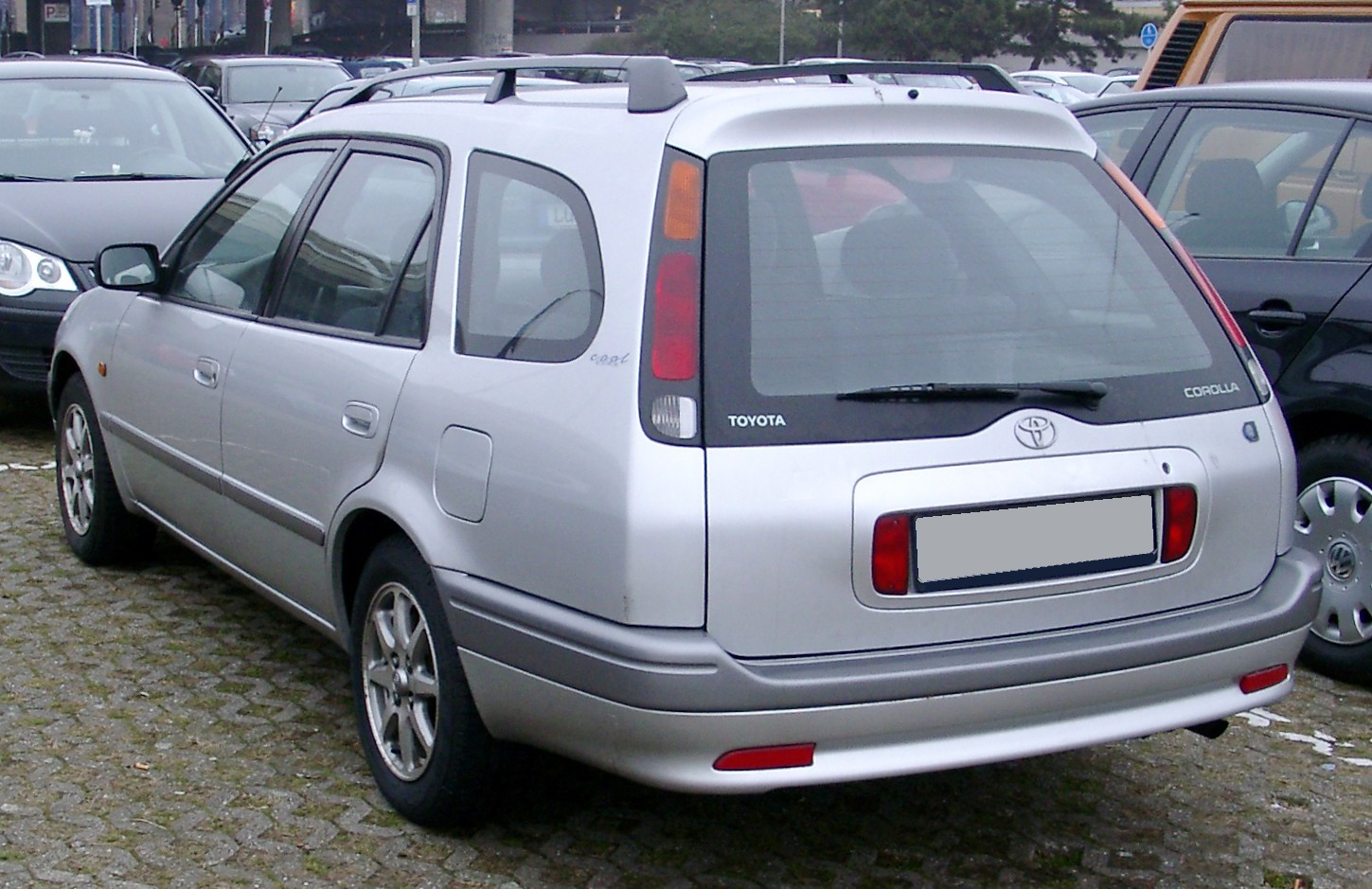
Wagon version (Germany; pre-facelift)

This range had different front and rear ends to the Japanese models, though the sides and interior remained mostly the same. It can be distinguished by the round headlights and mesh grille. As a result, a sporting model with a six-speed gearbox was offered. The European three-door hatchback is the base for the Corolla World Rally Car (WRC) that competed in the World Rally Championship from 1997 to 2000. Japanese production for Europe ended in September 2001, while Toyota's British plant built the E110 Corolla for an additional two months.

In Australia, the Corolla liftback is called Seca. Grades for sedan and Seca are Ascent, Conquest, and Ultima. New Zealand market E110s had the 1.3 L 4E, the 1.5 L 5A-FE, 1.6 L 4A-FE, 1.8 L 7A-FE gasoline engines or the 2.2-liter 3C-E diesel engine as of 2000, whereas Australia only offered the 7A-FE, with a unique turbocharged Sportivo model offered in 2001. In 1997, the Corolla Spacio, with its body panels stamped at long-time Toyota supplier Kanto Auto Works, was introduced as a two-box minivan version, which was technically similar to the Avensis in Europe. The E110 was the last generation of Corolla to have an upmarket Sprinter Carib offshoot; for Oceania this was based on the five-door station wagon. The 3-door hatchback was not sold in Japan, Australia or New Zealand.

In New Zealand, until late 1998, CKD kits were brought in from Japan and assembled in plants located in Thames and Christchurch. Locally produced components were also used, and included items such as tyres, seats, trims, and glass.

In the United Kingdom, the models were 1.3 and 1.6 GS, 1.6 GLS, 1.6 CD, 1.6 SR and 2.0D GS.

This generation received a facelift in 1999, featuring a different hood, fenders, headlights, turnlights, grilles, front bumper and the new ZZ series engines with VVT-i replacing the old A series engines, except in Australia. The facelift also saw Toyota's own 2.0 diesel unit being replaced by a Peugeot-sourced 1.9-liter naturally-aspirated diesel for most European markets. In August 2000, this was replaced by Toyota's new 1CD-FTV Common rail, direct injection diesel engine.

=== Corolla G6 and G6R ===
The G6 was a special version of the European E110 Corolla hatchback, powered by a 1.3 L 4E-FE or a 1.6 L 4A-FE engine in the pre-facelift and by a 1.4-liter 4ZZ-FE or a 1.6-liter 3ZZ-FE engine in the facelift, the G6 features color-matched bumpers, front Lip (pre-facelift and facelift optional) and unique to this model: short-ratio 6-speed C161/C162 transmission, all-wheel disc brakes from the E110 liftback, front honeycomb grille, black/red honeycomb dials and silver cluster face. Some cars were fitted with 15-inch OZ Racing Superturismo rims as a dealer option.

To celebrate Toyota's 1999 Manufacturer's World Rally Championship the G6R was created, going on sale in December 1998. It was a 1.6-liter, pre-facelift Corolla G6 with several extras unique to this model: an aluminum hood to reduce weight, red seat belts, color-matched front lip from the G6, color-matched side skirts, unique 15-inch alloy wheels and special commemorative badges. This version was only available in the UK, Spain, Netherlands and Germany; 420 examples were made for the United Kingdom.

Toyota's aim for these special models was to increase fun by decreasing weight rather than increasing power so that younger drivers wouldn't be priced out by high insurance costs. They claimed "Not a hot-hatch, the G6 placed emphasis on affordable fun rather than insurance-prohibitive performance."

European market engines:

- 4E-FE – 1.3 L (1,331 cc) I4, 16-valve DOHC, FI, 86 PS (63 kW)
- 4ZZ-FE – 1.4 L (1,398 cc) I4, 16-valve DOHC, FI, VVT-i, 97 PS (71 kW)
- 4A-FE – 1.6 L (1,587 cc) I4, 16-valve DOHC, FI, 110 PS (81 kW)
- 3ZZ-FE – 1.6 L (1,598 cc) I4, 16-valve DOHC, FI, VVT-i, 110 PS (81 kW)
- 7A-FE – 1.8 L (1,762 cc) I4, 16-valve DOHC, FI, 110 PS (81 kW)
- 1WZ – 1.9 L (1,868 cc) I4, diesel, FI, 69 PS (51 kW) Rebadged PSA DW8 Engine
- 2C-E – 2.0 L (1,974 cc) I4, diesel, FI, 72 PS (53 kW)
- 1CD-FTV – 2.0 L (1,995 cc) I4, diesel, 16-valve DOHC, turbocharged, D-4D, 90 PS (66 kW)

European market transmission:

- 5-speed manual
- 6-speed manual (Toyota "C" transmission C161/C162)
- 3-speed automatic
- 4-speed automatic

== Model codes ==
Engine Drivetrain	2E (1295 cc)	4E (1331 cc)	5A (1498 cc)	4A (1587 cc)	7A (1762 cc)	4ZZ (1398 cc)	3ZZ (1598 cc)	1ZZ (1794 cc)	1WZ (1868 cc)	2C-III (1974 cc)	3C-E (2184 cc)	1CD-FTV (1995 cc)
FF	EE110	EE111	AE110	AE111	AE112	ZZE111	ZZE112	ZZE110	WZE110	CE110	CE113	CDE110
4WD	–	–	AE114	AE115	EE110	–	–	–	–	CE114	CE116	–

== See also ==
- Toyota Corolla WRC
