= T2B =

T2B may refer to:

- t2B, code for a version of the Scion xB
- T2B, a temperature classification, also referred to as a T-code, on electrical equipment labeled for hazardous locations
