= Toyota Corolla Rumion =

Toyota Corolla Rumion (E150)
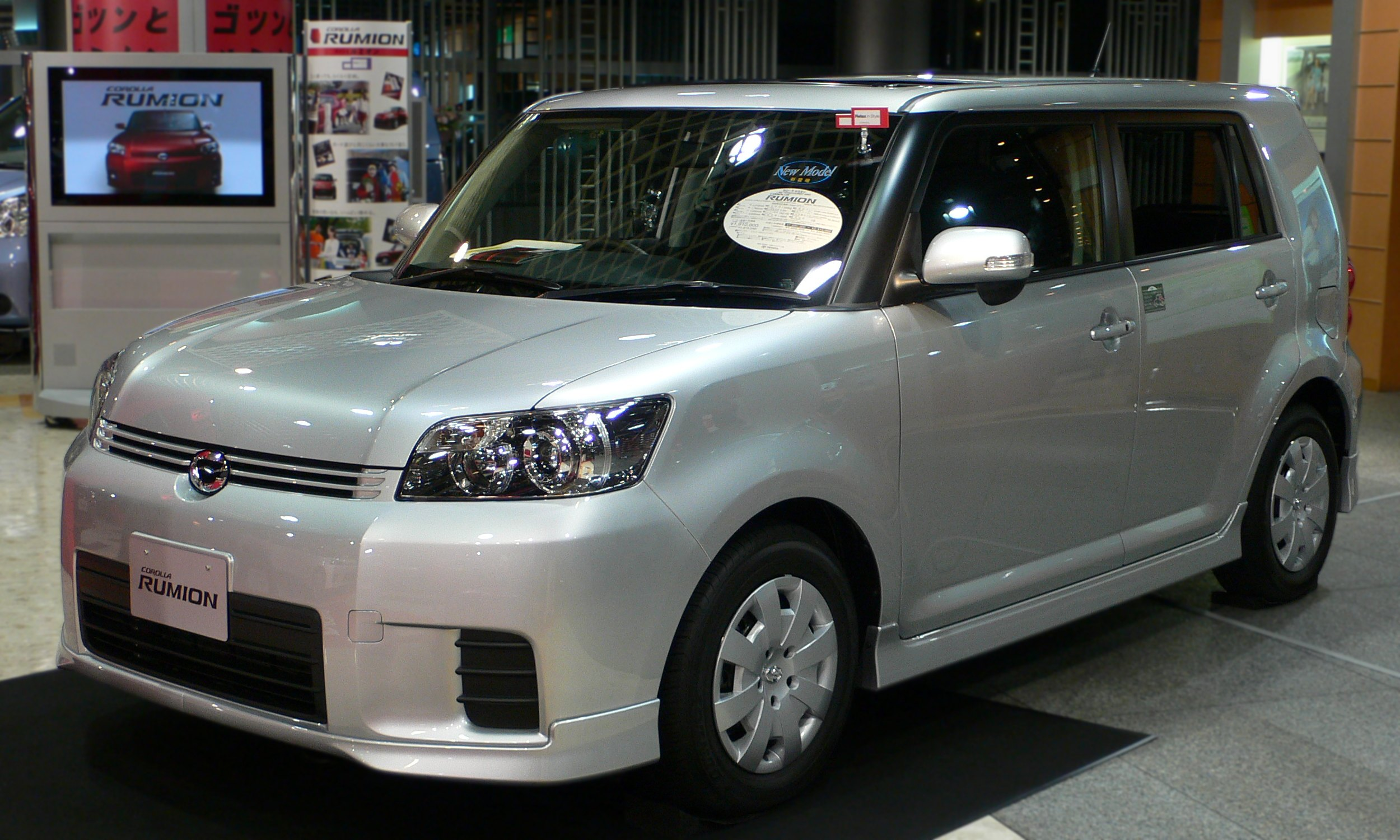
- 2007 Toyota Corolla Rumion (Japan)

Overview
- Manufacturer: Toyota
- Also called: Toyota Rukus (Australia); Scion xB (US and Canada)
- Production: 2007–2015
- Assembly: Japan: Kanegasaki, Iwate (Kanto Auto Works); Toyota, Aichi (Takaoka plant)
- Designer: Hiroaki Suzuki (2005)

Body and chassis
- Class: Compact car (C)
- Body style: 5-door hatchback
- Layout: Front-engine, front-wheel-drive Front-engine, four-wheel-drive (Japan only)
- Platform: Toyota New MC platform
- Related: Toyota Corolla (E150); Toyota Auris (E150)

Powertrain
- Engine: Petrol: 1.5 L 1NZ-FE I4 (NZE151); 1.8 L 2ZR-FAE I4 (ZRE152/154)
- Transmission: Super CVT-i

Dimensions
- Wheelbase: 2,600 mm (102.4 in)
- Length: 4,210 mm (165.7 in)
- Width: 1,760 mm (69.3 in)
- Height: 1,630–1,640 mm (64.2–64.6 in)
- Curb weight: 1,270–1,400 kg (2,800–3,086 lb)

Chronology
- Predecessor: Toyota Corolla Spacio (E120); Toyota bB (styling)
- Successor: Toyota Auris (E180)

The Toyota Corolla Rumion (Japanese: トヨタ・カローラルミオン, Hepburn: Toyota Karōra Rumion), also called the Toyota Rukus in Australia, and the Scion xB in the US and Canada, is a compact 5-door hatchback produced by Toyota from 2007 to 2015. Based on the E150 series Corolla, the design of the car had been adapted from the xB to meet the Japanese preferences. It is also the first Japanese domestic market Corolla model to exceed the Japanese compact car's 1,695 mm (66.7 in) width limit, by having 1,760 mm (69.3 in).

The "Rumion" nameplate was revived in October 2021 for the rebadged second-generation Suzuki Ertiga marketed in India and various African countries.

== Specifications ==
=== Body styles ===
Chassis codes	(DBA-)ZRE152N-FHXSK	(DBA-)NZE151N-FHXEK	(DBA-)NZE151N-FHXNK	(DBA-)ZRE154N-FHXSK
Model	1.8S 2WD	1.5G 2WD	1.5X 2WD	1.8S 4WD
Drive	FWD	FWD	FWD	4WD
Engine	2ZR-FAE	1NZ-FE	1NZ-FE	2ZR-FAE

=== Engines ===
Code	Years	Capacity	Type	Power at rpm	Torque at rpm
1NZ-FE	2007-	1,496 cc (1.496 L; 91.3 cu in)	I4	110 PS (81 kW; 108 hp) at 6000	143 N⋅m (105 lb⋅ft) at 4400
2ZR-FAE	2007-	1,797 cc (1.797 L; 109.7 cu in)	I4	136 PS (100 kW; 134 hp) at 6000	175 N⋅m (129 lb⋅ft) at 4400

=== Transmissions ===
Model(s)	Type
1.5G, 1.5X	Super CVT-i
1.8S	Super CVT-i with 7-speed sport sequential shiftmatic

=== Safety ===
ANCAP test results* Toyota Rukus (2010)
Test	Score
Overall	5 /5 stars
Frontal offset	12.61/16
Side impact	16/16
Pole	2/2
Seat belt reminders	2/3
Whiplash protection	Not Assessed
Pedestrian protection	Adequate
Electronic stability control	Standard

== Limited editions and packages ==
=== Aerotourer Chocolate ===
The Toyota Corolla Rumion Aerotourer Chocolate is a limited edition of 1.5X, 1.5G, and 1.8S painted Maroon Mica, a chocolate-like shade of brown. The Corolla Rumion Aerotourer Chocolate edition went on sale on 21 January 2008.

=== Aerotourer Sora ===
The Toyota Corolla Rumion Aerotourer Sora is a limited edition of 1.5G Aero Tourer and 1.8S Aero Tourer with Light Blue Mica Metallic body, Super White II-colored aero parts (front spoiler, side mudguard, rear bumpers, rear roof spoiler), two-tone interior (Light Blue Mica Metallic with Super White II meter borders). The Corolla Rumion Aerotourer Sora edition went on sale on 6 May 2008.

=== 1.8S/1.5G “Smart Package” ===
The 1.8S/1.5G “Smart Package” is an equipment package keyless entry, engine start/stop switch, engine immobilizer. Optional features (standard on 1.8S) include high intensity discharge head lamp, driver side arm rest.

== Production ==
The Toyota Corolla Rumion was built in the Iwate plant of Kanto Auto Works. Toyota stopped exporting the Scion xB to the North American market in 2015 as it was replaced by the iM, which is a rebadged second generation Auris, which was rebranded as the Corolla iM from August 2016 for the 2017 model year since the Scion brand was discontinued.

== Gallery ==
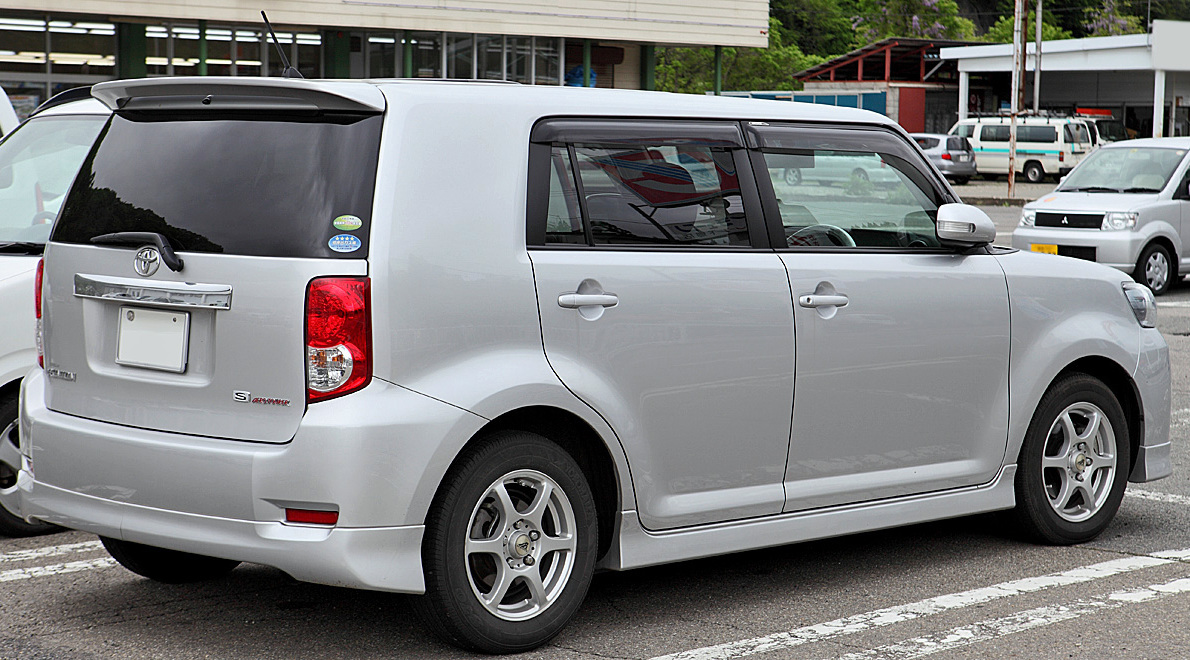
Corolla Rumion 1.8 S Aero Tourer (rear view)

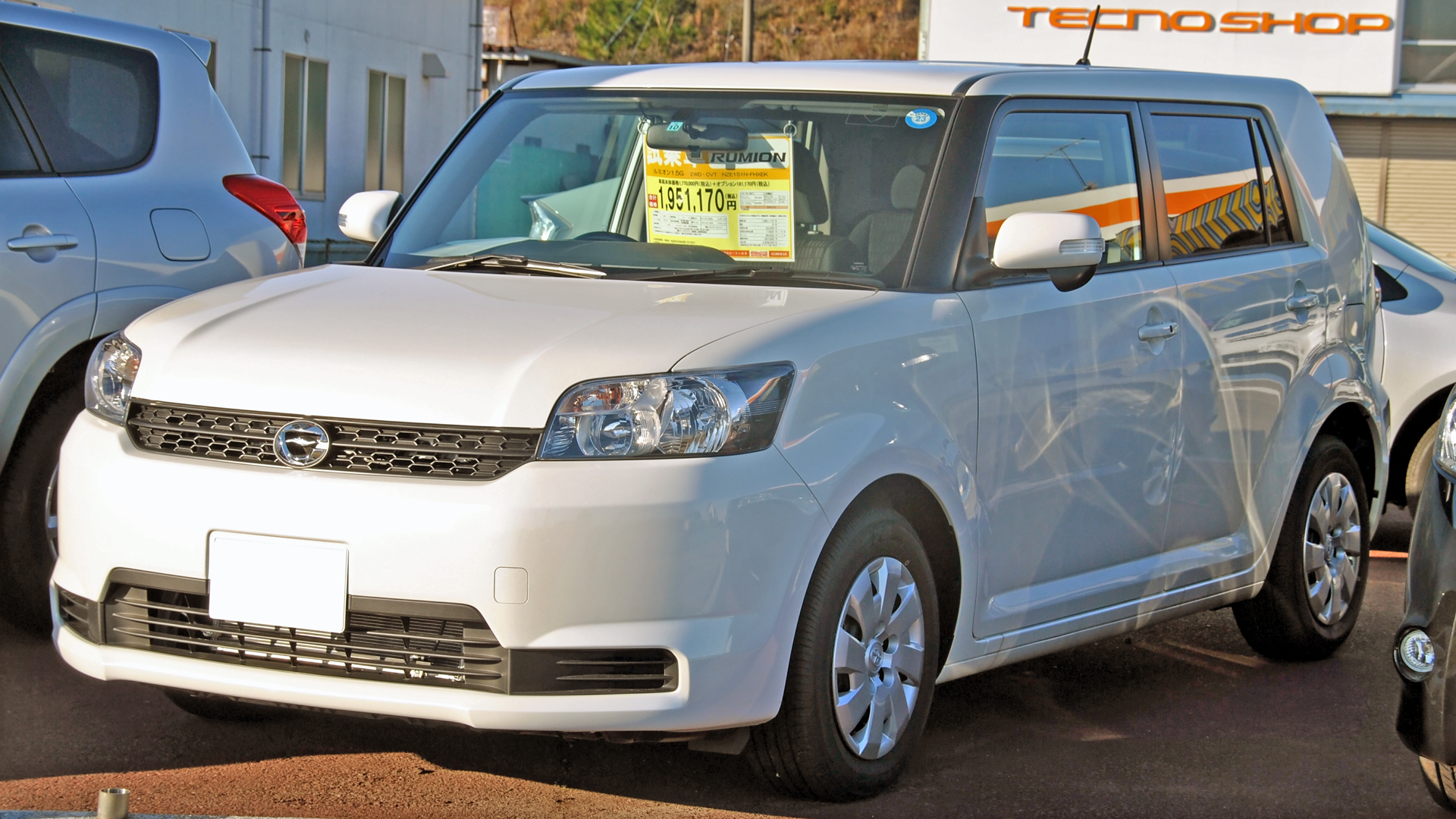
Corolla Rumion 1.5 G (facelift)

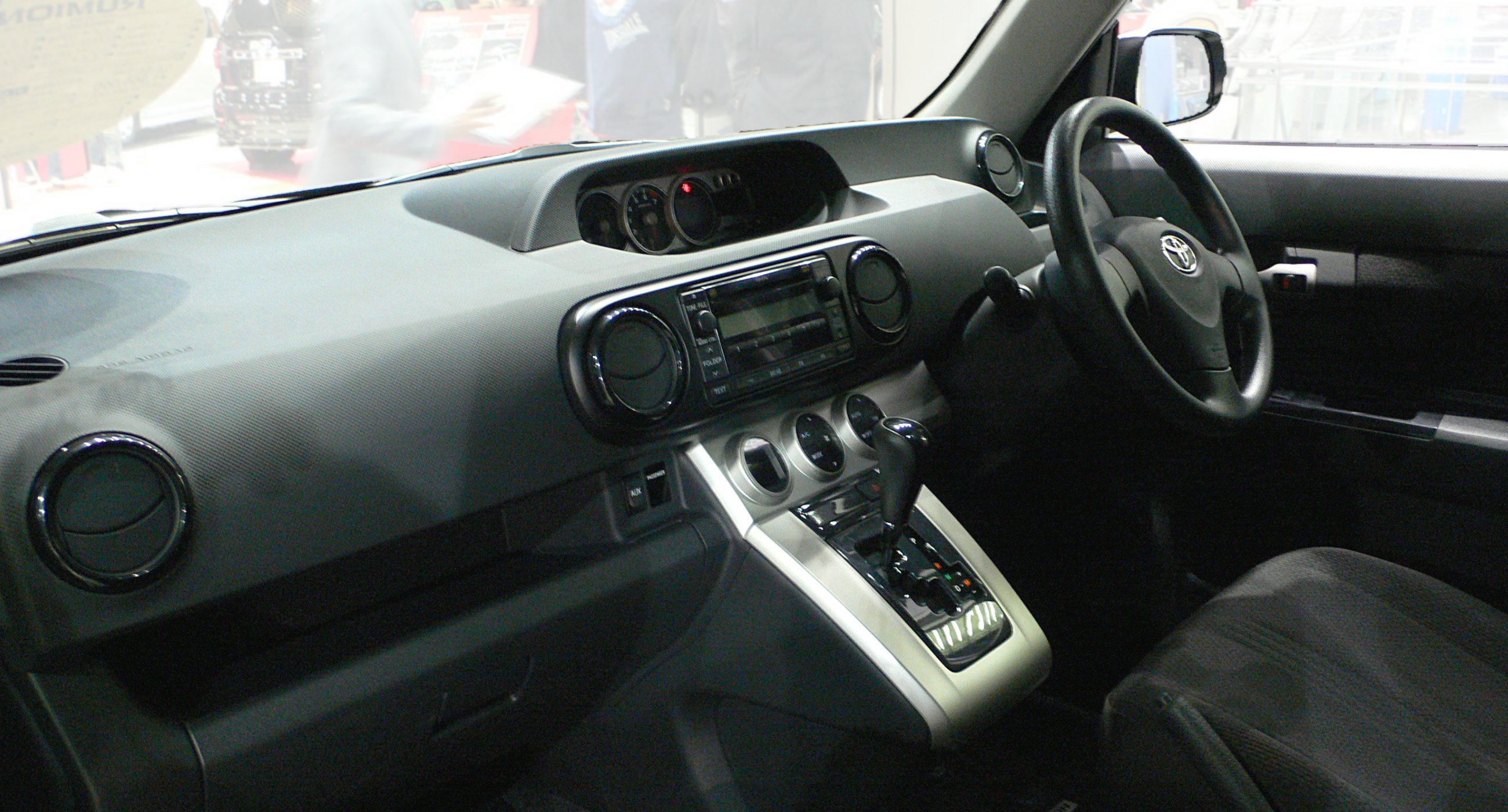
Interior

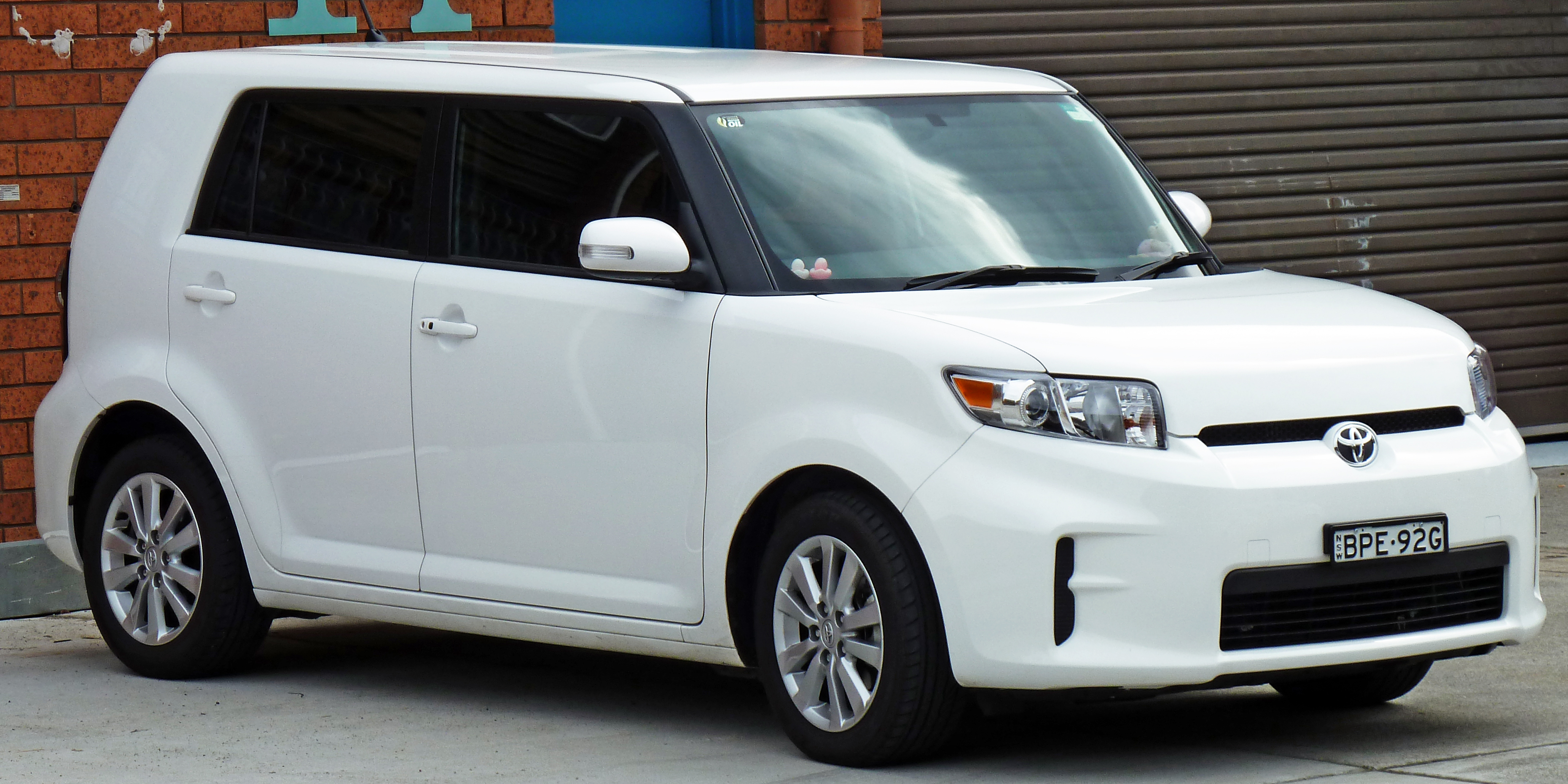
Toyota Rukus (Australia)

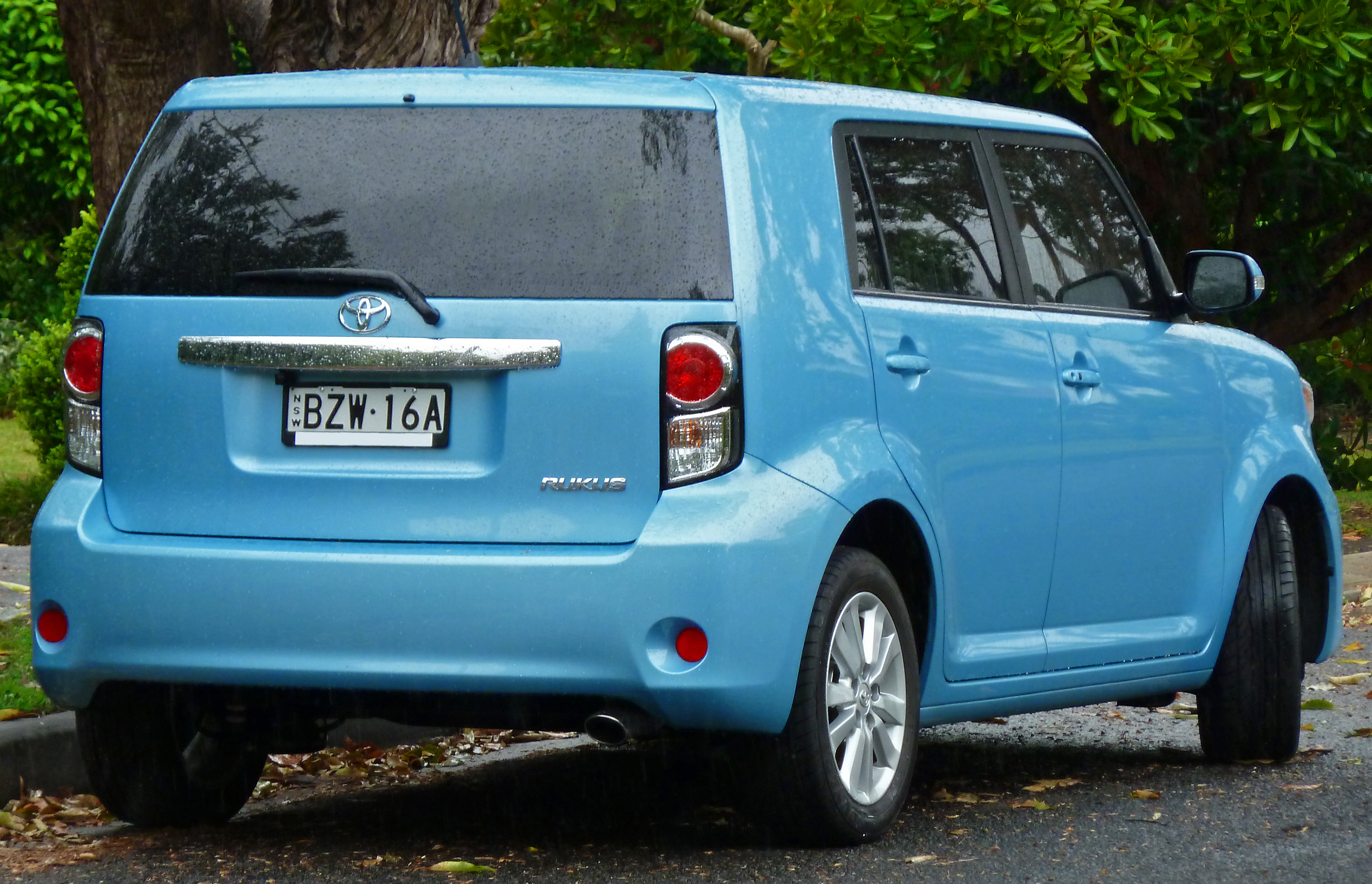
Toyota Rukus (Australia)
