= Scion xB =

Japanese compact hatchback

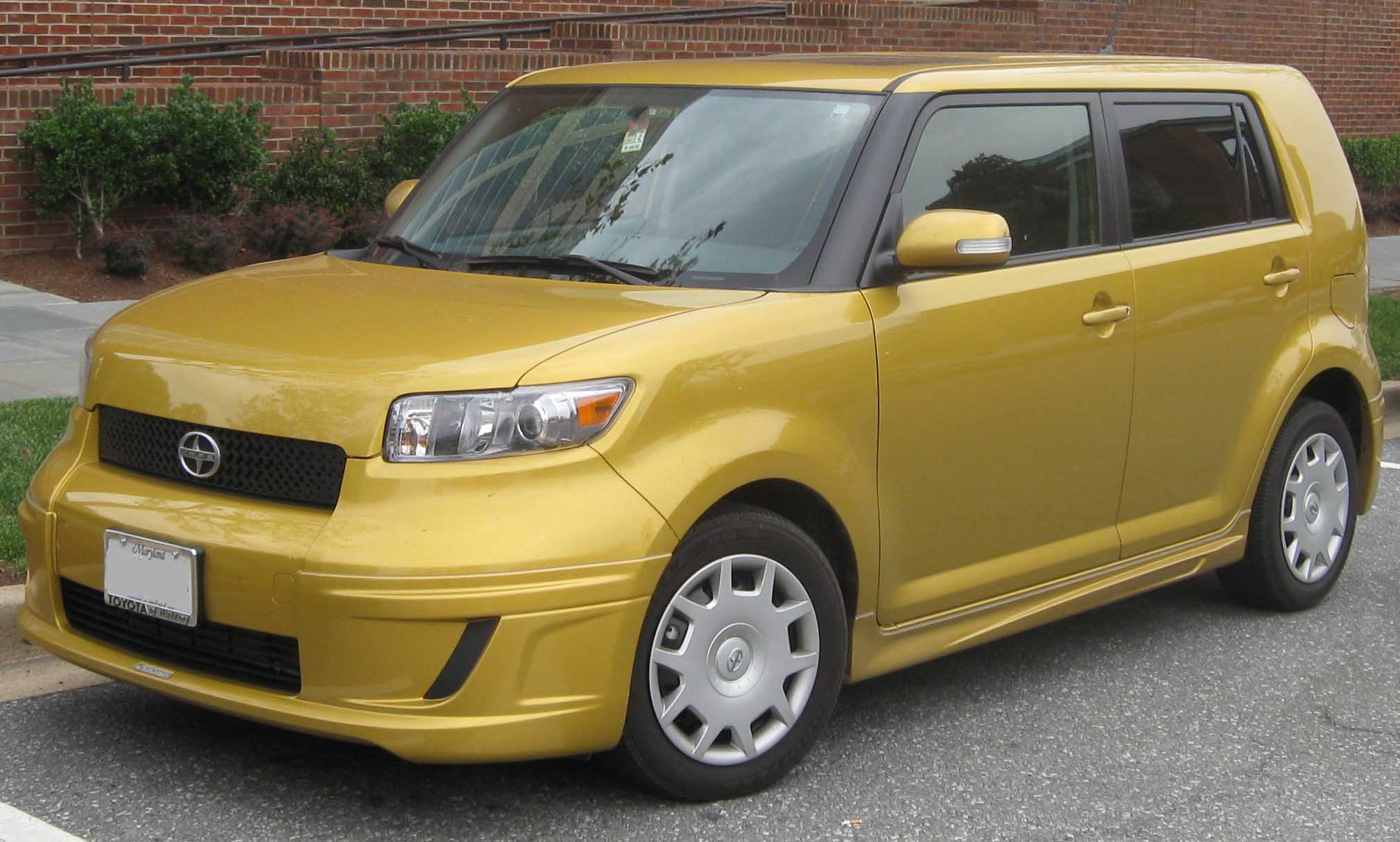
- 2008 Scion xB

Overview
- Manufacturer: Toyota
- Also called: Toyota bB (2003–2006); Toyota Corolla Rumion (2007–2015); Toyota Rukus (2010–2015)
- Production: June 2003 – December 2015
- Model years: 2004–2015

Body and chassis
- Class: Subcompact car (2003–2006); Compact car (2007–2015)
- Body style: 5-door hatchback
- Layout: FF layout

Chronology
- Successor: Scion iM/Toyota Corolla iM

The Scion xB is a five-door compact hatchback that was produced by Scion, a marque of Toyota. Produced from the 2004 to 2015 model years, it was one of the two launch models of the Scion marque, alongside the Scion xA.

The first-generation xB was a rebadged version of the subcompact Toyota bB designed for the American market, with marketing and options appealing to a young adult demographic as part of Scion's overall positioning. In 2007, Scion launched a second-generation xB, which was retooled as a compact car based on the E150 series Corolla; this model would also be sold internationally as the Toyota Corolla Rumion in Japan and the Toyota Rukus in Australia.

== First generation (XP30; 2003) ==
First generation (XP30)
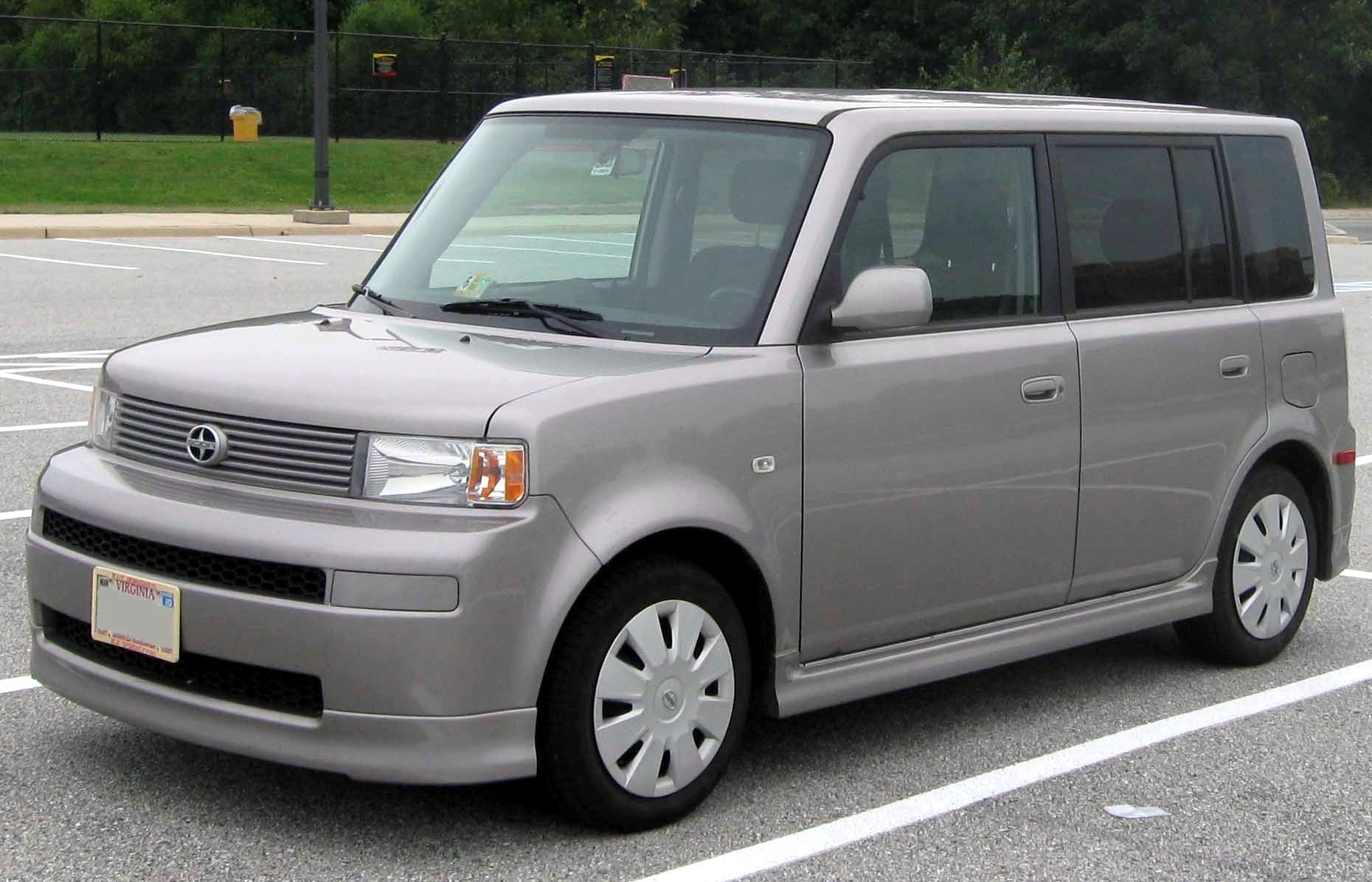

Overview
- Also called: Toyota bB
- Production: June 2003 – December 2006
- Model years: 2004–2006
- Assembly: Toyota, Aichi, Japan

Body and chassis
- Class: Subcompact car
- Body style: 5-door hatchback
- Platform: Toyota NBC platform
- Related: Toyota Vitz (XP10); Toyota ist/Scion xA (XP60); Toyota Platz (XP10)

Powertrain
- Engine: 1.3 L 2NZ-FE I4 (bB only); 1.5 L 1NZ-FE I4
- Transmission: 5-speed manual; 4-speed automatic

Dimensions
- Wheelbase: 2,500 mm (98.4 in)
- Length: 155.3 in (3,945 mm)
- Width: 66.5 in (1,689 mm)
- Height: 64.6 in (1,641 mm)
- Curb weight: 1,086 kg (2,395 lb); GVWR: 1,504 kg (3,315 lb)

The first-generation xB was a lightly modified and rebadged version of the Japanese-market subcompact Toyota bB. It was a small hatchback based on the Toyota Echo/Yaris platform. The xB was one of two models in the lineup of Toyota's US-exclusive Scion marque present at the brand's 2003 launch, the other being the xA, based on the Toyota Ist.

=== Scion bbX (2002) ===
The first-generation xB was previewed by the bbX concept car, revealed alongside the ccX concept for the Scion brand's public debut in April 2002 at the New York International Auto Show. The concept car has very few differences from the production xB, it being a Scion-badged version of the Toyota bB with performance and minor cosmetic modifications.

=== First-generation xB vs. first-generation bB ===
Only the first-generation models for both the xB and bB are related. Second-generation models are based upon different platforms.

To create the first-generation xB, the bB was modified from right- to left-hand drive, the front passenger area was also changed significantly with the bB's front bench seat replaced with bucket seats and the column-mounted shifter changed to a floor-mounted shifter.

The available drivetrains also differed. The bB was available with either the 1.3 L straight-four 2NZ-FE engine or the 1.5 L 1NZ-FE, mated exclusively to a 4-speed automatic transmission with available all wheel drive. The xB was only available with the 1NZ-FE that produced 108 hp (81 kW) and 105 lb⋅ft (142 N⋅m) in US spec, but offered both a 4-speed automatic or a 5-speed manual transmission. All-wheel drive was not offered on the xB.

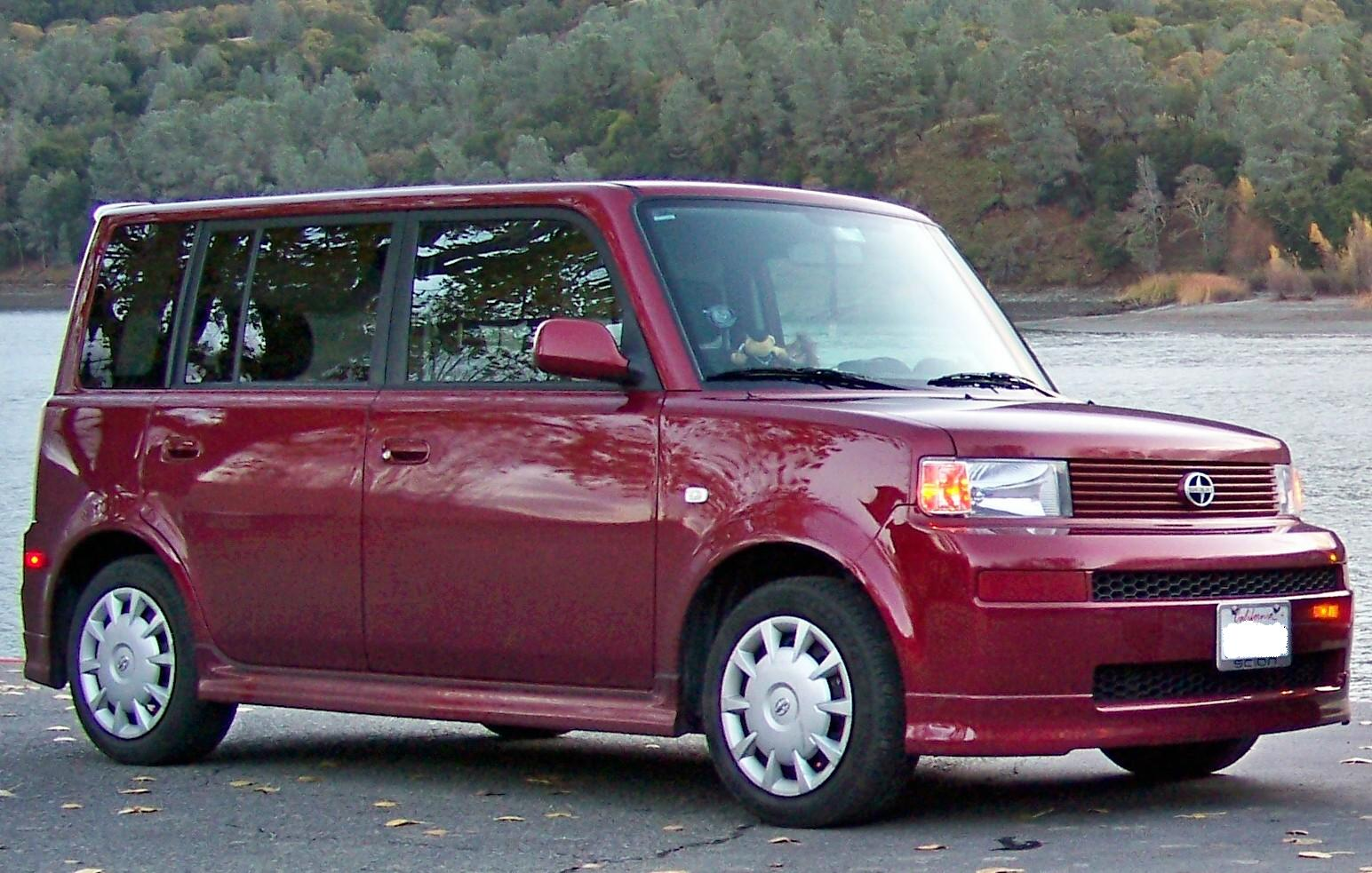
2006 Scion xB

The Toyota bB was equipped with a compact spare tire under the floor of the luggage area. On the Scion xB, a compact spare tire was stored under the left side of a raised rear cargo floor. Since the spare tire raised the cargo floor by several inches, a storage bin was added to the right of the spare tire to reclaim some of the lost storage space. A jack was stored under the driver's seat of the xB.

The Toyota bB had a pull-out storage tray under the passenger seat that the xB lacks.

The bB went on sale in February 2000, whereas the xB went on sale in June 2003 for the 2004 model year. Sales of the first-generation bB ended in December 2005, whereas the first-generation xB ended sales in June 2007.

=== Scion t2B (2005) ===
Scion t2B concept

Scion t2B (Tall-Two Box) is a concept hatchback designed by Calty Design Research and built by Five Axis Models in Huntington Beach, California, with interior design by Calty senior designer Bill Chergosky and Naoki Hamajima. The 5-door hatchback included a 2.4-liter I4 engine, 4-speed automatic transmission, 14-inch brakes with slotted rotors, 20-inch billet aluminium wheels, LED fog lamp, remotely operated power rear hatch, asymmetrical tri-level instrument panel features a large information ticker, MP3 docking station, dual moonroof, half-length suicide doors.

The vehicle was unveiled at the 2005 New York Auto Show.

=== Release Series vehicles ===
The xB, like the xA and tC, was also available in a "Release Series" for each of its model years. These came with limited-edition paint colors, matching seat colors, and special modifications such as DVD players, custom tail lights, special wheels or wheel covers, and other accessories, to make the RS different from the others. All Scion RS' receive special badges indicating the serial number. Limited Edition vehicles were, from a marketing standpoint, used to create a buzz for the brand name, with their exterior colors tending toward loud or bright hues (i.e. orange, yellow, red, blue, green). Scion's "Pure Price" program requires dealerships to sell the vehicle at the advertised price. Resale values of Release Series vehicles command a premium because of their packaged options and scarcity.

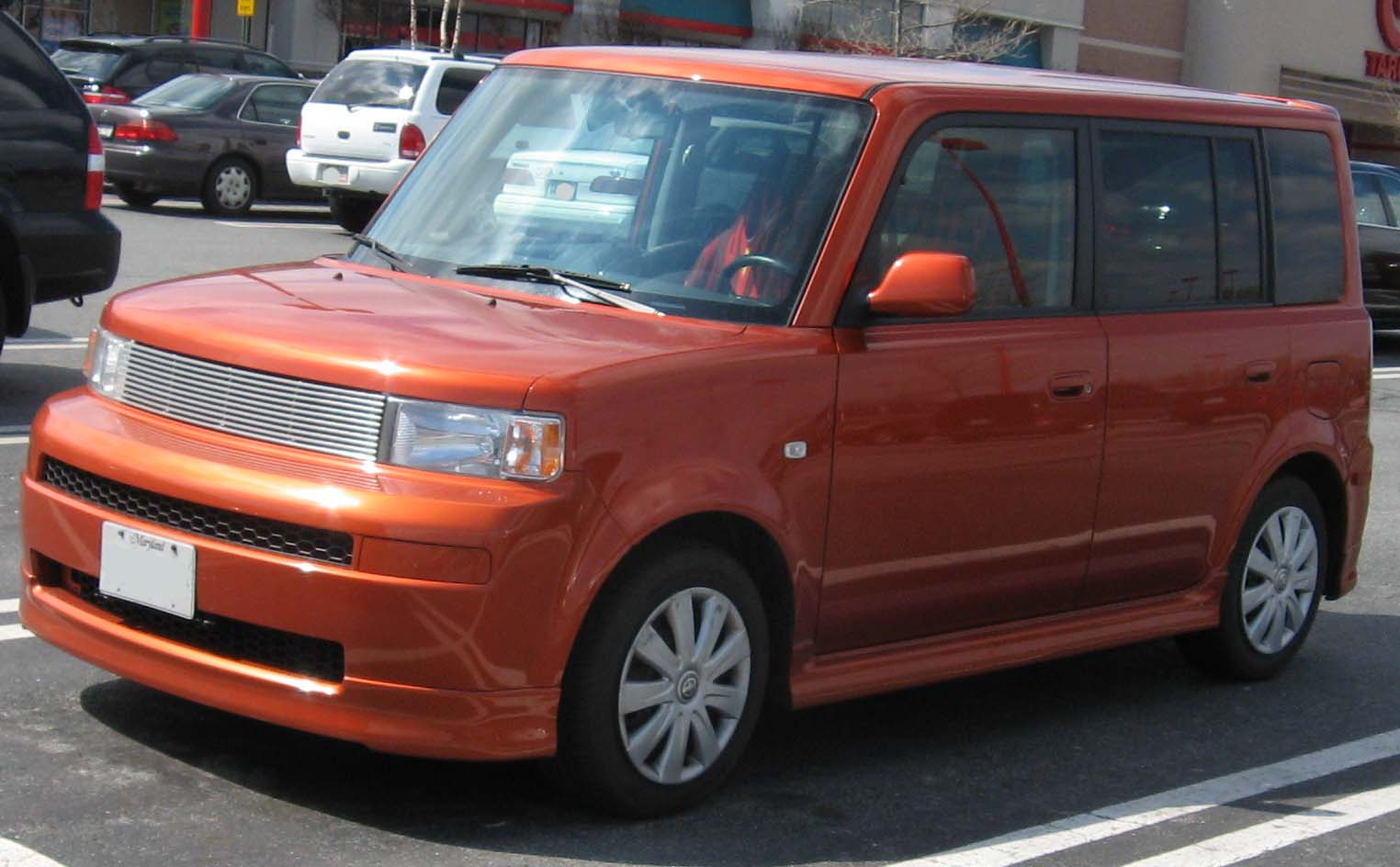
2004 Scion xB RS 1.0, Hot Lava Orange

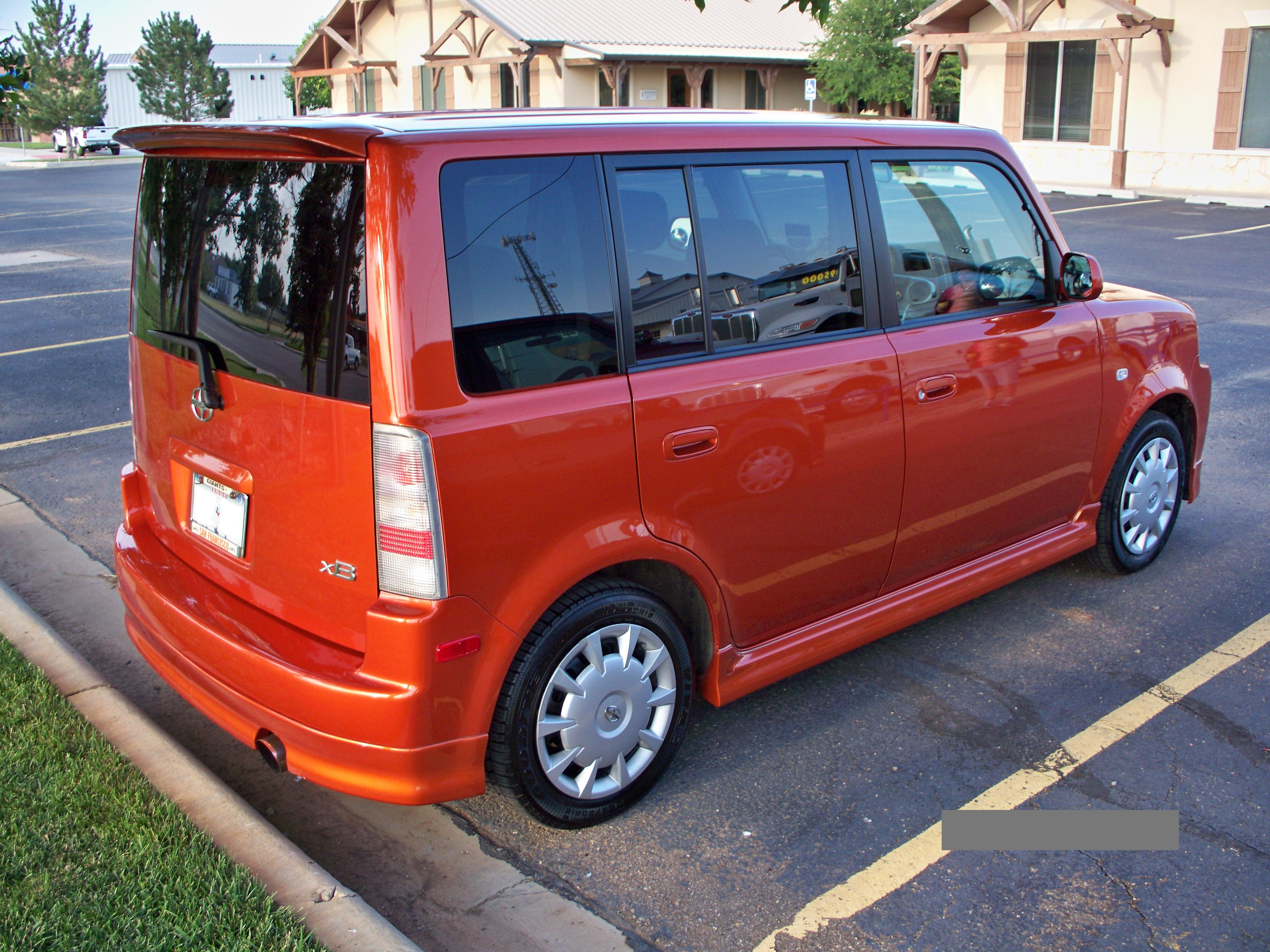
Rear view of RS 1.0

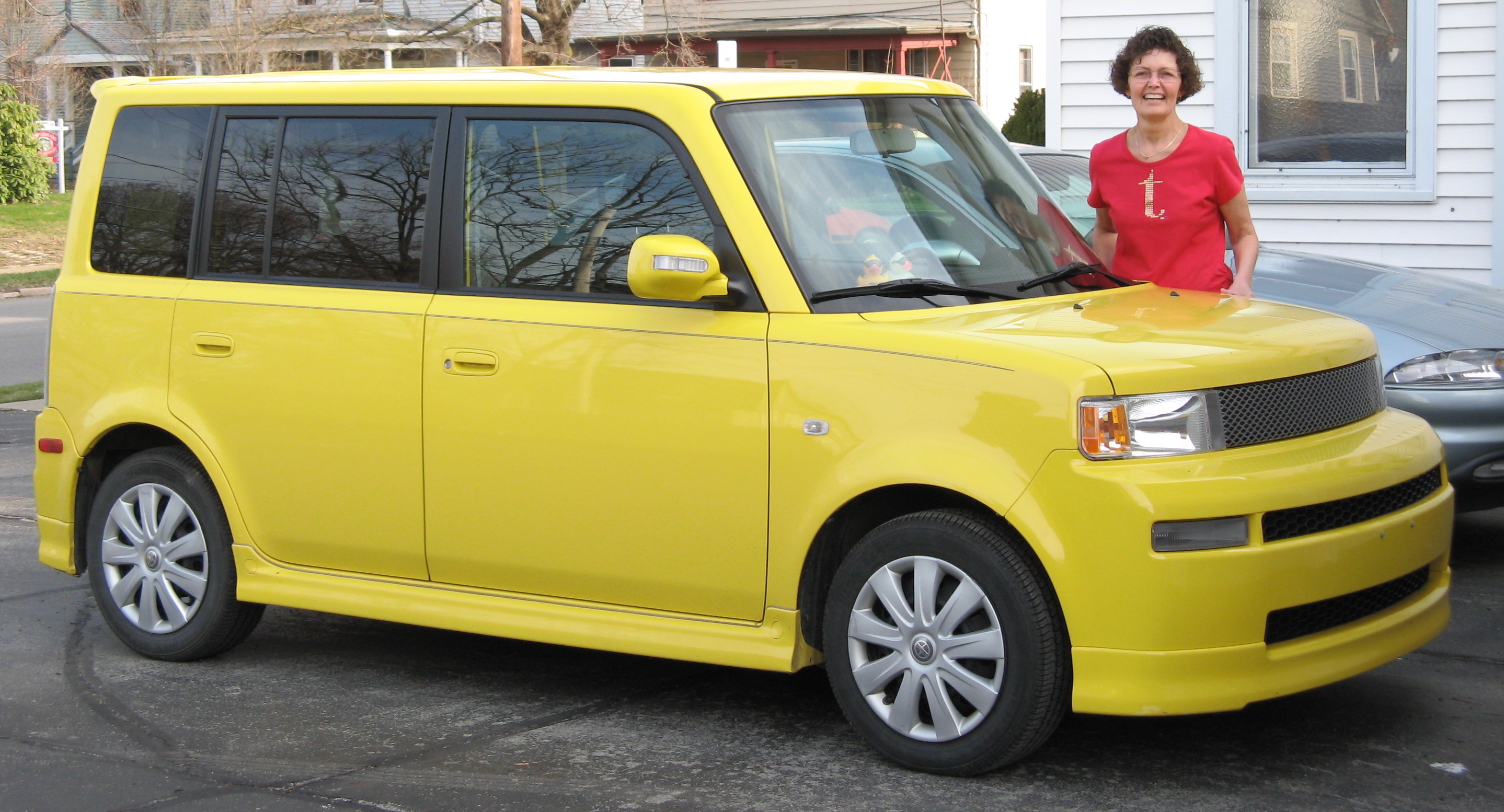
2005 Scion xB RS 2.0, in Solar Yellow

2004 model year – xB RS 1.0
Only available in Hot Lava Orange with 2100 units produced (504 5-speed units, 1596 automatics). The xB Release Series 1.0 comes with some unique features from the factory which include Hot Lava paint, color-keyed rear spoiler, matching orange powder-coated strut tie-bar, custom grille, color tuned interior and under-seat & dash orange illumination.
2005 model year – xB RS 2.0
Only available in Solar Yellow with 2500 units produced. This RS edition came with color keyed side mirror overlays with LED turn signals, rear spoiler, tunable stainless steel sport muffler, and a metal mesh grille. Inside there are stainless appliqués on the door sills, and yellow upholstery accents to match the exterior, and a plaque that shows the build number xxxx/2500. The RS 2.0 added $1,375 to the MSRP.
2006 model year – xB RS 3.0
Only available in Envy Green with 2200 units produced. RS 3.0 changes include Envy Green paint, seven-spoke wheel coverings, and rear spoiler. Standard features include Alpine DVD audio/video system instead of the usual "Pioneer" radio; iPod connectivity; headrest entertainment system; a special steering wheel featuring a few buttons; which was later a standard feature between mid 2006 to earliest 2007. The vehicle also had a special grille, only on the RS 3.0, with the color matching the car, Envy Green; and a radar intrusion sensor. The 2,200 vehicles also received numbered badging. The RS 3.0 added $2,310 to the MSRP price.
2006 – xB RS 4.0
Only available in a Torched Penny called Maziora, a line of polarized paints made by Japan's Nippon Paint Co. is a (polarized goldish-brown) with 2500 units produced. The Release Series 4.0 is painted in a three-part Maziora Torched Penny paint, which is a color-shifting finish that changes depending on the viewing angle and/or how light plays off the car's surface. In this case, the colors morph into shades of brown, bronze, and gold. In addition to the special paint, the RS 4.0 received a rear spoiler, Modellista grille, and rear bumper protector and everything is color-keyed. Inside, the floor mats are embroidered reading "Release Series". It also got multicolor dash lighting, a new shift knob and a numbered plaque xxxx/2500.

=== Safety ===
The first generation received a "Good" overall score in the frontal offset test, all measured categories in this test were also rated "Good". The xB was given a "Poor" overall score in the side impact test. The xB model year 2003–2006 did not offer side airbags but includes them for model year 2008–2015.

== Second generation (E150; 2007) ==
Second generation (E150)
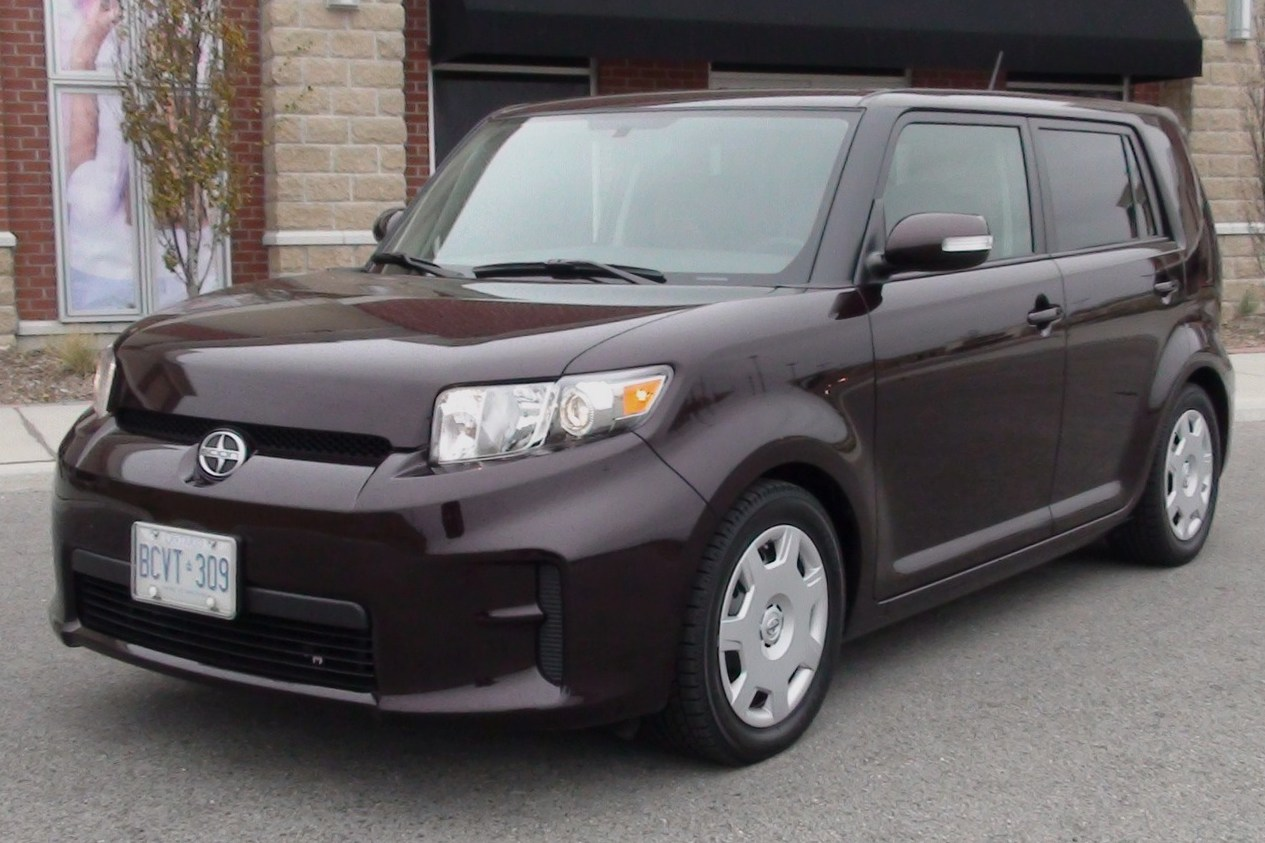

Overview
- Also called: Toyota Corolla Rumion; Toyota Rukus (Australia)
- Production: 2007–2015
- Model years: 2008–2015
- Assembly: Japan: Kanegasaki, Iwate (Kanto Auto Works); Japan: Toyota, Aichi (Takaoka plant)
- Designer: Hiroaki Suzuki (2005)

Body and chassis
- Class: Compact car
- Body style: 5-door hatchback
- Platform: Toyota New MC platform
- Related: Toyota Corolla (E140); Toyota Auris

Powertrain
- Engine: 1.5 L 1NZ-FE I4 (Rumion); 1.8 L 2ZR-FAE I4 (Rumion); 2.4 L 2AZ-FE I4
- Transmission: 5-speed E351 manual transmission; 4-speed U241E automatic transmission

Dimensions
- Wheelbase: 2,600 mm (102.4 in)
- Length: 4,250 mm (167.3 in)
- Width: 1,760 mm (69.3 in)
- Height: 1,610 mm (63.4 in)
- Curb weight: 1,373 kg (3,027 lb) (manual); 1,399 kg (3,084 lb) (automatic)

The second-generation Scion xB is styled as a 5-door hatchback of the t2B concept. Toyota unveiled the production xB at the 2007 Chicago Auto Show. The new xB was rounder in shape and larger than its predecessor. The 2008 model year xB is 2.8-inch (71 mm) wider, 12-inch (300 mm) longer - including 4-inch (100 mm) longer wheel to wheel - and 600 pounds (270 kg) heavier than the first-generation xB.

The first-generation Scion xB (being a rebadge of the original Toyota bB) was based on the Yaris platform, but the second-generation xB was based on the new Corolla's platform. Design changes were said to be based on American buyers' "wants" relative to the first-generation.

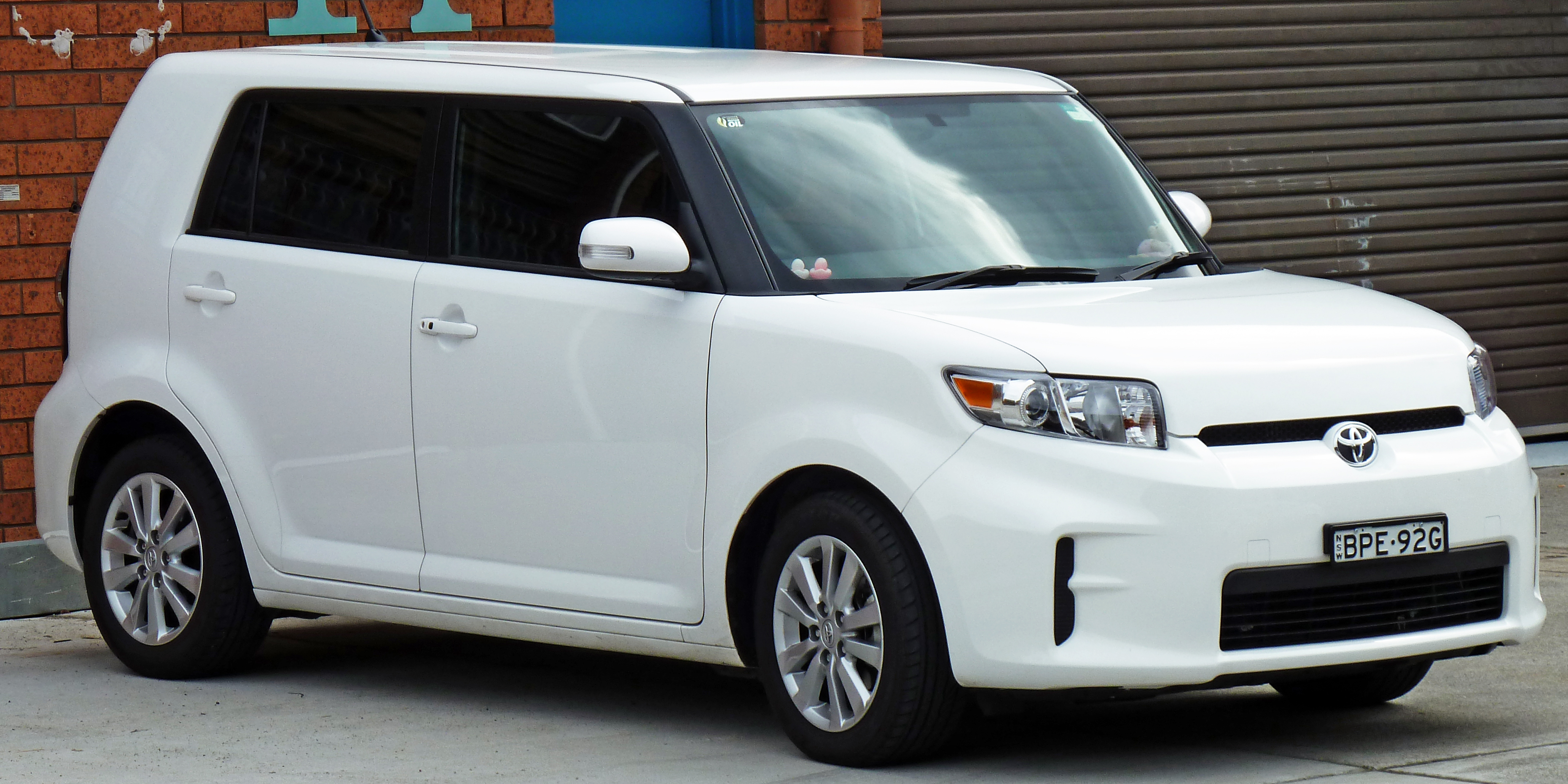
Toyota Rukus, Australia

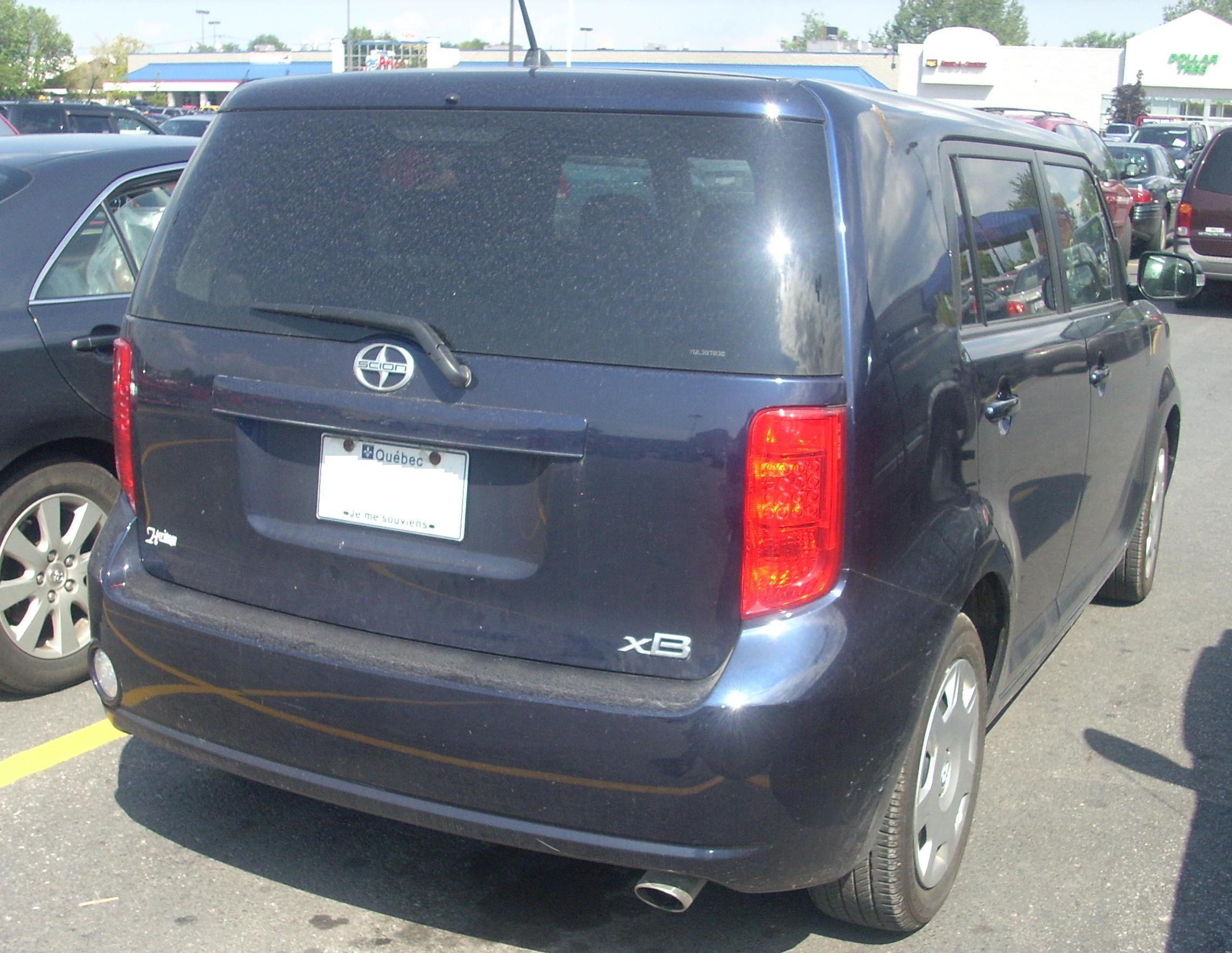
Scion xB

The Scion xB was produced by Kanto Auto Works, Ltd. based in Japan. Due to the 2011 Japanese earthquake, production was suspended from 14 March 2011 to 18 April 2011, affecting several Toyota vehicles, including the Scion xB and Scion xD. Plants affected by the disaster included the Toyota Motor Hokkaido Plant, the Toyota Motor Tohoku Plant, and the Central Motor Corporation Miyagi Plant, which produces the Toyota Yaris.

The second-generation xB is equipped with a 2.4 L straight-4 Toyota 2AZ-FE engine rated at 158 hp (118 kW) and 162 lb⋅ft (220 N⋅m), shared with the first-generation tC and the Toyota Camry, which at 22 mpg_{‑US} (11 L/100 km; 26 mpg_{‑imp}) city / 28 mpg_{‑US} (8.4 L/100 km; 34 mpg_{‑imp}) hwy has a higher fuel consumption than the previous model's 1.5 L engine (26 mpg_{‑US} (9.0 L/100 km; 31 mpg_{‑imp}) city / 31 mpg_{‑US} (7.6 L/100 km; 37 mpg_{‑imp}) hwy). A five-speed manual and a sequential-shift four-speed automatic are the only factory options aside from the color and stereo.

A choice of three new head units is available on all 2008 Scions. All sound systems feature six speakers and standard iPod connectivity. The base head unit has MP3, WMA, and AAC CD compatibility and Scion's SSP equalizer presets. The base unit can also be set to any of three Scion model presets (xB, xD, or tC) and includes an "Automatic Sound Levelizer" feature that automatically increases the volume as the vehicle speed and ambient noise increases. The Premium head unit features a small LCD that can display pictures and movies downloaded from Pioneer's website in addition to the features on the base unit. A navigation system is also available. The SNS 100 system can play DVD movies in addition to GPS functionality and the features of the base system, aside from the backlit color choices.

All xBs come standard with four-wheel anti-lock brakes, brake assist, electronic brakeforce distribution, Vehicle Stability Control driver and front passenger dual stage airbags, front seat-mounted side torso airbags, front and rear side curtain airbags, and a first-aid kit.

In 2013, the xB was chosen by cars.com as a Top 10 Best Base Model.

=== Model year changes ===
Scion announced in March 2010 that the 2011 model, on sale late March 2010, is being given a facelift. Two new colors are available, and there are minor changes to the exterior body, including a revised front and rear bumper, new front grille, and new headlights and tail lights. The interior changes include a revised gauge cluster, center console and new driver and front passenger seats with new materials. The MSRP rises US$150 to US$16,000 for the manual and US$16,950 for the automatic transmission. In addition, the Scion xB went on sale in Canada for the first time along with the entire Scion lineup. In 2011, for the 2012 model year, a new radio with bluetooth became standard.

For the 2013 model year, Scion made a few enhancements including remodeled front and rear bumpers and a few interior upgrades including the optional BeSpoke radio. New colors are Absolutely Red and Nautical Blue Metallic (Absolutely Red was available in 2009 as RS 6.0). Stingray Metallic and Elusive Blue Metallic colors were dropped (Stingray Metallic was a very expensive color and Toyota no longer offers it on any model). Sales of the 2013 model began in February 2013.

Sales for the 2014 model began in December 2013. No major changes for this model year. All models now come with a standard Scion 6.1-inch display touch screen audio system. Sales for the 2015 model began in December 2014. For the new model year, Scion added a standard backup camera to the xB as well as continuing the updates for 2014.

The Scion xB, along with the Toyota Matrix, was replaced by the second generation Toyota Auris-based Scion iM, which launched in April 2015 for the 2016 model year. Due to the discontinuation of the Scion marque, the Scion iM was re-branded as the Toyota Corolla iM for the 2017 model year. The equivalent Australian-market Toyota Rukus was discontinued in October 2015 and the Japanese-market Toyota Corolla Rumion was discontinued in December 2015.

=== Safety ===
The second-generation Scion xB has won the Top Safety Pick award by the Insurance Institute for Highway Safety (IIHS) for six years in a row. It received an overall "Good" score in the Insurance Institute for Highway Safety frontal offset crash test, and another "Good" overall score in the side impact crash test, with all nine measured categories also rated "Good". And a "Good" score in the roof strength test.

=== Awards ===
Car and Driver magazine rated the 2008 xB as one of the top ten safe vehicles under US$25,000.

=== Release Series vehicles ===
2008 model year – xB RS 5.0
Only available in Gold Rush Mica with 2500 units produced (second RS Scion other than the tC to have a sunroof).
2009 model year – xB RS 6.0

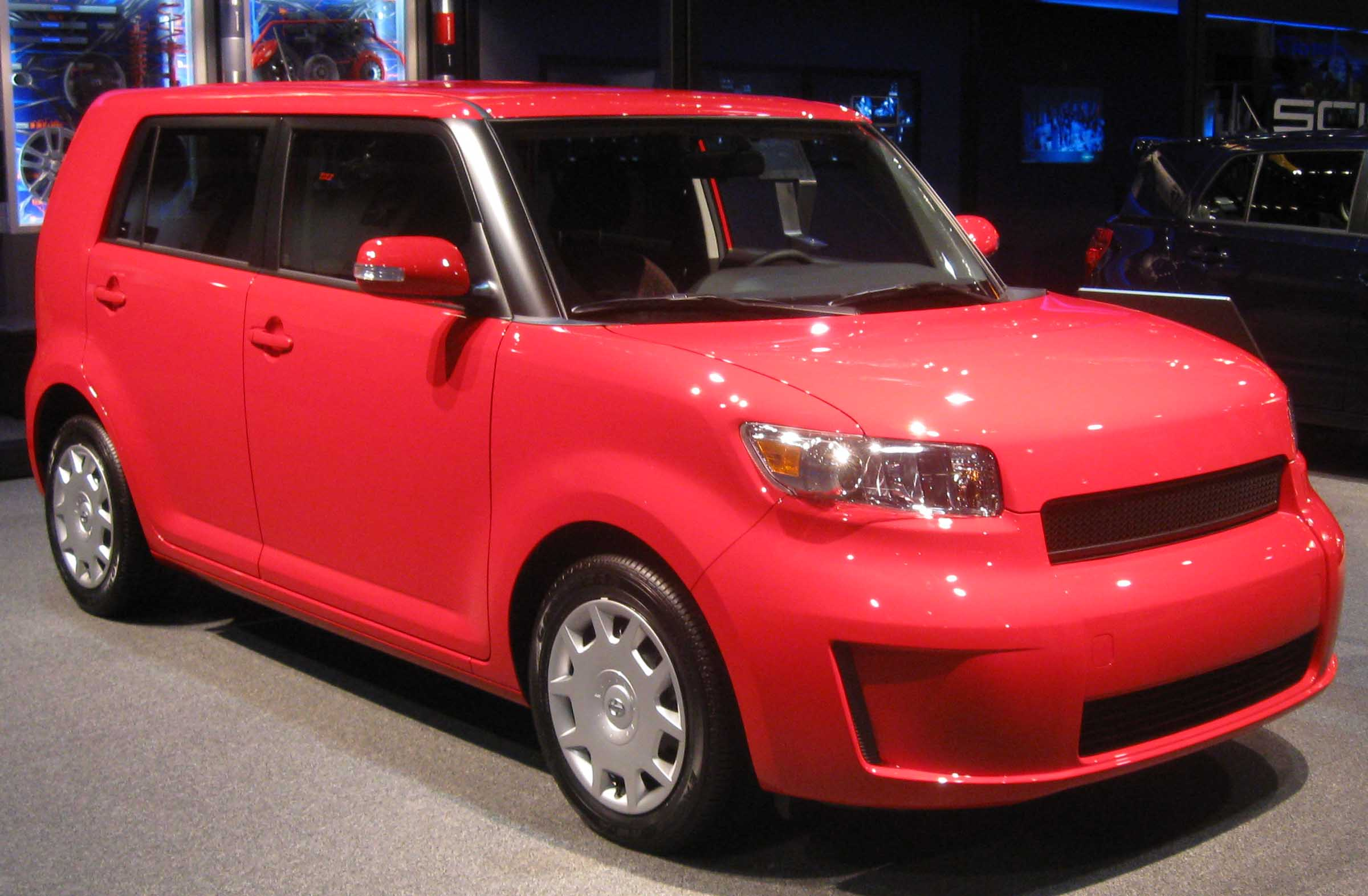
2009 xB RS 6.0

Only available in Absolutely Red with 2500 units produced. The RS 6.0 added $1,743 to the MSRP.
2010 model year – xB RS 7.0

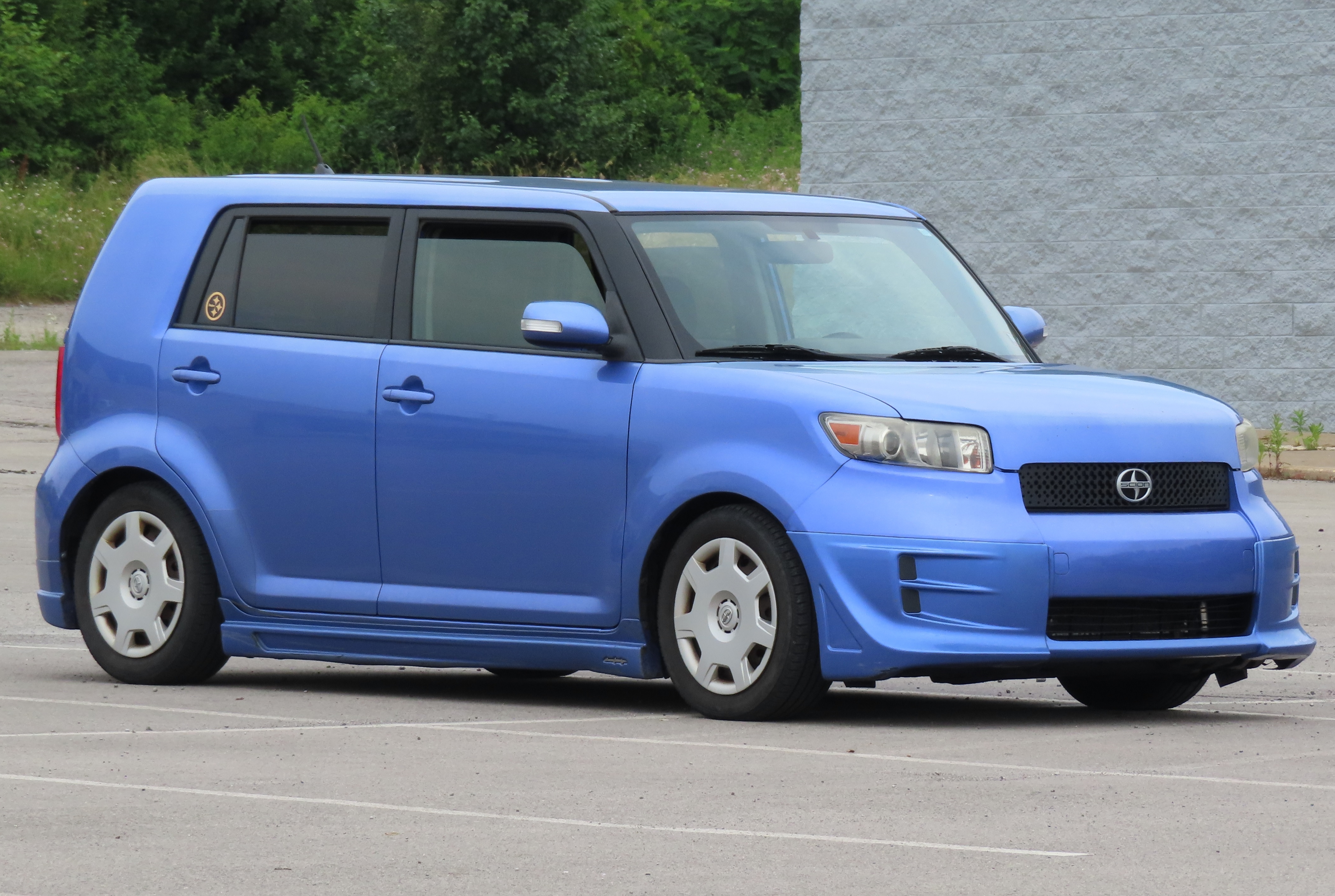
2010 xB RS 7.0

With a four-piece DAMD body kit, only available in Murasaki (Purple), with 2000 units produced. The RS 7.0 added $3000 to the base MSRP.
2011 model year – xB RS 8.0
With a four-piece Kenstyle body kit and sunroof, only available in Voodoo Blue, with 2000 units produced. The RS 8.0 added $2,405 to the MSRP.
2012 model year – xB RS 9.0
Only available in Hot Lava with 1500 units produced. The RS 9.0 added $1,810 to the MSRP.
2013 model year – xB 10 Series
Only available in Silver Ignition with 2100 units produced. Scion 10 Series models were built to celebrate the 10th anniversary of the Scion brand. The xB model includes unique Silver Ignition exterior color, illuminating exterior Scion badges (front and rear), Pioneer touch screen audio system, solar-charged illuminating shift knob, individually numbered interior badge, graphite finish 16" alloy wheels, and jack-knife keys. The 10 Series added $2,410 to the MSRP.
2014 model year – xB RS 10.0
Only available in Electric Quartz with 1500 units produced. Equipped with green Scion logo projection on the rear bumper, green Release Series logo and matching number projected on the front floor mats, wireless charging bin, green interior pattern, backup camera, Piano Black inserts and Tungsten wheel covers.
2015 model year – xB Parklan Edition
As a final sendoff to the xB line, Scion teamed with 686 Parklan to produce a "Parklan Edition" car. Limited to 686 copies, it was available only in Cocoa Bean Metallic paint color with red accent lines in the front, rear, and on the side mirrors. Included specially badged 16-inch black alloy wheels along with blacked-out door handles and rear license plate garnish.

=== Scion RIDE ===
It is a 1:18 Ridemakerz model based on the second-generation Scion xB. The body was available in Cannonball Black, Comet Blue and Wasabi Green.

The 7:8 full-sized concept and the toy were unveiled at the 2007 SEMA Show.

=== Toyota Corolla Rumion (E150N, 2007–2015) ===
A differently styled version for the Japanese market.

=== Toyota Rukus (2010–2015) ===
A differently styled version for the Australian market, with the 2.4l 2AZ-FE engine and a four-speed automatic gearbox, released June 2010.

== Electric vehicles ==
AC Propulsion has produced an electric version of the first-generation xB called the eBox.

Researchers at Carnegie Mellon University's Robotics Institute have converted a Scion xB into a commuter electric vehicle as part of their ChargeCar research project.

== Scion marketing ==
The Scion xB's marketing is aimed at Generation Y, defined roughly as people born between 1980 and 1994. This group of car buyers is extremely important to manufacturers due to their large numbers (78 million) and their differing perceptions and demands of the vehicles they drive. Despite the Scion xB's target market, the average age of an xB buyer was 46.

Although Toyota expected the xA to sell better than the xB, the reverse proved to be true, with the xB outselling its sibling 2 to 1.

== Sales ==
The Scion xB was Scion's most popular model in the United States until 2011, when it was surpassed by the tC. In the U.S., sales of the xB have been dropping after the introduction of the second generation, from a peak of over 60,000 to 17,017 in 2011.

Calendar Year	US	Australia
2003	6,936	N/A
2004	47,013	N/A
2005	54,037	N/A
2006	61,306	N/A
2007	45,834	N/A
2008	45,220	N/A
2009	25,461	N/A
2010	20,364	3867
2011	17,017	3867
2012	19,787	3867
2013	17,849	3867
2014	16,583	3867
2015	15,223	3867
2016	2,667	–

== Chinese copy ==
In 2009, Great Wall Motor of China released the Coolbear, which is a copy of the first-generation xB, but with a different front end.

== See also ==
- AC Propulsion eBox
