= Toyota bB =

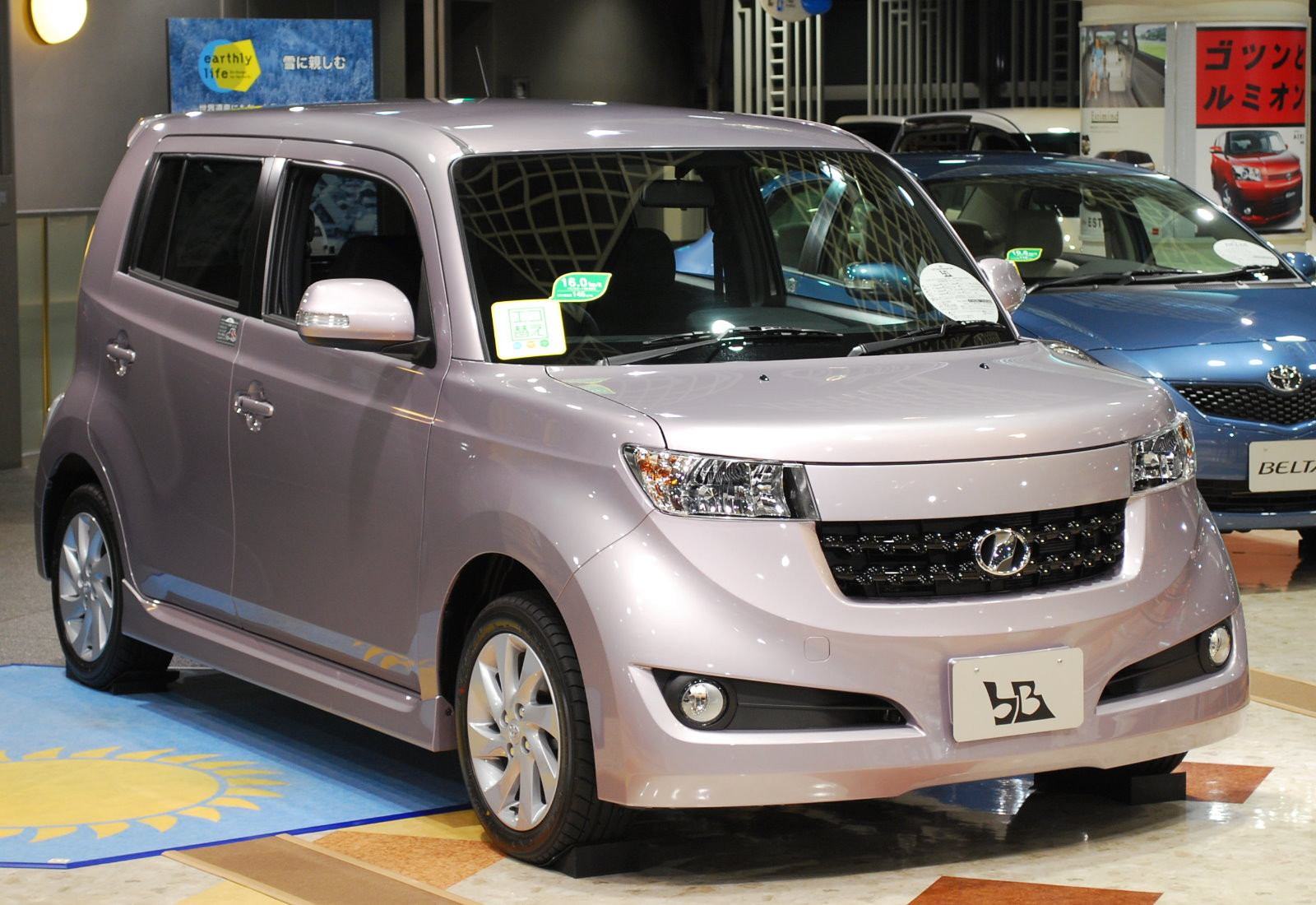
- Second generation Toyota bB (2008)

Overview
- Manufacturer: Toyota
- Also called: Scion xB (2003–2006); Daihatsu Coo/Materia (2006–2012); Subaru Dex (2006–2012)
- Production: January 2000 – May 2016

Body and chassis
- Class: Mini MPV
- Body style: 5-door hatchback; 3-door coupe utility (Japan only, first generation)
- Layout: Front-engine, front-wheel-drive; Four-wheel drive

Chronology
- Predecessor: Daihatsu YRV (Coo/Materia)
- Successor: Scion xB (E150) (North America, for XP30 model); Toyota Tank/Roomy (second generation bB); Daihatsu Thor (Coo/Materia); Subaru Justy (Dex)

The Toyota bB is a mini MPV produced by the Japanese car company Toyota. The first generation launched in 2000, and the second generation was jointly developed with Daihatsu from 2005.

The car has been badge engineered and sold as the Daihatsu Materia, Scion xB and Subaru Dex.

== First generation (XP30; 2000) ==
First generation (XP30)
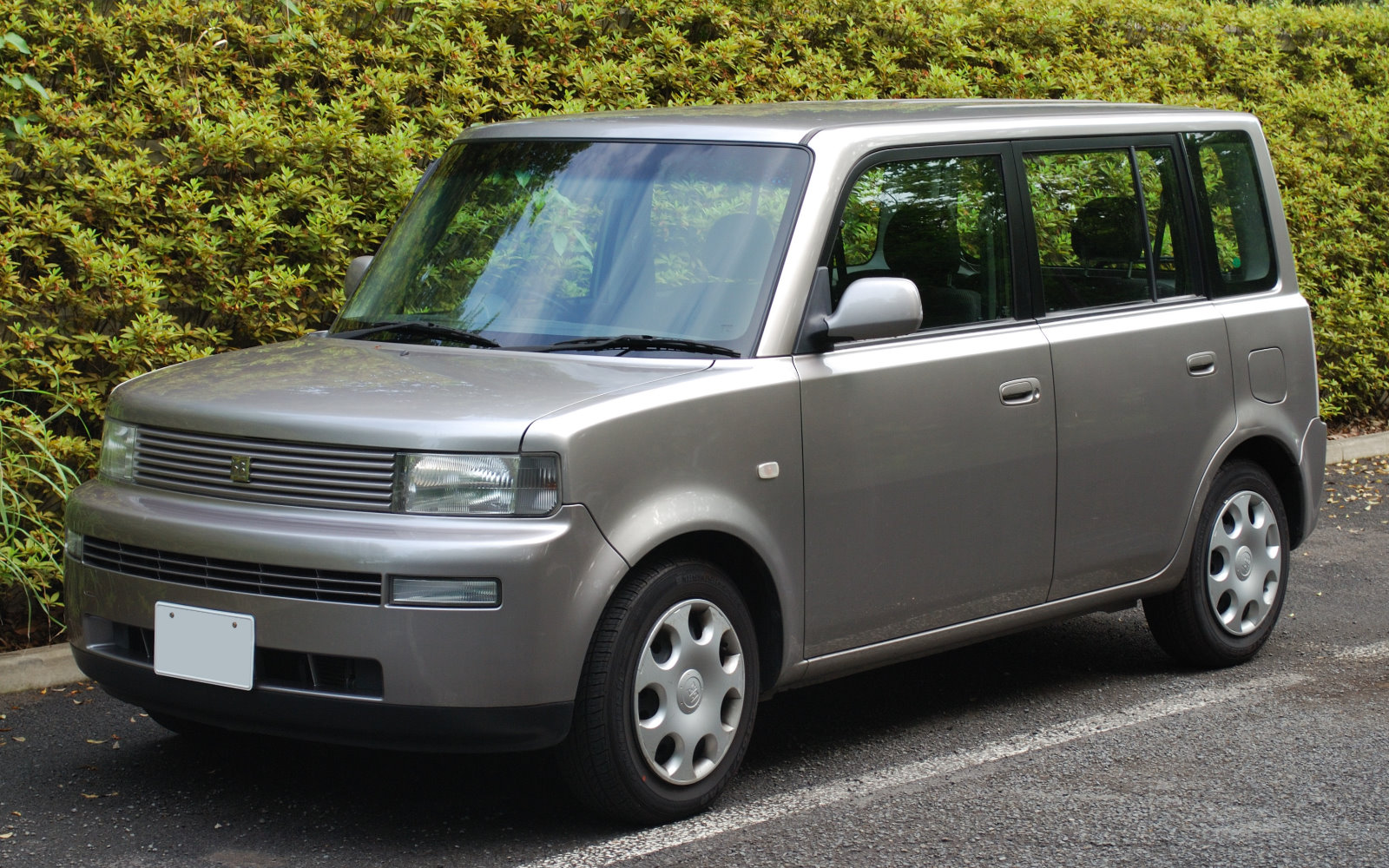

Overview
- Also called: Scion xB (North America)
- Production: January 2000 – December 2005
- Assembly: Japan: Toyota, Aichi (Takaoka plant)

Body and chassis
- Body style: 5-door hatchback; 2-door coupe utility (2001–2003)
- Platform: Toyota NBC platform
- Related: Toyota Vitz (XP10); Toyota ist (XP60)/Scion xA (XP60); Toyota Platz (XP10)

Powertrain
- Engine: 1.3 L 2NZ-FE I4; 1.5 L 1NZ-FE I4
- Transmission: 4-speed automatic

Dimensions
- Wheelbase: 2,500 mm (98.4 in)
- Length: 3,825–3,945 mm (150.6–155.3 in)
- Width: 1,690 mm (66.5 in)
- Height: 1,640–1,695 mm (64.6–66.7 in)
- Curb weight: 1,070–1,130 kg (2,359–2,491 lb)

The first generation bB was based on the Toyota Vitz and the development was led by Toyota chief engineer Tetsuya Tada. While the box-shaped mini MPV was initially targeted towards Japanese men in their twenties, it is also popular with women buyers.

Production of the bB occurred between January 2000 and April 2005 at the Takaoka plant in Toyota, Aichi. Production occurred at the former Central Motors between August 2004 and December 2005 for the bB; export Scion xB model continued until December 2006. In more recent years, the first and second-generation bB have been at least privately imported to the United Kingdom, Ireland, Australia and New Zealand.

The bB has also been offered in a variant tuned by TRD. It featured the same 1NZ-FE Turbo as the Vitz RS Turbo/TRD Turbo/GRMN Turbo. Unlike those, it is a dealer installed option and not a trim, just like with the ist TRD Turbo. It also has the same other enhancements like the ist, like TRD suspension, air filter, emblems, front brake pads and muffler.

=== Engines ===
Engine choices include 1.3- and 1.5-litre inline-four engines.

The Scion xB (XP30) came standard with the 1.5 litre inline-four engines.

=== Marketing ===
In the United States, the first generation bB was sold under the Scion brand as the xB from June 2003 to 2007.

For the Scion xB, the front passenger area was also changed significantly with the bB's front bench seat replaced with bucket seats and the column-mounted shifter changed to a floor-mounted shifter.

=== bB Open Deck (2001–2003) ===
The bB Open Deck was a coupe utility version of the bB.

=== Gallery ===
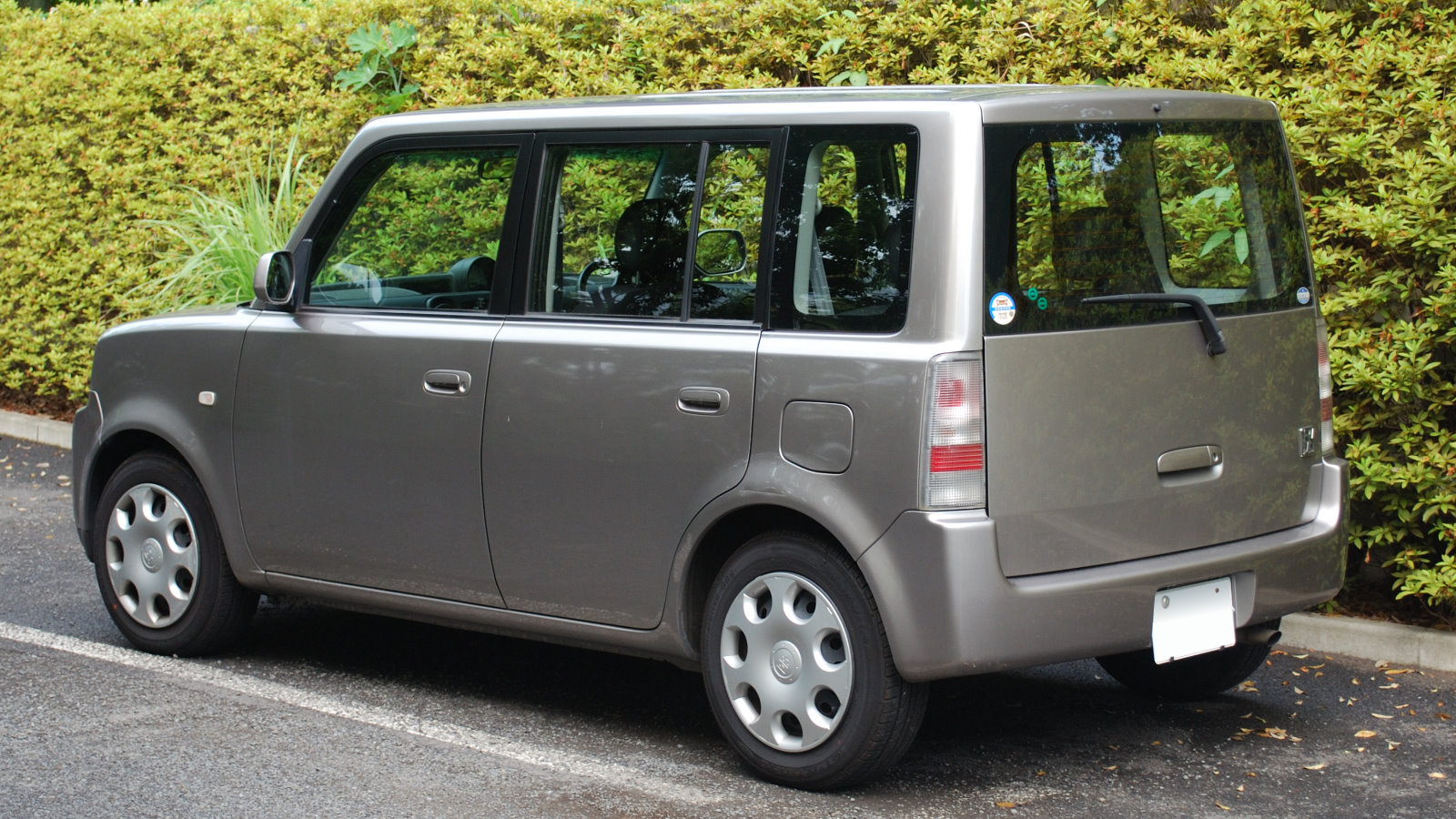
Japanese spec bB

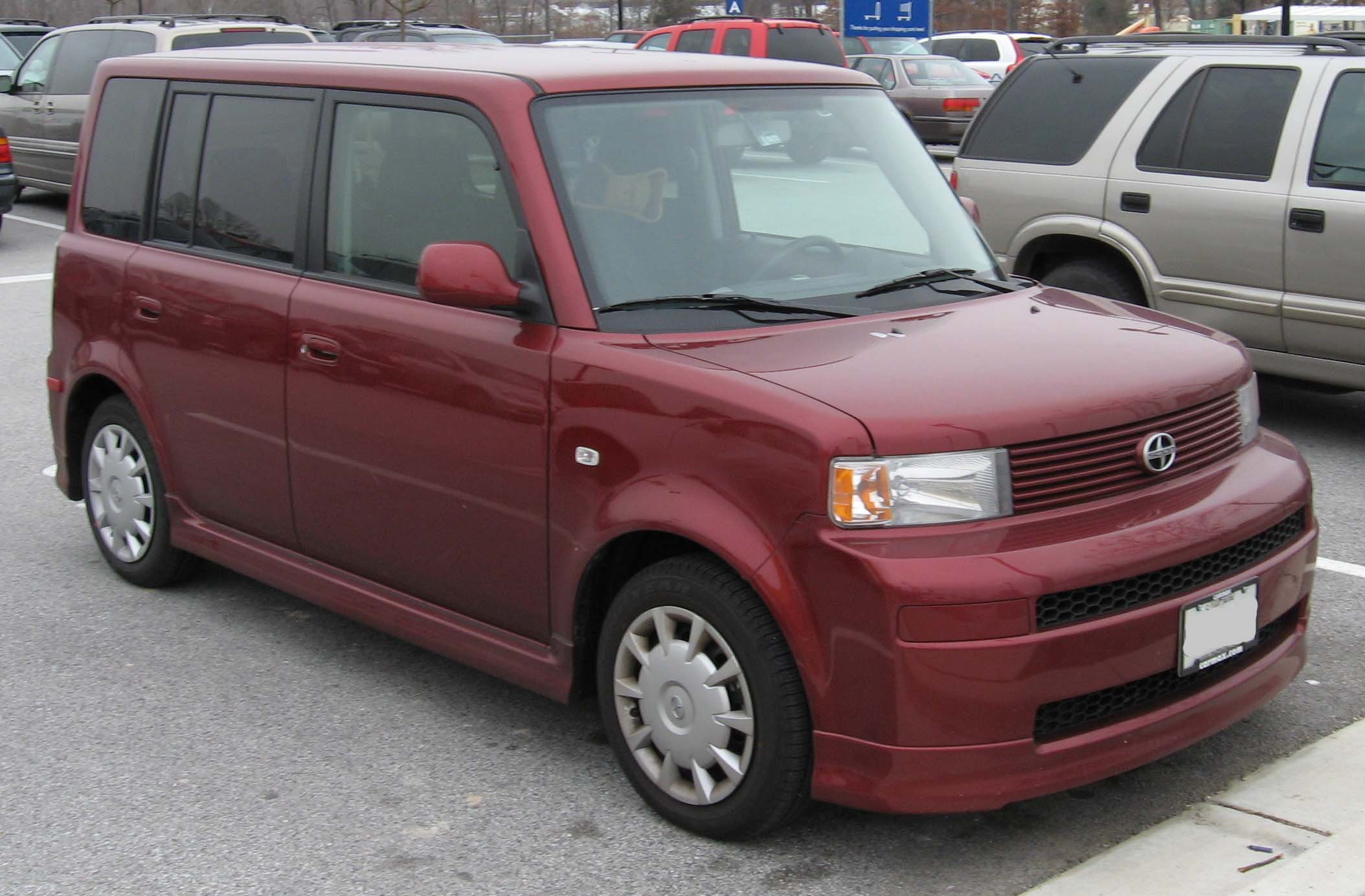
North American spec xB

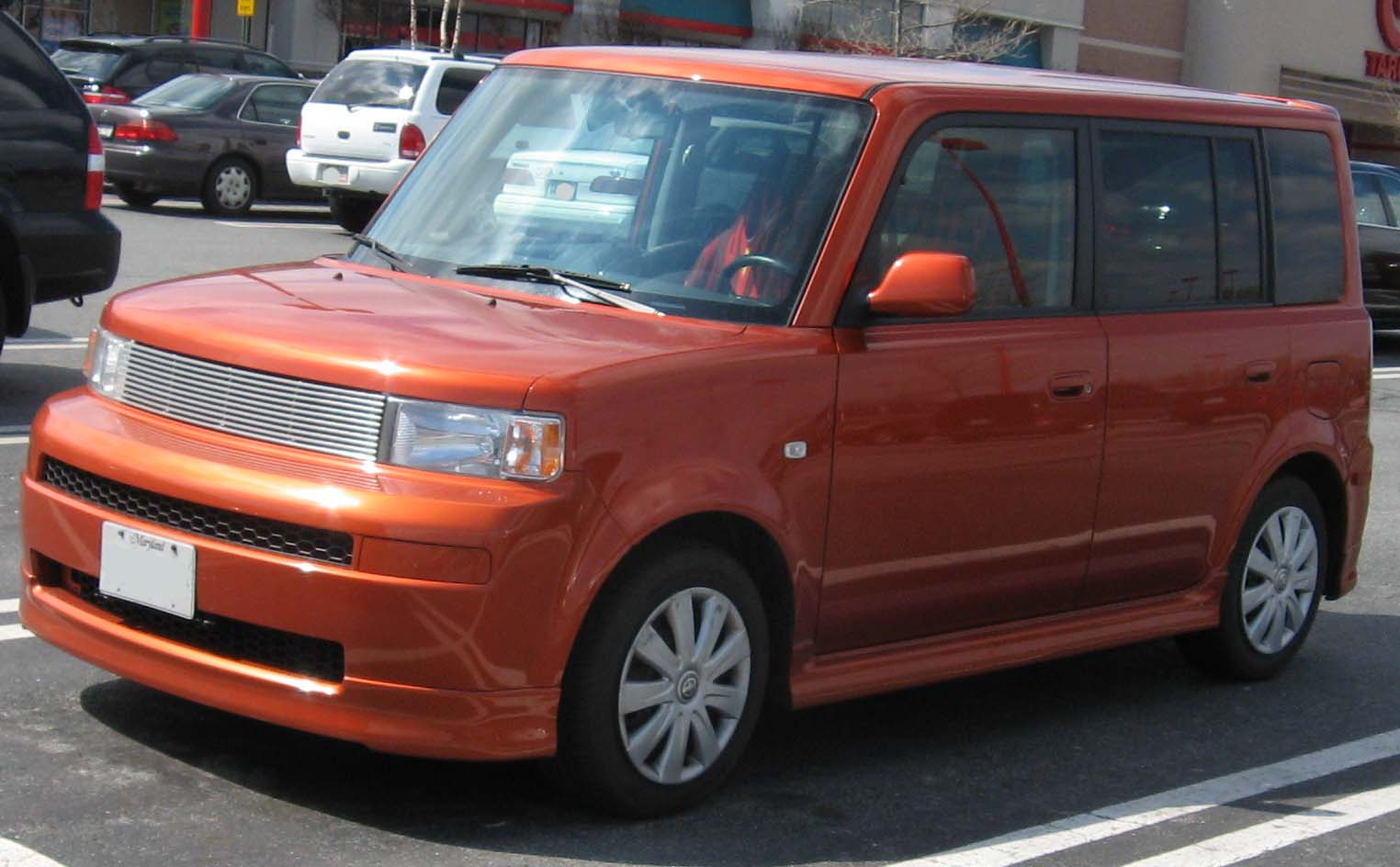
xB Release Series 1.0 variant

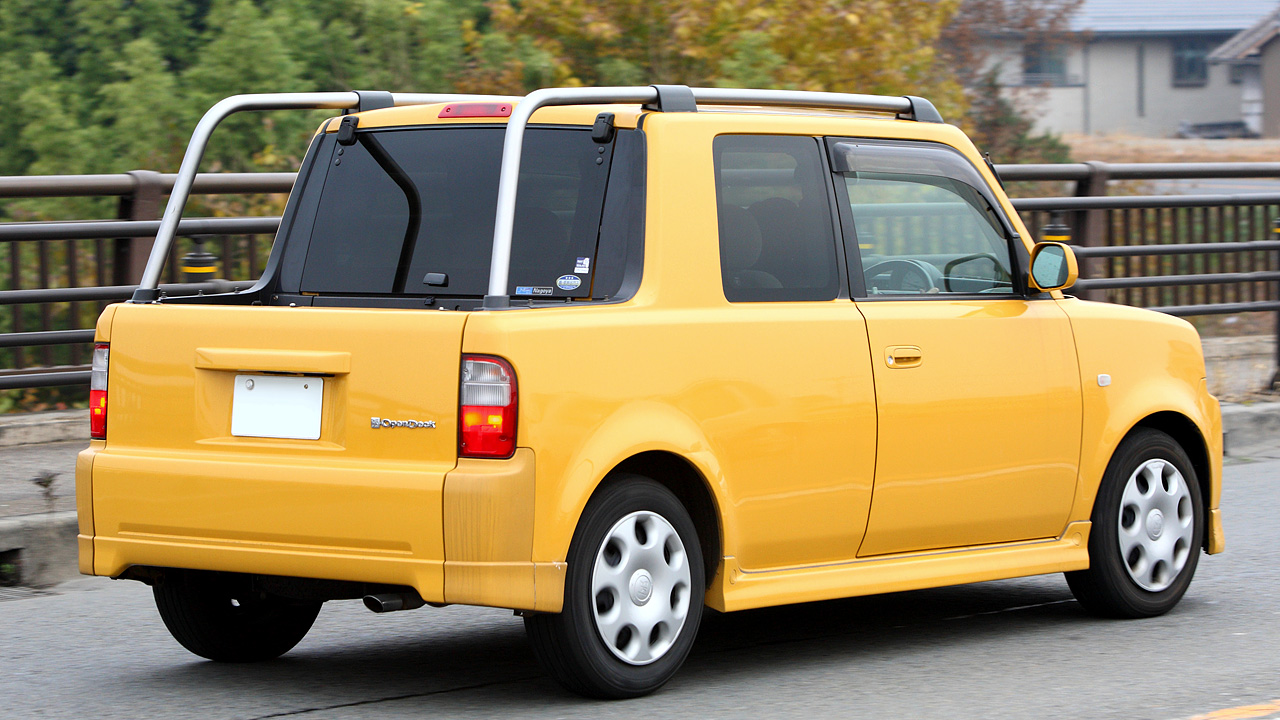
bB Open Deck

== Second generation (QNC20; 2005) ==
Second generation (QNC20)
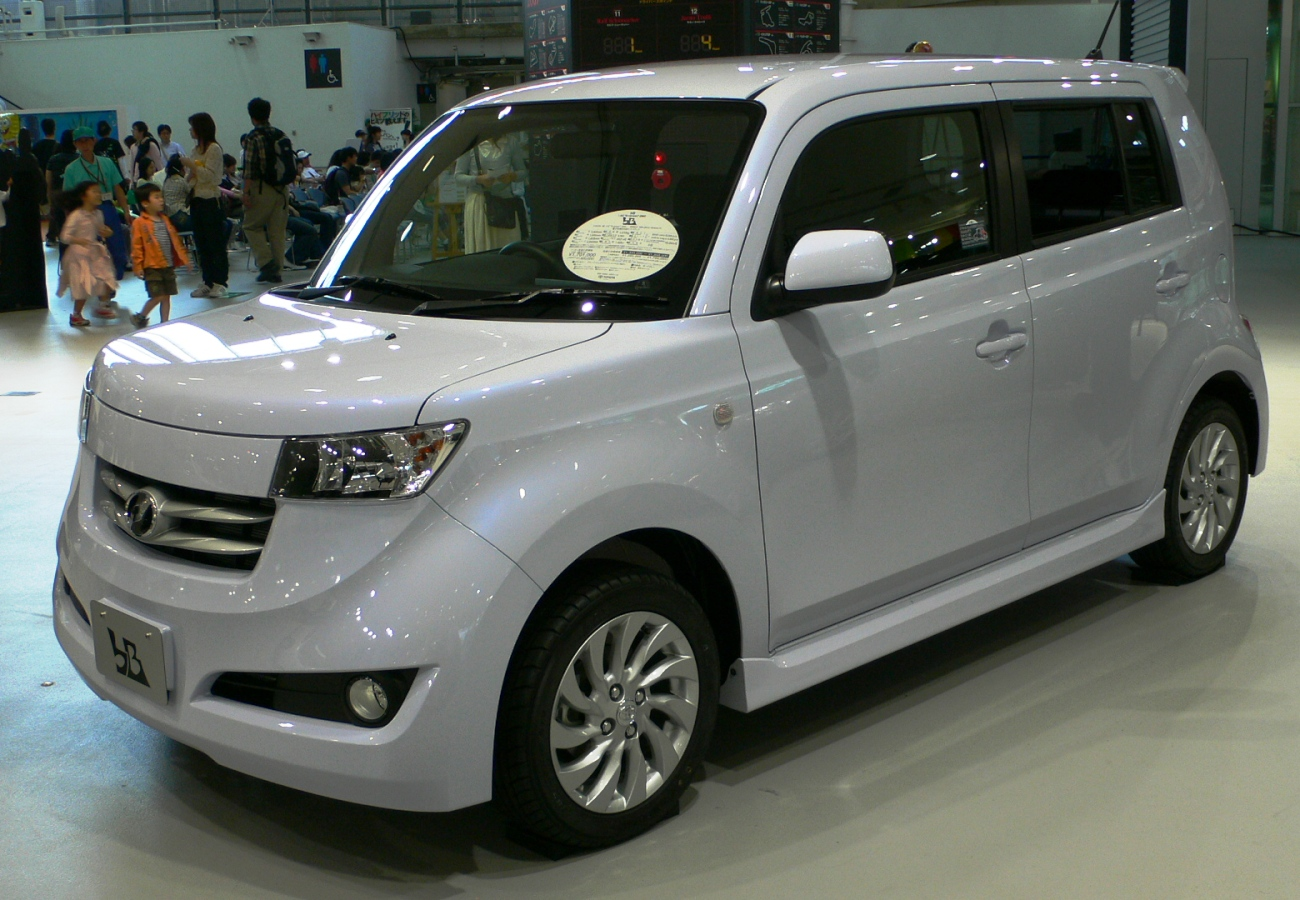

Overview
- Also called: Daihatsu Coo (in Japan and Taiwan); Daihatsu Materia; Subaru Dex
- Production: Toyota: December 2005 – May 2016; Daihatsu: May 2006 – January 2013 (Coo); July 2007 – 2015 (Materia); Subaru: November 2008 – November 2012
- Assembly: Japan: Ikeda, Osaka (Daihatsu Head Plant)
- Designer: Jiro Matsueda, Katsumi Kujime and Tastuya Takei (Coo/Materia); Mark Widjaja (2008 minor change)

Body and chassis
- Body style: 5-door hatchback
- Related: Daihatsu Boon; Daihatsu Sirion; Perodua Myvi

Powertrain
- Engine: 1.3 L K3-VE I4; 1.5 L 3SZ-VE I4; 1.5 L 3SZ-VET turbo I4 (South Africa)
- Transmission: 5-speed manual; 4-speed automatic

Dimensions
- Wheelbase: 2,540 mm (100.0 in)
- Length: 3,785–3,800 mm (149.0–149.6 in)
- Width: 1,690 mm (66.5 in)
- Height: 1,635 mm (64.4 in)
- Curb weight: 1,040–1,120 kg (2,293–2,469 lb)

The second generation bB was unveiled at the 2005 Tokyo Motor Show. Production version went on sale in Netz dealers. The second generation Scion xB is not based on the bB, but was specifically designed by Toyota to appeal to American buyers, which was sold in Japan as the Toyota Corolla Rumion.

In 2008, the S and Z grades received a minor facelift. Feature a redesigned front fascia design. An Aero Package was added, replaced the V and Q grades.

Badge engineered Daihatsu and Subaru models were also produced, but production ceased in 2012, leaving just the Toyota model. Production of the Toyota model also ceased in May 2016, with sales ending in Japan in July 2016, and it was replaced by the Toyota Tank and its twin counterpart the Toyota Roomy, which is a rebadged Daihatsu Thor.

=== Design ===
The vehicle was designed as "A Car-shaped Music Player" to hopefully satisfy the preferences of the younger generation. The Daihatsu version can be identified by a wider and shallower grille and indicator layout.

=== Body styles ===
Chassis codes	(DBA-)QNC21-BHSGK	(DBA-)QNC25-BHSGK	(DBA-)QNC20-BHSXK	(DBA-)QNC25-BHSXK
Model	Z 1.5 2WD	Z 1.3 4WD	S 1.3 2WD	S 1.3 4WD
Drive	FWD	4WD	FWD	4WD
Engine	3SZ-VE	K3-VE	K3-VE	K3-VE

=== Engines ===
Code	Type/code	Power, torque/rpm
3SZ-VE	1,495 cc (1.5 L; 91.2 cu in) (72.0 mm x 91.8 mm) I4	109 PS (80 kW; 108 hp) at 6000, 141 N⋅m (104 lb⋅ft) at 4400
"3SZ-VET" (South Africa)	1,495 cc (1.5 L; 91.2 cu in) (72.0 mm x 91.8 mm) I4	150 PS (110 kW; 148 hp) at 5750, 190 N⋅m (140 lb⋅ft) at 4800
K3-VE	1,297 cc (1.3 L; 79.1 cu in) (72.0 mm x 79.7 mm) I4	92 PS (68 kW; 91 hp) at 6000, 123 N⋅m (91 lb⋅ft) at 4400

=== Transmissions ===
All Toyota models include Super ECT 4-speed automatic transmission.

=== Daihatsu Coo/Materia ===
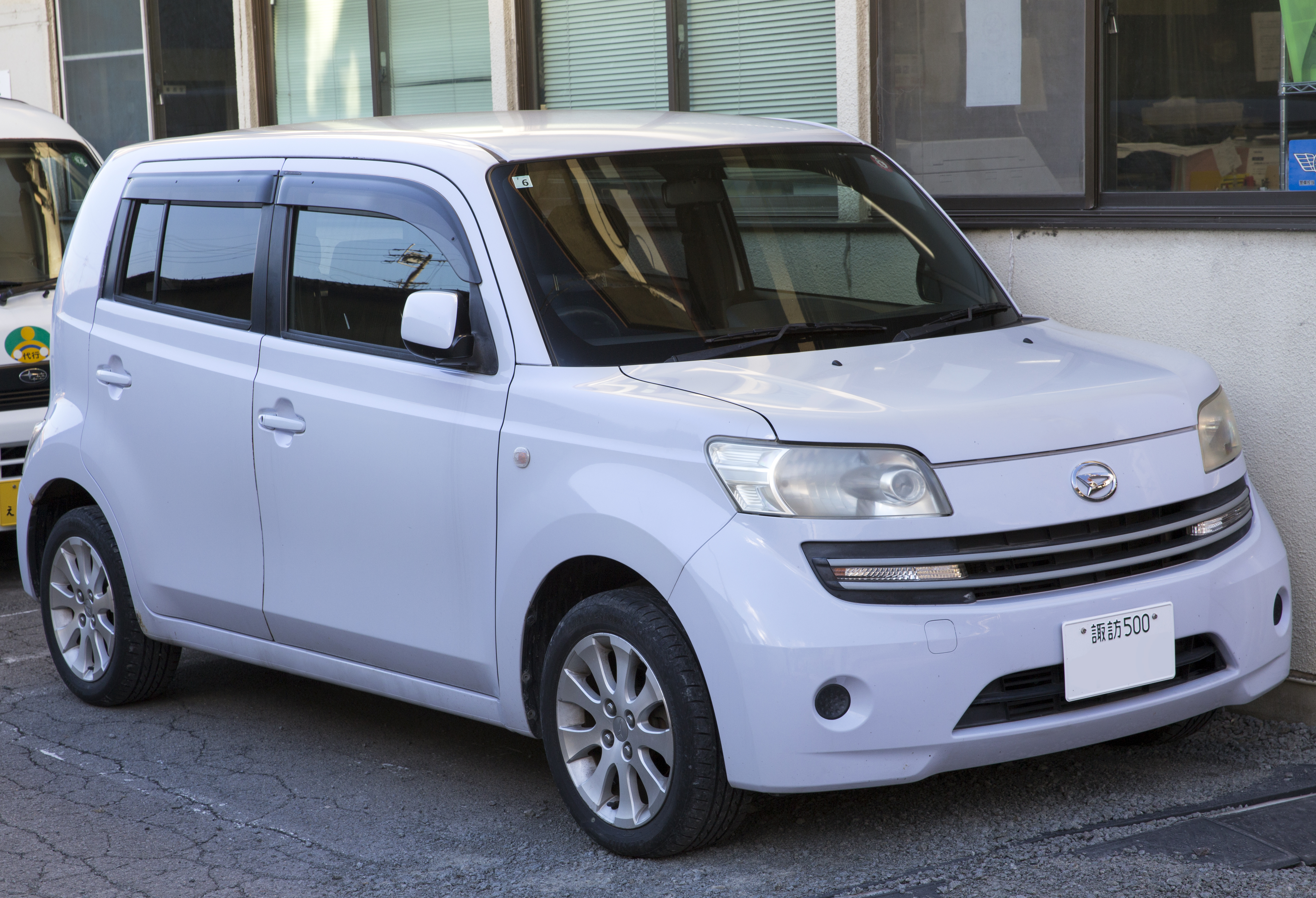
Daihatsu Coo (Japan)

The Daihatsu Materia (Daihatsu Coo in Japan) replaced the Daihatsu YRV and is largely identical to the second generation of the Toyota bB. It came in 1.3-litre and 1.5-litre varieties with a 4WD option that was available in Japan and several European markets. There were manual and automatic gearbox options. 0–97 km/h (0–60 mph) times are 10.8 seconds for the manual and 13.7 seconds for the auto. The maximum speed is 171 km/h (106 mph) for the manual and 164 km/h (102 mph) for the automatic. The vehicles were built in Head (Ikeda) Plant, Daihatsu Motor Co., Ltd.

In the tenth series of Top Gear, Jeremy Clarkson jokingly compared the Materia to the Ascari A10, saying, "Sure the Daihatsu Materia is a good car... but on balance... I'd choose the big, yellow, shouty car instead."

For the UK market, the Daihatsu Materia was only available with a 1.5-litre, 16 valve, fuel injected, petrol engine.

A limited edition Daihatsu Materia Turbo version was available only for the South African market. This version produces 110 kW (150 PS) at 5,750 rpm and 190 N⋅m (140 lb⋅ft) at 4,800 rpm, with a top speed electronically limited to 200 km/h (124 mph). A rear roof spoiler, bonnet scoop, alloy wheels, and a set of lowering springs from Eibach rounded out the package. The initial, October 2009 batch was of only 40 cars.

Sales of the Daihatsu Coo ended in Japan in January 2013.

=== Subaru Dex ===
The Subaru Dex is a badge engineered version for Subaru with the K3-VE 1.3-litre engine and a choice of FWD or 4WD.

=== Gallery ===
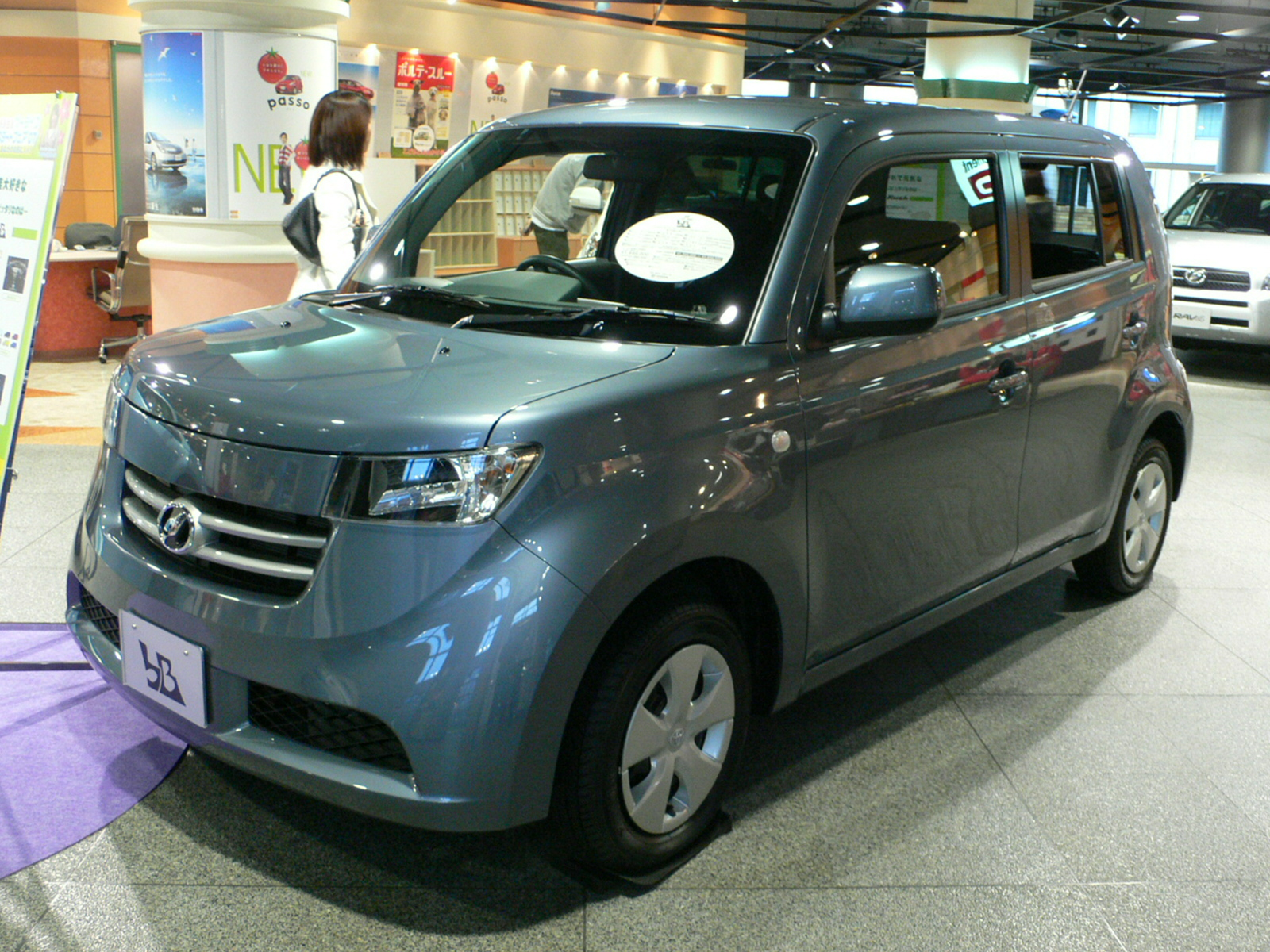
2005–2008 Toyota bB S/Z

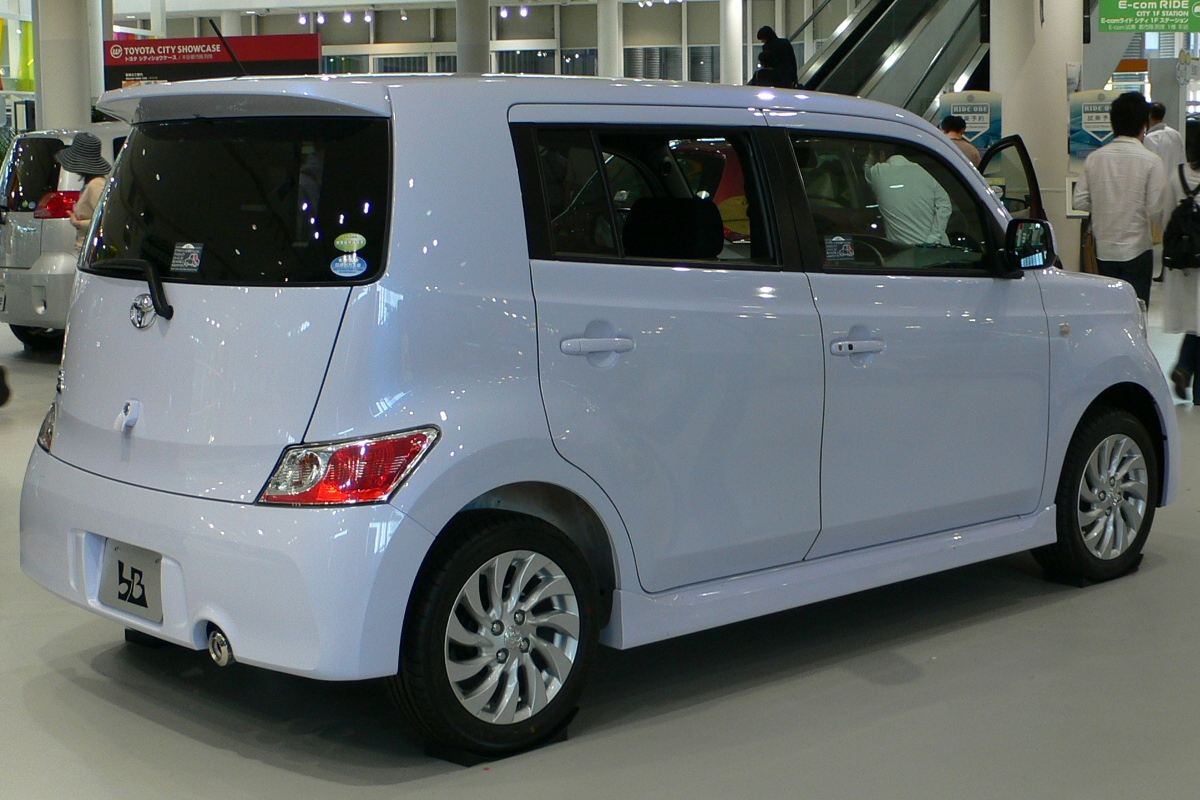
2005 Toyota bB (Japan)

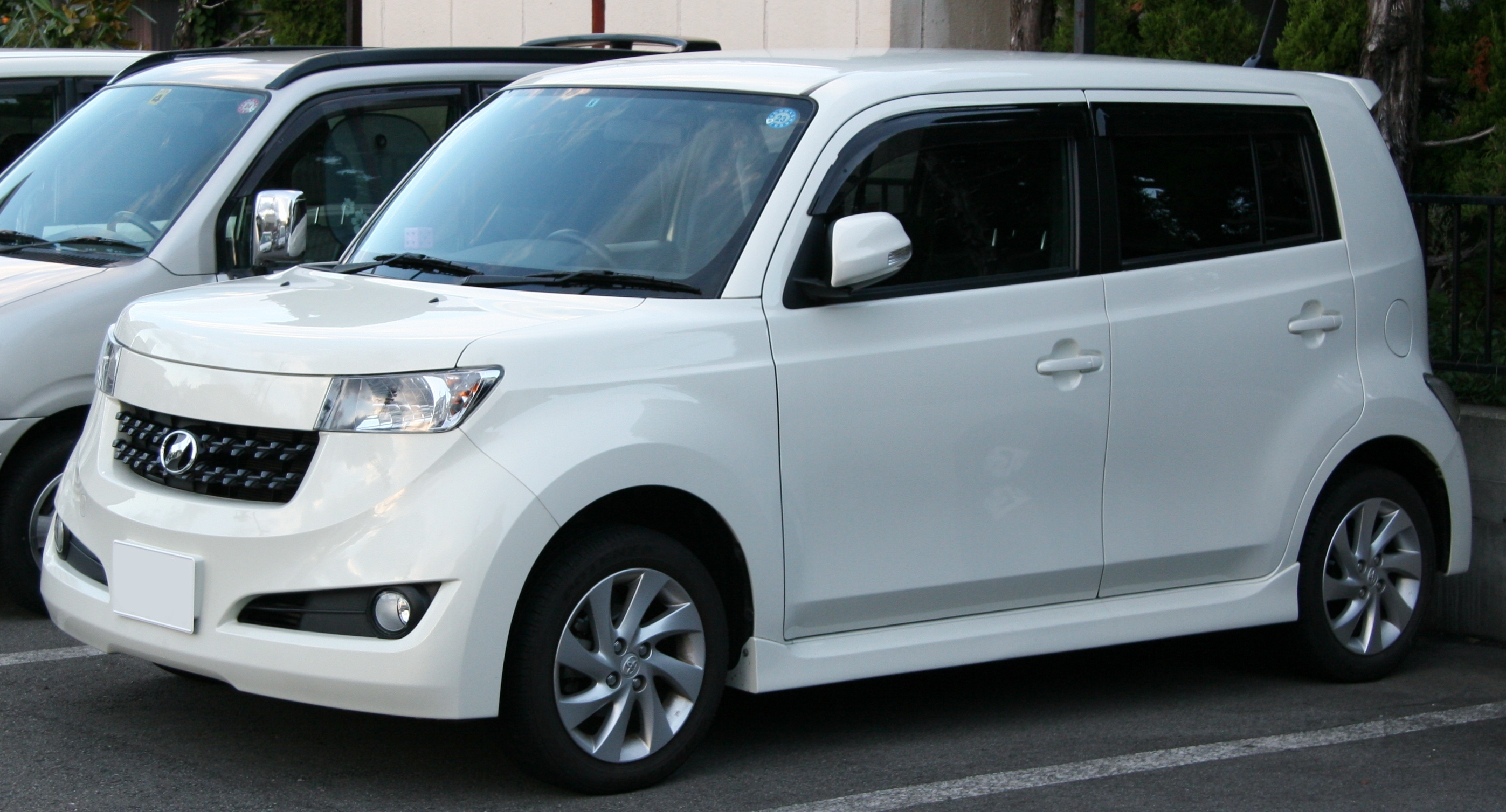
2008 Toyota bB Aero Package (Japan)

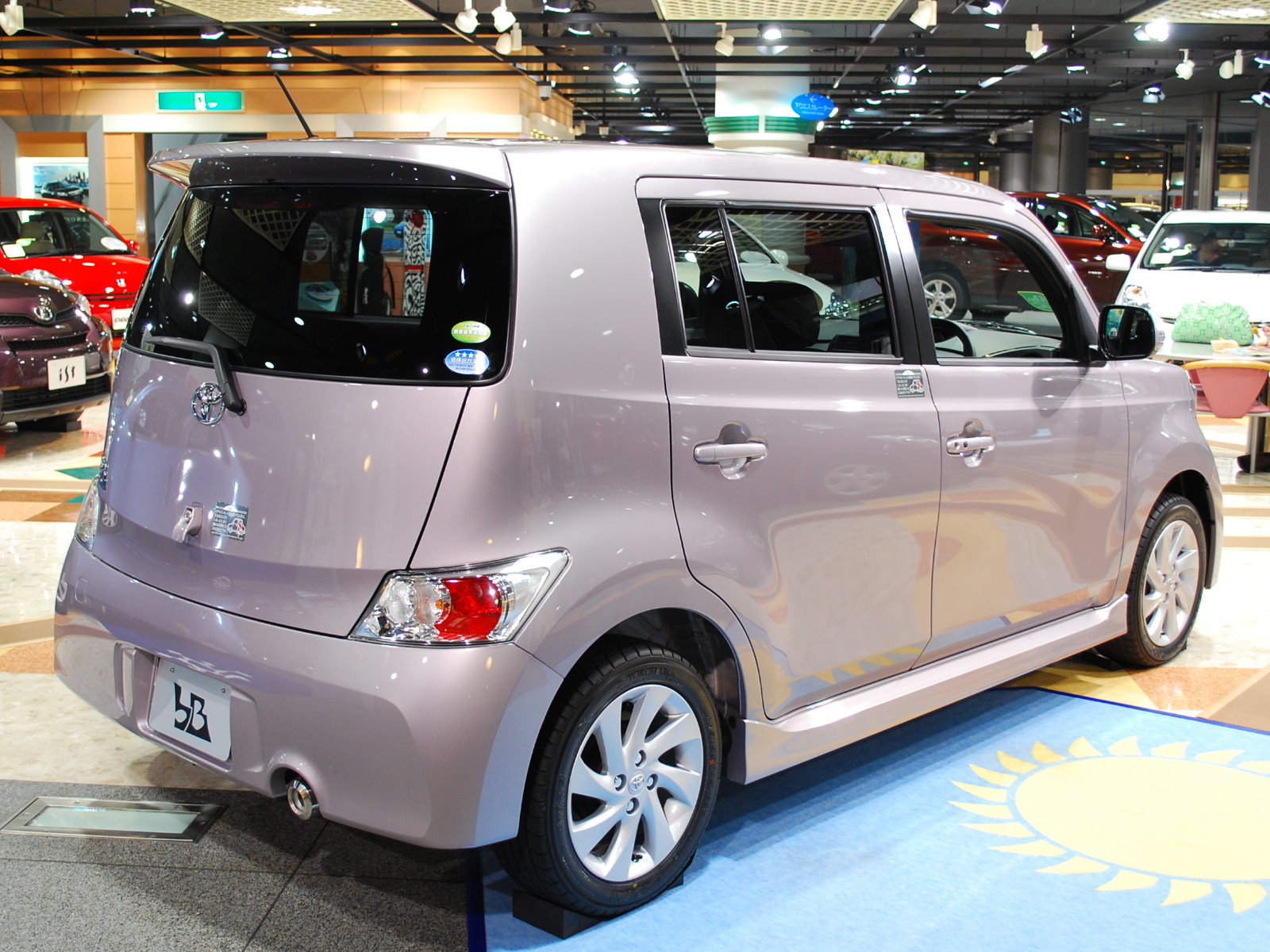
2008 Toyota bB (Japan)

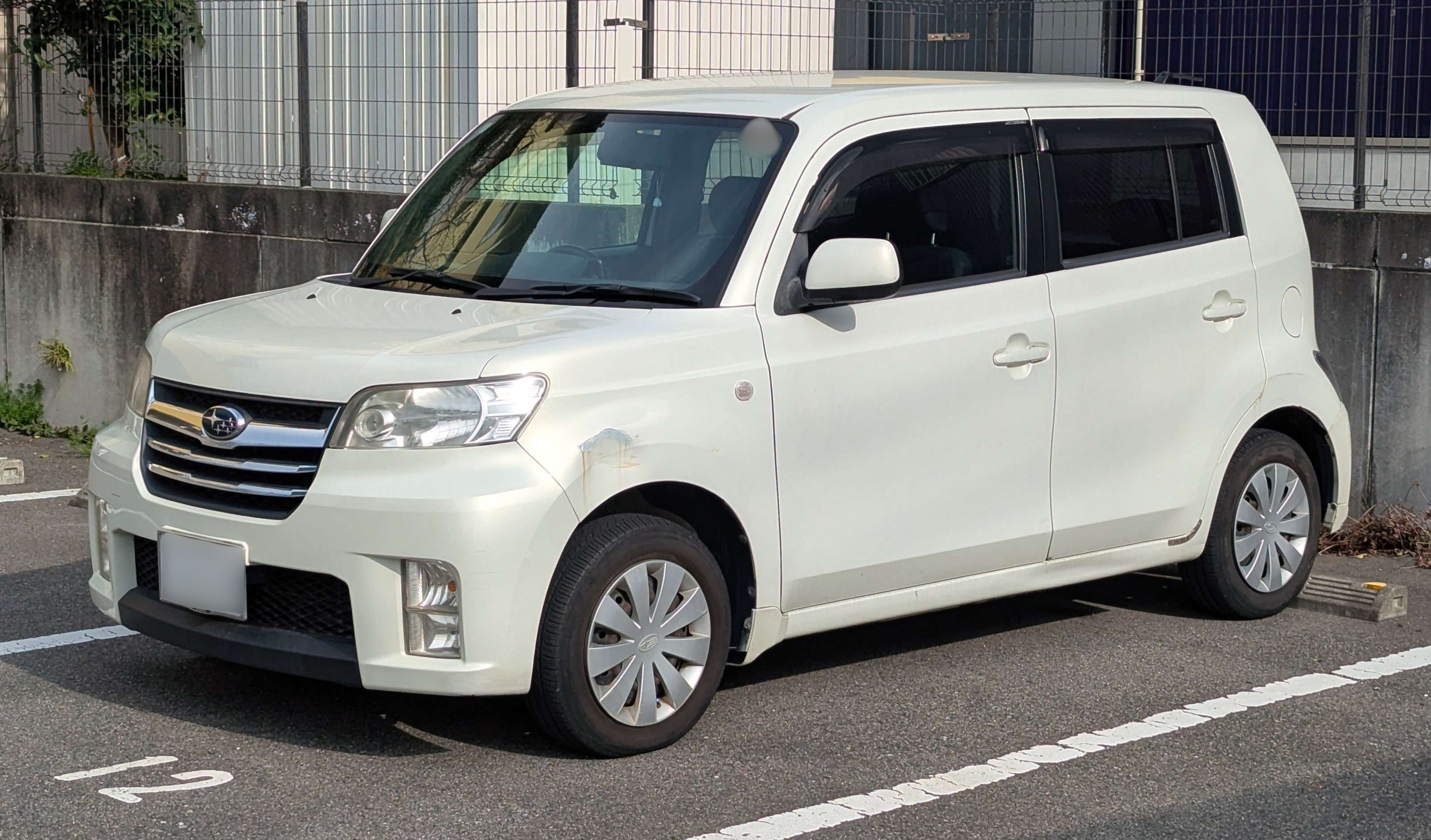
2008 Subaru Dex (Japan)

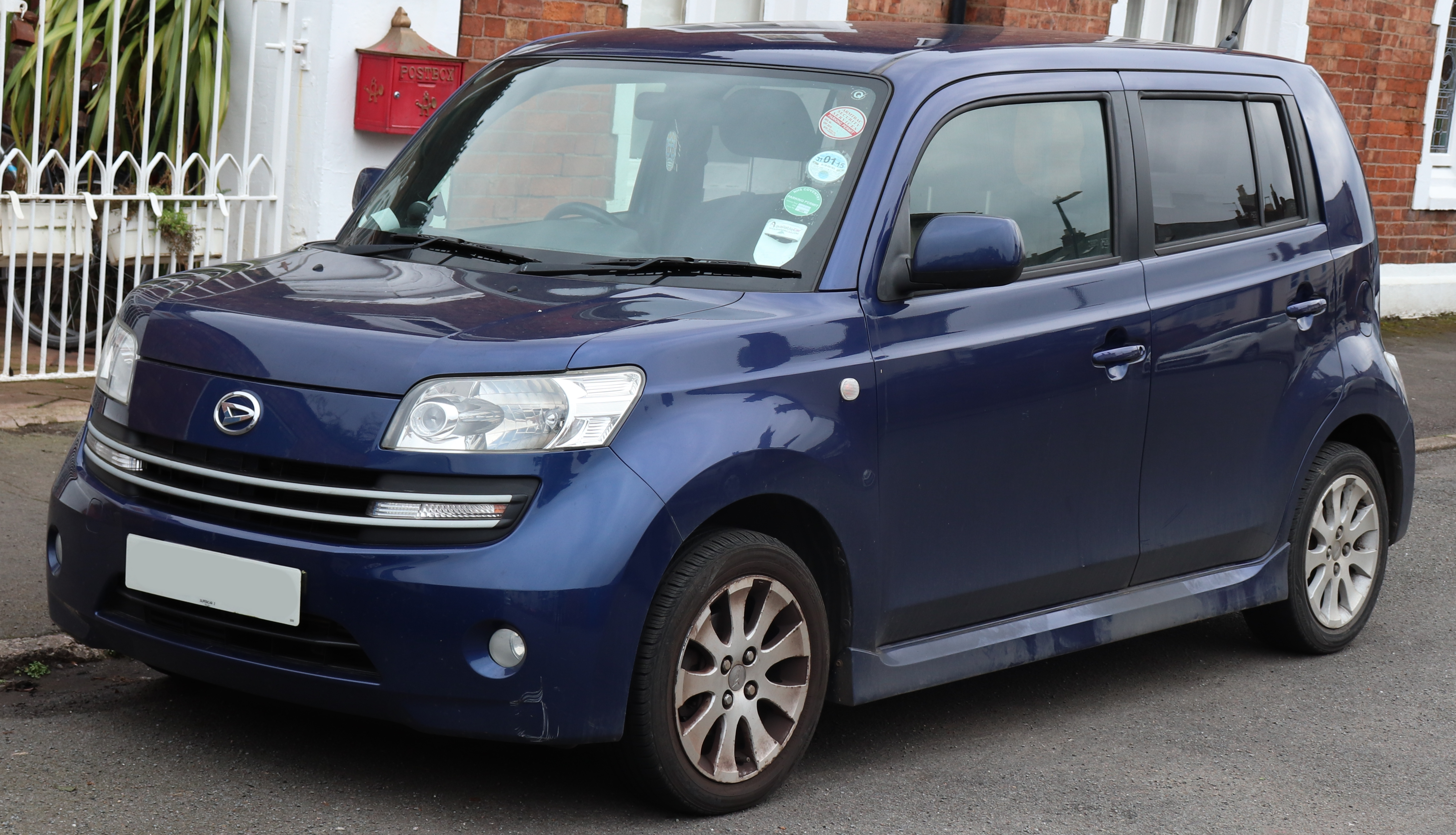
Daihatsu Materia

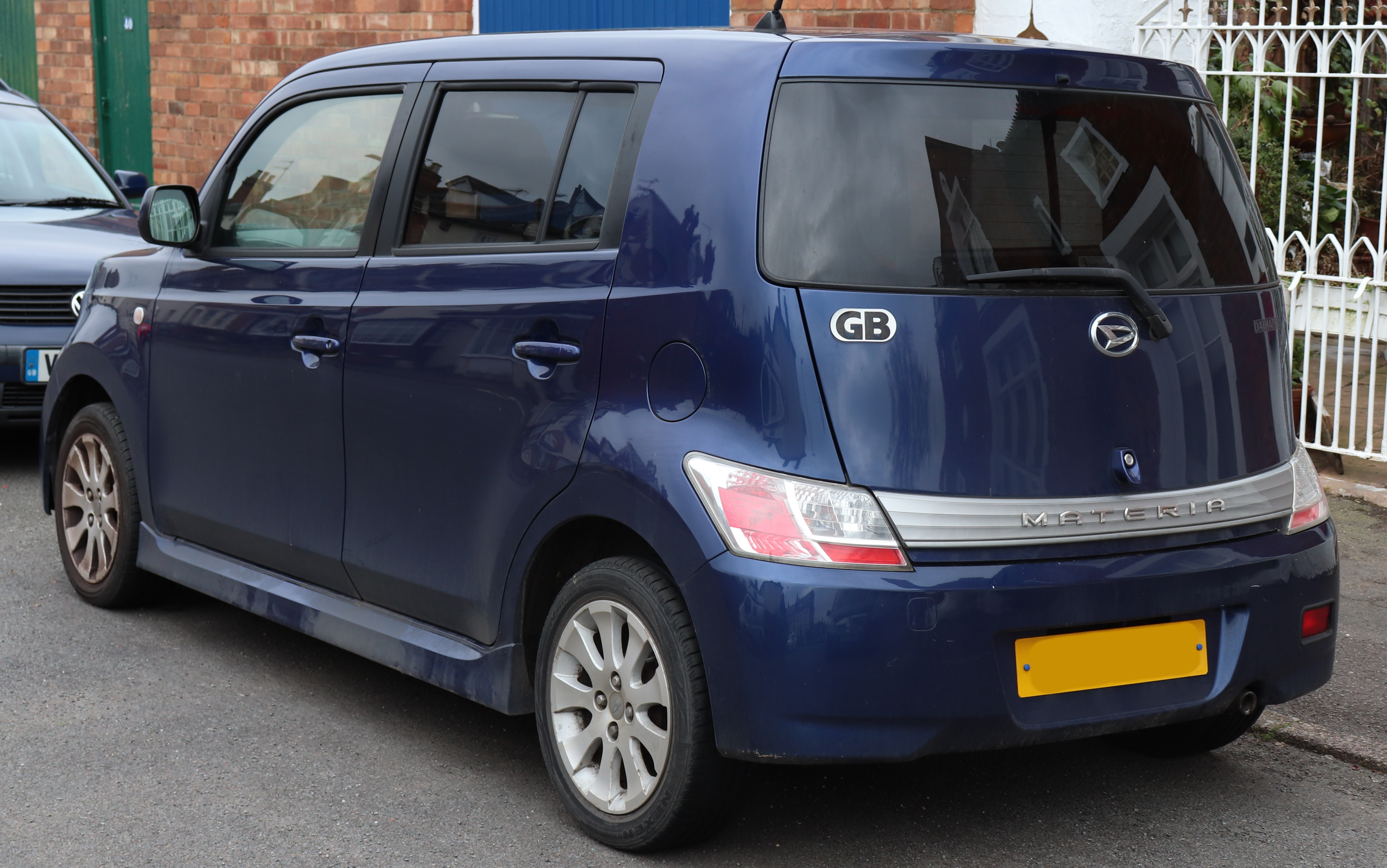
Daihatsu Materia

== See also ==
- List of Toyota vehicles
