= Scion ccX =

Japanese compact hatchback concept

Overview
- Production: 2003

Body and chassis
- Body style: 3-door hatchback

The Scion ccX is a concept car unveiled by the automaker Scion at the Detroit Auto Show on January 7, 2003. The car is unusual in design, with the roof comprising two panoramic sunroofs that slide in opposite directions connected to form a single platform, not unlike the Scion tC's single panoramic sunroof. The interior is made of futuristic-looking materials, such as blue sport seats and a sleek dash.

The car was designed in Japan and built in Italy. It never entered production.

== Sources ==
- Scion
- Scion ccX page on Scion Life
