= Toyota Ist =

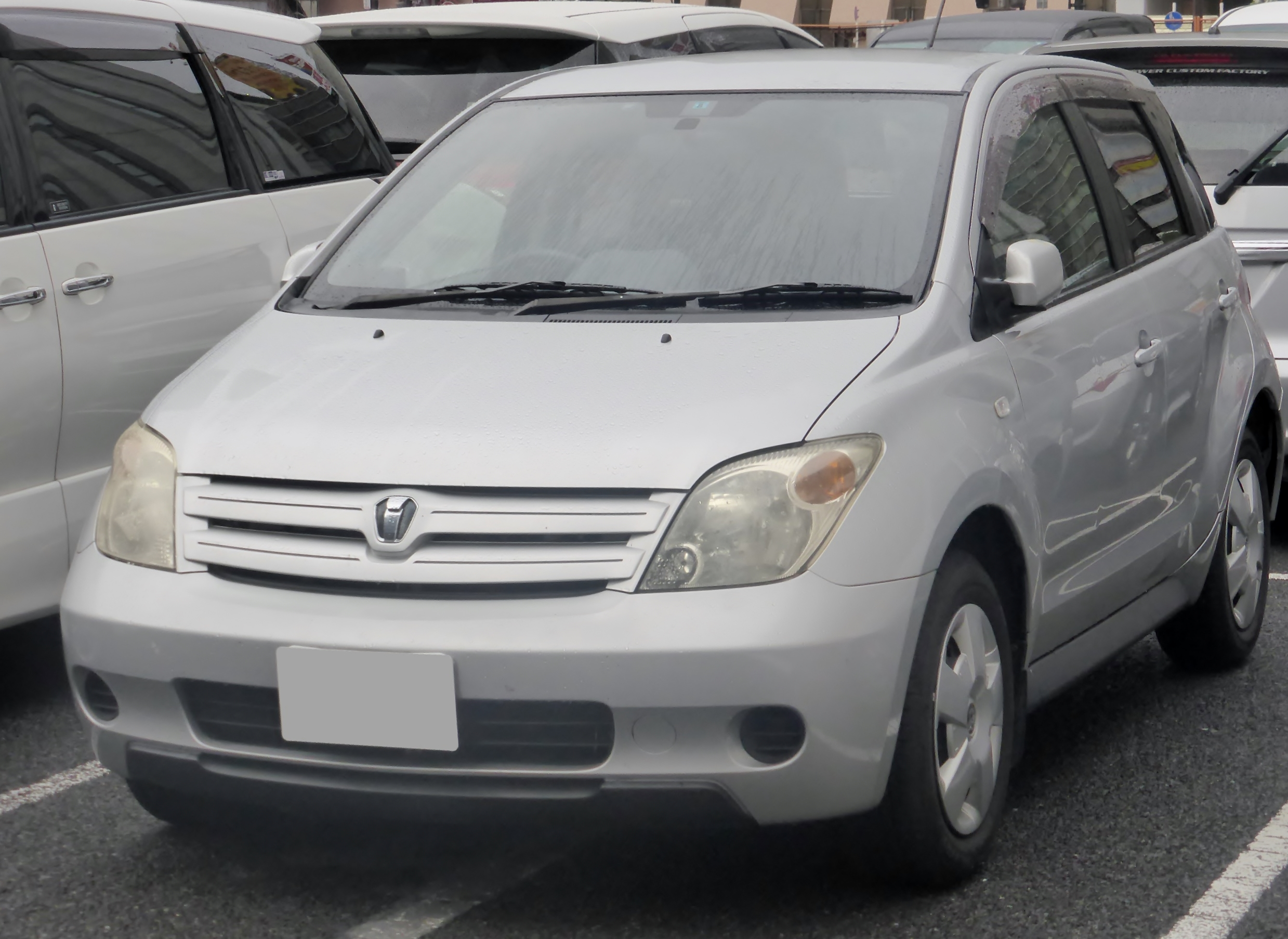
- 2002–2005 Toyota Ist 1.3 F (NCP60, Japan)

Overview
- Manufacturer: Toyota
- Also called: Scion xA (North America, 2004–2006); Scion xD (North America, 2007–2014); Toyota Urban Cruiser (Europe and Latin America, 2008–2014)
- Production: May 2002 – March 2016

Body and chassis
- Class: Subcompact car
- Body style: 5-door hatchback
- Layout: Front-engine, front-wheel-drive; Front-engine, four-wheel-drive

Chronology
- Successor: Toyota Yaris Cross

The Toyota Ist (Japanese: トヨタ・ist (イスト), Toyota Isuto) (stylised as ist) is a subcompact car manufactured by the Japanese automaker Toyota. It is exported to the United States as the Scion xA and Scion xD, the Middle East as the Toyota xA and to Europe and Latin America as the Toyota Urban Cruiser for the second generation.

The Ist, the sixth brand to use the Vitz as the base model, was conceived as a high-end multi-use compact car with SUV-like styling and wagon-like roominess. The car was fitted with either a 1.3-liter (FWD) or a 1.5-liter engine (FWD or 4WD), with a Super ECT transmission. A wide front grille consisting of two thick horizontal bars, large 15-inch tires, and extended wheel arches gave the vehicle its unique and dynamic exterior styling. The body dimensions were a notch above those of the Vitz, giving more space to the cabin and the trunk. The 6:4 split rear seats could be fully folded to widen the deck as necessary. The sturdy body structure was realized through the advanced GOA (Global Outstanding Assessment) process, which enhanced safety in collisions with heavier vehicles.

In Japan, it was available at Toyota dealerships Netz Store (first and second generation models) and Toyopet Store (pre-facelift first generation model only).

The car's name is derived from the suffix "-ist," the name points to a person who is passionate about something (stylist, artist, specialist, and so on).

== First generation (XP60; 2002) ==
First generation (XP60)
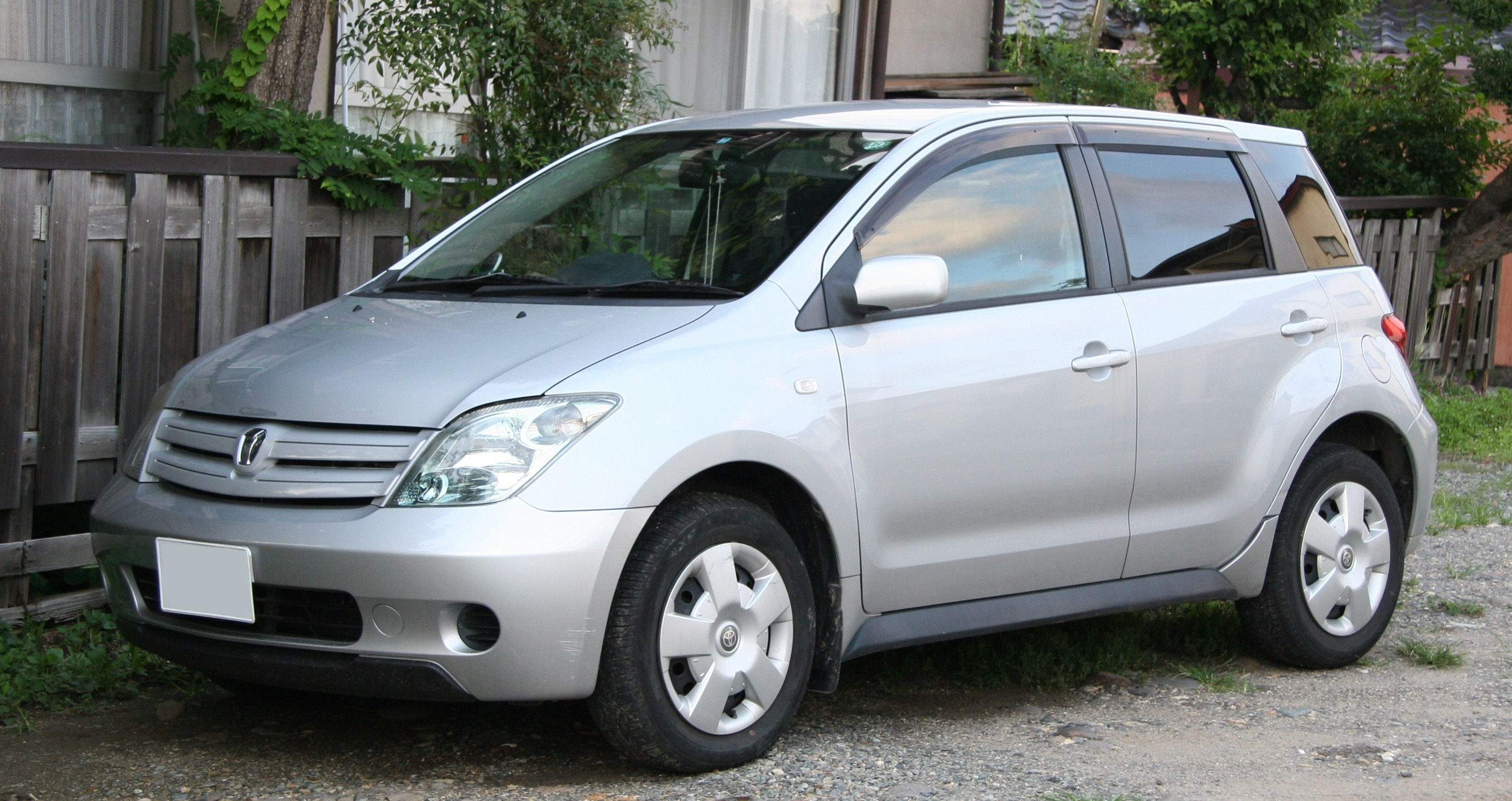
- 2002–2005 Toyota Ist (Japan)

Overview
- Also called: Scion xA (North America); Toyota xA (Middle East)
- Production: May 2002 – July 2007
- Assembly: Japan: Kanegasaki, Iwate (Kanto Auto Works)
- Designer: Masanari Sakae (2000)

Body and chassis
- Platform: Toyota NBC platform
- Related: Toyota Vitz/Yaris/Echo hatchback (XP10); Toyota Platz/Yaris/Echo sedan/coupé (XP10); Toyota Yaris Verso/FunCargo; Toyota bB/Scion xB (XP30)

Powertrain
- Engine: 1.3 L 2NZ-FE I4 (petrol); 1.5 L 1NZ-FE I4 (petrol)
- Power output: 64 kW (86 hp; 87 PS) (2NZ-FE); 77–80 kW (103–107 hp; 105–109 PS) (1NZ-FE)
- Transmission: 5-speed manual; 4-speed automatic

Dimensions
- Wheelbase: 2,370 mm (93.3 in)
- Length: 3,855 mm (151.8 in)
- Width: 1,695 mm (66.7 in)
- Height: 1,530–1,535 mm (60.2–60.4 in)
- Kerb weight: 1,000–1,100 kg (2,205–2,425 lb)

Based on the first generation Toyota Vitz hatchback, the first generation Ist also shared a platform with the Platz sedan.

The model codes are NCP60 (1300, 2NZ, FWD), NCP61 (1500, 1NZ, FWD), NCP65 (1500, 1NZ, 4WD).

The Ist was developed from the Vitz supermini in a crossover SUV bodystyle offering the flexibility of larger SUVs, but with the advantage of better fuel economy from a smaller vehicle. It first appeared at the 2001 Tokyo Motor Show, and went on sale on 8 May 2002 at Netz Store (all prefectures), Toyopet Store (excluding Osaka prefecture) and Toyota Store (Osaka prefecture only). It received its facelift on 30 May 2005 and was only available at Netz Store.

The Ist is meant to cater to younger drivers, being sold as a Scion in North America and as the xA in the Middle East. The Ist interior is unique with an easy to read central instrumental cluster position similar to the Vitz, Platz and Vios. At its introduction, 42,000 orders were received in Japan.

Its primary competitor is the Honda Fit and the Nissan March. The first-generation car was used by the Shizuoka Prefectural Police as a police car.

The ist was offered in a variant tuned by TRD, with the same turbocharged 1NZ-FE Turbo as the Vitz RS Turbo/TRD Turbo M/GRMN Turbo or the Corolla Axio/Fielder GT TRD Turbo. Unlike those, the ist TRD Turbo was a dealer installed option and not a separate trim level, just like with the bB TRD Turbo. The car also had other enhancements, such as TRD suspension, muffler, air filter, front brake pads and emblems.

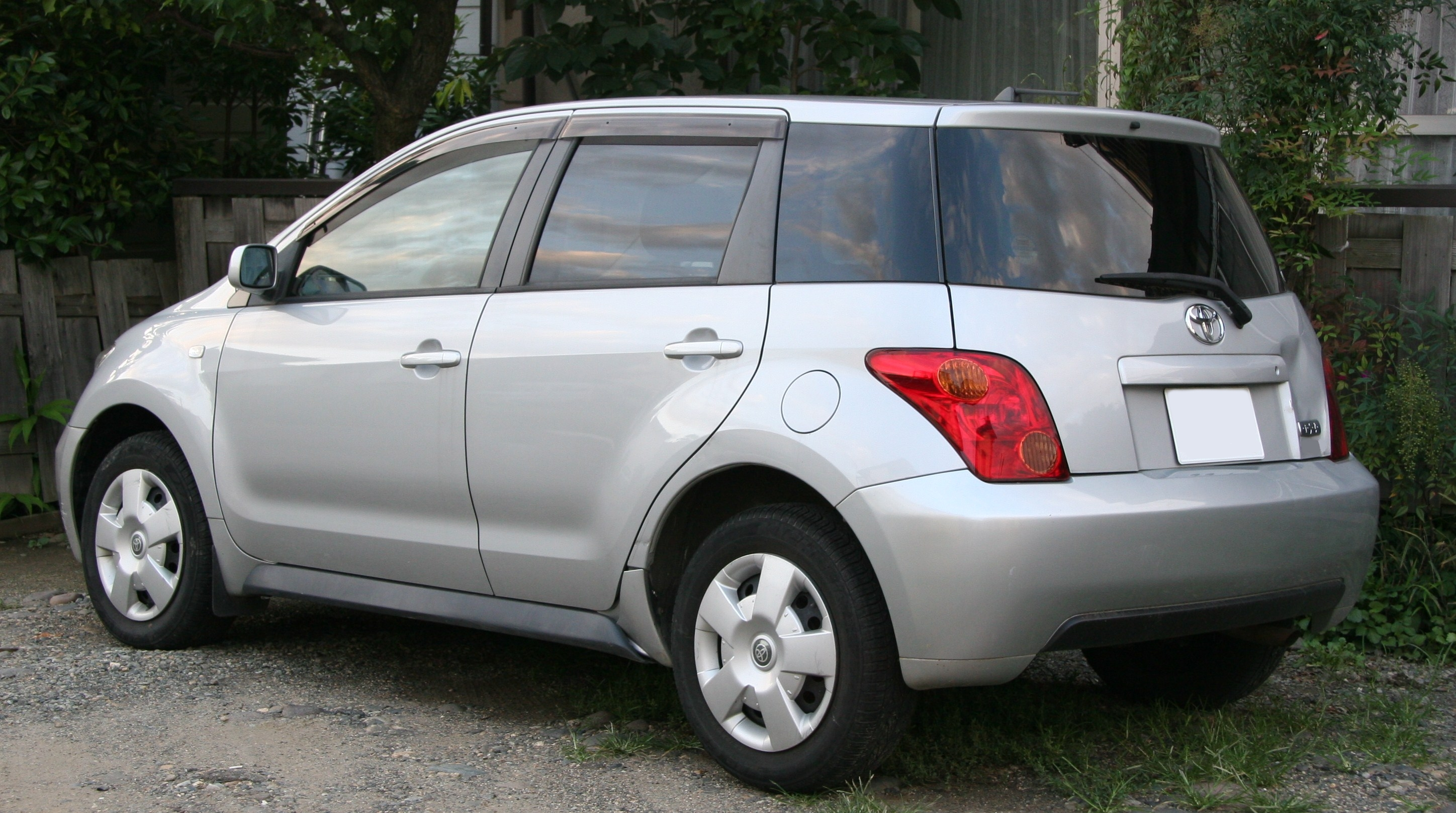
2002–2005 Toyota Ist (Japan)

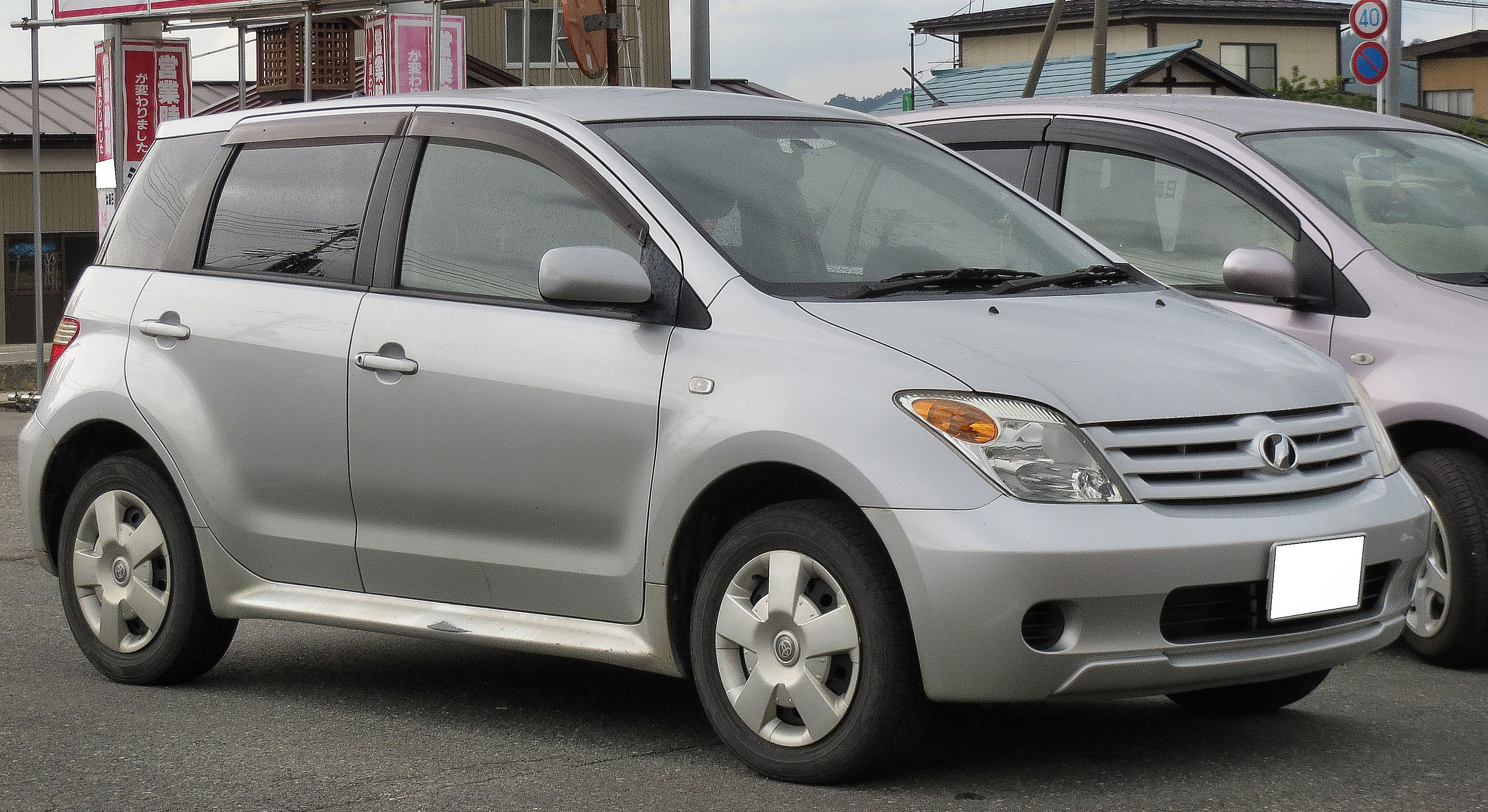
2005–2007 Toyota Ist (Japan)

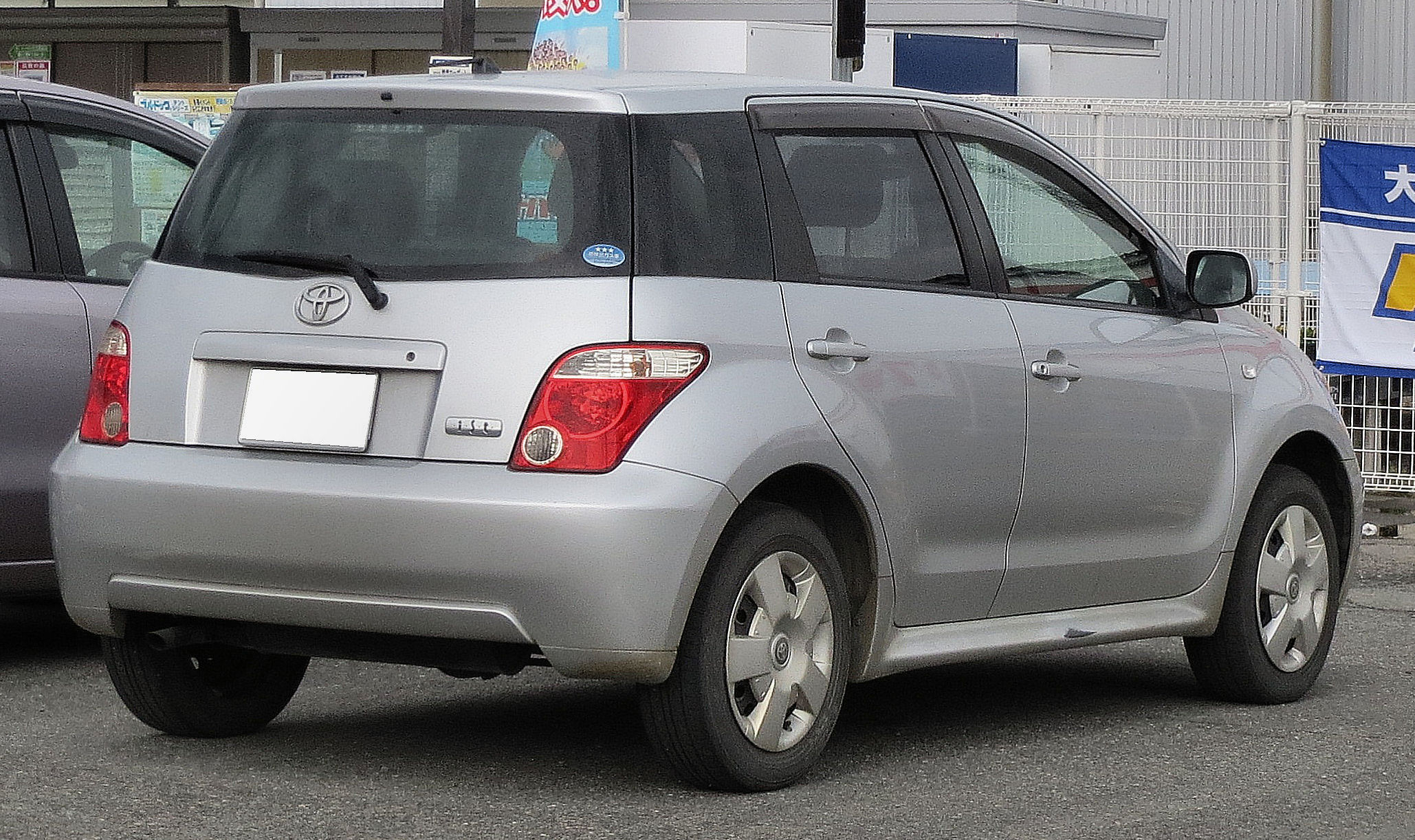
2005–2007 Toyota Ist (Japan)

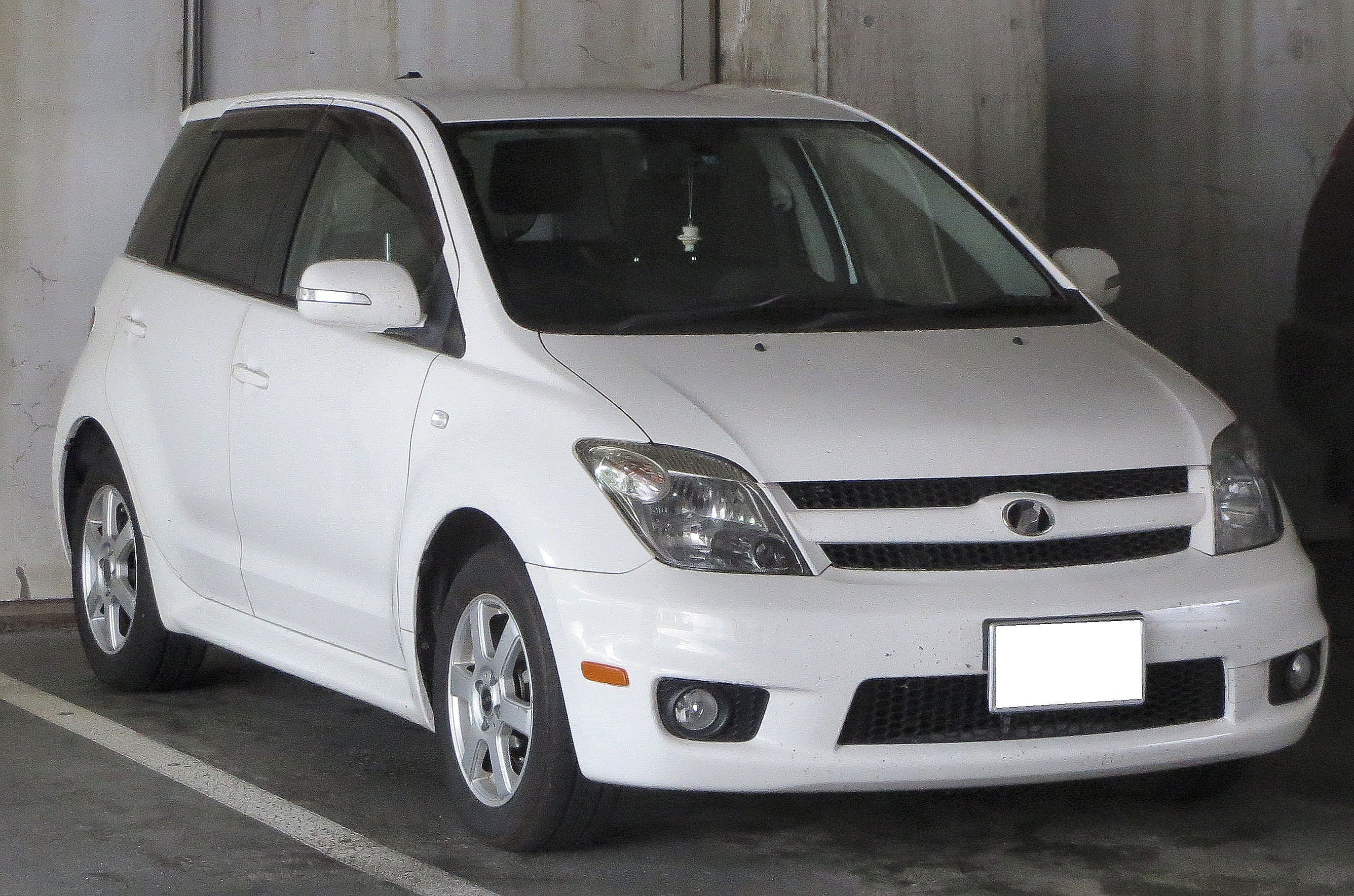
2005–2007 Toyota Ist A-S (Japan)

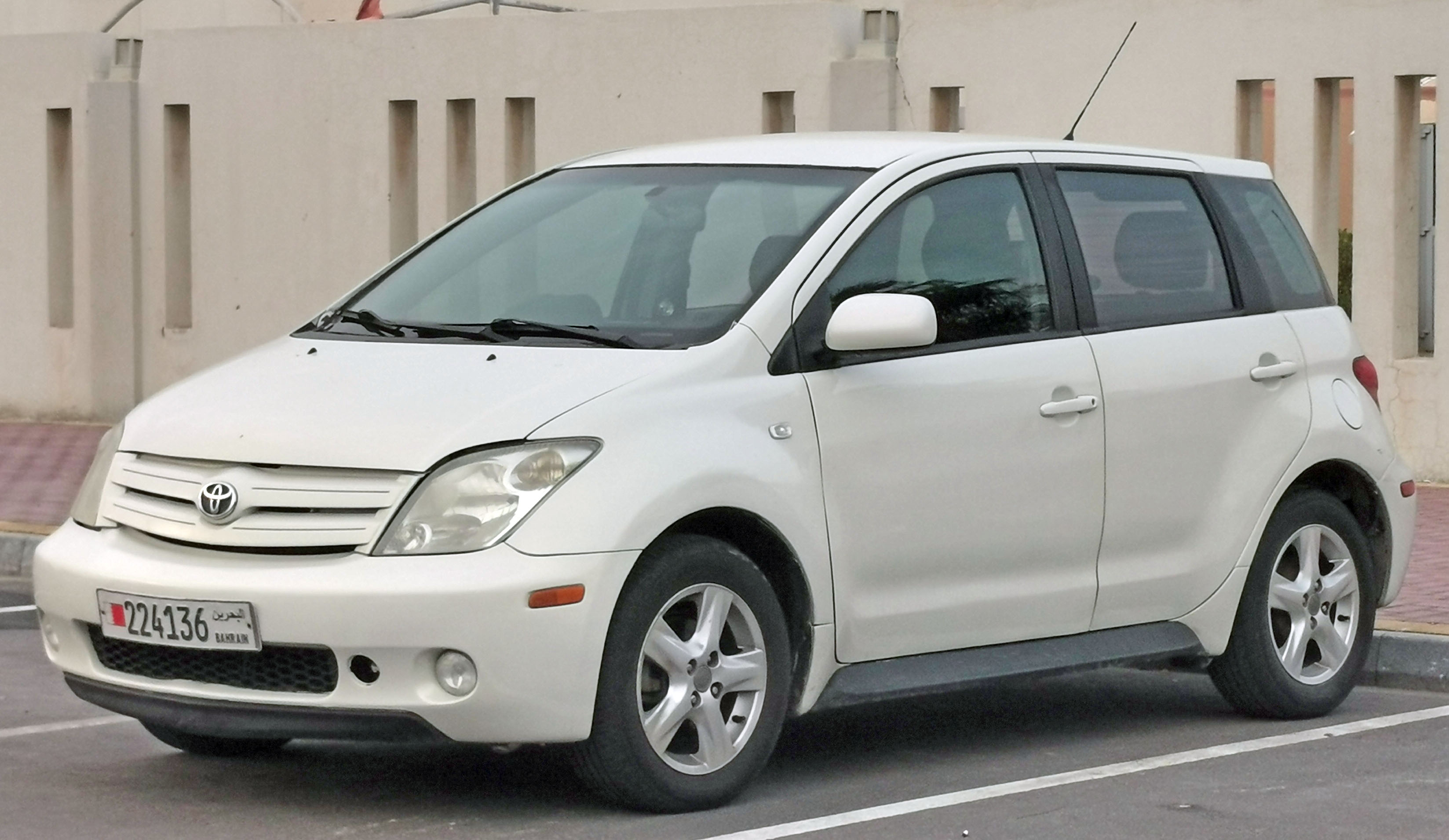
Toyota xA (Bahrain)

== Second generation (XP110; 2007) ==
Second generation (XP110)
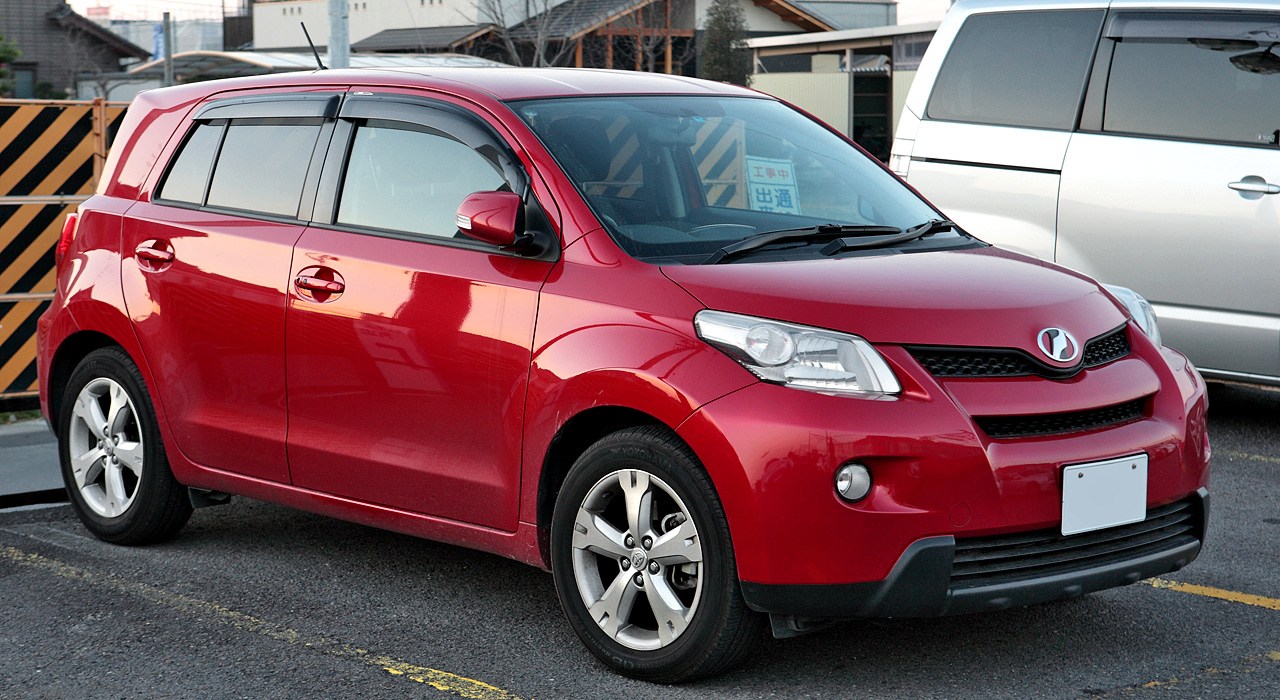
- 2007 Toyota Ist (Japan)

Overview
- Also called: Scion xD (North America); Toyota Urban Cruiser (Europe and Latin America)
- Production: July 2007 – March 2016; 2008 – 2014 (Urban Cruiser)
- Assembly: Japan: Kanegasaki, Iwate (Kanto Auto Works, 2007–2012); Ōhira, Miyagi (Toyota Motor East Japan, 2012–2016)
- Designer: Junho Kim and Masaaki Yagi (2005)

Body and chassis
- Platform: Toyota B platform
- Related: Toyota Vitz/Yaris hatchback (XP90); Toyota Belta/Yaris sedan/Vios (XP90); Toyota Ractis (XP100)

Powertrain
- Engine: 1.3 L 1NR-FE I4 (petrol, Europe); 1.5 L 1NZ-FE I4 (petrol, Japan); 1.8 L 2ZR-FE I4 (petrol, Japan); 1.4 L 1ND-TV I4-T (diesel, Europe)
- Power output: 73 kW (98 hp; 99 PS) (1NR-FE); 76–80 kW (102–107 hp; 103–109 PS) (1NZ-FE); 97 kW (130 hp; 132 PS) (2ZR-FE); 66 kW (89 hp; 90 PS) (1ND-TV)
- Transmission: 6-speed manual (Europe); 4-speed automatic (Japan); CVT

Dimensions
- Wheelbase: 2,460 mm (96.9 in)
- Length: 3,930 mm (154.7 in)
- Width: 1,725 mm (67.9 in)
- Height: 1,525–1,540 mm (60.0–60.6 in)
- Kerb weight: 1,150–1,210 kg (2,535–2,668 lb)

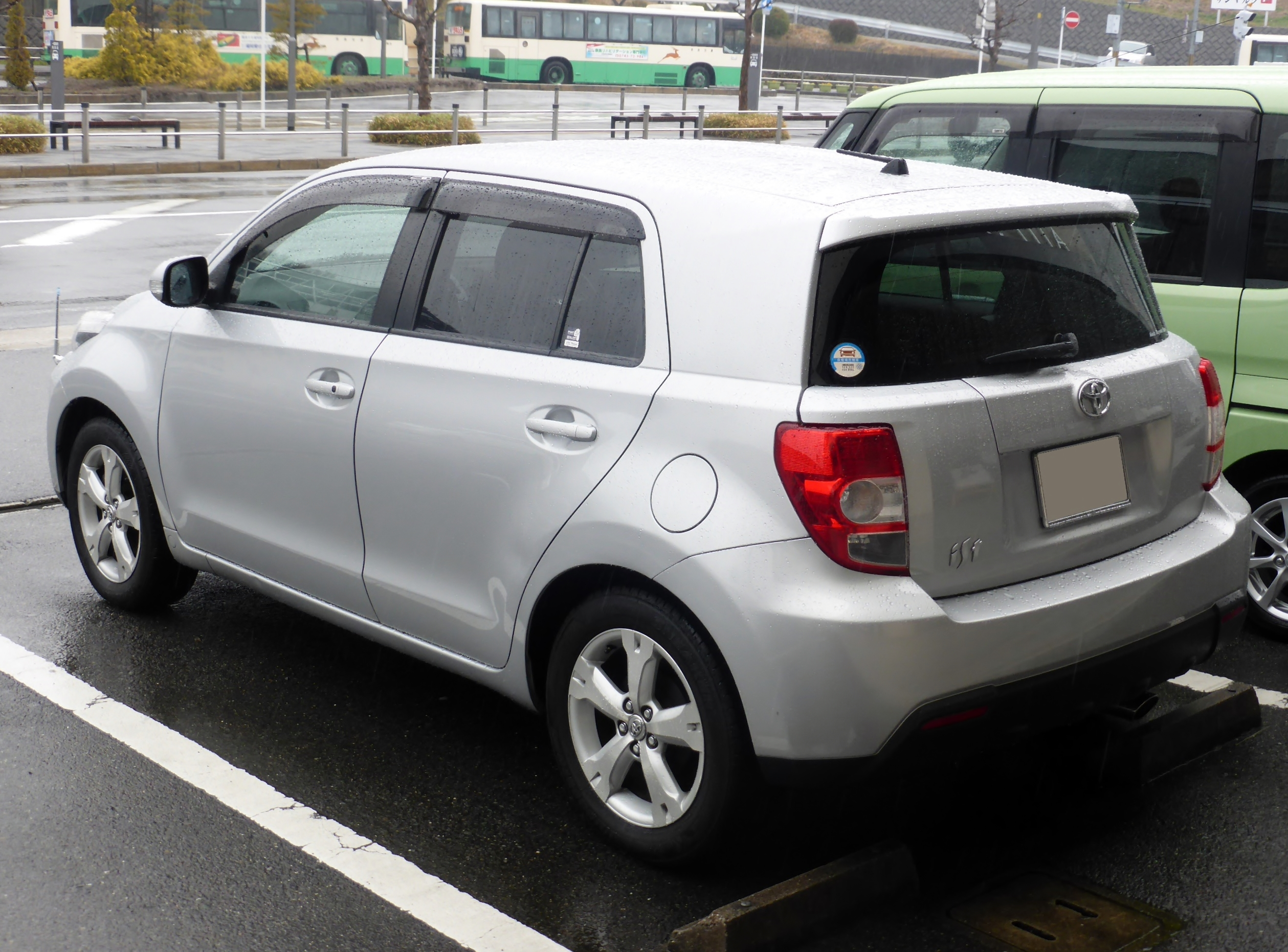
Rear view

The second generation Ist is similar to the five-door Toyota Yaris/Vitz, with its instrument gauges centered in front of the driver as opposed to the center of the dashboard. The design of the vehicle is inspired by the 2006 Toyota Urban Cruiser Concept, designed by Toyota ED².

This new Ist, like its predecessor, is marketed as a Scion in the US, superseding the first generation Ist, which was marketed as the xA.

In Europe and Latin America, it is marketed as the Urban Cruiser with a revised fascia.

In Japan, the second generation Ist went on sale on 30 July 2007, marketed via the Netz Store in two trim levels namely 150G and 150X and equipped with Super CVT-i for the 1NZ-FE option. AWD was available in the JDM as well as a center console. The 180G with the 2ZR-FE engine option was also offered until August 2010.

Starting in 2007 in Japan, G-BOOK, a subscription telematics service, is offered as an option.

The former Kanto Auto Works manufactured the Ist from January 2010.

Manufacture of the Ist ended in March 2016, with JDM sales ending on 29 April 2016. It was replaced by the Yaris Cross in 2020.

=== Urban Cruiser ===
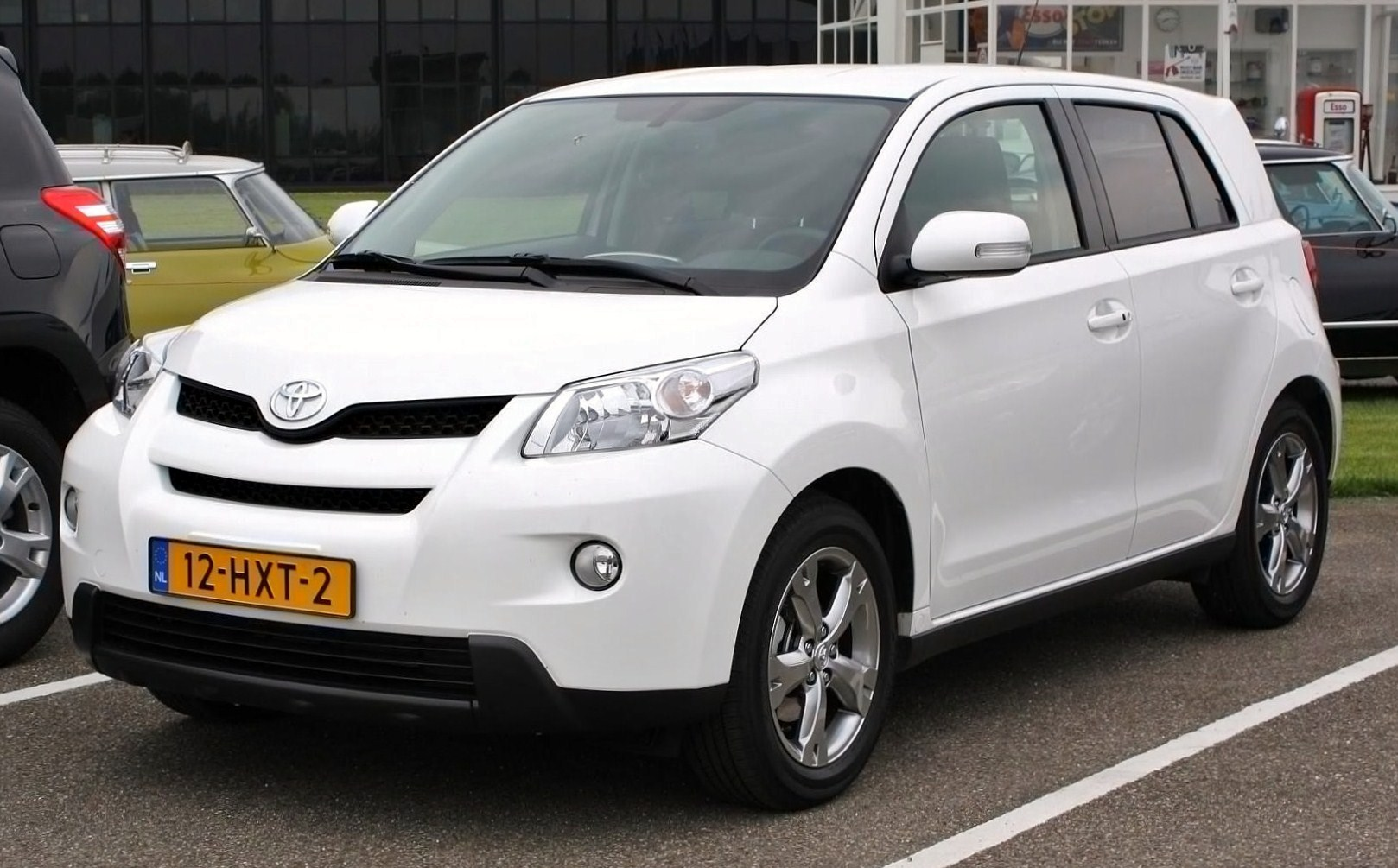

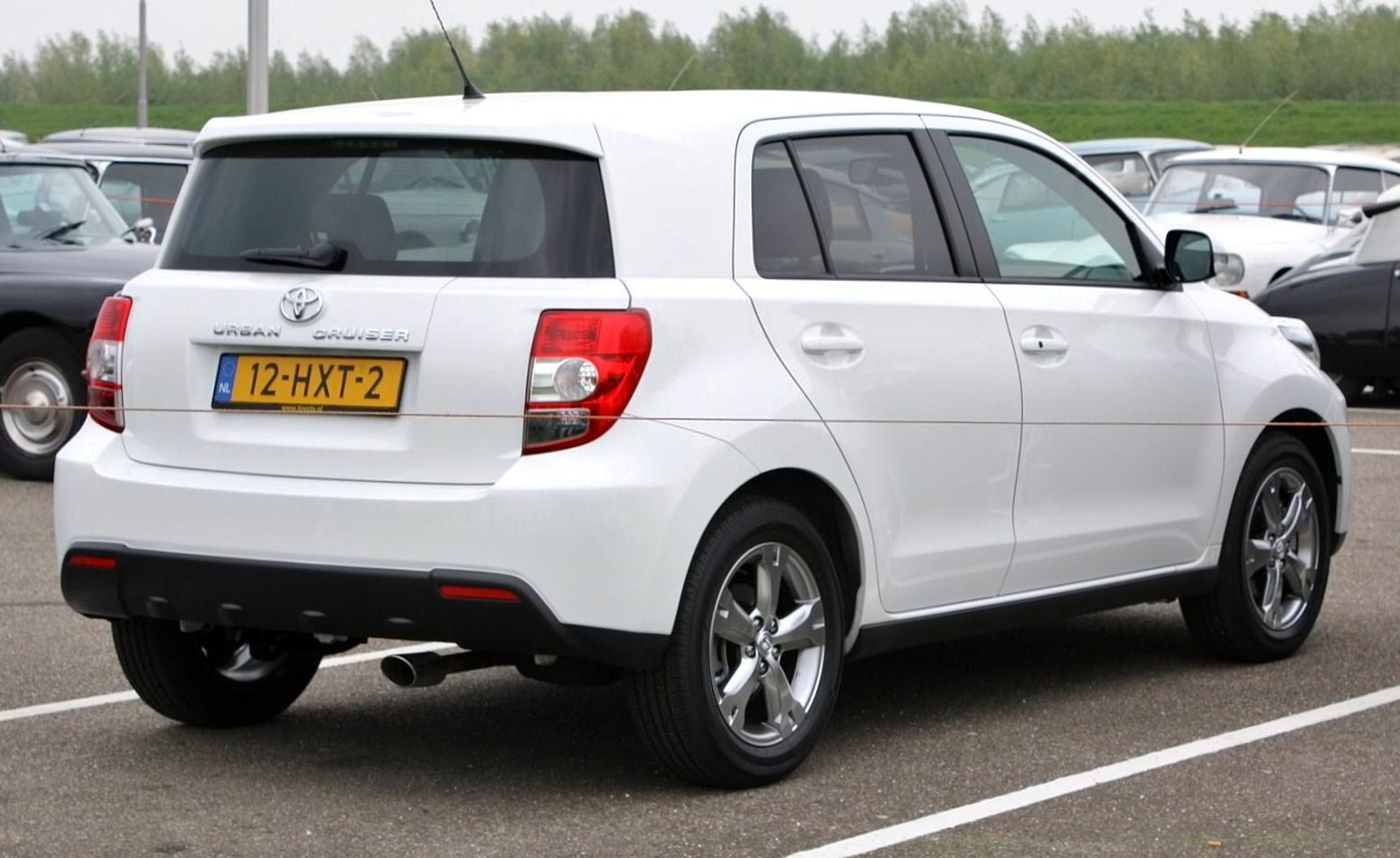
Toyota Urban Cruiser

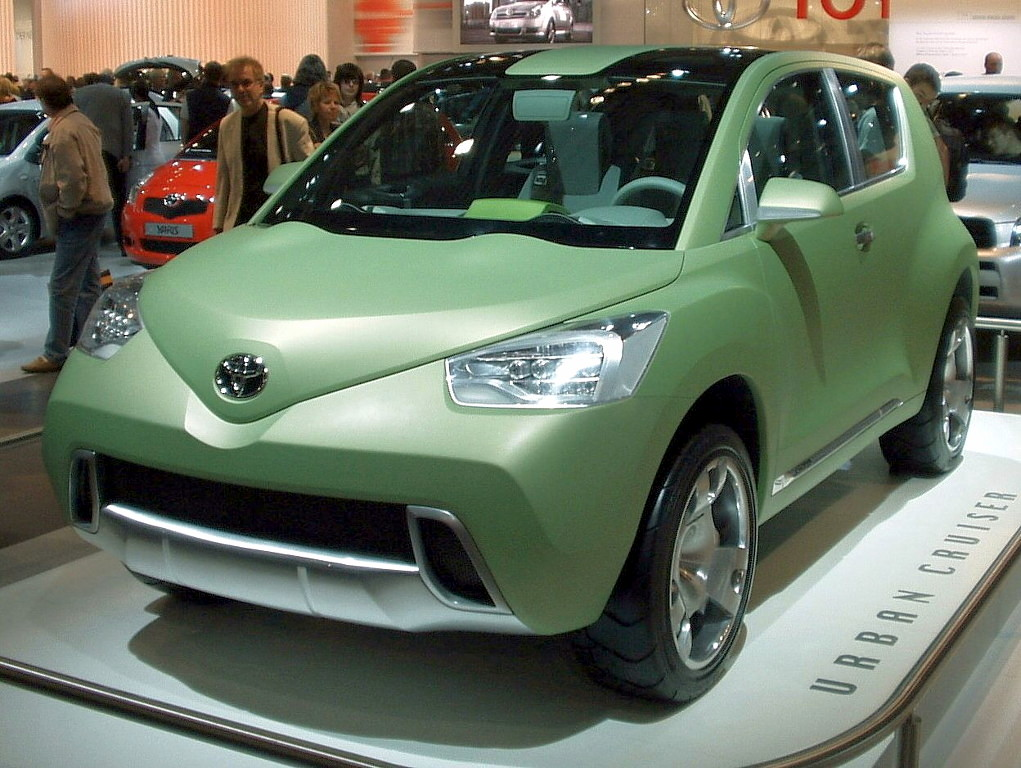
Toyota Urban Cruiser concept

The Urban Cruiser is a version of the second generation Ist, marketed in Europe beginning in 2008. It debuted at the March 2008 Geneva Motor Show and was sold in European markets until 2014. After a hiatus, its place in the lineup was filled by the Yaris Cross in 2021.

The "Urban Cruiser" nameplate has been reused twice: between 2020 and 2022 for the rebadged Suzuki Vitara Brezza, in 2022 for the rebadged Grand Vitara as the "Urban Cruiser Hyryder", in 2024 for the rebadged Suzuki Fronx as the "Urban Cruiser Taisor", and most recently in 2025 for the rebadged Suzuki e Vitara.

==== Mechanicals and emissions ====
The Urban Cruiser is powered by a 1,329 cc petrol engine that produces 99 PS (73 kW) and 132 N⋅m (97 lb⋅ft), or a 90 PS (66 kW), 205 N⋅m (151 lb⋅ft) 1,364 cc turbo-diesel. Front-wheel drive is standard, but the diesel model is also offered with an all-wheel drive option. Both came with a 6-speed manual transmission; there was no automatic option.

==== Safety ====
Despite its seven airbags, anti-lock brakes and traction control, the car received a relatively poor Euro NCAP safety rating of 3/5 stars.

== See also ==
- List of Toyota vehicles
