= Scion xD =

Japanese subcompact hatchback

Scion xD (XP110)
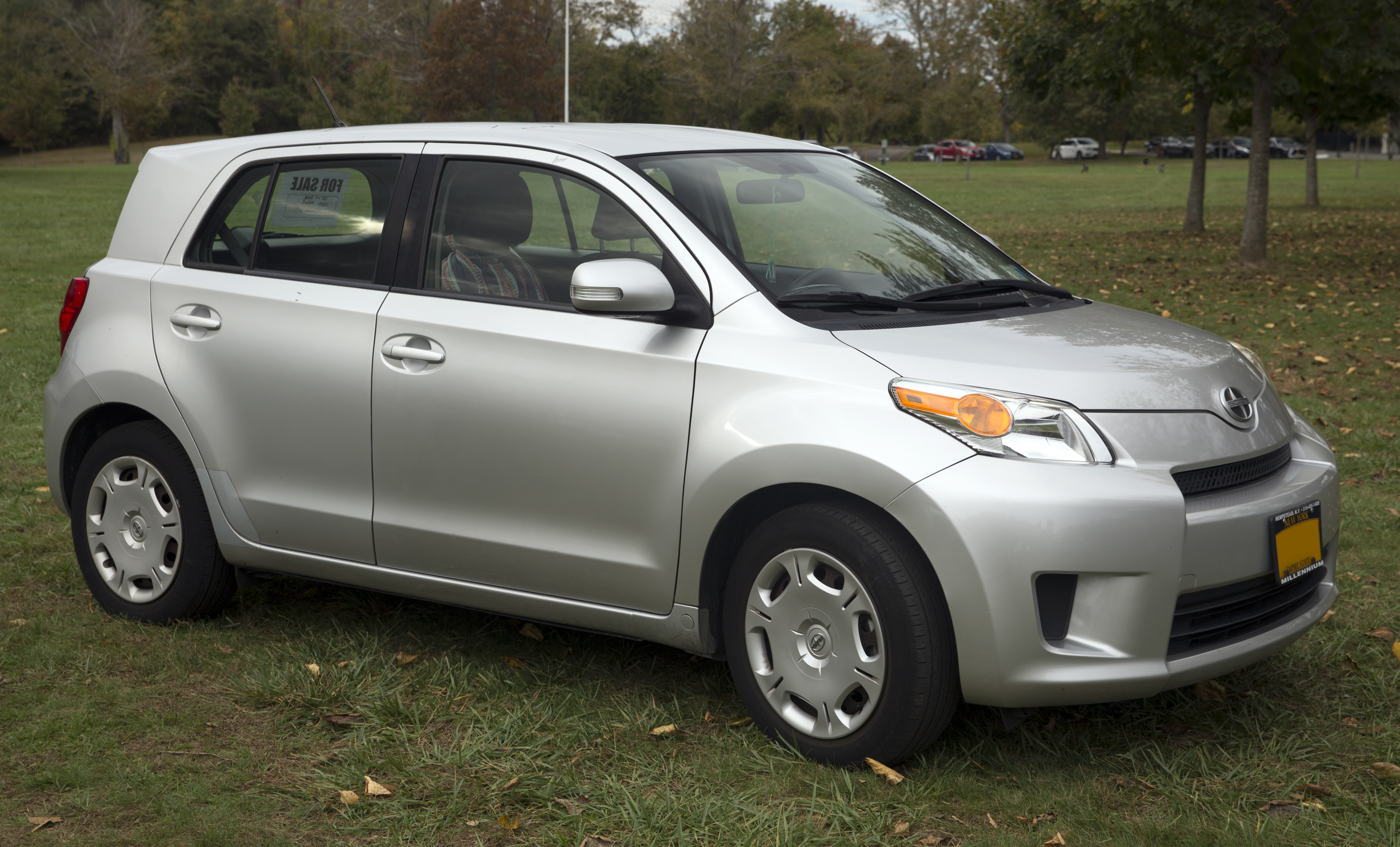
- 2008 Scion xD (US)

Overview
- Manufacturer: Toyota
- Also called: Toyota Ist (Japan, 2007–2016); Toyota Urban Cruiser (Europe and Latin America, 2008–2014)
- Production: 2007–2014
- Model years: 2008–2014
- Assembly: Japan: Kanegasaki, Iwate (Kanto Auto Works, 2007–2012); Ōhira, Miyagi (Toyota Motor East Japan, 2012–2014)
- Designer: Junho Kim and Masaaki Yagi (2005)

Body and chassis
- Class: Subcompact car
- Body style: 5-door hatchback
- Layout: Front-engine, front-wheel-drive
- Platform: Toyota B platform
- Related: Scion xB; Toyota Yaris Sedan (XP90); Toyota Ractis (XP100)

Powertrain
- Engine: 1.8 L 2ZR-FE I4
- Power output: 128 hp (95 kW; 130 PS)
- Transmission: 5-speed manual; 4-speed automatic

Dimensions
- Wheelbase: 2,460 mm (96.9 in)
- Length: 3,930 mm (154.7 in)
- Width: 1,725 mm (67.9 in)
- Height: 1,525 mm (60.0 in)
- Curb weight: 1,210 kg (2,668 lb)

Chronology
- Predecessor: Scion xA
- Successor: Scion iA; Toyota C-HR

The Scion xD (also known as the Toyota Ist in Japan, and, as the Toyota Urban Cruiser in Europe and Latin America) is a subcompact hatchback that was marketed in the U.S. and Canada by Japanese manufacturer Toyota beginning with the 2008 model year, as a five-door subcompact hatchback — replacing the xA. The Scion xD and the second generation xB were first shown to the public on February 8, 2007 at the Chicago Auto Show.

xD Sales began in mid-2007 in the USA and in 2011 for Canada and ended in 2014 — reaching just over 100,000.

== Features ==
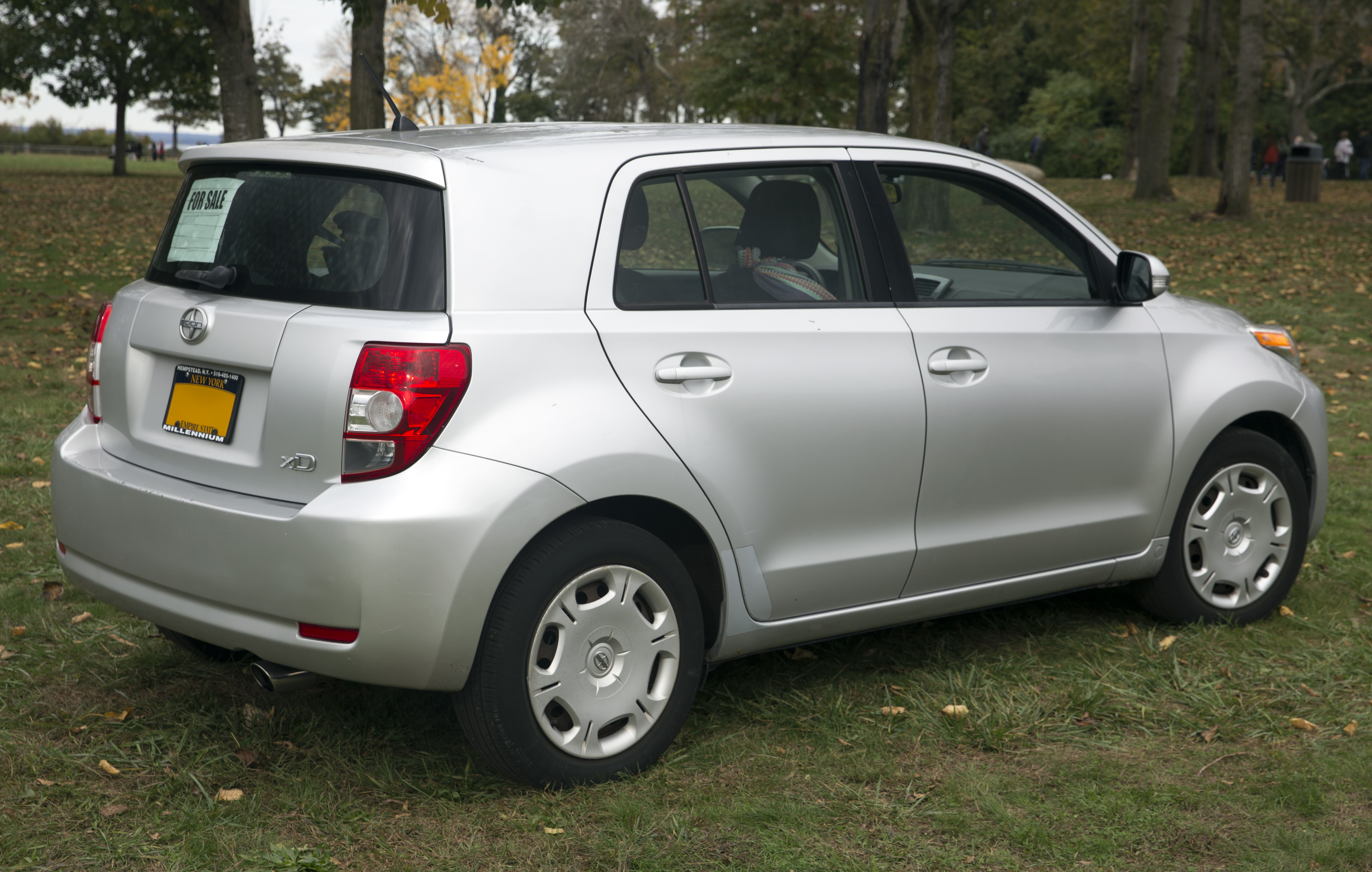
Rear view

Standard equipment included power locks, mirrors, and windows; 16-inch wheels; ABS, tire pressure monitoring system; Vehicle Stability Control (VSC) with Traction Control (TRAC); dual stage driver and passenger airbags; seat mounted driver and passenger side airbags; and side curtain airbags.

For 2008, a choice of three Pioneer audio head units were available. All sound systems featured six speakers and standard iPod connectivity. The base head unit had MP3, WMA, and AAC CD compatibility, and Scion's SSP equalizer presets, as well as orange lighting. The Premium head unit had all the features of the base unit, but a small LCD that can display pictures and movies downloaded from Pioneer's website; and user selectable orange or blue lighting schemes, blue and orange. A navigation system is also available. The SNS 100 system could play DVD movies in addition to GPS functionality and the features of the base system, aside from the backlit color choices.

For 2010, a choice of two new head units made by Alpine were available. Also, the iPod connectivity featured a USB port, along with an AUX jack located together, on the driver side of the vehicle. Previous model years with Pioneer had two separate inputs on both sides of the cigarette lighter/accessory plug, with the AUX jack port being on the driver side, and the iPod connectivity (specially made for Toyota) port located on the passenger side. The upgraded Alpine head unit featured a touchscreen, and HD radio tuner, along with an optional Navigation system upgrade.

For the 2011 model year, the Scion xD received a minor change to the grille, and sales began in Canada with the launch of the Scion brand there. 2014 was the last model year for the xD, although leftover new cars continued to be sold in the US market until 2016.

== Engines ==
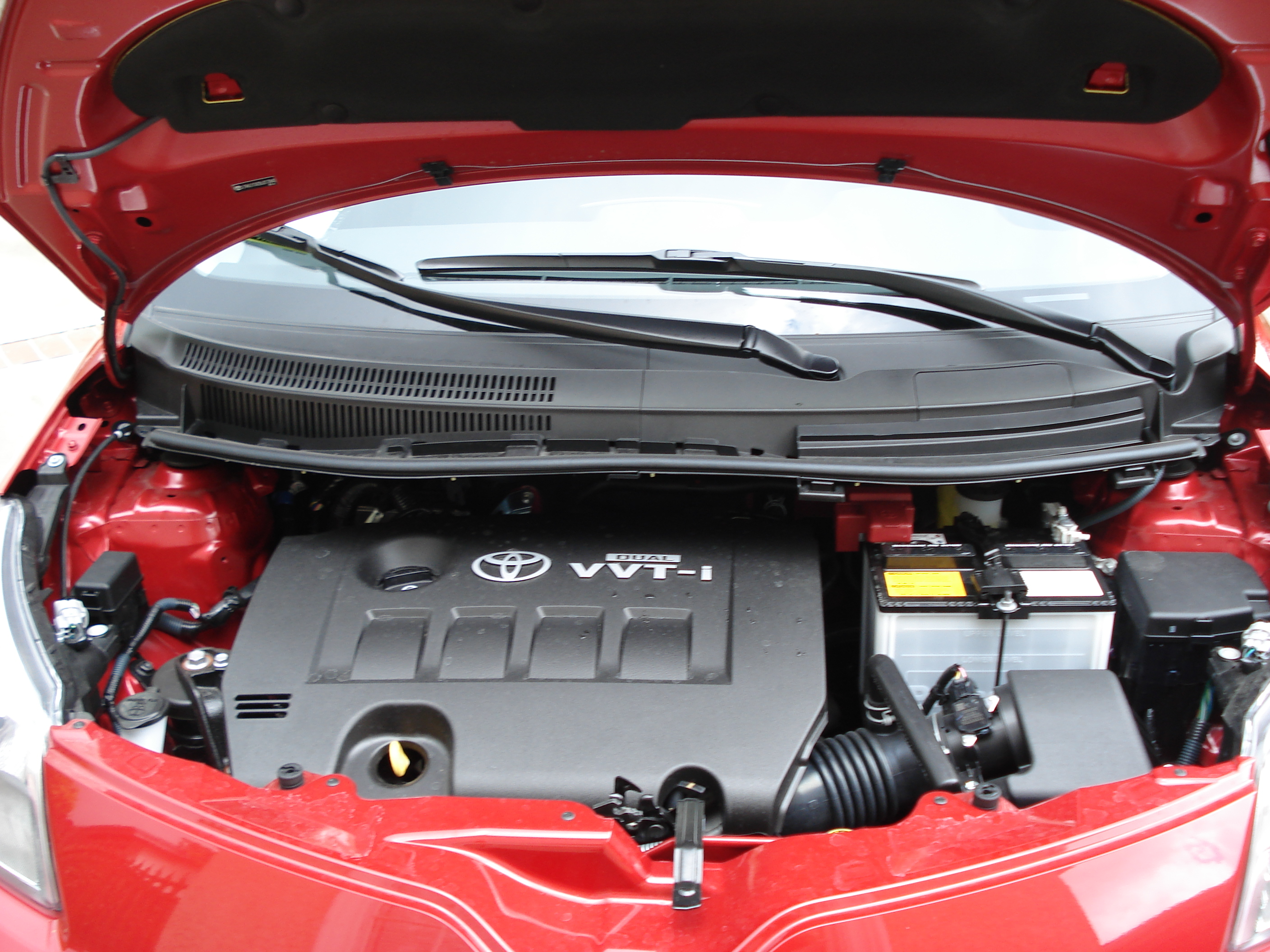
Engine

The front-wheel-drive xD comes with the 2ZR-FE DOHC 1.8-liter four-cylinder engine with dual VVT-i that makes 128 bhp (95 kW) and 125 lb⋅ft (169 N⋅m) of torque. It can be mated to either a five-speed manual or a four-speed automatic transmission. The United States Environmental Protection Agency estimated mileage for all model years is 27 mpg_{‑US} (8.7 L/100 km; 32 mpg_{‑imp}) city and 33 mpg_{‑US} (7.1 L/100 km; 40 mpg_{‑imp}) highway.

=== Performance ===
- Drag Coefficient: 0.32
- 0–60 mph (0–97 km/h): 8.3 seconds
- 1/4 mi (402 m): 16.5 seconds @ 86 MPH
- Top Speed: Limited to 120 mph (193 km/h)

== Similar models ==
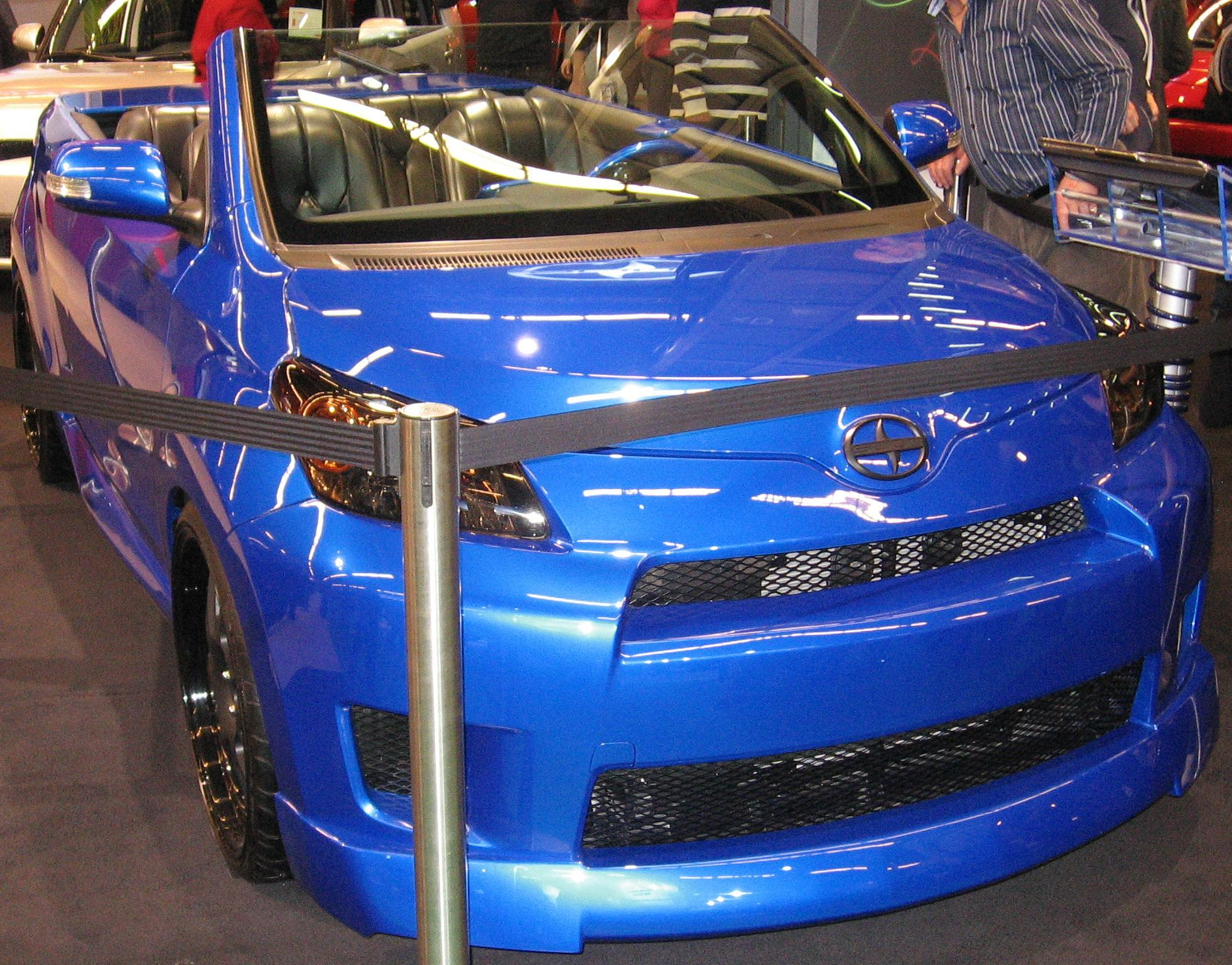
A convertible concept of the vehicle from the 2011 Montreal International Auto Show.

The xD is a second-generation Toyota Ist; the first was marketed in the US as a Scion xA. It is essentially a mildly elongated five-door Toyota Vitz. The Vitz is a three-door marketed in the US as the Yaris. Thus, the five-door Yaris was not offered in the U.S. market when the three-door and sedan were launched; however, as of 2009, the five-door Vitz is now offered in the US as the Yaris. The xD features the same sliding and reclining rear seat that is optional on the Yaris three-door. Unlike the Yaris and xA/first generation Ist, the xD's instrument gauges are located behind the steering wheel (as opposed to being centered atop the dashboard). As opposed to the Yaris and xA, the xD's speedometer and tachometer are on the same dial counter-rotating.

== Release Series ==
Similar to other Scion models, the xD adds Release Series limited edition models for each model year. Because of the short production runs (most dealers only got 2–3 of each RS model), these limited edition vehicles quickly sell out. Customers were able to pre-order at each dealership on a first-come, first-served basis. To the customer's benefit, Scion's "Pure Price" MSRP binds dealerships against market-demand vehicle mark-up.

- xD RS 1.0: only available in Hot Lava Orange with 2,000 units produced.
- xD RS 2.0: only available in Electric Wasabi with 1,600 units produced.
- xD RS 3.0: only available in xPRESSO Brown with 1,500 units produced.
- xD RS 4.0: only available in Blizzard Pearl with 800 units produced.

== Reliability ==
According to Consumer Reports, the xD was the most reliable new automobile for 2009 in the United States, with 83 percent fewer problems than average.

== Safety ==
Standard safety features include anti-lock brakes with electronic brake distribution and brake assist, traction control and six airbags.

The Scion xD received the top score of five stars in government crash tests for both front and rear passenger safety in a side impact collision as well as a four-star rating for driver and passenger safety in a front-end collision. The xD also received a four-star rollover rating, which means that there is an estimated 15 percent chance of rollover in a single vehicle collision. This is under the "old" system of government ranking. A new system has been devised for the 2011 model year of all vehicles. However, the closely related Toyota Urban Cruiser scored a poor 3/5 stars in the Euro NCAP tests.

Starting with the 2010 model year, all xDs come standard with vehicle stability control.

== Sales ==
In the U.S., sales of the xD fell to 9,573 in 2011 from 32,603 in 2006.

Calendar year	US sales
2007	10,948
2008	27,665
2009	14,499
2010	10,110
2011	9,573
2012	10,756
2013	9,005
2014	7,377
2015	794
2016	9
