= Scion xA =

Japanese subcompact hatchback

Scion xA (XP60)
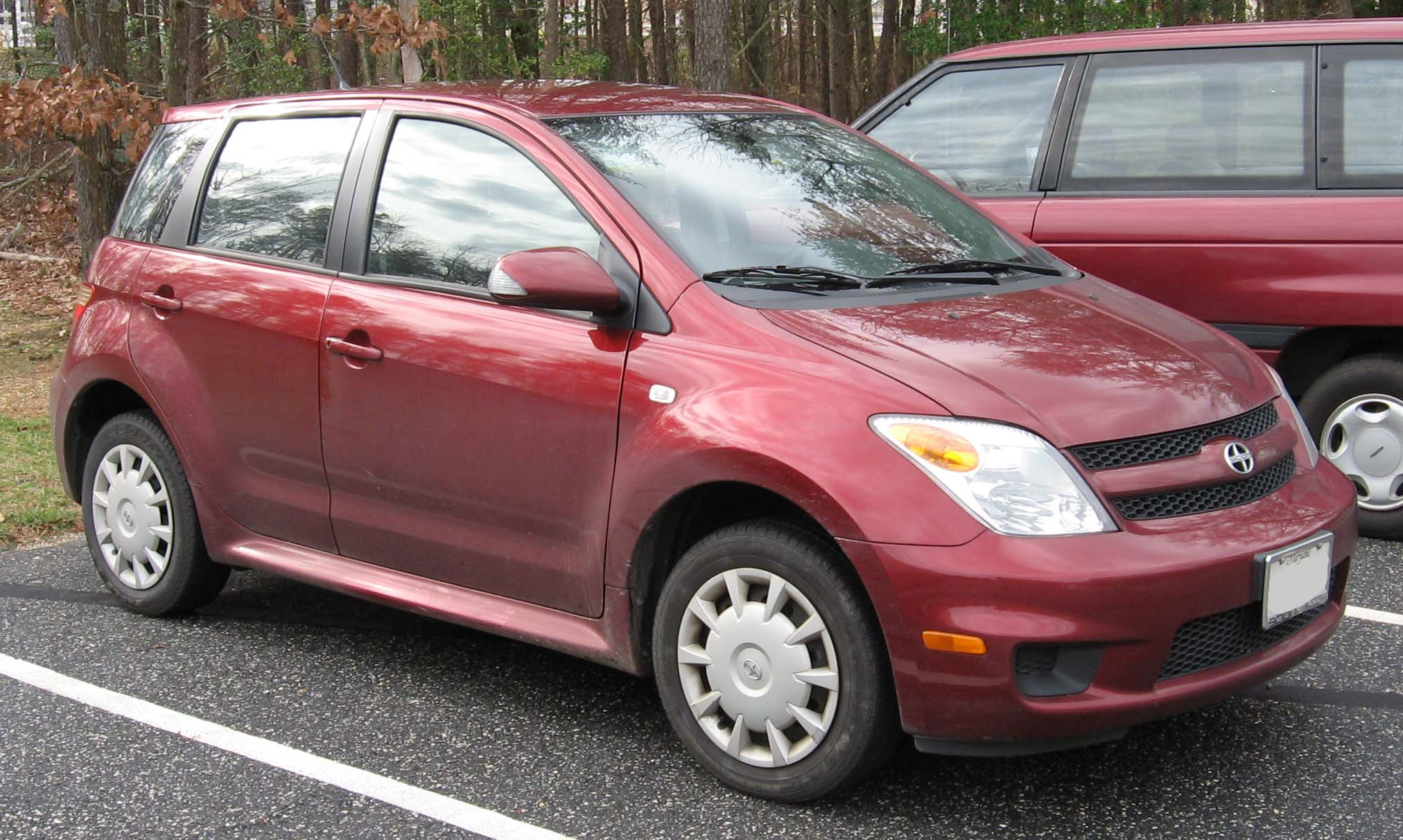
- Facelift model 2006

Overview
- Manufacturer: Toyota
- Also called: Toyota Ist (Japan, 2002–2007); Toyota xA (Middle East)
- Production: 2003–2006
- Model years: 2004-2007
- Assembly: Japan: Kanegasaki, Iwate (Kanto Auto Works)
- Designer: Masanari Sakae (2000)

Body and chassis
- Class: Subcompact car
- Body style: 5-door hatchback
- Layout: Front-engine, front-wheel-drive
- Platform: Toyota NBC platform
- Related: Scion xB/Toyota bB (XP30); Toyota Echo sedan/coupé; Toyota Echo hatchback; Toyota Yaris Verso/FunCargo

Powertrain
- Engine: 1.5 L 1NZ-FE I4 (gasoline)
- Power output: 103–108 hp (77–81 kW; 104–109 PS)
- Transmission: 5-speed manual; 4-speed automatic

Dimensions
- Wheelbase: 93.3 in (2,370 mm)
- Length: 154.1 in (3,915 mm)
- Width: 66.7 in (1,695 mm)
- Height: 60.2 in (1,530 mm)
- Curb weight: 2,341 lb (1,062 kg)

Chronology
- Successor: Scion xD

The Scion xA is a five-door subcompact hatchback marketed in the US from 2004 to 2006 — as an export model of the Japanese domestic market Toyota Ist. Based on the first generation Toyota Vitz hatchback, the xA shared a platform with the Toyota Platz sedan.

== History ==
The xA received a minor facelift for the 2006 model year, before importation ended in December 2006. Power and torque figures dropped marginally. The xA's successor, the xD was delivered to US dealerships beginning in August 2007 as a 2008 model.

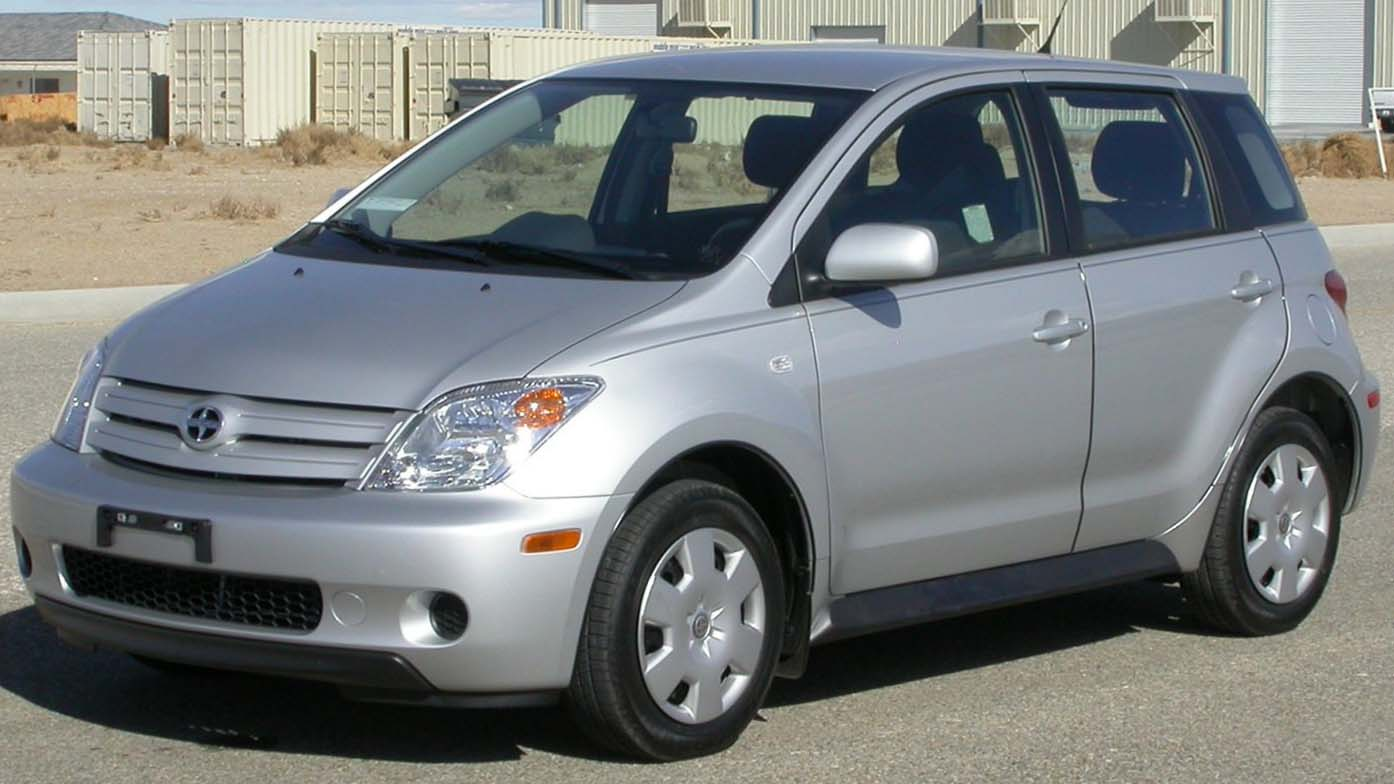
Front (pre-facelift)

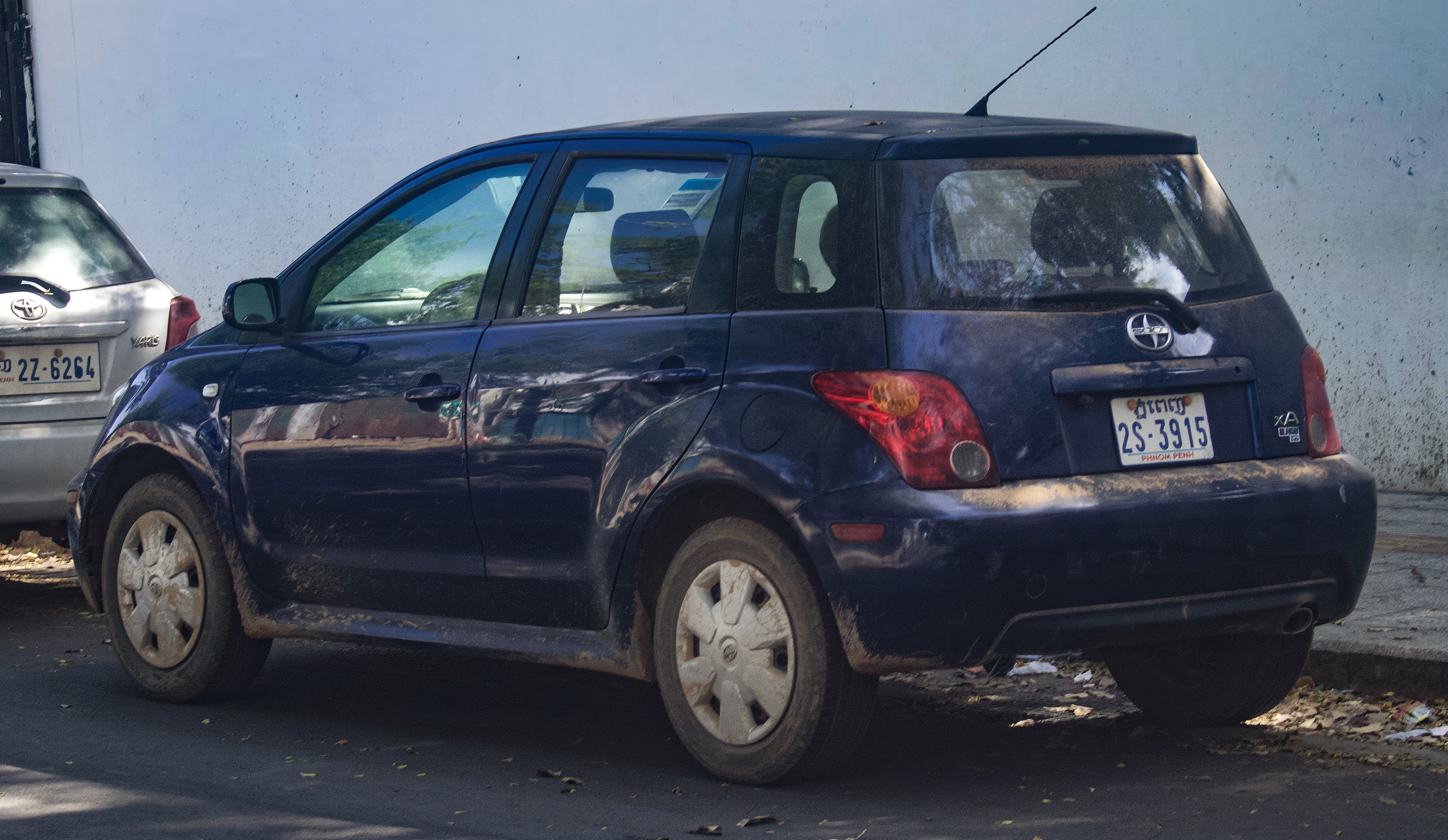
Rear (pre-facelift)

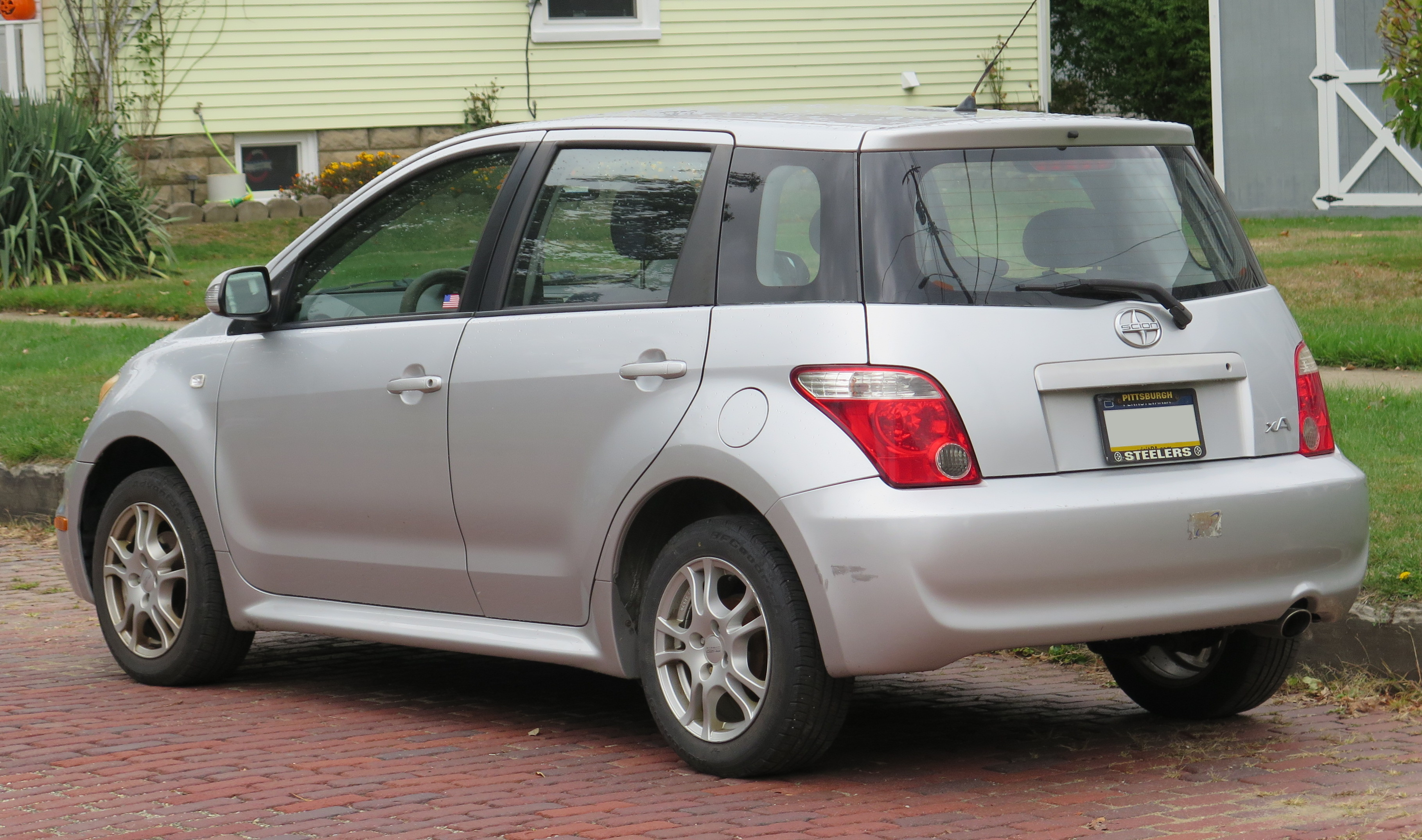
Rear (facelift)

=== Release series ===
Beginning in late spring 2004 with the launch of the 2004 Scion xB RS 1.0 (Release Series 1.0) Scion decided to create limited edition vehicles pre-packaged with exclusive accessories in limited quantities. Limited Edition vehicles from a marketing standpoint were used to create a buzz for the brandname, with their exterior colors tending to be loud or bright hues (i.e. orange, yellow, red, blue, green). Because of the growing popularity of the Scion product line and the scarce production runs (most dealers only got 2-3 of each RS model), these limited edition vehicles quickly sell out. Preordering is available at each dealership on a first-come, first-served basis. To the customer's benefit, Scion's "Pure Price" MSRP binds dealerships against market-demand vehicle mark-up. Naturally, resale values of Release Series vehicles command a premium because of their packaged options and scarcity.

2005

- xA RS 1.0: Available only in Absolutely Red, standard equipment included a sports grille and color-keyed rear spoiler, power Webasto factory moonroof, 6 spoke alloy wheels, color-keyed ground effects and vehicle stability control (VSC). Only 1,550 units were produced

2005

- xA RS 2.0 only available in Spectra Blue Mica with 1,700 units produced

2006

- xA RS 3.0 only available in Stingray Metallic light blue with 2,100 units produced

== Technical data ==
- Engine:
  - 1.5 L DOHC I4 engine.
  - 108 hp (81 kW) @ 6000 rpm (revised to 103 hp [77 kW] in 2006)
  - 105 lb⋅ft (142 N⋅m) of torque @ 4200 rpm (revised to 101 lb⋅ft [137 N⋅m] in 2006)
- Platform: NCP61
- Cargo volume: 11.7 cu ft (331 L)
- EPA fuel economy ratings:

U.S. Environmental Protection Agency (EPA) fuel economy ratings
| Year | Automatic Transmission | | | Manual Transmission | | |
| | mpg US | mpg IMP | L/100 km | mpg US | mpg IMP | L/100 km |
|---|---|---|---|---|---|---|
| 2004 | 32/38 | 38/46 | 7.4/6.2 | 32/38 | 38/46 | 7.4/6.2 |
| 2005/2006 | 31/38 | 37/46 | 7.6/6.2 | 33/39 | 38/44 | 7.4/6.4 |

- 2008 EPA revised fuel economy ratings for the 2004 model are 27 mpg_{‑US} (8.7 L/100 km; 32 mpg_{‑imp})/ 34 mpg_{‑US} (6.9 L/100 km; 41 mpg_{‑imp}) for both manual and automatic transmission. For the 2005 and 2006 models, fuel economy is estimated at 27 mpg_{‑US} (8.7 L/100 km; 32 mpg_{‑imp})/34 mpg_{‑US} (6.9 L/100 km; 41 mpg_{‑imp}) for vehicles with a manual transmission and 27 mpg_{‑US} (8.7 L/100 km; 32 mpg_{‑imp})/35 mpg_{‑US} (6.7 L/100 km; 42 mpg_{‑imp}) for those with an automatic transmission.
- Drag Coefficient: 0.31
- 0-60 mph: 8.8 seconds
- 1/4 mile: 16.7 seconds at 81.3 miles per hour (130.8 km/h)
- Top speed: Limited to 110 mph (177 km/h)

Some of the revisions for 2006 include modified bumpers and side skirts, as well as turn signal indicators on the side mirrors and audio controls located on the steering wheel. The xA was also the first production vehicle to offer an optional iPod input with head unit display, as well as a more refined, user-friendly head unit and more exterior colors.

== Sales ==
| Calendar Year | US |
|---|---|
| 2003 | 3,962 |
| 2004 | 24,184 |
| 2005 | 28,033 |
| 2006 | 32,603 |
| 2007 | 9,547 |
| 2008 | 39 |
| 2009 | 3 |
