= Toyota Platz =

Subcompact car

Toyota Platz (XP10)
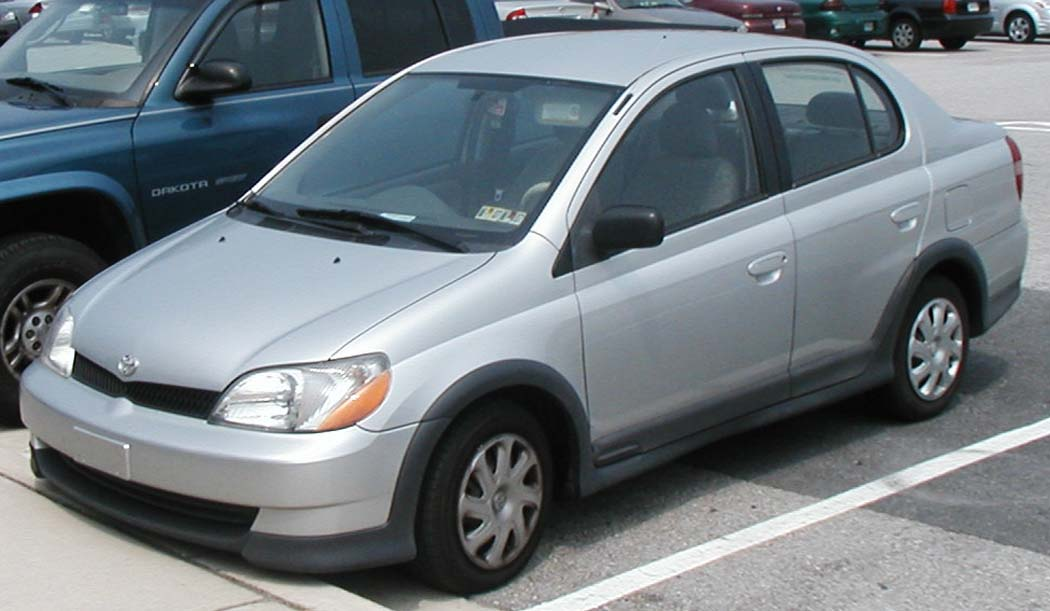
- 2000-2002 Echo sedan (US)

Overview
- Manufacturer: Toyota
- Also called: Toyota Yaris; Toyota Echo (Middle East, Oceania, Singapore, Hong Kong, and North America); Xiali 2000/Yaku/Vela (China)
- Production: August 1999 – November 2005; 2000–2012 (China)
- Model years: 2000–2005
- Assembly: Japan: Toyota, Aichi (Takaoka plant); China: Tianjin (Tianjin FAW)
- Designer: Yoshiharu Nakajima

Body and chassis
- Class: Subcompact car
- Body style: 2-door sedan (North America only); 4-door sedan
- Layout: Front-engine, front-wheel-drive; Front-engine, four-wheel-drive (Japan only)
- Platform: Toyota NBC platform
- Related: Toyota Vitz (XP10); Toyota Yaris Verso/FunCargo; Toyota Vios (XP40); Toyota Ist/Scion xA (XP60)

Powertrain
- Engine: Petrol: 1.0 L 1SZ-FE I4; 1.3 L 8A-FE I4 (China); 1.3 L 2NZ-FE I4; 1.5 L 5A-FE I4 (China); 1.5 L 1NZ-FE I4; 1.6 L CA4GB2 I4 (China)
- Transmission: 5-speed manual; 4-speed automatic

Dimensions
- Wheelbase: 2,370 mm (93.3 in)
- Length: 1999–2002: 4,145 mm (163.2 in); 2002–2005: 4,180 mm (164.6 in)
- Width: 1,660 mm (65.4 in)
- Height: 1,500 mm (59.1 in) (FWD); 1,510 mm (59.4 in) (4WD)
- Curb weight: 4-door: 850–1,010 kg (1,874–2,227 lb); 2-door: 923 kg (2,035 lb)

Chronology
- Predecessor: Toyota Tercel
- Successor: Toyota Belta/Yaris sedan/Vios (XP90)

The Toyota Platz (Japanese:トヨタ・プラッツ, Toyota Purattsu) is a subcompact car that was manufactured in Japan by Toyota from 1999 until 2005, when it was replaced by the Belta. Designated by Toyota as the XP10 series, the Platz was also sold in export markets as either the Toyota Yaris or Toyota Echo. The "Yaris" and "Echo" names were also given to the export version of the related Japanese market Vitz hatchback, from which the Platz derives. In Japan, it was available at the Toyopet Store and the Netz Toyota Store dealerships.

== Etymology ==
The name "Platz" is German for "space" (as defined by "the interior room is spacious"). Only straight-four engines were fitted to the Platz, which was sold in Japan as a four-door sedan only. A two-door version was also available in North America where the car was badged "Echo".

== History ==
The Platz was introduced in 1999 as a four-door sedan sold internationally, with a two-door version exclusive to North America following for the 2000 model year. The Platz is closely related to the Vitz hatchback with which it shares front doors, a common interior and mechanical componentry. The running gear is also shared to a lesser degree with the ist and bB, sold in the United States as the Scion xA and xB respectively, and the JDM-only WiLL Vi. The same platform is the base for the JDM-only Probox and Succeed wagons.

In the United States, the Echo sold almost 50,000 units in its first year, with just half that many in 2003. The Echo was an element of Toyota Project Genesis, a failed effort to bring younger buyers to the marque in the United States. The Echo sold in high volumes in Canada, where Toyota also offered the three- and five-door hatchback versions of the Vitz badged as the Echo beginning with the 2004 model year to replace the two-door Echo (which was dropped after 2003). The two-door remained on sale in the United States until the 2005 model year along with the four-door, while the hatchback variants were never sold there. It was the predecessor to the current North American Yaris, sharing many identical features, such as the odd (and somewhat controversial) center placement of the speedometer and gauges, as opposed to in front of the steering wheel. Power options on the Echo are a rare find; most models are equipped with manual windows and locks, air conditioning, and a six-speaker audio system with a CD and/or a cassette player.

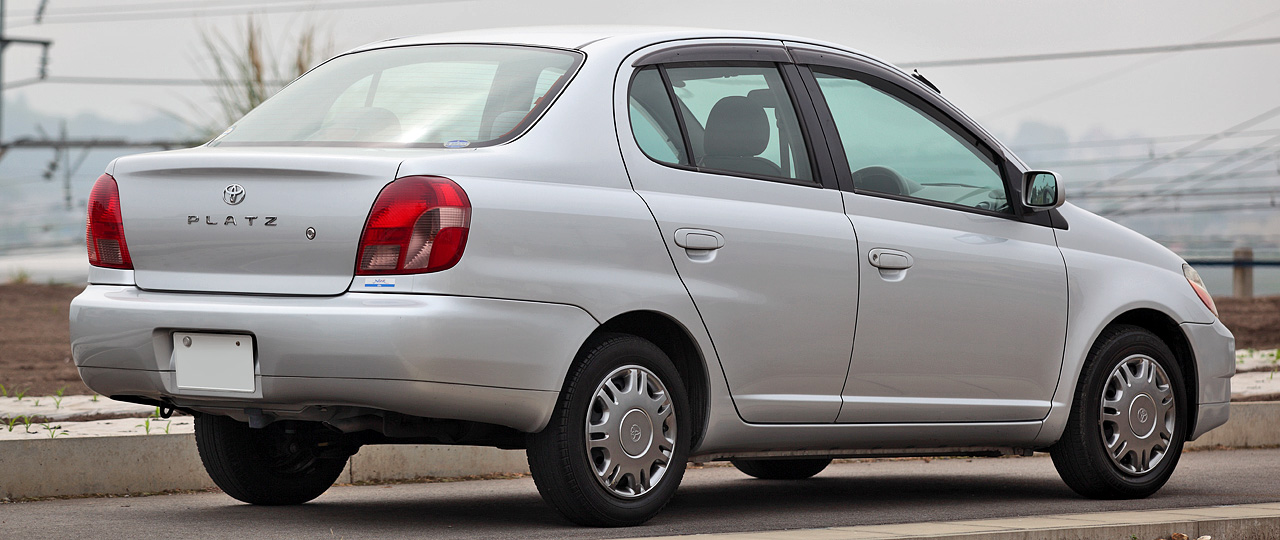
Pre-facelift: Toyota Platz sedan (Japan)

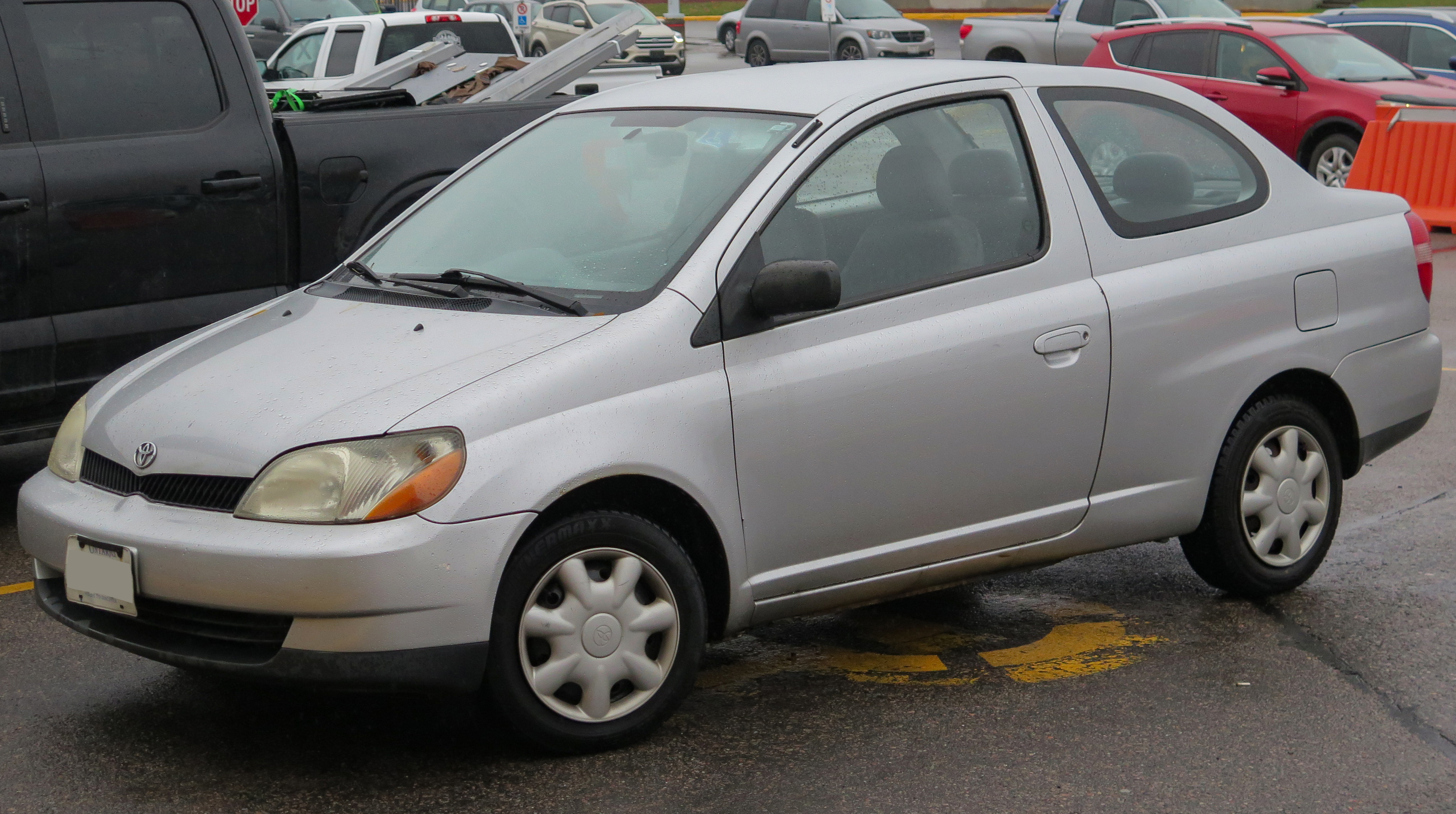
Pre-facelift: Toyota Echo 2-door (Canada)

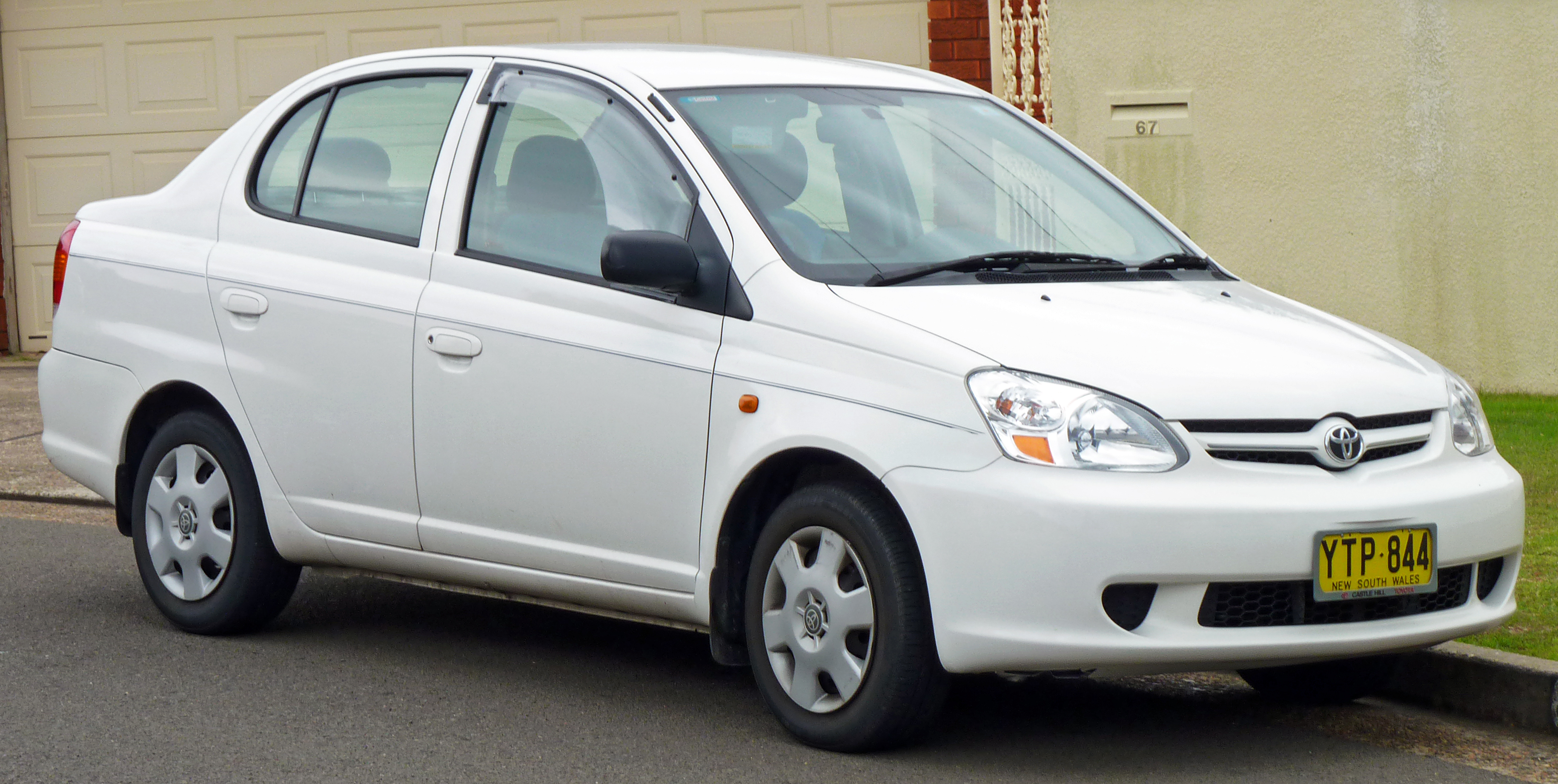
Facelift: Toyota Echo sedan (Australia)

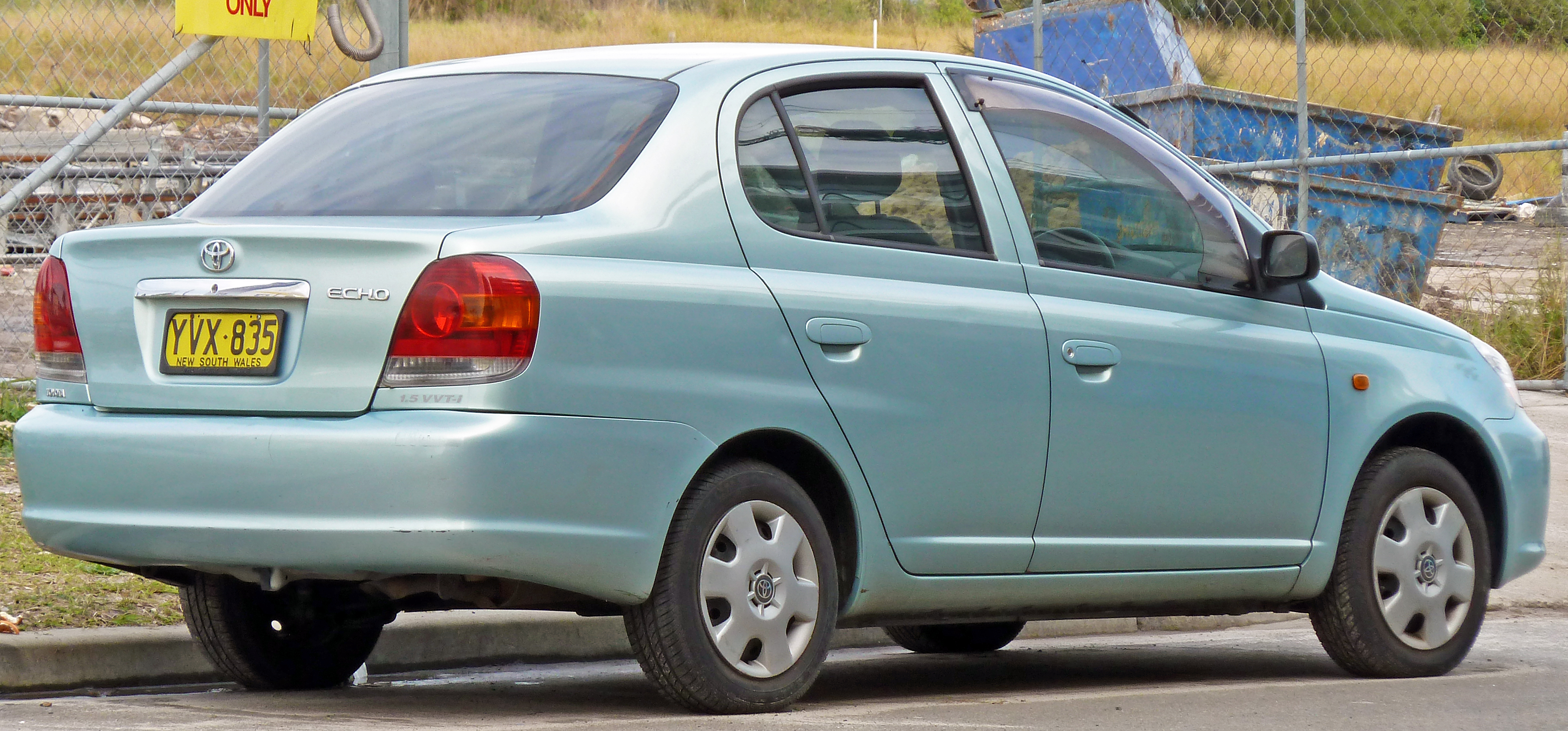
Facelift: Toyota Echo sedan (Australia)

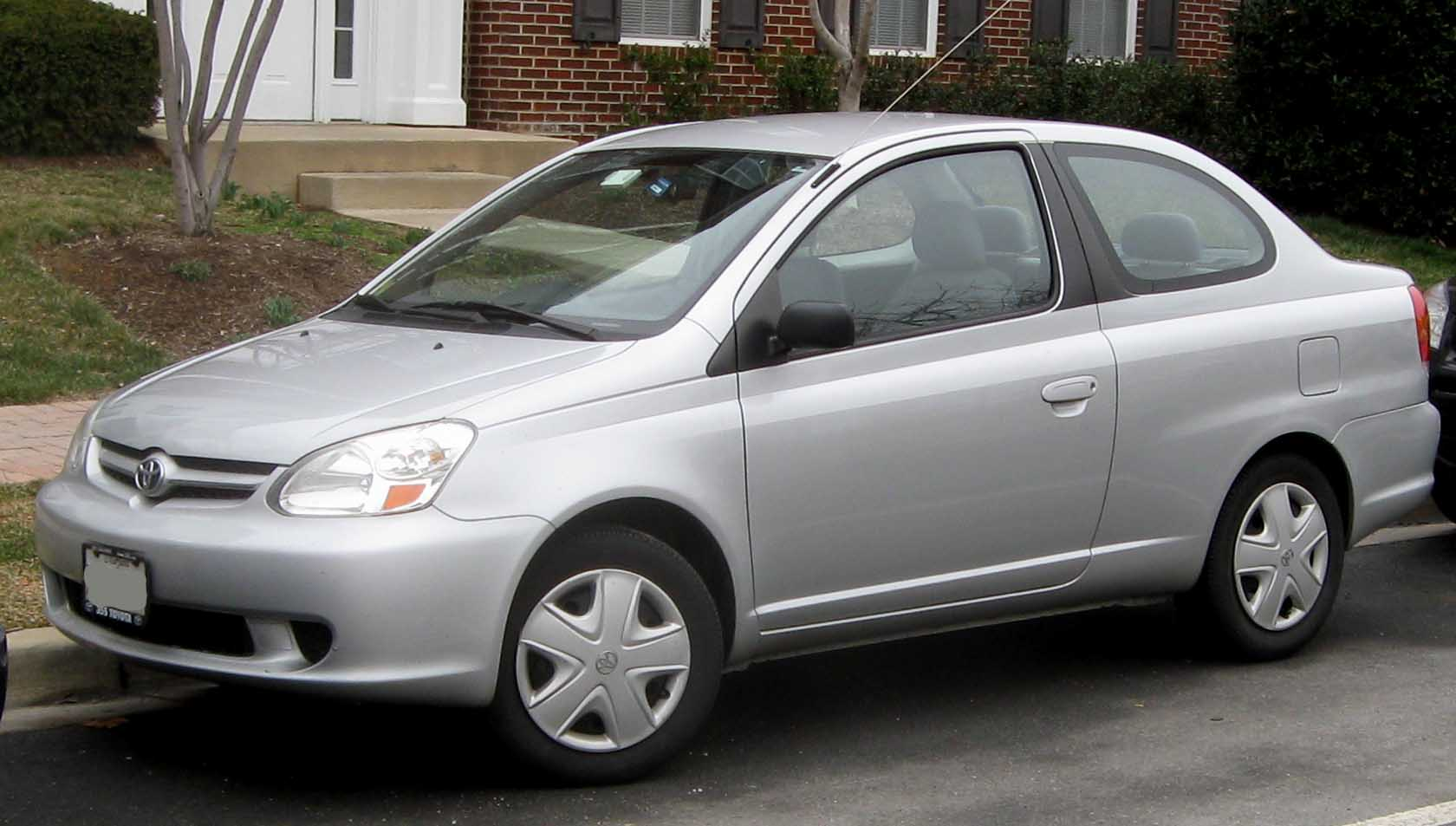
Facelift: Toyota Echo 2-door (US)

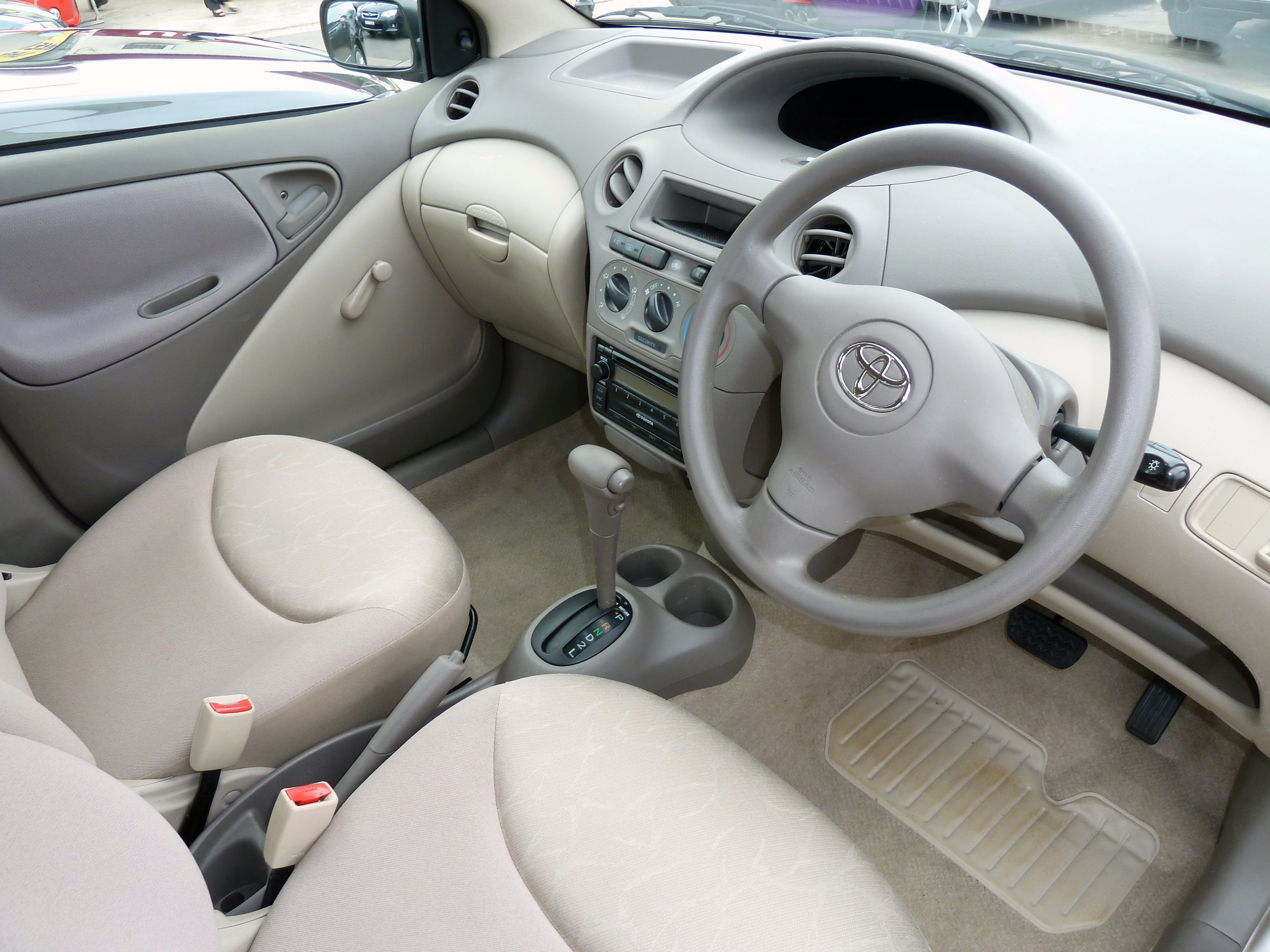
Interior

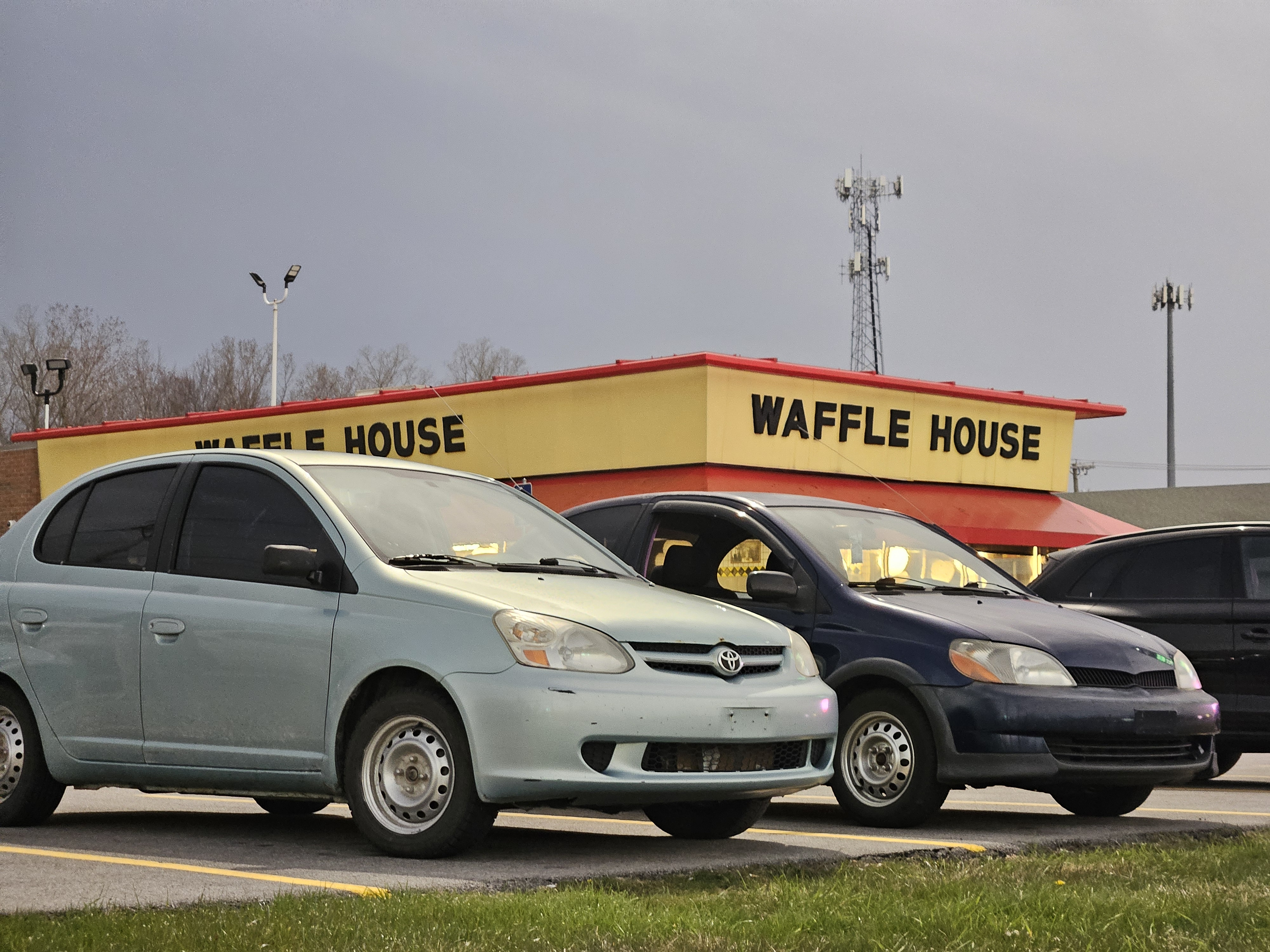
Facelift and pre-facelift Toyota Echo (US)

== Xiali 2000/Vela ==
In China, the Platz was marketed as the Xiali 2000 from December 2000 to March 2004. The car was then lightly facelifted and renamed as the Xiali Vela, which sold from March 2004 to 2012. It came with the 1.3-litre 8A-FE, 1.5-litre 5A-FE or a 1.6-litre Chinese-made engine known as the CA4GB2. A five-speed manual gearbox was standard on all models. From 2002 to 2003, a limited-edition model was sold the Xiali Yaku and available with a 4-speed automatic gearbox.

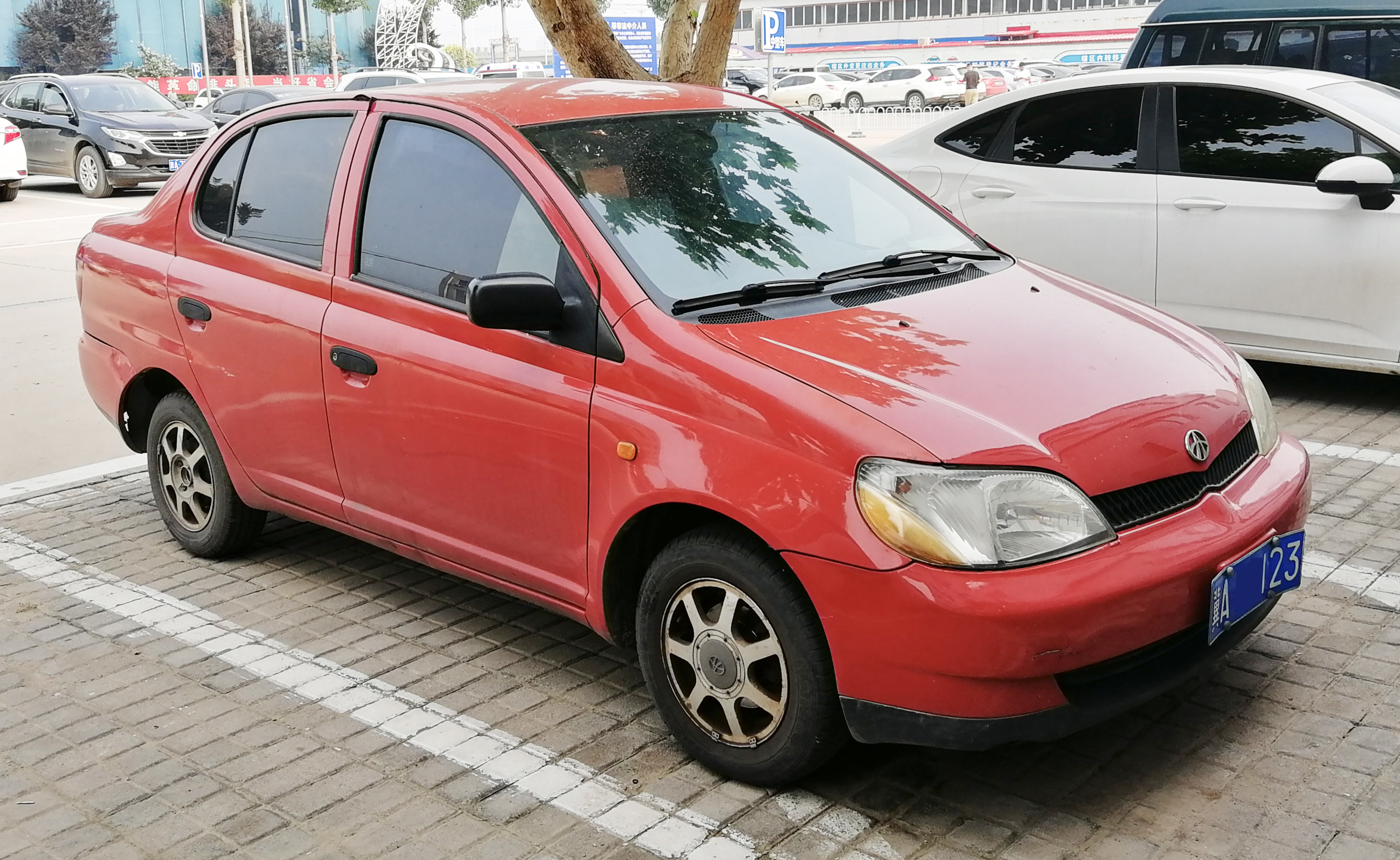
Xiali 2000

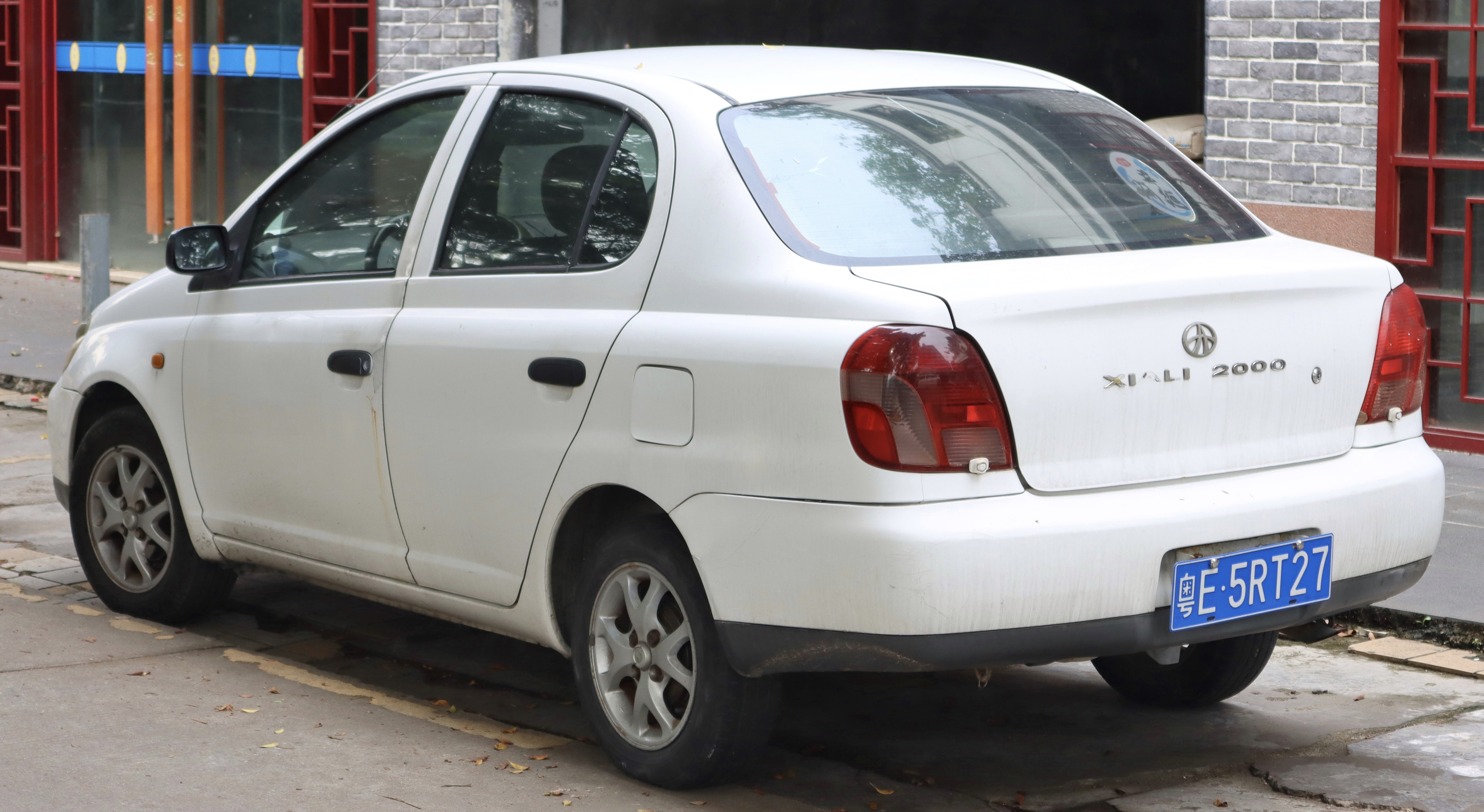
Xiali 2000

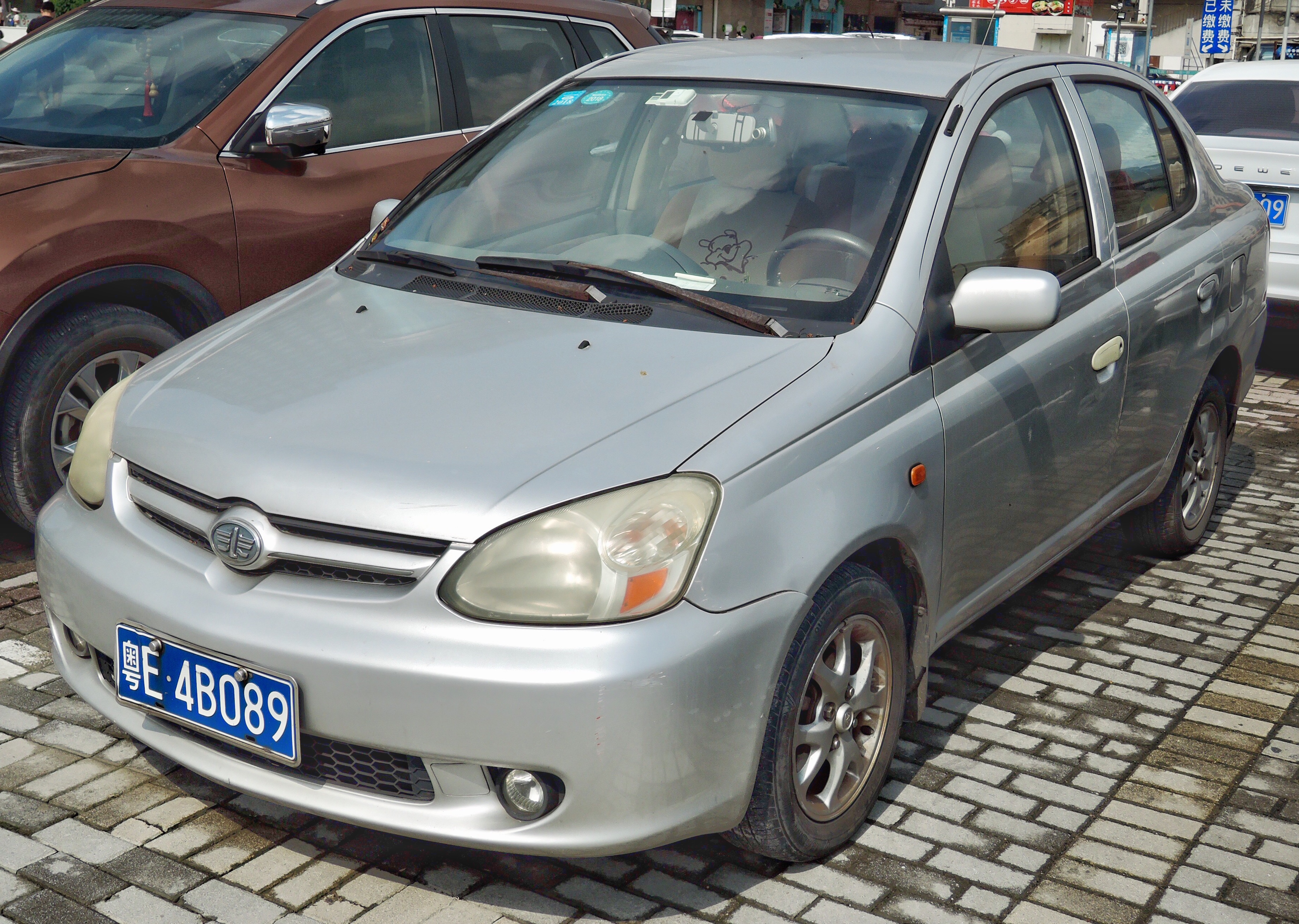
Tianjin Vela

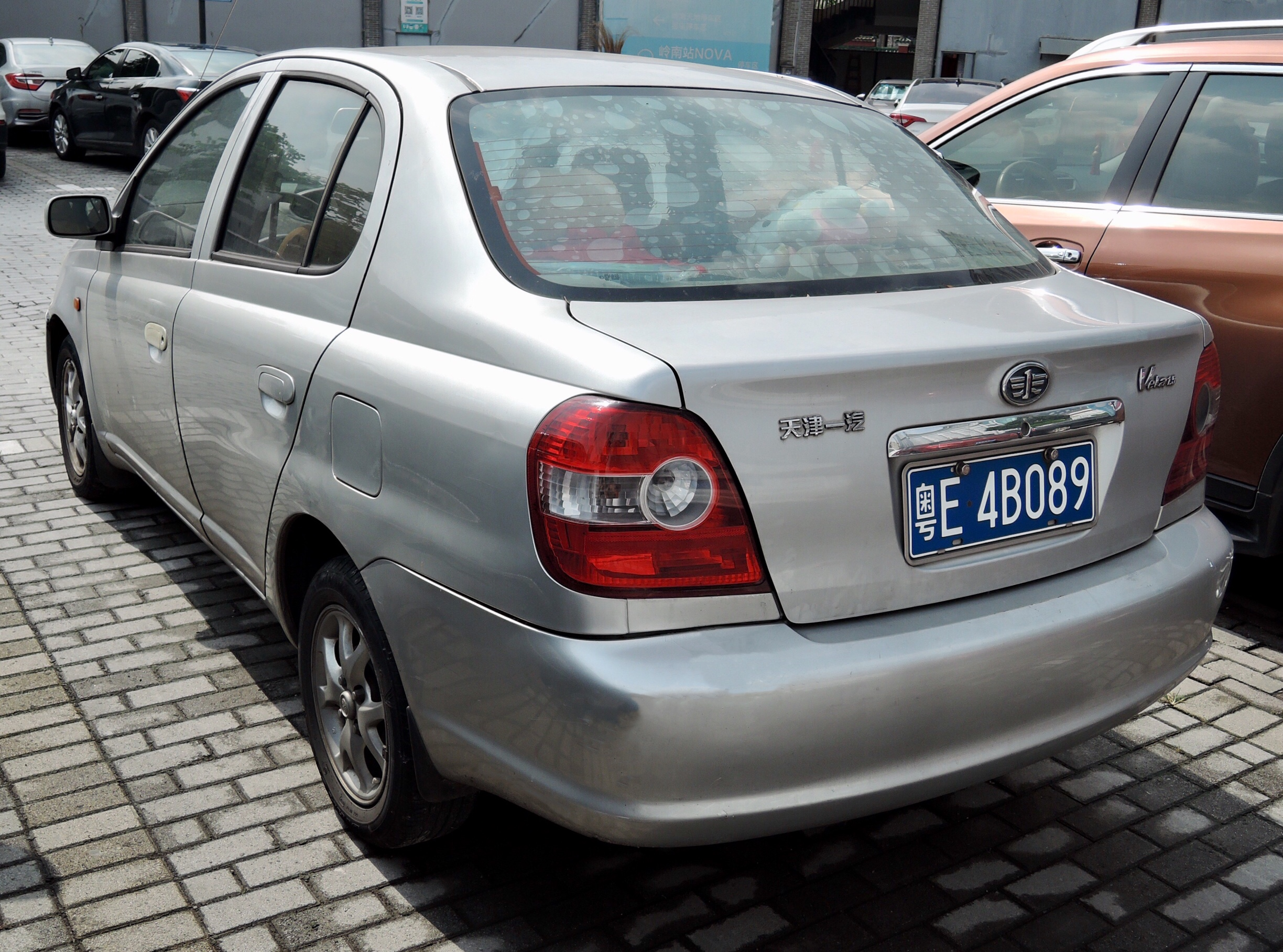
Tianjin Vela

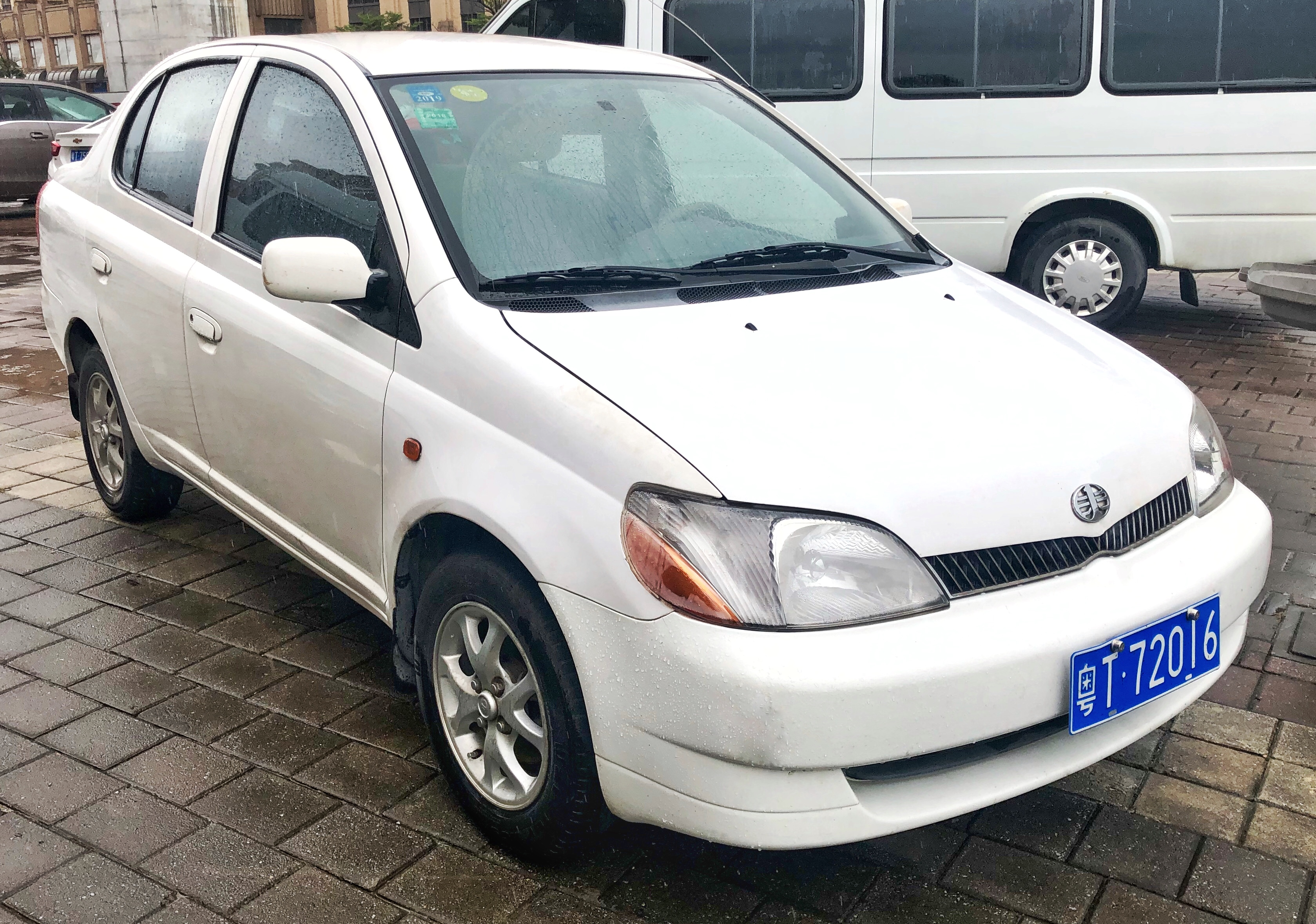
Xiali Yaku

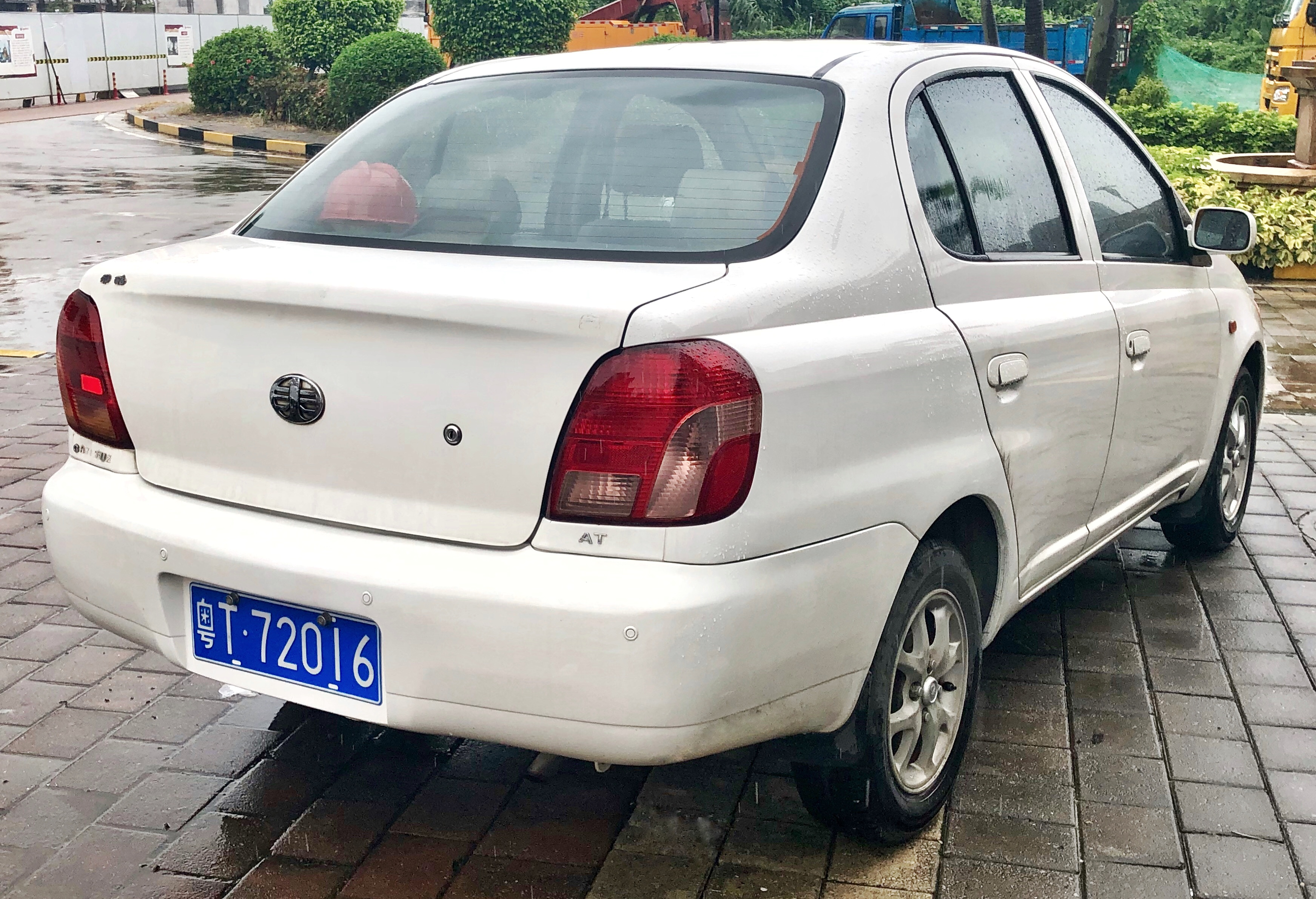
Xiali Yaku

== Safety ==
The 2010 edition of Monash University's Used Car Safety Ratings (UCSR), found that the XP10 provides a "poor" (two out of five stars) level of occupant safety protection in the event of an accident.

== Sales ==
Year
Year	United States
1999	10,490
2000	48,876
2001	42,464
2002	27,985
2003	26,167
2004	3,899
2005	1,544
2006	27
2007	7
Total sales (Units): 161,459
