= List of Toyota vehicles =

Toyota has produced and marketed vehicles since 1935. Most vehicles sold today are designed and manufactured by Toyota, while some vehicles are produced by other companies and supplied to Toyota through an OEM supply basis. Many models are limited to some regions, while some others are marketed worldwide. This list does not include vehicles from Lexus, Scion, Daihatsu or Hino brands.

== Current production vehicles ==
=== Passenger cars ===
Body style	Model			Current generation			Vehicle description
Body style	Image	Name(s)	Introduction (cal. year)	Model code	Introduction (cal. year)	Main markets	Vehicle description
Sedan		Avalon	1994	XX50	2018	China	Full-size sedan mainly produced and marketed in North America and the Middle East (both until 2022) and China. Hybrid powertrain is available.
Sedan		bZ3	2022	EA10	2022	China	Battery electric compact sedan co-developed with BYD.
Sedan		bZ7	2025	EP10	2025	China	Battery electric full-size sedan co-developed with GAC.
Sedan		Camry	1982	XV80	2023	Global (except for most parts of Europe, and all of Japan)	Mid-size sedan (D-segment) marketed globally. Hybrid powertrain is standard/optional.
Sedan		Century Sedan	1967	G60	2018	Japan	Traditional luxury flagship sedan, mainly marketed in Japan. Hybrid powertrain is standard.
Sedan		Corolla	1966	E210	2018	All markets except India	Compact sedan (C-segment) marketed globally. Hybrid powertrain is optional.
Sedan		Levin L	2021	E210	2021	China	Long-wheelbase versions of the Corolla for the Chinese market.
Sedan		Crown	1955	S230/232 (sedan)	2023	Japan and China	Rear-wheel-drive luxury sedan available in hybrid and fuel cell hydrogen powertrains.
Sedan		Crown	1955	S235 (crossover)	2022	Japan, North America, etc.	All-wheel-drive luxury crossover sedan. Hybrid powertrain is standard.
Sedan		Mirai	2014	JPD20	2020	Japan, North America, Europe, etc.	Fuel-cell/hydrogen executive sedan.
Sedan		Prius	1997	XW60	2022	Japan, North America, Europe, etc.	Hybrid/plug-in hybrid compact liftback (C-segment). The first mass-marketed hybrid electric car. Formerly sold in Australasia and India (within South Asia).
Sedan		Vios/ Yaris	2002	XP150 AC100	2013 2022	Emerging markets in Asia, Africa and Latin America (also in Taiwan)	Subcompact sedan (B-segment) produced primarily for emerging markets. The Vios nameplate is used in China, Taiwan and Southeast Asian countries, while the Yaris nameplate is used in China, India, Middle East, Latin America, and Thailand (as the Yaris Ativ).
Hatchback		Agya/ Wigo	2013	A350 (Note: Daihatsu model code)	2023	Southeast Asia and parts of Latin America	City car developed by Daihatsu for emerging markets, rebadged Daihatsu Ayla.
Hatchback		Aqua	2011	XP210	2021	Japan	Hybrid-only subcompact hatchback (B-segment). First generation was marketed as the Prius c overseas.
Hatchback		Corolla	1966	E210	2018	In about half of the world	Compact hatchback (C-segment). Successor to the Auris. Hybrid powertrain is optional.
Hatchback		GR Corolla	2022	E210	2022	Those with Gazoo Racing presence, except Europe, Singapore and Taiwan	High-performance variant of the Corolla hatchback (E210).
Hatchback		Glanza/ Starlet	2019		2022	India and Sub-Saharan Africa	Subcompact hatchback (B-segment) developed and manufactured by Suzuki, primarily marketed in India (as Glanza) and Africa (as Starlet). Rebadged Suzuki Baleno.
Hatchback		Vitz	1998 (nameplate)		2023	Sub-Saharan Africa	City car (A-segment) developed by Suzuki for almost all African markets, rebadged Suzuki Celerio.
Hatchback		Yaris (XP150)	2013	XP150	2013	Emerging markets in Asia, Africa and Latin America	Subcompact hatchback (B-segment) produced primarily for emerging markets. Hatchback version of the Vios.
Hatchback		Yaris (XP210)	1999	XP210	2020	Japan, Europe, Australasia, etc.	Subcompact hatchback (B-segment) produced primarily for developed markets. Hybrid powertrain is optional.
Hatchback		GR Yaris	2020	XP210	2020	Those with Gazoo Racing presence, except the US and Canada	High-performance, three-door version of the Yaris (XP210), mass-produced as a homologation model for the FIA World Rally Championship.
Station wagon		Corolla	1966	E210	2018	Europe, Japan and New Zealand	Station wagon version of the Corolla, primarily marketed in Europe, Japan and New Zealand. Marketed with a narrower wheelbase in Japan. Hybrid powertrain is optional.
Crossover SUV		Aygo X	2022	AB70	2022	Europe and Israel (West Asia)	Crossover city car (A-segment) designed for the European market, based on the Yaris platform. Product also sold in Israel, a West Asian country.
Crossover SUV		bZ3X	2024	EG10	2024	China	Battery electric compact crossover SUV co-developed with GAC.
Crossover SUV		bZ4X/bZ	2022	EA10	2022	In many markets worldwide	Battery electric compact crossover SUV.
Crossover SUV		bZ4X Touring/bZ Woodland	2025	EA10	2025	North America, Japan, Europe, etc.	Battery electric mid-size crossover SUV.
Crossover SUV		bZ5	2024	EA11	2024	China	Battery electric crossover SUV co-developed with BYD and FAW.
Crossover SUV		C-HR+/C-HR	2025		2025	North America, Japan, Europe, etc.	Battery electric compact crossover SUV.
Crossover SUV		C-HR	2016	AX20	2023	Europe, Australasia, etc.	Compact crossover based on the GA-C platform.
Crossover SUV		Century SUV	2023	G70	2023	Japan and China	SUV variation of the Century based on the GA-K platform. Plug-in hybrid powertrain is standard.
Crossover SUV		Corolla Cross	2020	XG10	2020	All markets except India (South Asia) and parts of Africa	Compact crossover based on the Corolla platform. Hybrid powertrain is optional.
Crossover SUV		Frontlander	2021	XG10	2021	China	Rebadged Corolla Cross for China produced by GAC Toyota.
Crossover SUV		Crown Estate/Signia	1955 (Crown nameplate)	S238	2023	North America and Japan	All-wheel-drive mid-size crossover available in hybrid powertrain, successor to the Venza in North America.
Crossover SUV		Crown Sport	1955 (Crown nameplate)	S236	2023	Japan	All-wheel-drive mid-size crossover available in hybrid and plug-in hybrid powertrains.
Crossover SUV		Grand Highlander	2023	AS10	2023	North America	Mid-size crossover primarily marketed in North America as a larger variation of the Highlander. Third-row seating is standard. Hybrid powertrain is optional.
Crossover SUV		Harrier	1997	XU80	2020	Japan	Mid-size crossover, built on the same platform as the RAV4.
Crossover SUV		Highlander/ Kluger/ Crown Kluger	2000	XU70	2019	North America, Australasia, China, Japan and the Middle East	Mid-size crossover primarily marketed in North America, Australasia and select others. Third-row seating is standard. Hybrid powertrain is optional.
Crossover SUV		Highlander BEV	2000		2026	North America	Battery electric mid-size crossover primarily marketed in North America. Third-row seating is standard.
Crossover SUV		Raize	2019	A200 (Note: Daihatsu model code)	2019	Japan, Southeast Asia, Middle East, Mexico etc.	Subcompact crossover developed by Daihatsu, primarily marketed in Japan and select others. Rebadged A200 series Daihatsu Rocky. Hybrid powertrain is optional.
Crossover SUV		RAV4	1994	XA60	2025	All markets except India (South Asia) and parts of Africa	Compact crossover marketed globally. Traditionally the best-selling Toyota SUV. Hybrid and plug-in hybrid powertrains are optional.
Crossover SUV		Wildlander	2020	XA60	2025	China	Rebadged RAV4 for China produced by GAC Toyota. Hybrid and plug-in hybrid option available.
Crossover SUV		Rush	2006	F800/ F850	2017	Southeast Asia	Rear-wheel-drive mini SUV developed by Daihatsu for the Indonesian market. Rebadged Daihatsu Terios. Primarily marketed in Southeast Asia, Middle East, and Africa. Third-row seating is standard in most markets, and optional in some markets.
Crossover SUV		Urban Cruiser / Urban Cruiser Ebella	2008 (nameplate)		2024	Europe, India, etc.	Battery electric subcompact crossover developed by Suzuki, rebadged Suzuki e Vitara.
Crossover SUV		Urban Cruiser / Urban Cruiser Hyryder	2008 (nameplate)	YM	2022	India, Middle East, Africa	Subcompact crossover developed by Suzuki, rebadged Suzuki Grand Vitara. Primarily marketed in India (as the Urban Cruiser Hyryder) and Africa. Mild hybrid and full hybrid powertrains are available.
Crossover SUV		Urban Cruiser Taisor / Starlet Cross	2008 (nameplate)		2024	India, Sub-Saharan Africa	Subcompact crossover developed by Suzuki, rebadged Suzuki Fronx. Mild hybrid powertrain is available.
Crossover SUV		Yaris Cross	2020	XP210	2020	Japan, Europe, Australasia, etc.	Subcompact crossover based on the Yaris platform, primarily marketed in Europe, Japan, and Australasia. Hybrid powertrain is optional.
Crossover SUV		Yaris Cross	2020	AC200	2023	Southeast Asia (except Singapore), Taiwan and Latin America	Subcompact crossover based on the DNGA platform, marketed in Indonesia and others. Hybrid powertrain is optional.
Body-on-frame SUV		4Runner	1984	N500	2024	Americas	Body-on-frame mid-size SUV based on the Tacoma, marketed primarily in North America. Third-row seating is optional.
Body-on-frame SUV		Fortuner/ SW4	2005	AN150/ AN160	2015	Emerging markets	Body-on-frame mid-size SUV based on the Hilux, marketed globally. Third-row seating is standard in many markets, and optional in some markets.
Body-on-frame SUV		Land Cruiser 70	1951	J70	1984	Japan, Middle East, Africa and Australasia	Full-size body-on-frame SUV. The oldest continuing Toyota nameplate. The J70 is an off-road oriented model produced with minimal changes since 1984.
Body-on-frame SUV		Land Cruiser 300	1951	J300	2021	Worldwide except Europe, North America and select other regions	Full-size body-on-frame SUV. The oldest continuing Toyota nameplate. The J70 is an off-road oriented model produced with minimal changes since 1984.
Body-on-frame SUV		Land Cruiser Prado/250	1984	J250	2023	All markets except South Korea, Brazil and some other places	Mid- or full-size body-on-frame SUV, smaller than the full-size Land Cruiser.
Body-on-frame SUV		Land Cruiser FJ	2025	J240	2025	Southeast Asia, Japan, etc.	Compact body-on-frame SUV.
Body-on-frame SUV		Sequoia	2001	XK80	2022	North America and Costa Rica	Full-size body-on-frame SUV based on the Tundra. Primarily marketed in North America. Hybrid powertrain and third-row seating are standard.
MPV/ minivan		Alphard	2002	AH40	2023	Asia	Minivans with rear sliding doors developed for the Japanese market and marketed throughout East, South and Southeast Asia. Third-row seating is standard. Hybrid powertrain is optional.
MPV/ minivan		Vellfire/ Crown Vellfire	2008	AH40	2023	Asia	Minivans with rear sliding doors developed for the Japanese market and marketed throughout East, South and Southeast Asia. Third-row seating is standard. Hybrid powertrain is optional.
MPV/ minivan		Avanza	2003	W100 (Note: Daihatsu model code)	2021	Southeast Asia and Mexico	Compact MPV developed by Daihatsu for the Indonesian market and marketed throughout emerging markets in Asia, Africa and Latin America. Third-row seating is standard in most markets, and optional in some markets. Veloz is the upmarket equivalent of the Avanza, which became its own model in 2021.
MPV/ minivan		Veloz	2021	W100/ W150 (Note: Daihatsu model code)	2021	Southeast Asia and the Middle East	Compact MPV developed by Daihatsu for the Indonesian market and marketed throughout emerging markets in Asia, Africa and Latin America. Third-row seating is standard in most markets, and optional in some markets. Veloz is the upmarket equivalent of the Avanza, which became its own model in 2021.
MPV/ minivan		Calya	2016	B400 (Note: Daihatsu model code)	2016	Indonesia	Three-row mini MPV developed by Daihatsu and marketed exclusively in the Indonesian market. Third-row seating is standard.
MPV/ minivan		HiAce Commuter/ Grandia/ Premio	2019	H300	2019	Asia-Pacific, some parts of Africa, Middle East, etc.	Passenger van version of the H300 series HiAce.
MPV/ minivan		Innova	2004	AN140	2015	Southeast Asia, India, etc.	Second-generation Innova, a rear-wheel-drive, body-on-frame mid-size MPV marketed throughout emerging markets in Asia. Third-row seating is standard.
MPV/ minivan		Innova	2004	AG10	2022	Southeast Asia, India, etc.	Third-generation Innova, a front-wheel-drive mid-size MPV, marketed as the Kijang Innova Zenix in Indonesia and as the Innova Hycross in India. Third-row seating is standard. Hybrid powertrain is optional.
MPV/ minivan		Noah	2001	R90	2022	Japan, etc.	Minivans with rear sliding doors developed for the Japanese market and also marketed in limited Asian markets. Third-row seating is standard. Hybrid powertrain is optional.
MPV/ minivan		Voxy	2001	R90	2022	Japan, etc.	Minivans with rear sliding doors developed for the Japanese market and also marketed in limited Asian markets. Third-row seating is standard. Hybrid powertrain is optional.
MPV/ minivan		ProAce Verso	2017		2017	primarily Europe but also for Israel and Turkey (both within West Asia)	Passenger van version of the ProAce. Electric powertrain is optional.
MPV/ minivan		ProAce City Verso	2019		2019	mainly Europe but also sold in Turkey and Israel (both within West Asia)	Passenger van version of the ProAce City. Electric powertrain is optional.
MPV/ minivan		Roomy	2016	M900 (Note: Daihatsu model code)	2016	Japan	Two-row mini MPV with rear sliding doors developed by Daihatsu. Marketed in Japan. Rebadged Daihatsu Thor. Also marketed under "Tank" nameplate until September 2020.
MPV/ minivan		Rumion	2021		2021	India, Africa	Three-row compact MPV developed and manufactured by Suzuki, primarily marketed in Africa. Rebadged Suzuki Ertiga.
MPV/ minivan		Sienna/Granvia	1997	XL40	2020	North America, China, etc.	Mid- and full-size minivan with rear sliding doors developed for the North American market. Third-row seating and hybrid powertrain are standard.
MPV/ minivan		Sienta	2003	XP210	2022	Japan, etc.	Mini MPV with rear sliding doors developed for the Japanese market and marketed in several Asian markets. Third-row seating is optional. Hybrid powertrain is optional.
Sports car		GR86	2012	ZN8	2021	Those with Gazoo Racing presence	Two-door, rear-wheel-drive 2+2 sports car jointly developed with Subaru alongside the near-identical Subaru BRZ. Marketed under Gazoo Racing branding since 2021.
Sports car		GR GT	2025		2025	Worldwide	Two-door, two-seater rear-wheel-drive sports car. Marketed under Gazoo Racing branding without any Toyota badges.
Kei car		COMS	2000		2012	Japan	Single-seater battery electric microcar developed by Toyota Auto Body.
Kei car		Pixis Epoch	2011	LA350 (Note: Daihatsu model code)	2017	Japan	Kei hatchback developed by Daihatsu. Rebadged LA350 series Daihatsu Mira e:S.

=== Commercial vehicles ===
Body style	Model			Current generation			Vehicle description
Body style	Image	Name(s)	Introduction (cal. year)	Model code	Introduction (cal. year)	Main markets	Vehicle description
Van		HiAce	1967	H200	2004	Japan, Southeast Asia, some parts of Africa, Middle East and others	Cab over van with rear sliding doors mainly marketed in Asia-Pacific, the Middle East and Africa. Available in many configurations, including short-wheelbase, long-wheelbase, wide super-long wheelbase, blind van, window van, low-roof, high-roof, etc. Other names include Commuter, RegiusAce, KDH, Quantum, and Ventury.
Van		HiAce	1967	H300	2019	Japan, Southeast Asia, some parts of Africa, Middle East and others	Successor to the H200 series HiAce. Passenger version is also available as the Commuter, Grandia and Premio.
Van		ProAce	2013		2016	Europe	Medium van manufactured by Stellantis, marketed in Europe. Rebadged Citroën Jumpy. Passenger-oriented version is available as the ProAce Verso. Battery electric powertrain is optional.
Van		ProAce City	2019		2019	Europe	Compact van/leisure activity van manufactured by Stellantis, marketed in Europe. Rebadged Citroën Berlingo. Passenger-oriented version is available as the ProAce City Verso. Battery electric powertrain is optional.
Van		ProAce Max	2023		2023	Europe	Large van manufactured by Stellantis, marketed in Europe. Rebadged Fiat Ducato. Battery electric powertrain is optional.
Van		Probox	2002	XP160	2002	Japan	Station wagon commercial van for the Japanese market. Successor to the Corolla/Caldina van.
Van		LiteAce	1970 (nameplate)	S400 (Note: Daihatsu model code)	2008	Japan, emerging markets in Asia and Latin America	Cab over compact van with rear sliding doors developed by Daihatsu. Rebadged Daihatsu Gran Max. Previously called the LiteAce until 2020, but the nameplate revived in 2022 for selected market.
Van		TownAce	1976	S400	2008	Japan, emerging markets in Asia and Latin America	Cab over compact van with rear sliding doors developed by Daihatsu. Rebadged Daihatsu Gran Max. Previously called the LiteAce until 2020, but the nameplate revived in 2022 for selected market.
Pickup truck		Hilux	1968	AN220	2025	Global (except North America)	Mid-size pickup truck marketed globally. Available in single cab, space cab, and double cab configurations.
Pickup truck		Hilux Champ/Stout/Rangga/Tamaraw	2023	AN110/ 120	2023	Global emerging markets	Compact pickup truck or chassis cab.
Pickup truck		Land Cruiser (J70)	1951	J70	1984	Japan, Middle East, Africa and Australasia	Pickup version of the J70 series Land Cruiser.
Pickup truck		Tacoma	1995	N400	2023	North America and others	Mid-size pickup truck developed for the North American market. Available in single cab, space cab, and double cab configurations.
Pickup truck		Tundra	2000	XK70	2021	North America and others	Full-size pickup truck developed for the North American market. Available in CrewMax, and double cab configurations. Hybrid powertrain is optional.
Pickup truck		Corolla Deck	2027 (upcoming)	XG10	–	Latin America	Compact pick up truck developed by Latin America. Based on Corolla Cross.
Pickup truck		LiteAce	1970	S400 (Note: Daihatsu model code)	2008	Japan, emerging markets in Asia and Latin America	Cab over compact basic pickup truck developed by Daihatsu. Rebadged Daihatsu Gran Max.
Pickup truck		TownAce	1976	S400	2008	Japan, emerging markets in Asia and Latin America	Cab over compact basic pickup truck developed by Daihatsu. Rebadged Daihatsu Gran Max.
Kei truck		Pixis Truck	2011	S500 (Note: Daihatsu model code)	2014	Japan	Cab over kei pickup truck developed by Daihatsu. Rebadged S500 series Daihatsu Hijet Truck.
Kei truck		Pixis Van	2011	S700 (Note: Daihatsu model code)	2021	Japan	Cab over kei van with rear sliding doors developed by Daihatsu. Rebadged Daihatsu Hijet Cargo.
Cabover truck		Dyna	1959		2011	Global	Light to medium-duty cab over truck for commercial use jointly developed with Hino.
Bus		Coaster	1969	B60/B70	2017	Global	Single-decker bus. Available in three configurations; standard wheelbase configuration, long wheelbase configuration and a school bus configuration.
Bus		Sora	2018	ZBC-MUM1NAE	2018	Japan	Fuel-cell/hydrogen single-decker transit bus, jointly developed with Hino Motors and Isuzu.
Taxi		JPN Taxi	2017	NTP10	2017	Japan, Hong Kong	Hybrid mini MPV with rear left sliding door developed for the Japanese market for taxi use. Based on the second-generation Sienta platform.

== Former production vehicles ==
Model	Introduced	Discontinued	Notes	Image
Toyota 1000	1969	1981	also sold as the Publica in Japan	
Toyota 1600GT	1967	1968	Based on the Toyota Corona RT55	
Toyota 2000GT	1967	1970		
Toyota AA/AB	1936	1943	also known as the AB for convertible version	
Toyota AC	1943	1948		
Toyota AE	1941	1943		
Toyota Allex	2001	2006	hatchback version of Corolla E120, successor of Sprinter Cielo	
Toyota Allion (E210)	2021	2025	Long-wheelbase versions of the Corolla for the Chinese market	
Toyota Altezza	1998	2005	Japanese version of the Lexus IS	
Toyota Altezza Gita	1998	2005	wagon version of Altezza	
Toyota Aristo	1991	2005	also sold as the Lexus GS	
Toyota Aurion	2006	2017		
Toyota Auris	2006	2020	also known as the Corolla hatchback between 2018 and 2020	
Toyota Avensis	1997	2018		
Toyota Aygo	2005	2021		
Toyota BA	1940	1943		
Toyota Bandeirante	1962	2001	Brazilian built Toyota Land Cruiser J40	
Toyota bB	2000	2016	sold as the Scion xB in the United States from 2003 to 2007	
Toyota Belta (2005)	2005	2016	also known as Yaris sedan or Vios in other markets	
Toyota Belta (2021)	2021	2025	rebadge Suzuki Ciaz	
Toyota Blade	2006	2012	upscale trim version of the Auris	
Toyota Blizzard	1980	1990	rebadge of Daihatsu Taft and Daihatsu Rugger	
Toyota Brevis	2001	2007		
Toyota Briska	1967	1968	pickup truck, continuation of Hino Briska, predecessor to Hilux	
Toyota C+pod	2021	2024		
Toyota Caldina	1992	2007		
Toyota Cami	1997	2005	Japanese market version of the Daihatsu Terios	
Toyota Camry Coupe	1991	1996	coupe version of the XV10 Camry	
Toyota Camry Solara	1999	2008	also known as the Solara	
Toyota Carina	1970	2000		
Toyota Carina E	1992	1998		
Toyota Carina ED	1985	1998		
Toyota Carina FF	1984	1988	FWD version sold along with the RWD Carina	
Toyota Carina Surf	1982	1992	wagon version of Carina	
Toyota Carina II	1984	1992	European version of the Corona	
Toyota Cavalier	1994	2000	in Japan, sold as the Chevrolet Cavalier 1995–2005 in the US	
Toyota Celica	1970	2006		
Toyota Celica Camry	1980	1982		
Toyota Celica Supra	1978	1986	also known as the Celica XX for the Japanese market	
Toyota Celsior	1989	2005	Japanese version of the Lexus LS	
Toyota Chaser	1977	2000		
Toyota Classic	1996			
Toyota Comfort	1995	2018	also known as the Crown Comfort, and Crown Sedan	
Toyota Copen GR Sport	2019	2026	Kei roadster developed by Daihatsu. Rebadged Daihatsu Copen GR Sport.	
Toyota Corolla Axio	2006	2025	Japanese sedan version of Corolla. Since 2018 it continued to be sold along with the Corolla (E210) until 2025	
Toyota Corolla Ceres	1992	1999	sister car of Sprinter Marino	
Toyota Corolla Fielder	2000	2025	Japanese wagon version of Corolla. Since 2018 it continued to be sold along with the Corolla (E210) until 2025	
Toyota Corolla II	1982	1999	Japanese hatchback version of Tercel	
Toyota Corolla Levin	1972	2000	sport coupe version of Corolla, sister product of Sprinter Trueno	
Toyota Corolla Rumion	2007	2015	also sold as the Scion xB from 2007 to 2016 and in Australia as the Rukus	
Toyota Corolla Spacio	1997	2007		
Toyota Corolla SR5	1983	1987	North America version of the AE86	
Toyota Corolla Verso	2001	2009		
Toyota Corona	1957	2001		
Toyota Corona EXiV	1989	1998		
Toyota Corsa	1978	1999	Sister car of the Tercel	
Toyota Cressida	1973	1992	Export version of the Mark II	
Toyota Cresta	1980	2001		
Toyota Crown Majesta	1991	2018	upscale version from the Crown	
Toyota Curren	1994	1998		
Toyota DA	1936	1940	bus	
Toyota Deliboy	1989	1995		
Toyota Duet	1997	2004	rebadged Daihatsu Storia	
Toyota Echo/Platz	2000	2005		
Toyota Esquire	2014	2021	upscale version of the third-generation the Noah	
Toyota Estima/Previa	1990	2019		
Toyota Etios	2010	2023		
Toyota FA	1954	1978		
Toyota FJ40	1960	1984		
Toyota FJ Cruiser	2006	2022		
Toyota Gaia	1998	2004		
Toyota GR Supra	1978 (as the Supra); 2019	2026	In fifth-generation, Marketed under Gazoo Racing branding	
Toyota Grand HiAce/Granvia	1999	2002	Luxury-oriented version from the regular Hiace	
Toyota Hilux Surf	1983	2009	Japanese version of the 4Runner	
Toyota Ipsum/Picnic/SportVan	1995	2009	also sold as the Picnic and the SportVan, from 2001 also sold as the Avensis Verso	
Toyota iQ	2008	2016	also sold as the Scion iQ	
Toyota Isis	2004	2017	successor of Gaia	
Toyota ist	2002	2016	also sold as the Scion xA in the United States and Toyota xA in the Middle East	
Toyota Kijang	1977	2005	known as Condor/Qualis/Revo (since 1998)/Stallion/Tamaraw/Unser (since 1998)/Zace outside Indonesia	
Toyota Lexcen	1989	1992	Australia, rebadged Holden Commodore	
Toyota Light Stout	1960	1978	also known as the Stout	
Toyota Macho	1960	1984	Venezuela-built Land Cruiser J40	
Toyota Mark II	1968	2004	also known as the Corona Mark II from 1968 to 1980	
Toyota Mark II Blit	2002	2007		
Toyota Mark II Qualis	1997	2002	upmarket version of Camry Gracia wagon	
Toyota Mark X	2004	2019		
Toyota Mark X ZiO	2007	2013	wagon version based on the Mark X	
Toyota Massy Dyna	1969	1979	four-ton cab-over truck	
Toyota Master	1955	1956		
Toyota MasterAce	1982	1991	upscale version of the TownAce	
Toyota Masterline	1955	1967	Commercial version of the Master and Crown	
Toyota Matrix	2002	2014		
Toyota Mega Cruiser	1996	2002		
Toyota MiniAce	1967	1975		
Toyota MR2	1984	2005		
Toyota MR-S	1999	2007	Japanese version of the W30 MR2	
Toyota Nadia	1998	2003		
Toyota Opa	2000	2005		
Toyota Origin	2000	2001	A retro-style car from RS series Toyopet Crown	
Toyota Paseo/Cynos	1991	1999	also known as the Cynos in the Japanese-market	
Toyota Passo	2004	2023	a rebadge of Daihatsu Boon	
Toyota Passo Sette	2008	2012	a rebadge of Daihatsu Boon Luminas	
Toyota Pixis Joy	2016	2023	a rebadge of Daihatsu Cast	
Toyota Pixis Space	2011	2017	a rebadge of Daihatsu Move Conte	
Toyota Pixis Mega	2015	2022	a rebadge of Daihatsu Wake	
Toyota Porte/Spade	2004	2020		
Toyota Premio/Allion	2001	2021		
Toyota Prius C	2011	2021	export version of the Aqua	
Toyota Prius v/+/α	2011	2021		
Toyota Progres	1998	2007		
Toyota Pronard	2002	2004	Japanese-market version of the Toyota Avalon	
Toyota Publica	1961	1978		
Toyota QuickDelivery	1982	2016		
Toyota Ractis	2005	2017		
Toyota Raum	1997	2011		
Toyota Regius	1997	2002	same as Toyota Hiace	
Toyota RH	1953	1955	also called the Super	
Toyota SA	1947	1952		
Toyota Sai	2009	2017		
Toyota SB	1947	1952	small truck	
Toyota Scepter	1991	1996	North American Camry sold in Japan	
Toyota SD	1949	1951		
Toyota Sera	1990	1995		
Toyota SF	1951	1953		
Toyota SG	1952	1954	small truck	
Toyota Soarer	1981	2005	also sold as the Lexus SC from 1991	
Toyota Soluna	1996	2003	variant of the Tercel made in Thailand and sold in Southeast Asia	
Toyota Sparky	2000	2003	a rebadge of Daihatsu Atrai 7	
Toyota Sports 800	1965	1969		
Toyota Sprinter	1968	2000	sister car of Corolla	
Toyota Sprinter Carib	1984	2002	sister car of Corolla wagon	
Toyota Sprinter Cielo	1987	1991	sister car of Toyota Corolla (E90) liftback	
Toyota Sprinter Marino	1991	1998		
Toyota Sprinter Trueno	1972	2000	sport coupe version of Sprinter, sister product of Corolla Levin	
Toyota Starlet	1973	1999	also known as the Publica Starlet in 1973 to 1978	
Toyota Stout	1954	1989	Also known as the RK in first generation	
Toyota Su-Ki	1943	1944	military vehicle built for World War II	
Toyota Succeed	2002	2020	integrated to Probox	
Toyota SunChaser	1979	1981	targa-top convertible version of the Celica built by Griffith	
Toyota T100	1993	1998	For North America market	
Toyota Tank	2016	2020	integrated to Roomy	
Toyota Tarago	1983	2019	Australia version of the Toyota TownAce/MasterAce Surf (1983–1990) and the Estima/Previa (1990–2019)	
Toyota Tercel	1978	1999		
Toyota Tiara	1960	1964	name used for the Corona RT20 sold on the export market	
Toyota ToyoAce	1954	2020	sister car from the Dyna since 1985	
Toyota Type 73	1973		used as a military transport vehicle for Japan	
Toyota Urban Cruiser (2020)	2020	2022	rebadged Suzuki Vitara Brezza	
Toyota Van/Model F/Space Cruiser/Tarago	1983	1991	export version of the Toyota TownAce/MasterAce Surf	
Toyota Venza	2008	2026		
Toyota Verossa	2001	2003		
Toyota Verso	2009	2018		
Toyota Verso-S	2010	2017	European built Ractis	
Toyota Vienta	1995	2000	luxury-oriented version of the Australian-market Camry	
Toyota Vista	1982	2003	sister models from the Japanese-market Camry	
Toyota Vitz	1999	2019	Japanese version of the Yaris	
Toyota Voltz	2002	2004	in Japan, sold as the Pontiac Vibe 2002–2009 in the US	
Toyota Windom	1989	2007	Japanese version of the Lexus ES	
Toyota WiLL Vi	2000	2005		
Toyota WiLL VS	2001	2004		
Toyota WiLL Cypha	2002	2005		
Toyota Wish	2003	2017	sold in Hong Kong and Singapore	
Toyota Yaris (DJ/DL)	2016	2020	sold in North America, also sold as the Scion iA, rebadge from the Mazda2	
Toyota Yaris Verso/FunCargo	2000	2004	European version of the FunCargo, a.k.a Echo Verso in selected markets	
Toyota Zelas	2010	2016	also sold as the Scion tC	

== Concept vehicles ==
The following is a partial list of concept cars Toyota developed. The year indicates when the vehicle was first officially shown to the public.

Toyota concept vehicles
Name	Year	Comment
Toyota 1/X	2007	
Toyota-28	2016	28 foot fibreglass boat partnered with Yanmar, entered production as the Ponam-28V
Toyota 4500GT	1989	Entered production as the Lexus SC400
Toyota 86 Shooting Brake	2016	Sports wagon based on the 86
Toyota 86 Tomica Concept	2015	Toyota 86 patrol car made to replicate a Tomica 86
Toyota A-BAT	2008	
Toyota A1	1935	Entered production as the AA
Toyota Airport Limousine (1961)	1961	Based on the Crown
Toyota Airport Limousine (1977)	1977	Based on the Crown
Toyota Alessandro Volta	2004	
Toyota APM	2020	Made specially for the 2020 Olympics
Toyota ASV	1995	Retrospectively renamed the ASV-1
Toyota ASV-2	2000	
Toyota ASV-3	2002	
Toyota Aurion Sports Concept	2006	Based on the Camry
Toyota Avalon (concept)	1991	
Toyota AXV	1985	
Toyota AXV-II	1987	Entered production as the Sera
Toyota AXV-III	1991	
Toyota AXV-IV	1991	
Toyota AXV-V	1993	
Toyota Aygo Crazy	2008	
Toyota bZ7	2024	Also shown as the Toyota bZ Satisfied Space. Entered production as the bZ7
Toyota bZ Compact SUV	2022	Entered production as the C-HR+
Toyota bZ FlexSpace	2023	Entered production as the bZ3X
Toyota bZ Large SUV	2021	Entered production as the fifth generation Highlander
Toyota bZ SDN	2021	Entered production as the bZ3
Toyota bZ Satisfied Space	2023	Also shown as the Toyota bZ7. Entered production as the bZ7
Toyota bZ Sport Crossover	2023	Entered production as the bZ5
Toyota CAL-1	1977	
Toyota Camatte	2012	Electric vehicle with customisable body panels to teach children how cars function
Toyota Camatte57s	2013	Cycle wheel roadster body for the Camatte
Toyota Camatte57s Sport	2013	Closed wheel roadster body for the Camatte
Toyota Camatte57s Sport LED	2014	Camatte57s with LEDs covering the bonnet
Toyota Camatte Daichi	2012	Closed roof off-road style body for the Camatte
Toyota Camatte Hajime	2015	Jeep style body for the Camatte
Toyota Camatte Petta	2017	Roadster body for the Camatte
Toyota Camatte Setsuna	2016	Wooden cycle wheel roadster body for the Camatte
Toyota Camatte Sora	2012	Closed roof cycle wheel style body for the Camatte
Toyota Camatte Takumi	2012	Lotus 7 style body for the Camatte
Toyota Camp Mate	1989	Expanding campervan, based on the TownAce
Toyota Camry CNG Hybrid	2008	Based on the Camry Hybrid
Toyota Camry TS-01	2005	Based on the Camry
Toyota ccX	2002	
Toyota Celica Cruising Deck	1999	Based on the seventh generation Celica
Toyota Celica Ultimate Concept	2000	Seventh generation Celica-based road racer
Toyota Celica XYR	1999	Entered production as the seventh generation Celica
Toyota Century GT45	1971	With GT45 gas turbine engine
Toyota Century Coupe	2025	
Toyota C-HR concept	2014	Entered production as the first generation C-HR
Toyota C-HR prologue	2022	Entered production as the second generation C-HR
Toyota Commuter	1970	
Toyota Coms-X	2025	
Toyota Compact Cruiser EV	2021	Entered production as the Land Cruiser FJ
Toyota Concept-i	2017	
Toyota Concept-i Ride	2017	City car optimised for drivers with wheelchairs
Toyota Concept-i Walk	2017	3-wheeled motorised scooter
Toyota Corona 1500S Convertible	1963	
Toyota Corona 1900S Sporty Sedan	1963	Entered production as the RT30L Corona
Toyota Corona Sports Coupe	1963	
Toyota Corolla Furia	2013	
Toyota Corolla	2025	
Toyota Crossover EV	2021	Entered production as the Crown Sport
Toyota Crown Convertible	1963	Based on the Crown 1900
Toyota Crown Majesta EV	1993	Based on the Crown Majesta
Toyota CQ-1	1983	Based on the TownAce
Toyota CS&S	2003	
Toyota CX-80	1979	Also shown as the FCX-80
Toyota C+pod	2019	Based on the Toyota Ultra-Compact BEV
Toyota D-4D 180 Clean Power Concept Car	2004	Demonstrated new D-4D diesel engine
Toyota Dear Qin	2012	
Toyota diji	2012	Update of the Fun-vii
Toyota DMT	2001	
Toyota Dream Car	1964	
Toyota Dream Car Model	1963	
Toyota DV-1	1981	
Toyota e-Palette	2018	Automated battery electric minibus
Toyota E-Racer	2019	Race car simulator
Toyota EA	1938	Based on the DKW F-7
Toyota EB	1938	
Toyota Electronics Car	1970	Based on the Corona
Toyota Endo	2005	
Toyota EPU	2023	4-door pickup truck
Toyota ES^{3}	2001	
Toyota ESV-2	1972	Second version
Toyota ESV	1973	Final version
Toyota EV2	1973	Small electric vehicle
Toyota EV-30	1987	
Toyota EV Prototype	2011	Based on the iQ
Toyota EX-I	1969	
Toyota EX-II	1969	
Toyota EX-III	1969	
Toyota EX-7	1970	Based on the Toyota 7
Toyota EX-11	1981	Entered production as the Soarer
Toyota Experimental Aluminum Car	1977	
Toyota Extreme Sienna	2016	Sienna with wooden floors and controlled by an iPad
Toyota F101	1973	
Toyota F110	1977	
Toyota F120	1981	
Toyota F3R	2006	
Toyota Family Wagon	1979	Based on the LiteAce
Toyota FCEV	1997	Fuel cell vehicle using methanol
Toyota Hilux FCEV concept	2023	Fuel cell vehicle based on the Hilux
Toyota FCHV	1997	Series of fuel cell hybrid vehicles based on the Highlander
Toyota FCHV-1	1997	First FCHV
Toyota FCHV-2	1999	Second FCHV
Toyota FCHV-3	2001	Third FCHV
Toyota FCHV-4	2002	Fourth FCHV
Toyota FCHV-adv	2008	Fifth FCHV
Toyota FCV	2013	Fuel cell hybrid vehicle
Toyota FCV-R	2011	Fuel cell hybrid vehicle, entered production as the Toyota Mirai
Toyota FCV Plus	2015	Fuel cell hybrid vehicle
Toyota FCX-80	1979	Also shown as the CX-80
Toyota Fine-Comfort Ride	2017	
Toyota Fine-N	2003	
Toyota Fine-S	2003	
Toyota Fine-T	2005	Called the Fine-X in America
Toyota Fine-X	2005	Called the Fine-T in Japan and Europe
Toyota FLV	1995	Also shown as the Lexus FLV
Toyota FSC	2005	Entered production as the Mark X ZiO
Toyota FT-1	2014	Provided inspiration for the Toyota Supra (J29/DB)
Toyota FT-1 Graphite Concept	2014	
Toyota FT-1 Vision Gran Turismo	2014	
Toyota FT-3e	2023	5-door SUV
Toyota FT-4X	2017	
Toyota FT-86	2009	Entered production as the 86
Toyota FT-86 G Sports	2010	
Toyota FT-86 II	2011	
Toyota FT-AC	2017	Future Toyota Adventure Concept – Hybrid Off-Roader, Entered production as the fifth generation RAV4
Toyota FT-Bh	2012	
Toyota FT-CH	2010	
Toyota FT-EV	2009	Based on the iQ
Toyota FT-Se	2023	2-door coupe
Toyota FT-EV II	2009	Based on the iQ
Toyota FT-EV III	2011	Based on the iQ
Toyota FT-HS	2007	
Toyota FT-MV	2007	Entered production as the second-generation Alphard
Toyota FT-SX	2005	Entered production as the Venza
Toyota FTX	2004	Entered production as the second generation Tundra
Toyota Fun	2017	Based on the Camry
Toyota Fun Runner	1991	Based on the 4Runner
Toyota Fun Runner II	1995	Based on the 4Runner
Toyota FunCargo	1997	
Toyota Funcoupe	1997	
Toyota Funtime	1997	
Toyota Fun-vii	2011	Updated as the diji
Toyota Furia	2013	
Toyota FX-1	1983	
Toyota FXS	2001	
Toyota FXV	1985	
Toyota FXV-II	1987	
Toyota FV	2014	
Toyota FV2	2013	
Toyota Global Hiace Bev Concept	2023	BEV Van
Toyota GR GT3	2022	Entered production as the GR GT and GR GT3
Toyota GR HV	2017	
Toyota GR Super Sport Concept	2018	
Toyota GR Supra GT4 Concept	2019	Race car based on the Supra
Toyota GR Supra Racing Concept	2018	Precursor to the Supra (J29/DB)
Toyota GRMN Sports Hybrid Concept	2010	Based on the MR2
Toyota GRMN Sports Hybrid Concept II	2011	Based on the MR2
Toyota GTV	1987	Based on the Carina
Toyota HC-CV	2009	Based on the Camry Hybrid
Toyota Hi-CT	2007	
Toyota Hilux Bruiser	2017	Looks like a Tamiya radio control car
Toyota Hilux RM-4D	1979	
Toyota HiLux RV-3	1980	Based on Hilux
Toyota HV-M4	1999	
Toyota Hybrid Electric Bus	1995	Based on the Coaster
Toyota Hybrid X	2007	
Toyota i-foot	2004	A 2-footed robot
Toyota IMV Origin	2025	
Toyota Insect	2011	1-seater concept; based on how an insect flies freely
Toyota IMV 0	2023	Also shown as the Toyota Next Generation Tamaraw Concept and the Toyota Rangga Concept. Entered production as the Toyota Hilux Champ.
Toyota i-REAL	2007	
Toyota i-Road	2013	3-wheeler
Toyota i-swing	2005	
Toyota i-TRIL	2017	
Toyota i-unit	2005	
Toyota iiMo	2012	Update of the Fun-vii / diji
Scion iQ Concept / Toyota iQ Sport	2009	Based on the iQ
Toyota JPN Taxi Concept	2013	Entered production as the JPN Taxi
Toyota JUU	2023	Motorised wheelchair
Toyota KIKAI Concept	2015	
Toyota Kayoibako	2023	EV van
Toyota Kago-Bo	2025	
Toyota Kids Mobi	2025	
Toyota Kijang Innova EV Concept	2022	Battery electric version of the Kijang Innova
Toyota Land Cruiser FJ45 Concept	2003	
Toyota Land Cruiser Se	2023	Monocoque-based three-row battery electric concept SUV
Toyota Land Hopper	2023	Electric mobility scooter
Toyota Land Speed Cruiser	2016	355 km/h (220 mph) Land Cruiser with twin turbo 5.7 litre V8
Toyota LC 500	2020	Based on the Lexus LC 500
Toyota LQ Concept	2019	
Toyota Marinetta	1971	Trailer
Toyota Marinetta 10	1973	Trailer
Toyota Marine Cruiser	1973	Based on the Land Cruiser
Toyota Matrix Sport	2002	Based on the first generation Matrix
Toyota ME.WE	2013	
Toyota MH20	1972	Motor home based on a small bus
Toyota MOB	2010	Electric open-top race car using organic materials
Toyota Moguls	1995	
Toyota Motor Triathlon Race Car	2004	
Toyota MP-1	1975	
Toyota MP20	1972	Multi-purpose vehicle based on a small bus
Toyota MR2 Concept	2020	Made in partnership with Porsche
Toyota MR2 Group B Prototype	1987	MR2 based Group B race car
Toyota MR2 Street Affair	2002	Based on the MR2
Toyota MRJ	1995	
Toyota MR-S	1997	Entered production as the third-generation MR2
Toyota Moving-E	2019	
Toyota NC250	1997	Compact luxury RWD car
Toyota NCSV	1999	
Toyota NEO Steer	2023	Used motorcycle handler bar
Toyota NEW	1997	
Toyota Next Generation Tamaraw Concept	2023	Also shown as the Toyota IMV 0 and the Toyota Rangga Concept. Entered production as the Toyota Hilux Champ.
Toyota NLSV	2003	
Toyota Noah MU Concept	2018	
Toyota NS4	2012	
Toyota Open Deck	1999	Based on the bB
Toyota Palette	1983	
Toyota Pickup EV	2021	Entered production as the fourth generation Tacoma
Toyota PieAce	2019	A convertible HiAce with built-in pie oven — an April Fools' Day joke press release by Toyota Australia
Toyota PM	2003	
Toyota Pod	2001	
Toyota Prius	1995	
Toyota Prius c Concept	2011	
Toyota Prius Custom Plus Concept	2010	
Toyota Prius G	2016	Prius modified to do 1g on a skidpad
Toyota Prius Plug-in Hybrid	2010	
Toyota Prius PHV	2011	
Toyota Prius+	2011	
Toyota Project Go	2002	
Toyota Project Portal	2017	A fuel cell truck based on the Kenworth T660
Toyota Project Portal 2.0	2018	A fuel cell truck based on the Kenworth T680
Toyota Publica Sports	1962	Entered production as the Sports 800
Toyota Rangga Concept	2023	Also shown as the Toyota IMV 0 and the Toyota Next Generation Tamaraw Concept. Entered production as the Toyota Hilux Champ.
Toyota RAV-Four	1989	Entered production as the RAV4
Toyota RAV4 Adventure	2013	RAV4 emphasising 4WD ruggedness
Toyota RAV4 Premium	2013	RAV4 emphasising luxury
Toyota Retro Cruiser	1999	Widened FJ40 body on UZJ100 chassis
Toyota Rhombus	2019	
Toyota RiN	2007	
Toyota RSC	2001	Based on the RAV4
Toyota Rugged Youth Utility	2003	Entered production as the FJ Cruiser
Toyota RV-1	1971	
Toyota RV-2	1972	
Toyota RV-5	1981	Entered production as the AL20 Tercel 4WD
Toyota S-FR	2015	
Toyota S-FR Racing Concept	2016	
Toyota Setsuna	2016	Wooden composite with open top
Toyota Soarer Aero Cabin	1987	Soarer with a retractable roof
Toyota Solara Concept	1998	Entered production as the Camry Solara
Toyota Sonic Emotion C-HR Concept	2018	Based on the C-HR
Toyota Space mobility	2023	Moon buggy
Toyota Sportivo Coupe	2004	
Toyota Sports	1957	
Toyota Sports 800 Gas Turbine Hybrid	1979	Sports 800 converted to gas turbine hybrid
Toyota Sports X	1961	
Toyota Sports EV	2010	Sports 800 converted to single electric motor
Toyota Sports EV Twin	2011	Sports 800 converted to twin electric motors
Toyota SC	1948	Based on the SB
Toyota SU-HV1	2003	Entered production as the second generation Lexus RX
Toyota Super AWD	2021	Made with Subaru, marketed as the Subaru Super AWD
Toyota Supra 4x4	2020	Rally version of the Supra
Toyota Supra Lexus	2020	Also called Toyota Supra "Lexus"
Toyota SV-1	1973	Entered production as the Celica liftback
Toyota SV-2	1981	Entered production as the Supra Mk II
Toyota SV-3	1983	Entered production as the MR2
Toyota TAC3	1983	3-seat 4WD + trailer
Toyota Tacoma Back To The Future Concept	2015	Tacoma styled in the manner of the Hilux used in the 1985 film
Toyota Tacoma X-Runner 2023 Concept	2023	Tacoma with Tundra engine, drivetrain and suspension
Toyota TE-Spyder 800	2014	Third gen MR2 spyder chassis with Prius drivetrain and 1NZ-FE engine
Toyota TES-ERA EV	2012	
Toyota Town Spider System	1973	Electric commuter
Toyota Tj Cruiser	2017	Based on the FJ Cruiser
Toyota TownAce Van EV	1991	Based on the TownAce
Toyota T Sports	2010	
Toyota U2	2014	Urban Utility vehicle
Toyota Urban Cruiser Concept	2006	Urban Cruiser Concept
Toyota Urban SUV Concept	2023	Entered production as the Urban Cruiser
Toyota UUV	2002	Urban Utility Vehicle
Toyota UUV	2015	Ultimate Urban Vehicle. Modified Sienna body on a Tacoma chassis
Toyota Vellfire Spacious Lounge Concept	2023	Based on the Toyota Vellfire
Toyota VM180	2001	
Toyota Winglet	2008	
Toyopet X	1961	Based on the RS30 Crown
uBox	2016	Electric minivan
Ultra-compact BEV Concept Model for business	2019	Based on the Toyota Ultra-Compact BEV
Toyota X-Runner	2003	Coupé utility based on the Avalon
Toyota XTREME Corolla	2016	2-door sports coupe based on a 4-door Toyota Corolla
Toyota X-Van Gear Concept	2023	Van
Toyota Yaris Adventure	2019	A Yaris subcompact pickup truck — an April Fools' Day joke press release by Toyota USA
Toyota Yaris Cabrio Concept	2000	Toyota Vitz (XP10)
Toyota Yaris Legian	2015	2-door convertible based on Toyota Yaris (XP150)
Toyota YunDong ShuangQing	2012	China-only hybrid concept

== See also ==
- List of Lexus vehicles
- List of Scion vehicles
- List of Daihatsu vehicles
- List of Toyota engines
- List of Toyota transmissions
- List of Toyota factories
- List of Toyota model codes
