= List of Scion vehicles =

Car models from Toyota

Scion, a brand of the automotive conglomerate Toyota, sold eight different small car models during its original thirteen-year existence in the North American market, which ended in 2016. All of its vehicles were mechanically related to or outright rebadgings of other cars sold under the Toyota brand. The brand was revived as Scion by Toyota in 2026.

== Current models ==
Model		Year introduced	Platform	Vehicle description
(Toyota Pixis Truck pictured)	KEI-01	2027	—N/a	Right-hand-drive low-speed vehicle kei truck, rebadged Daihatsu Hijet Truck / Toyota Pixis Truck

== Former models ==
Model	Year introduced	Year discontinued	Platform	Vehicle description
iQ	2012	2015	Toyota iQ	Front-engine, front-wheel drive three-door hatchback city car.
xA	2004	2006	Toyota NBC platform	Subcompact hatchback, rebadged Toyota Ist.
xB	2003	2015	Toyota NBC platform Toyota New MC platform	Subcompact hatchback (2003-2006), compact hatchback (2007-2015). Rebadged Toyota bB (first generation) and Toyota Corolla Rumion (second generation).
xD	2007	2014	Toyota B platform	Subcompact hatchback based on Toyota Urban Cruiser. Replaces xA
FR-S	2012	2016	—N/a	Front-engine, rear-wheel drive 2+2 sports coupe. Rebadged Toyota 86.
iA	2016	2016	Mazda DJ platform	Subcompact sedan, rebadged Mazda2.
iM	2016	2016	Toyota New MC platform	Compact hatchback, rebadged Toyota Auris.
tC	2004	2016	Toyota MC platform	Compact hatchback coupe. A rebadged version was available as the Toyota Zelas from 2011-2013.

== See also ==
- Scion, the marque under which these vehicles were sold
- compact and subcompact cars, the types of vehicles which Scion sold
- List of Toyota vehicles, for a list of vehicles sold under the Toyota brand name
