= Toyota Yaris Verso =

Toyota Yaris Verso (XP40)
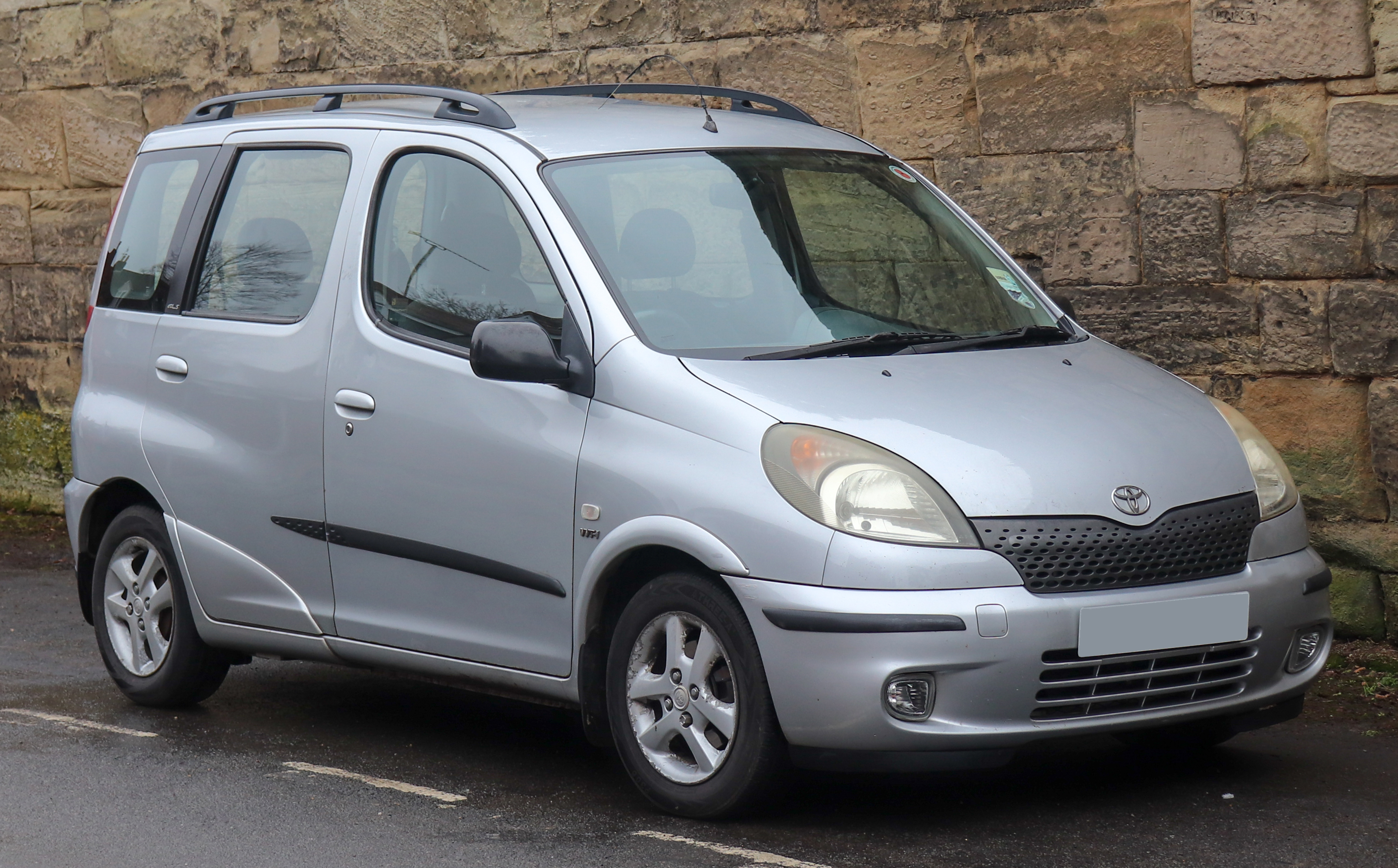
- 2001 Toyota Yaris Verso GLS (NCP20; pre-facelift, UK)

Overview
- Manufacturer: Toyota
- Also called: Toyota FunCargo (Japan); Toyota Echo Verso (Philippines and Hong Kong)
- Production: August 1999 – October 2005
- Assembly: Japan: Toyota City (Takaoka plant)
- Designer: Hirokazu Ikuma

Body and chassis
- Class: Mini MPV
- Body style: 5-door estate
- Layout: Front-engine, front-wheel-drive; Front-engine, four-wheel-drive (Japan only)
- Platform: Toyota NBC platform
- Related: Toyota Vitz/Yaris/Echo hatchback (XP10); Toyota Platz/Yaris/Echo sedan/coupe (XP10); Toyota bB/Scion xB (XP30); Toyota Ist/Scion xA (XP60)

Powertrain
- Engine: Petrol: 1.3 L 2NZ-FE VVT-i I4 (NCP20/22); 1.5 L 1NZ-FE VVT-i I4 (NCP21/25); Diesel: 1.4 L 1ND-TV D-4D direct injection turbo I4 (NLP20/22)
- Power output: 64–65 kW (86–87 hp; 87–88 PS) (2NZ-FE); 77–81 kW (103–109 hp; 105–110 PS) (1NZ-FE); 55 kW (74 hp; 75 PS) (1ND-TV)
- Transmission: 5-speed manual; 4-speed automatic

Dimensions
- Wheelbase: 2,500 mm (98.4 in)
- Length: 3,860–3,880 mm (152.0–152.8 in)
- Width: 1,660–1,665 mm (65.4–65.6 in)
- Height: 1,680–1,710 mm (66.1–67.3 in)
- Kerb weight: 1,000–1,140 kg (2,205–2,513 lb)

Chronology
- Successor: Toyota Ractis (Japan); Toyota Verso-S (Europe)

The Toyota Yaris Verso is a mini MPV produced by Toyota using the Yaris nameplate from August 1999 to October 2005. In Japan, it is known as the Toyota FunCargo (Japanese: トヨタ・ファンカーゴ, Hepburn: Toyota Fankāgo). It is built on the same NBC platform as the XP10 series Yaris/Vitz/Echo. The FunCargo/Yaris Verso was replaced in Japan and Europe by the Ractis and Verso-S, respectively.

== Overview ==
The concept form of the car was introduced in 1997 at the 32nd Tokyo Motor Show. Unlike the bB, which is also based on the Yaris, the design has a strong intonation in line with European tastes at that time. The wheelbase is 130 mm (5.1 in) longer than the Yaris.

The Yaris Verso adopted a center gauge layout on the instrument panel, and along with the Platz released at the same time, ISOFIX-compatible rear seats were standard equipment on all models from the beginning. The rear seat has an underfloor and forward storage function, making it easy to set up a large luggage compartment. It has the largest cabin volume and storage space of any compact car at the time, as things such as bicycles and large cross bikes can be stored using the standard hooks. Utilizing this volume, it has also been used for camping purposes and as a nursing and welfare vehicle that allows easy access for wheelchair users.

The car was available with 1.3- and 1.5-litre petrol engines and in 2001, a 1.4-litre D-4D diesel version was introduced. In Japan, there was also a four-wheel drive version of the 1.5-litre model (NCP25). All vehicles were equipped with a four-speed automatic transmission there. Additionally, Steer Shiftmatic was standard equipment on the G trim level. The car received the 20th 1999-2000 Japan Car of the Year along with the Vitz and the Platz.

In Japan, there were 16 colors at the beginning of the car's introduction, 18 colors for the facelift model (including the Active Two-Tone specification vehicles), and the interior color comes only in Shadow Gray and French Turquoise in the pre-facelift model and black in the facelift model.

Toyota Modellista International sold a limited edition of 350 "VF130" special edition cars.

In some markets, a two-seater van with stripped equipment was also available.

== Timeline (Japanese market) ==
The FunCargo was announced and released to the Japanese market on 30 August 1999. It was partially improved in January 2000, when rear seat headrests were made standard equipment on all models. In August the same year, Green Pearl Mica was added as a body color. ABS with EBD was made standard equipment on all models four months later. In January 2001 the "Maziora" special edition became available for the "G" and "X" models - this is a special, "polarizing" paint which changes colors depending on the angle. The Super White II body color was changed to a regular white in August.

In August 2002, the FunCargo received a facelift, receiving an altered front grille, headlights, bumpers, rear combination lamps, etcetera. The car now also met stricter emissions standards which lowered taxes somewhat. The instrument panel design and overall interior color scheme were changed. In addition, the "Pair Bench Version" and "Rear Living Version" were added to the "G" and "X" models. These models feature a more comfortable, but less flexible rear seat. In June 2003, the "HID Selection" was added to the FunCargo X. The FunCargo received another minor change in February 2004, with some models meeting tighter emissions and fuel consumption standards, making it eligible for tax breaks in the Japanese market. Production ended in September 2005. Remaining vehicle stocks remained on sale until October 2005; the de facto successor was the Toyota Ractis.

== Reception ==
Most reviews in the United Kingdom, where the car has since been replaced by the Verso-S, have praised the space and the driving characteristics whilst passing adverse comment on the car's appearance. The vehicle earned the nickname of "ice cream van" due to its boxy appearance and shape.

== Gallery ==
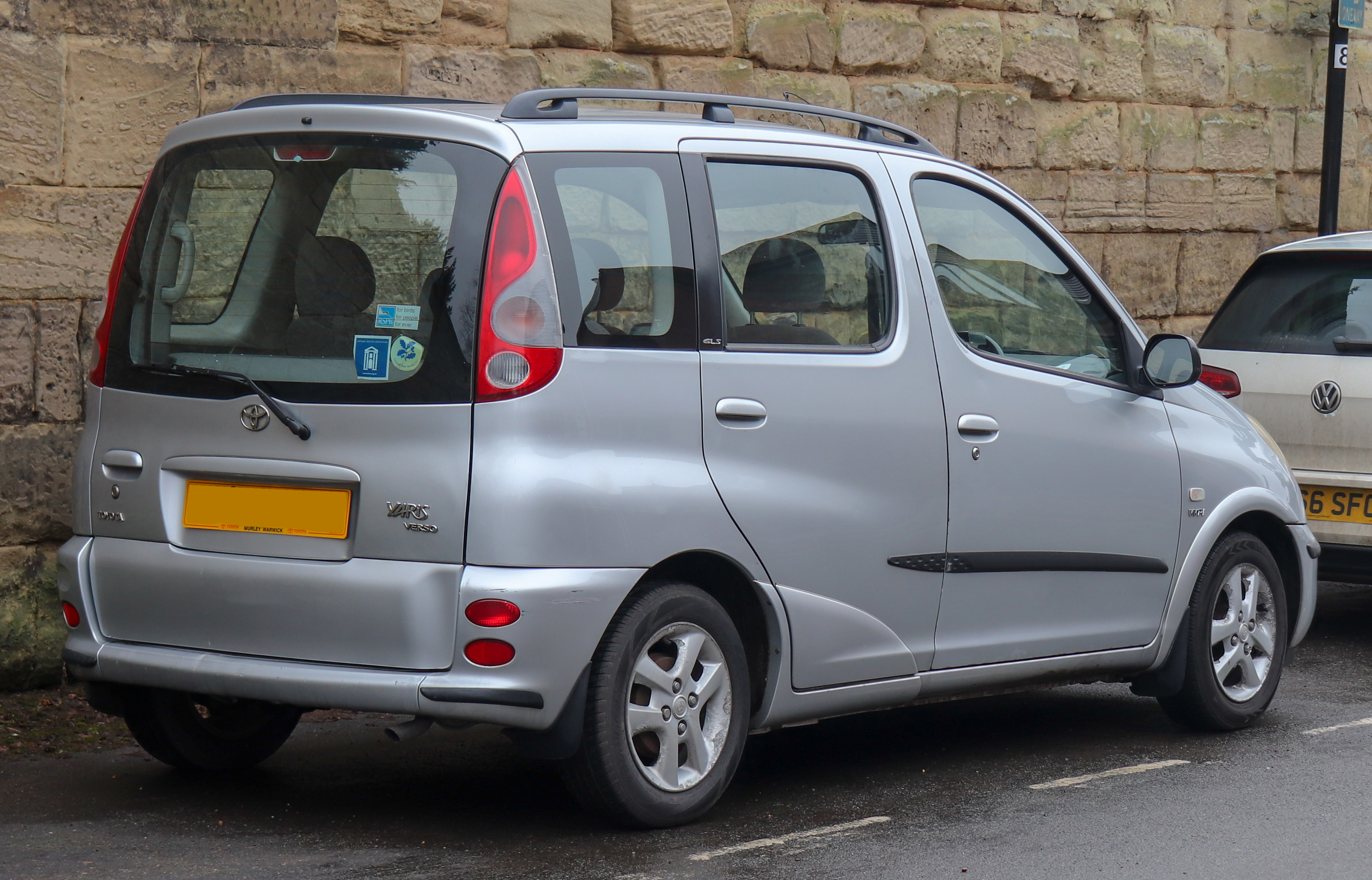
2001 Yaris Verso GLS (NCP20; pre-facelift, UK)

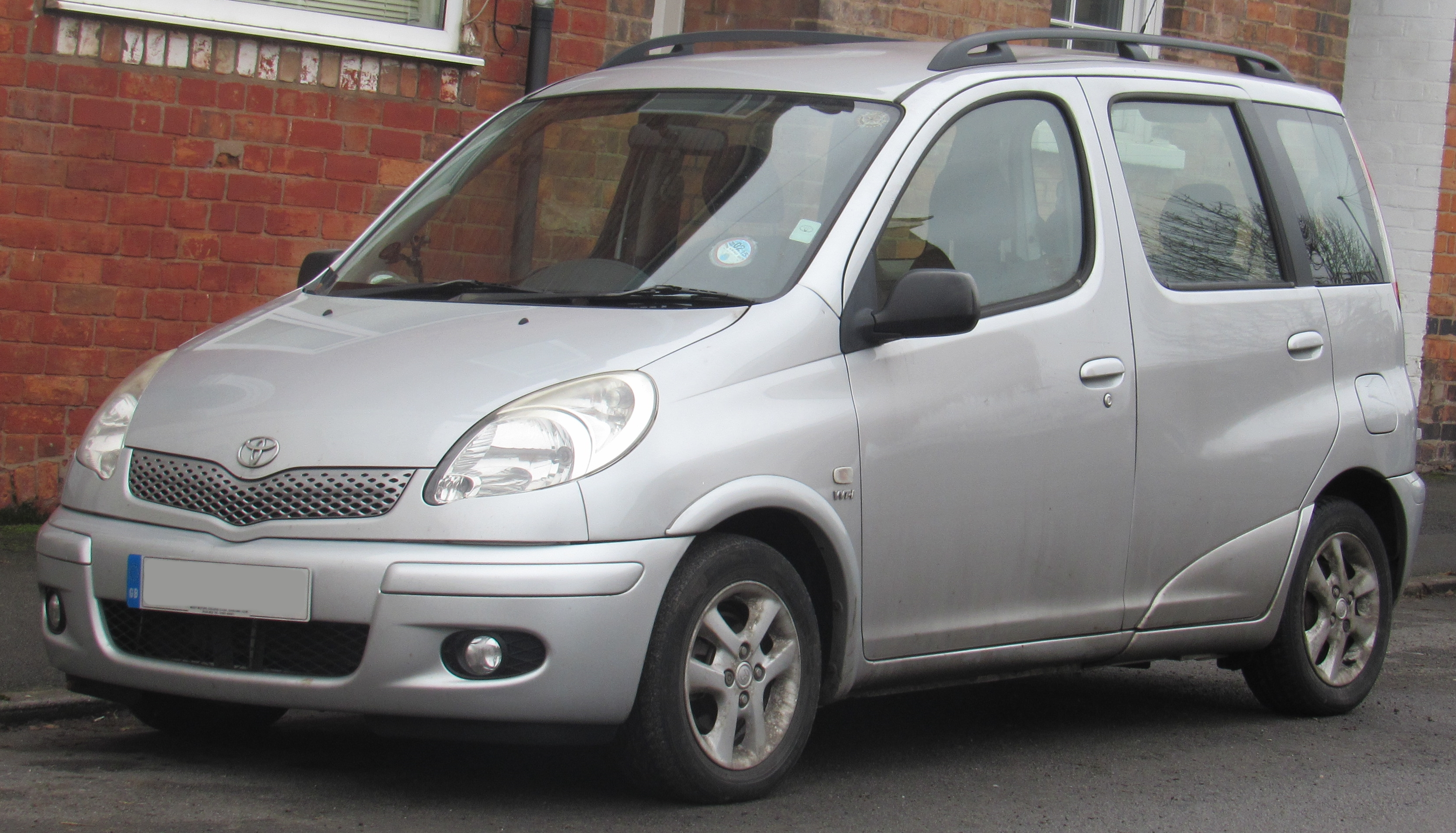
2005 Yaris Verso T Spirit (NCP20; facelift, UK)

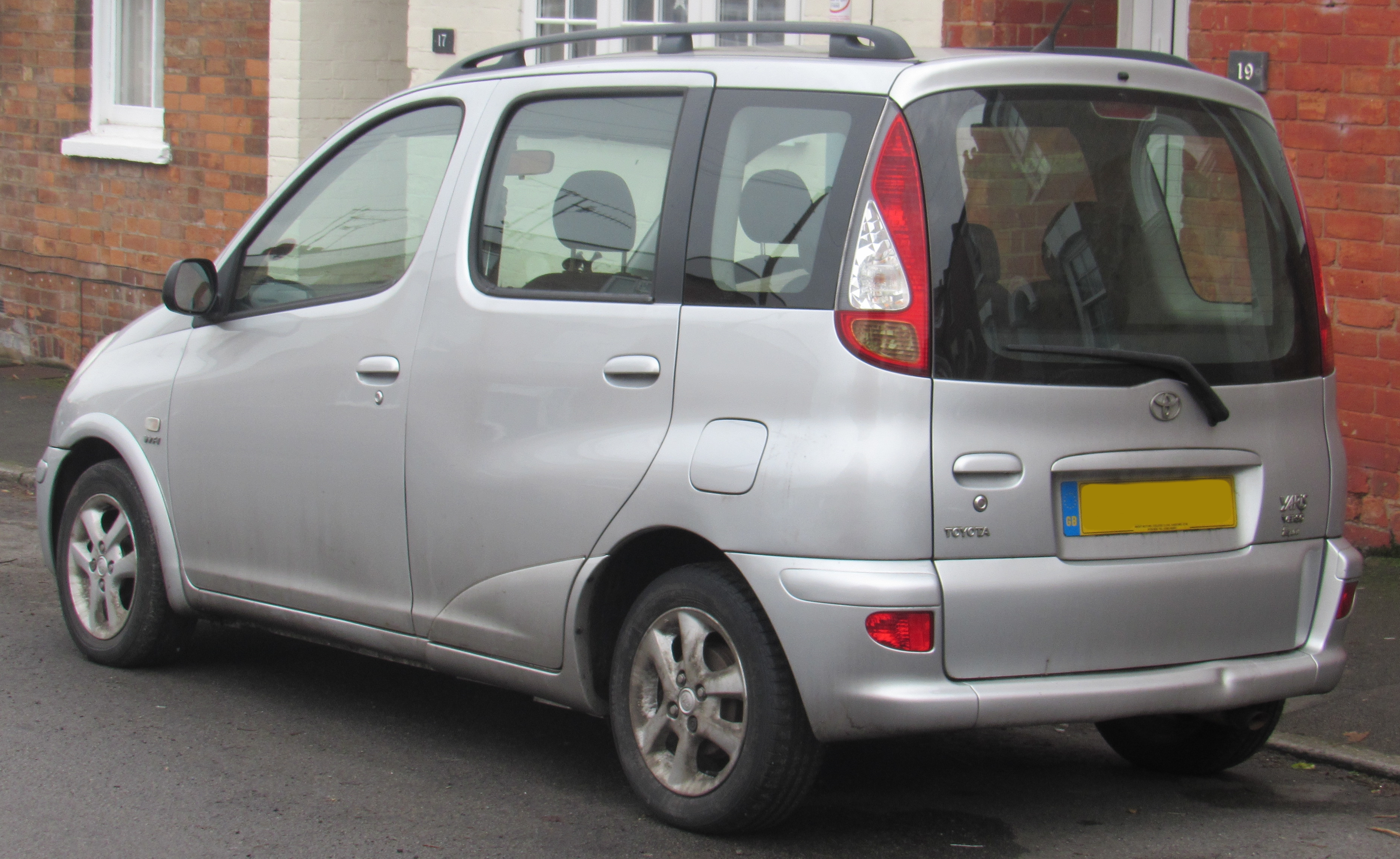
2005 Yaris Verso T Spirit (NCP20; facelift, UK)

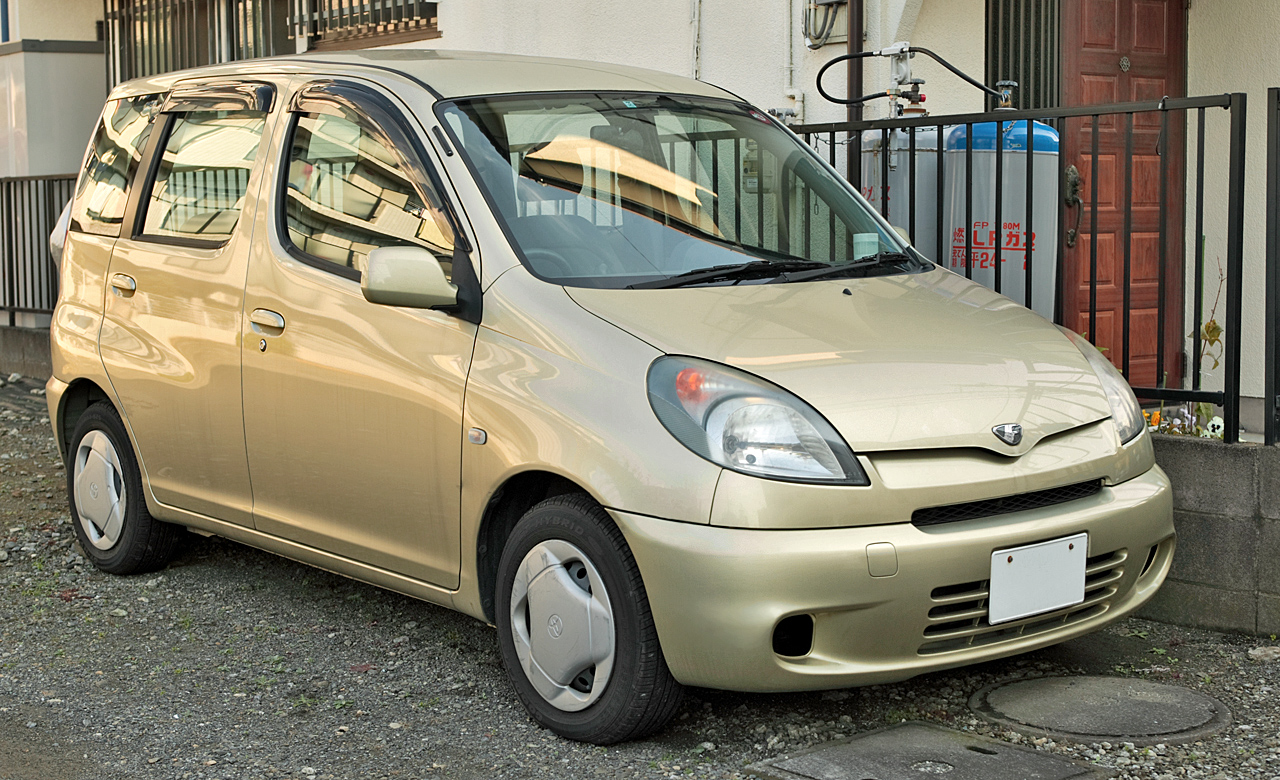
Toyota FunCargo (pre-facelift, Japan)

== See also ==
- List of Toyota vehicles
