= Toyota Carina II =

Large family car produced by Toyota (1984–1992)

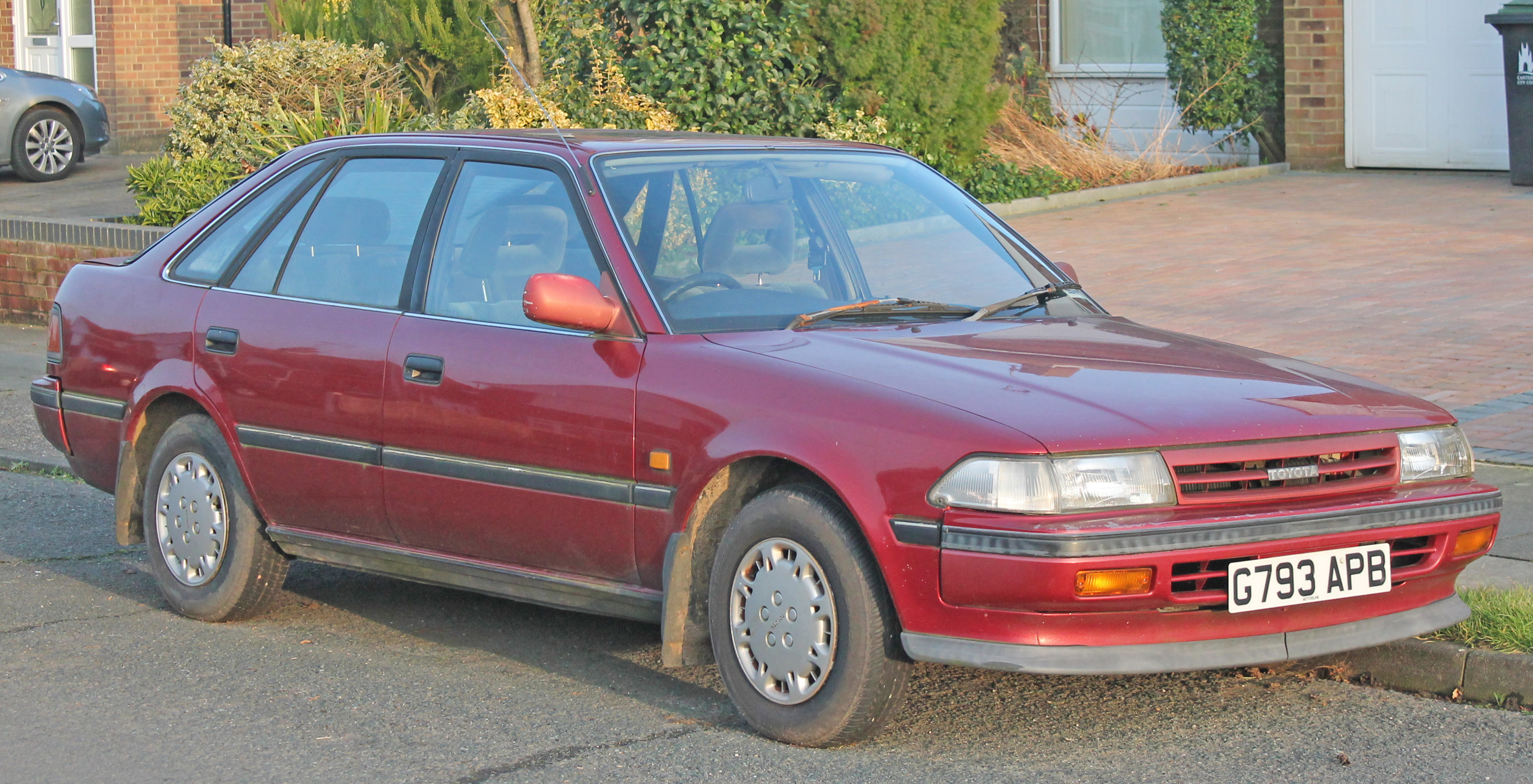

Overview
- Manufacturer: Toyota
- Production: 1984–1992

Body and chassis
- Class: Large family car
- Related: Toyota Corona

Chronology
- Predecessor: Toyota Carina A60
- Successor: Toyota Carina E

The Toyota Carina is a line of large family cars was introduced in Japan in 1970. It was introduced in Europe in 1971, with A40 and A60 series subsequently appearing soon after their introductions in Japan. In 1984, the A60 series Carina was replaced in the European market by the "Carina II" - essentially a rebranding of the T150 series Toyota Corona launched the previous year in Japan, with some minor alterations to suit the European markets. This trend of Coronas rebadged as Carinas produced for the European market continued for two more generations, with the second Carina II in 1988 and the Carina E in 1992.

== First generation (T150) ==
First generation
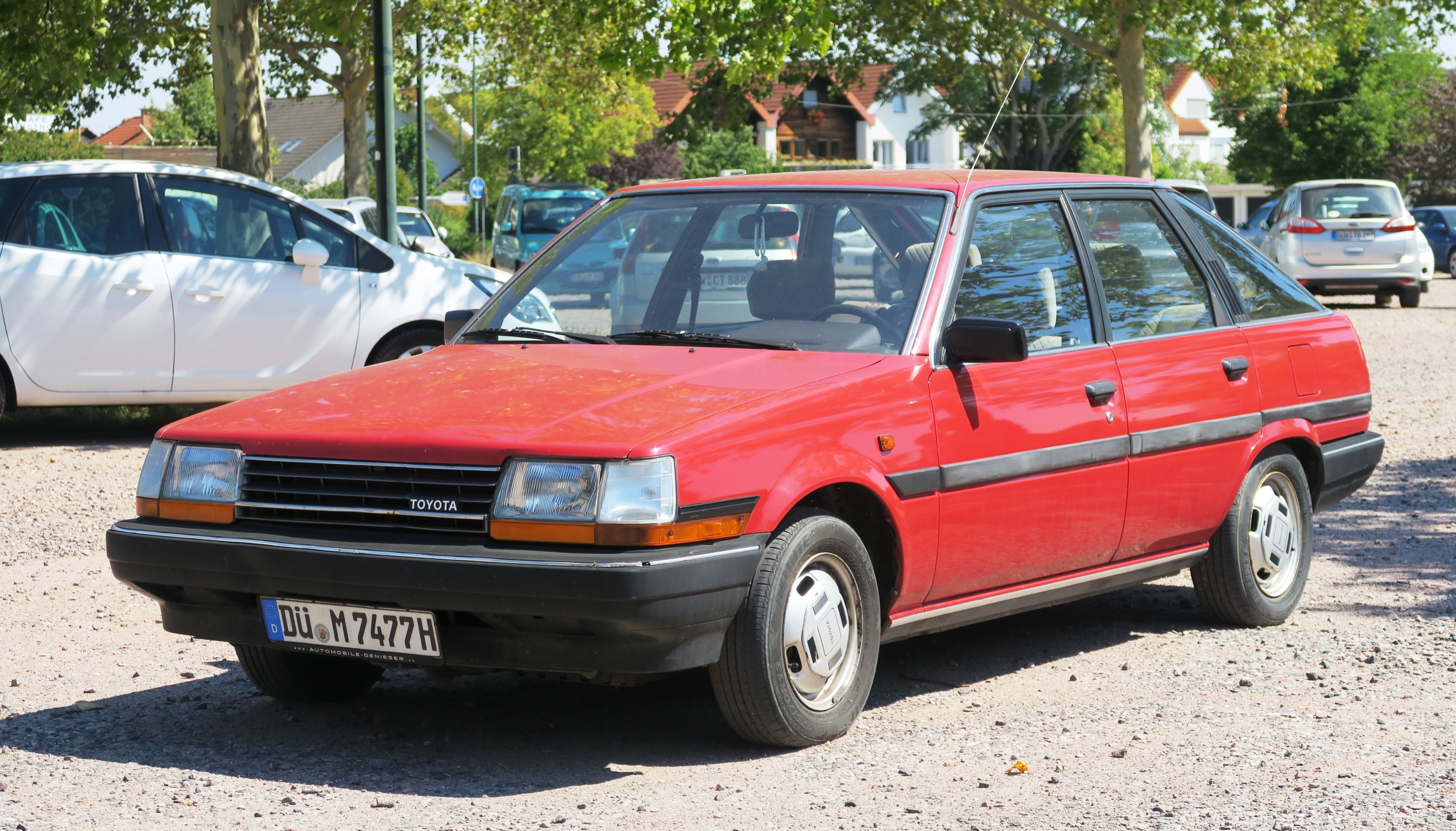
- Carina II liftback

Overview
- Model code: T150
- Also called: Toyota Corona
- Production: 1984–1988

Body and chassis
- Body style: 4-door saloon; 5-door liftback
- Platform: T150-series
- Related: Toyota Corona T150

Powertrain
- Engine: 1.6 L 4A-L I4 (AT151); 1.8 L 1S-LU/ELU I4 (ST150); 2.0 L 2S-E I4 (ST151); 2.0 L 2C diesel I4 (CT150)
- Transmission: 4/5-speed manual; 3/4-speed automatic

Dimensions
- Wheelbase: 2,515 mm (99.0 in)
- Length: 4,370 mm (172 in)
- Width: 1,670 mm (66 in)
- Height: 1,365 mm (53.7 in)
- Curb weight: 942 kg (2,077 lb)

The T150 series was originally launched in January 1983 in Japan as the Toyota Corona, which brought front-wheel drive to the model and also began the alignment of the Corona, Carina, and Celica platforms. The Carina II was presented in Europe in September 1983, going on sale in early 1984. It was introduced in the UK in April 1984. This generation was made available in sedan or liftback body styles only. It was essentially the same as the Japanese market Corona T150 with some minor cosmetic changes, namely the rear light clusters which were shortened in width to accommodate for larger European number plates. The T150 Carina introduced in Japan in May 1984, while on the same chassis, used completely different body panels featuring squarer, more aggressive styling. To further complicate matters there were also RWD models of both Carina and Corona available in the Japanese market.

There were two carburetted petrol engines (1.6 and 1.8) and one 2.0 diesel, but the 1.8 was only sold in certain markets. Equipment levels were DX and GL, although following a facelift in December 1985 which included a new grille and some minor cosmetic changes, these changed to XL and SX in some markets. The 1.6 was later offered with the option of a catalytic converter (4A-LC), dropping power to 75 PS (55 kW). In August 1985, the 107 PS (79 kW) 2.0-litre 2S-E engine was added for select markets. Along with the facelift, a fuel injected version of the 1.8 engine was added for the 1.8 GLi. In Germany, at least, this version was only sold until October 1986.

=== Trim levels ===
==== UK and Ireland ====
- 1.6 GL - 4A-L petrol engine, 83 hp (62 kW; 84 PS)
- 2.0 GLD - 2C-L diesel engine, 72 hp (54 kW; 73 PS)

==== Europe ====
- 1.6 DX/XL/GL/SX - 4A-LU/LC petrol engine, 75 to 84 PS (55 to 62 kW) at 5,600 rpm (5,400 for catalyzed version)
- 1.8 - 1S-LU petrol engine, 87 PS (64 kW) at 5,200 rpm
- 1.8 GLi - 1S-ELU petrol engine, 101 PS (74 kW)
- 2.0 - 2S-E petrol engine, 107 PS (79 kW)
- 2.0 DX - 2C-L diesel engine, 70 PS (51 kW) at 4,600 rpm
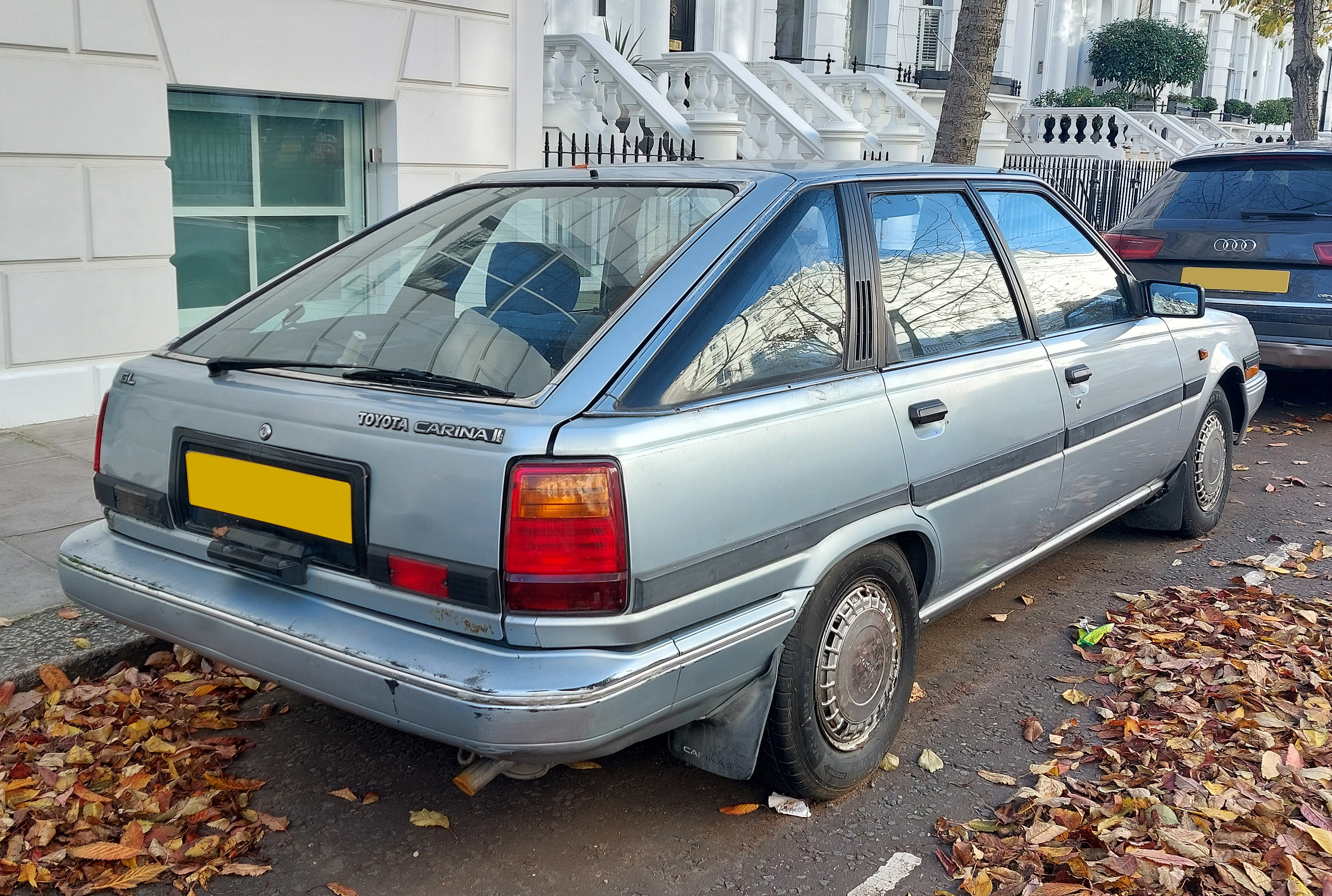
1987 Carina II GL Liftback (United Kingdom)

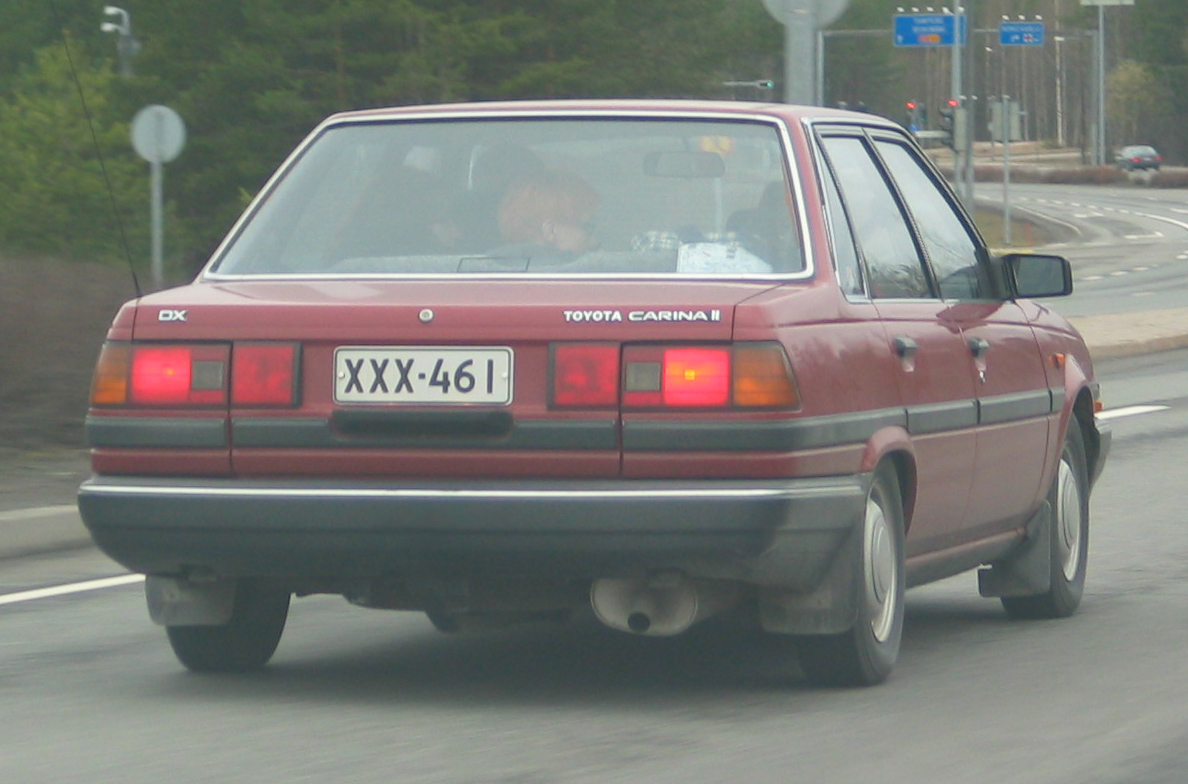
Carina II 1.6DX Sedan (Finland) rear view, showing placement of license plate

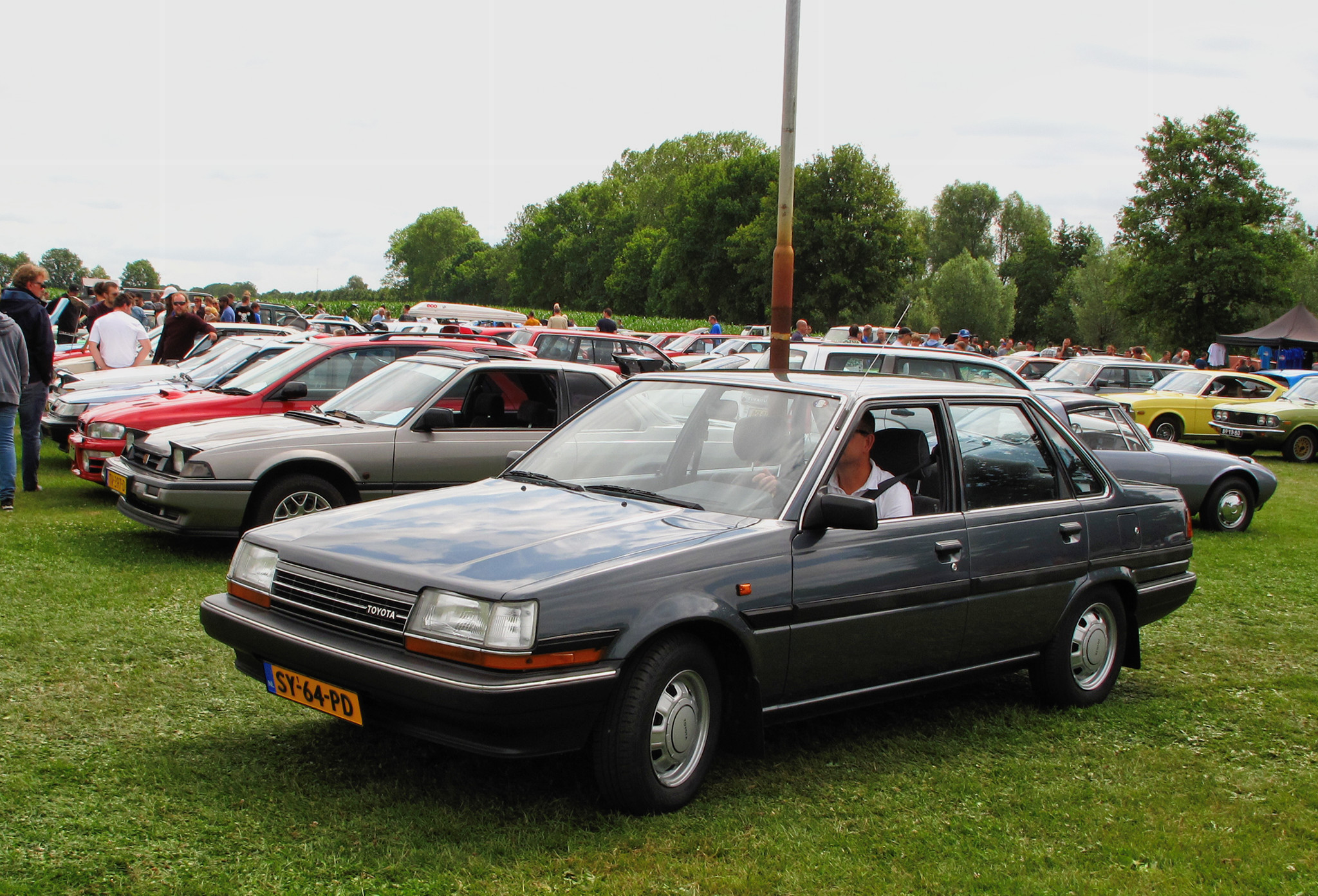
1988 Carina II 1.6DX Sedan (AT151, Netherlands)

== Second generation (T170) ==
Second generation
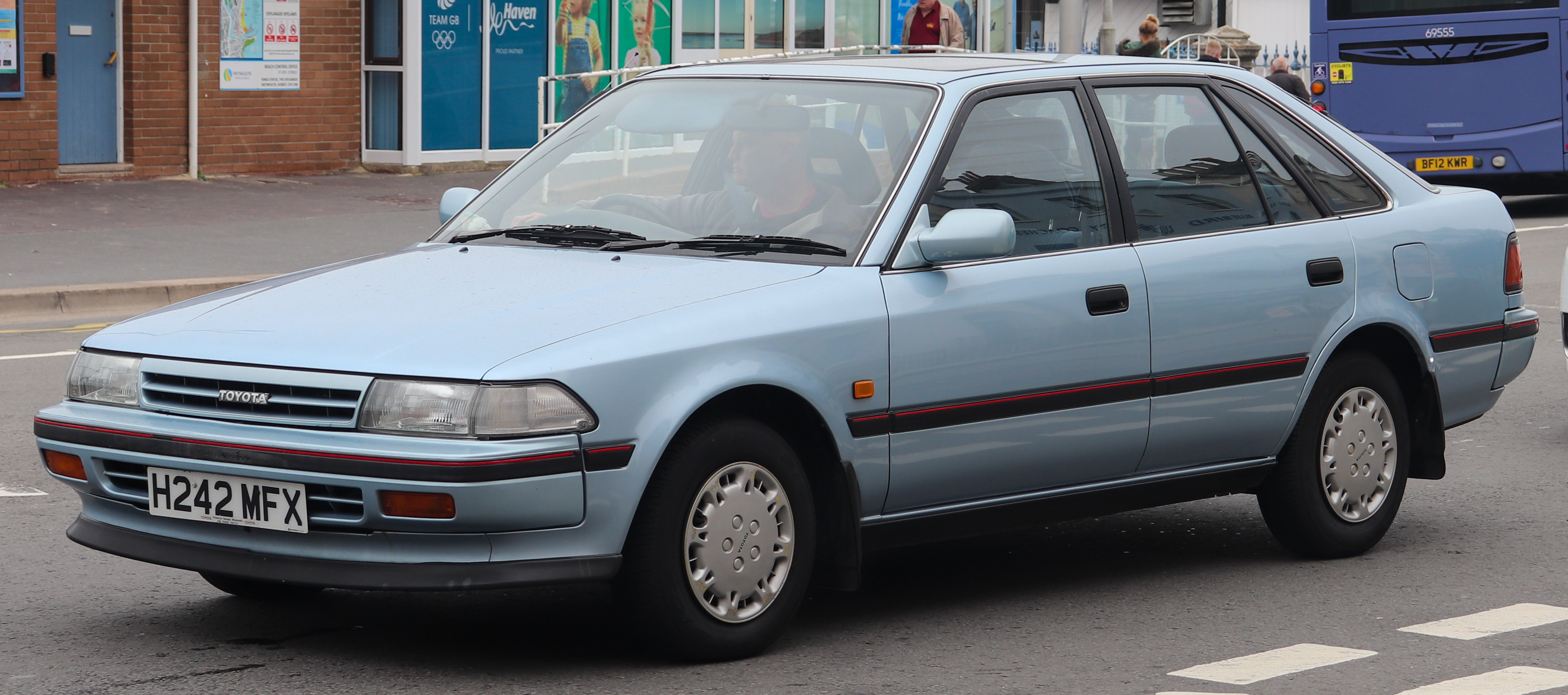
- 1991 Carina II GL 1.6 Liftback

Overview
- Model code: T170
- Also called: Toyota Corona
- Production: 1988–1992

Body and chassis
- Body style: 4-door saloon; 5-door liftback; 5-door estate
- Platform: AT171, ST170, CT170
- Related: Toyota Corona T170

Powertrain
- Engine: 1.6 L 4A-F DOHC I4 (1988-1989); 1.6 L 4A-FE DOHC I4 (1990-1992); 2.0 L 3S-FE DOHC I4; 2.0 L 2C diesel I4
- Transmission: 4/5-speed manual; 4-speed automatic

Dimensions
- Wheelbase: 2,530 mm (100 in)
- Length: 4,440 mm (175 in)
- Width: 1,690 mm (67 in)
- Height: 1,370 mm (54 in)
- Curb weight: 1,140 kg (2,510 lb)

Chronology
- Successor: Toyota Carina E

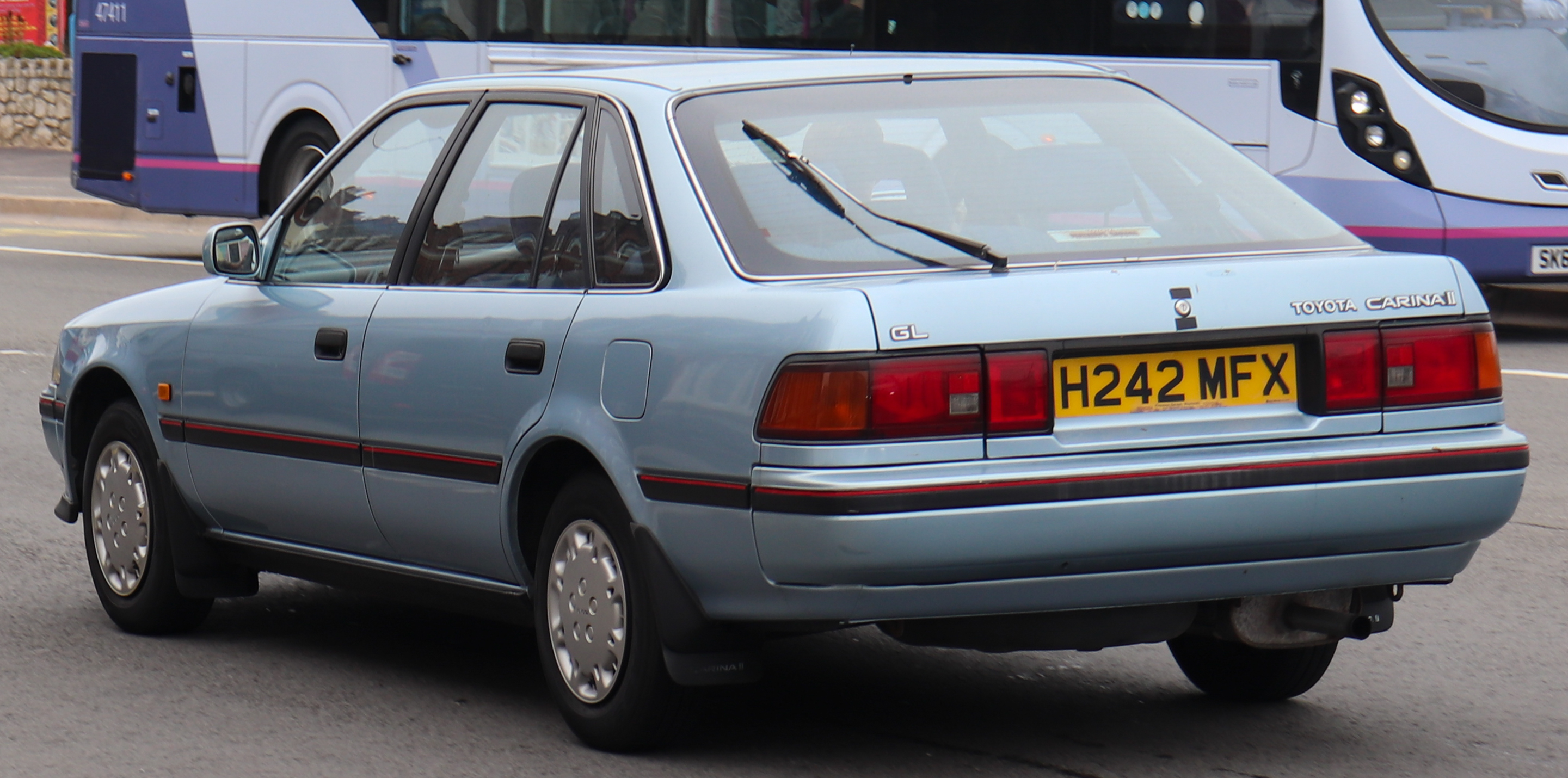
1991 Carina GL 1.6 Liftback

In 1988, the Toyota Carina II was released, based on the Japanese market T170 Corona introduced the previous year. Compared to the Corona, front and rear light clusters, front grille, and some trim are different, and the rear number plate recess was moved up from the bumper up to the boot lid. In this generation a wagon body style was also available, beside the sedan and liftbacks. The car had three engine variants, the 1,587 cc (1.6 L) 4A, 1,998 cc (2.0 L) 3S-FE petrol engines, and a 1,974 cc (2.0 L) 2C diesel engine. Petrol versions were all twin-cam, sixteen-valve inline-four cylinders.

It was well received in the United Kingdom as well as in the Nordic countries, especially Finland.

In Europe's largest national auto-market, the T170 sustained the Toyota's reputation for reliability. In 1995 it topped the family car class in a reliability survey of 4-6 year old cars undertaken by the German Automobile Association (ADAC), with 5.6 recorded breakdowns per 1,000 vehicles for four-year-old Carinas and 12.9 for six-year-old cars: this compared with 12.8 breakdowns per 1,000 cars for four-year-old Opel Vectras and 25.6 for six-year-old Vectras.

=== Trim levels ===
==== UK ====
- 1.6 GL (Mar 1988-1992) - 4A-F petrol, carbureted, uncatalyzed, 94 bhp (70 kW; 95 PS)
- 1.6 XL (Apr 1990-1992) - 4A-F petrol, carbureted, uncatalyzed, 94 bhp (70 kW; 95 PS)
- 2.0 GL Executive (Mar 1988-1992) - 3S-FE petrol, EFI, uncatalyzed, 126 bhp (94 kW; 128 PS) (saloon and hatchback only)

==== Other markets ====
- DL/DLi (1.6) - 1988-1992 (limited markets)
- XL (1.6, 2.0D) - 1988-1992 (all body types)
- XLi (1.6) - 1990-1992 (all body types)
- GL (1.6, 2.0D) - 1988-1992 (all body types)
- GLi (1.6, 2.0) - 1988-1992 (all body types)
- GLi Executive (2.0), 1988-1992 (saloon and liftback only)
- XL Highlife (1.6), 1992, special edition (saloon and liftback only)

In mainland European markets, the engines (numbers are for catalyzed versions) produced slightly different outputs from British market models. The carburetted 1.6-litre 4A-F produced 90 PS (66 kW) at 6,000 rpm, which increased to 102 PS (75 kW) at 5,800 rpm for the fuel injected 4A-FE version. The 2-litre 3S-FE, never available as an estate, produced a claimed 121 PS (89 kW) at 5,600 rpm. An uncatalysed version, available in some countries, produces 128 PS (94 kW) at the same engine speed. The 2C diesel provided 73 PS (54 kW) at 4,700 rpm and was only available with a five-speed manual transmission, whereas the petrol versions could also be had with a four-speed automatic.

In Denmark, these trims were almost identical, except that XL model was slightly more upmarket than UK cars; spec was cognate with Republic of Ireland vehicles. In certain markets, such as Sweden, the Carina II was only available with liftback bodywork and the 2.0-litre petrol engine. In Italy, the 2.0-litre Carina II's (petrol and diesel) were only available as liftbacks.

The Carina II was discontinued in 1992 and succeeded by the mostly English-built Toyota Carina E.

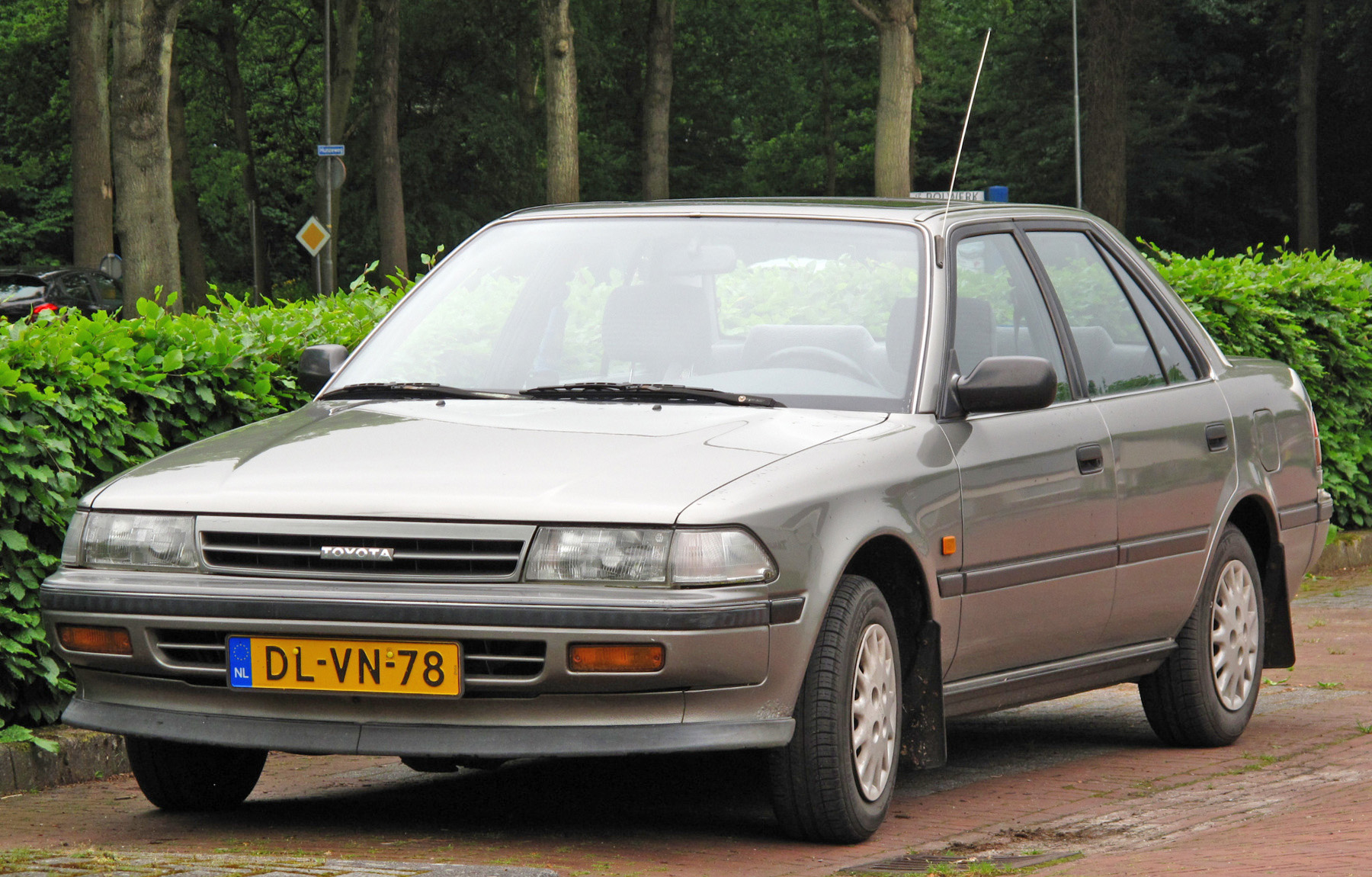
1992 Carina II 1.6 XLi saloon

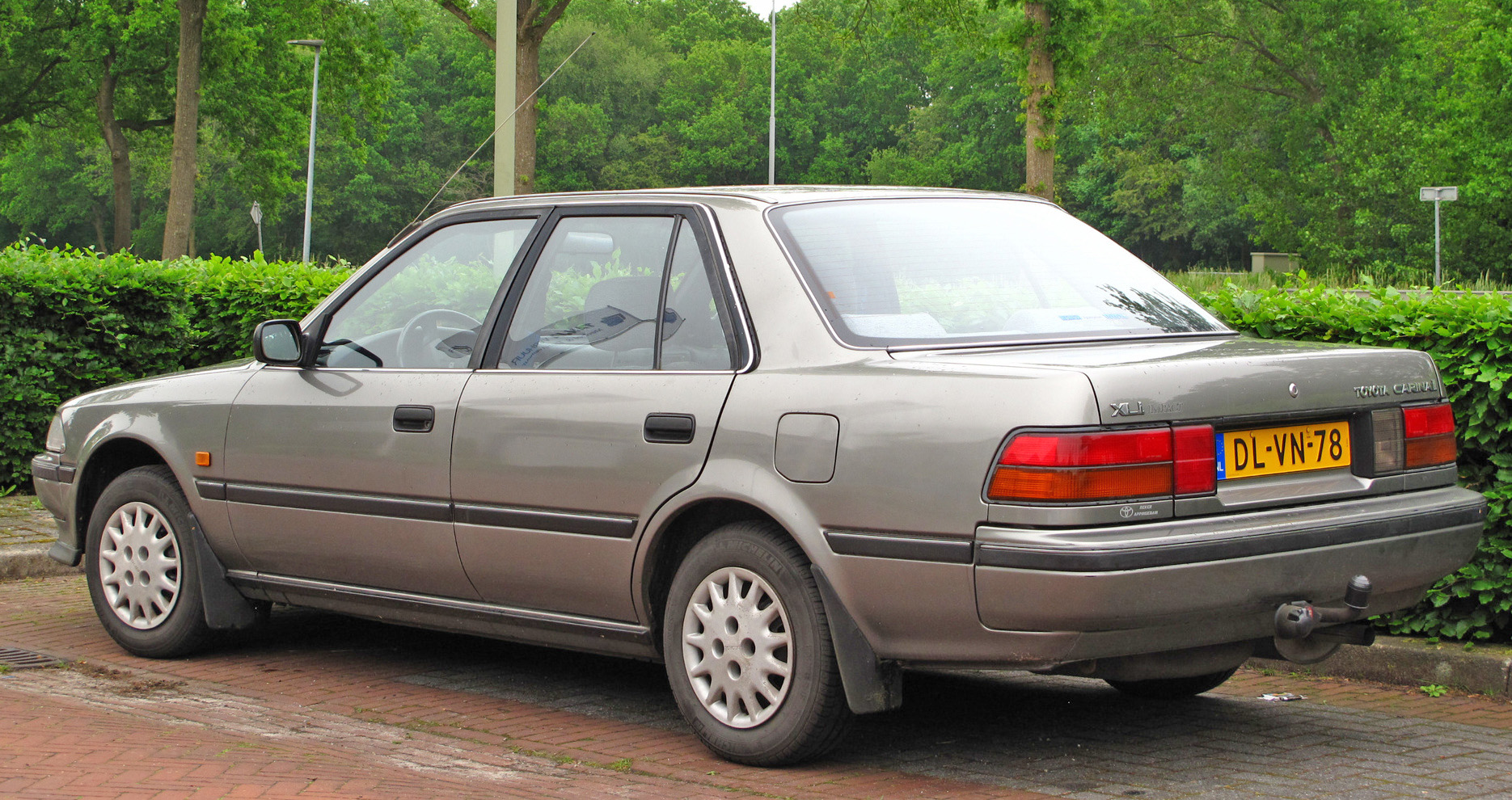
1992 Carina II 1.6 XLi saloon

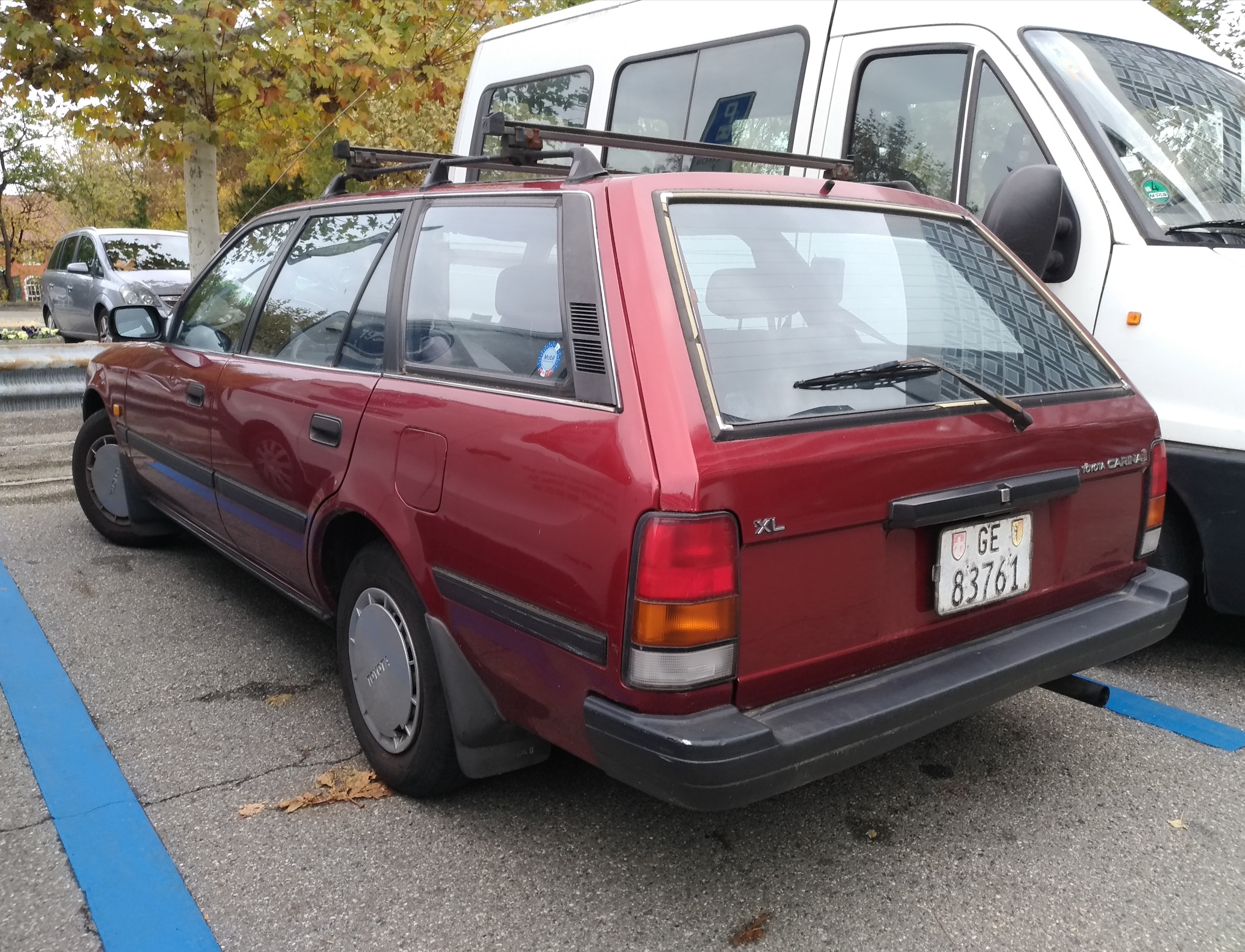
Carina II XL estate

== See also ==
- Toyota A engine
- Toyota S engine

== See also ==
- List of Toyota vehicles
