= Toyota Corolla Deck =

Brazilian compact pickup truck

Overview
- Manufacturer: Toyota
- Assembly: Brazil: Sorocaba, São Paulo (Sorocaba 2 plant)

Body and chassis
- Class: Compact pickup truck
- Body style: 4-door pickup
- Platform: TNGA: GA-C
- Related: Toyota Corolla Cross

The Toyota Corolla Deck is a compact pickup truck to be produced by the Japanese automaker Toyota from 2027. It is derived from the Corolla Cross compact SUV, it was unveiled on 18 November 2026 in Brazil. Production is scheduled to begin between April and May 2027 ahead of its market launch in May 2027.

It is positioned below the Hilux in Toyota's lineup, and marks the brand's entry into the unibody pickup segment in Brazil, and is the third model in the Corolla range to be produced in the country. Besides Brazil, it will be sold in markets across Latin America and the Caribbean.

== Design ==
It was developed under the project code 150D, the model was first seen in public as a camouflaged dual-cab prototype based on the Corolla Cross was filmed during road testing in São Paulo state in June 2026. Toyota confirmed the Corolla Deck name during its introduction on 18 November 2026. The "Deck" name refers to a flat, raised outdoor surface that extends another space, and Toyota positions the vehicle as a Corolla with a cargo bed rather than as a work vehicle.

The Corolla Deck is built on the TNGA-C (GA-C) platform, and it shares the front suspension, brakes, bonnet, A-pillars, windscreen, front wings, front doors and LED headlights with the Corolla Cross. The front end differs through a different bumper and grille with a large horizontal bar, similar to the Chinese-market facelift Frontlander.

From the B-pillars rearward, the body panels are exclusive to the Corolla Deck, with its own rear doors, a longer wheelbase, an extended rear overhang, and a cargo bed behind the dual cab. The rear uses an independent suspension in place of the torsion beam of the front-wheel-drive Corolla Cross. The XRX version shown at the launch rides on 18-inch alloy wheels with 225/55 R18 tyres and has no sunroof. Toyota confirmed a flex-fuel hybrid powertrain for the Corolla Deck.

== Production ==
The model will be produced at the Sorocaba 2 plant, which has an initial capacity of 100,000 vehicles per year and can be expanded to 200,000 per year. It will be exported to markets across Latin America and the Caribbean.
