= Toyota Stallion =

The Toyota Stallion is a nameplate used on three different pickup truck models by Toyota:

- Toyota Stallion (K40), a rebadged second-generation Toyota Stout for the South African market, 1965–1978.
- Toyota Stallion (F40), a rebadged third-generation Toyota Kijang for the South African market, 1994–2000.
- Toyota Stallion (F60), a rebadged fourth-generation Toyota Kijang for the South African market, 2000–2005.
