= Toyota Urban Cruiser =

Automotive nameplate by Toyota

The Toyota Urban Cruiser is an automobile nameplate used by the Japanese automobile manufacturer Toyota since 2008 for several subcompact SUV models:

- Toyota Urban Cruiser Concept, a concept car showcased in 2006
- Toyota Urban Cruiser (XP110), the European version of the second-generation Toyota Ist marketed between 2008 and 2014
- Toyota Urban Cruiser (2020), a rebadged Suzuki Vitara Brezza marketed in India and Africa between 2020 and 2022
- Toyota Urban Cruiser (2023), a rebadged Suzuki Grand Vitara marketed as the Urban Cruiser Hyryder in India since 2022, and as the Urban Cruiser in South Africa and the Middle East since 2023
- Toyota Urban Cruiser Taisor, a rebadged Suzuki Fronx marketed since 2024
- Toyota Urban Cruiser (BEV), a rebadged Suzuki e Vitara marketed since 2024, also known as Urban Cruiser Ebella in India
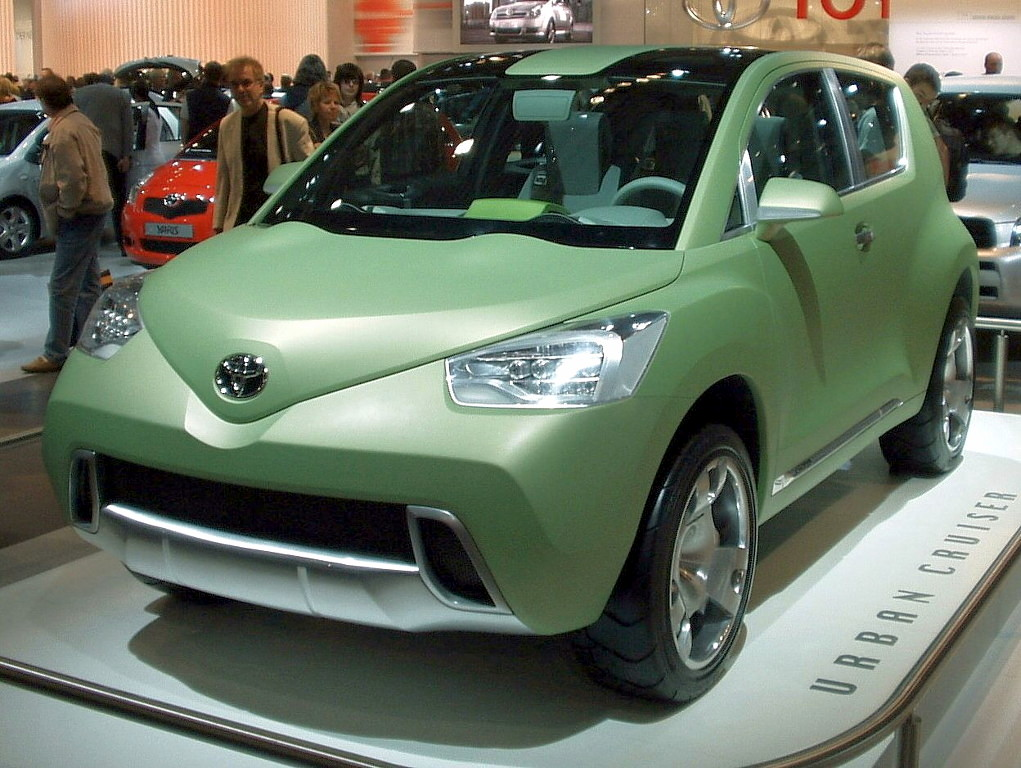
2006 Toyota Urban Cruiser (Concept)

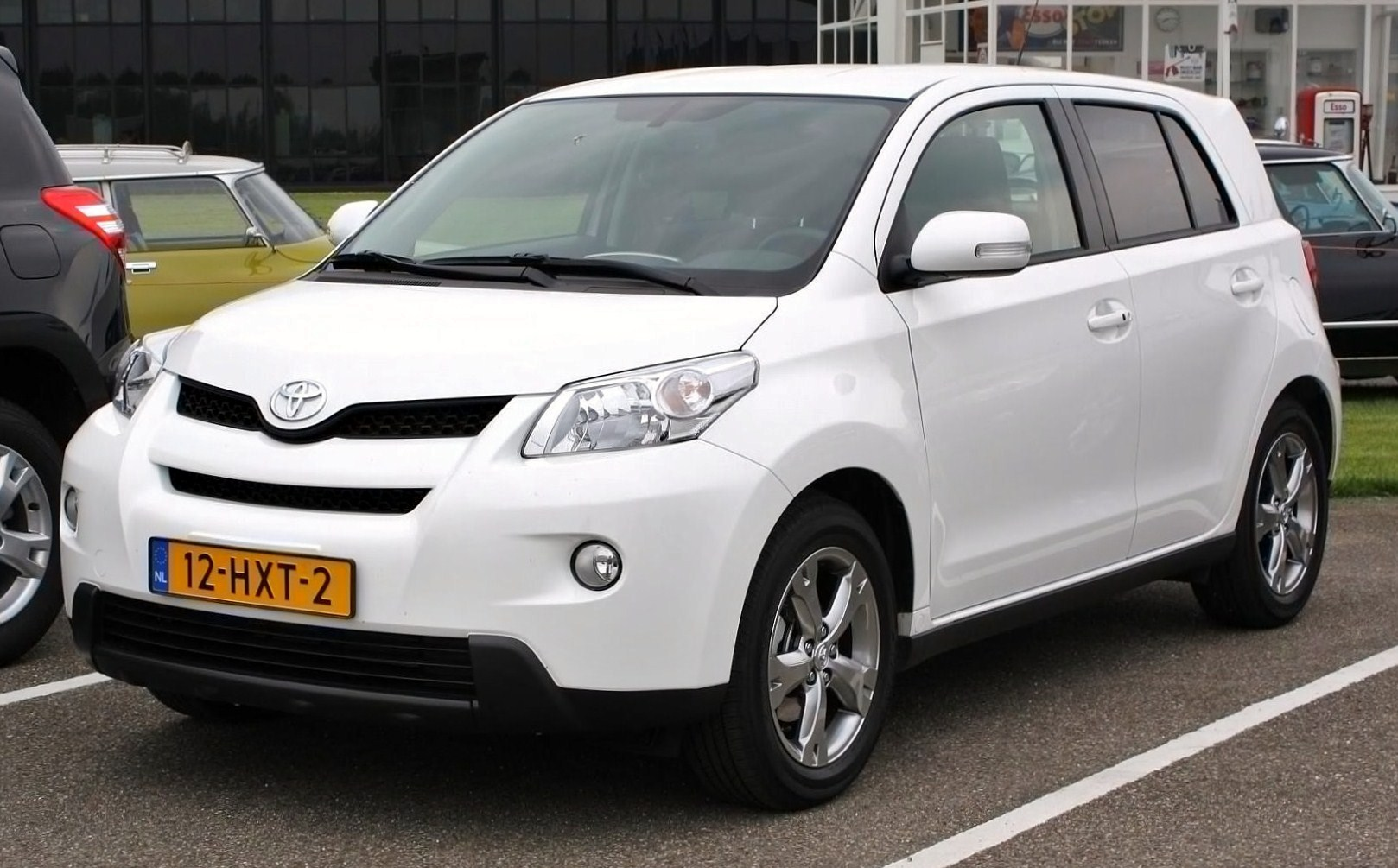
2008 Toyota Urban Cruiser (Europe)

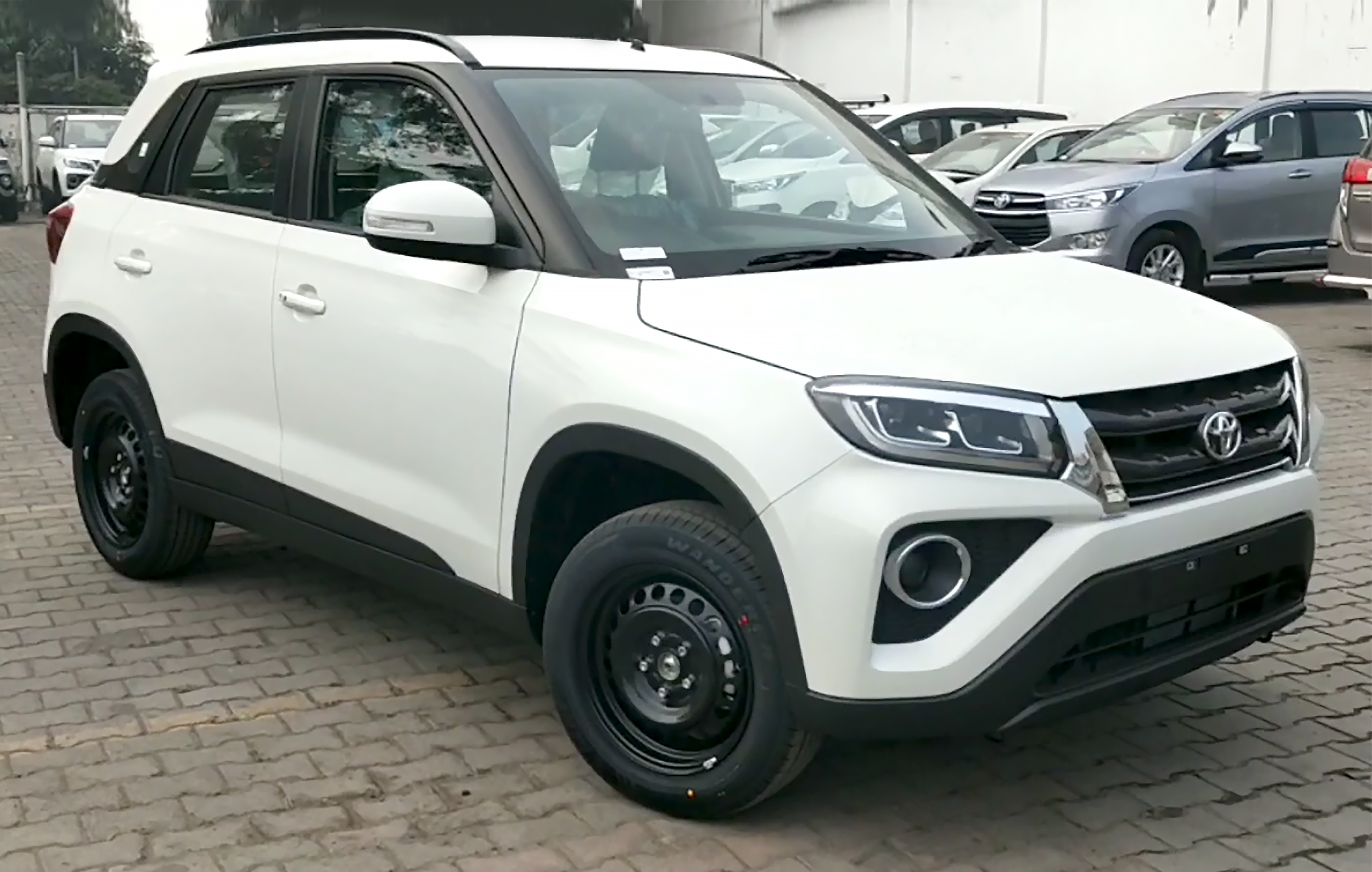
2021 Toyota Urban Cruiser (India)

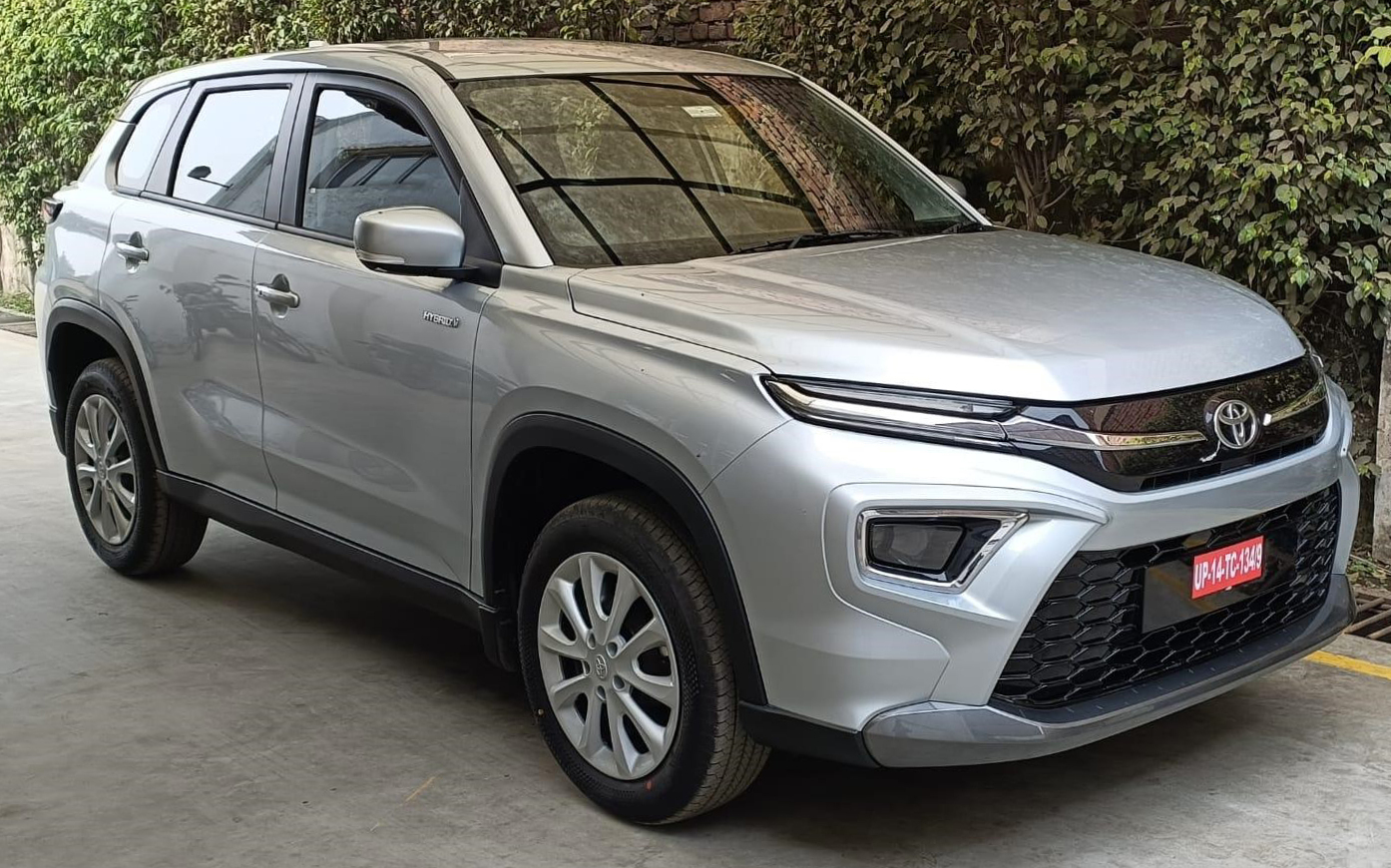
2022 Toyota Urban Cruiser Hyryder (India)

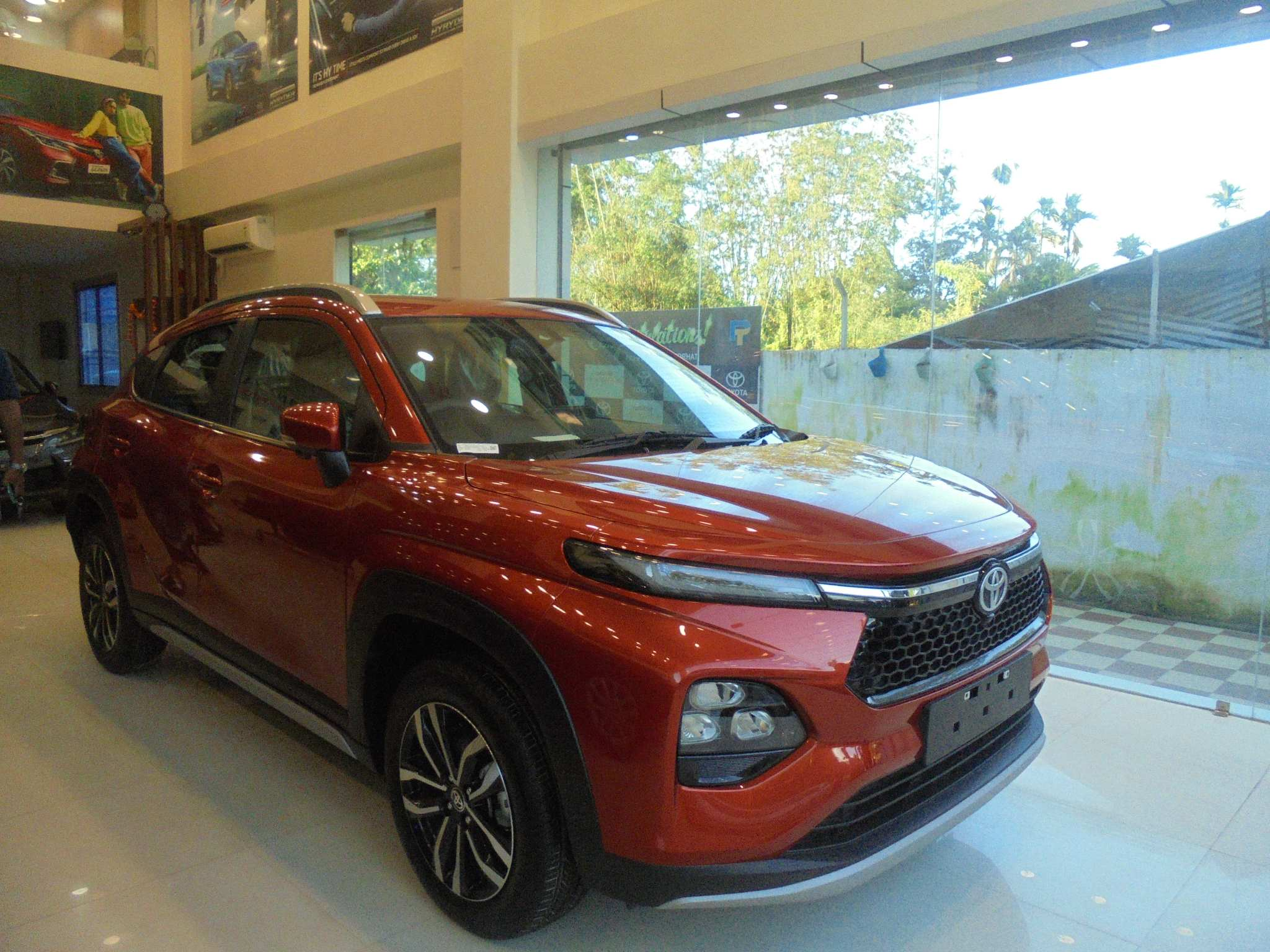
2024 Toyota Urban Cruiser Taisor (India)

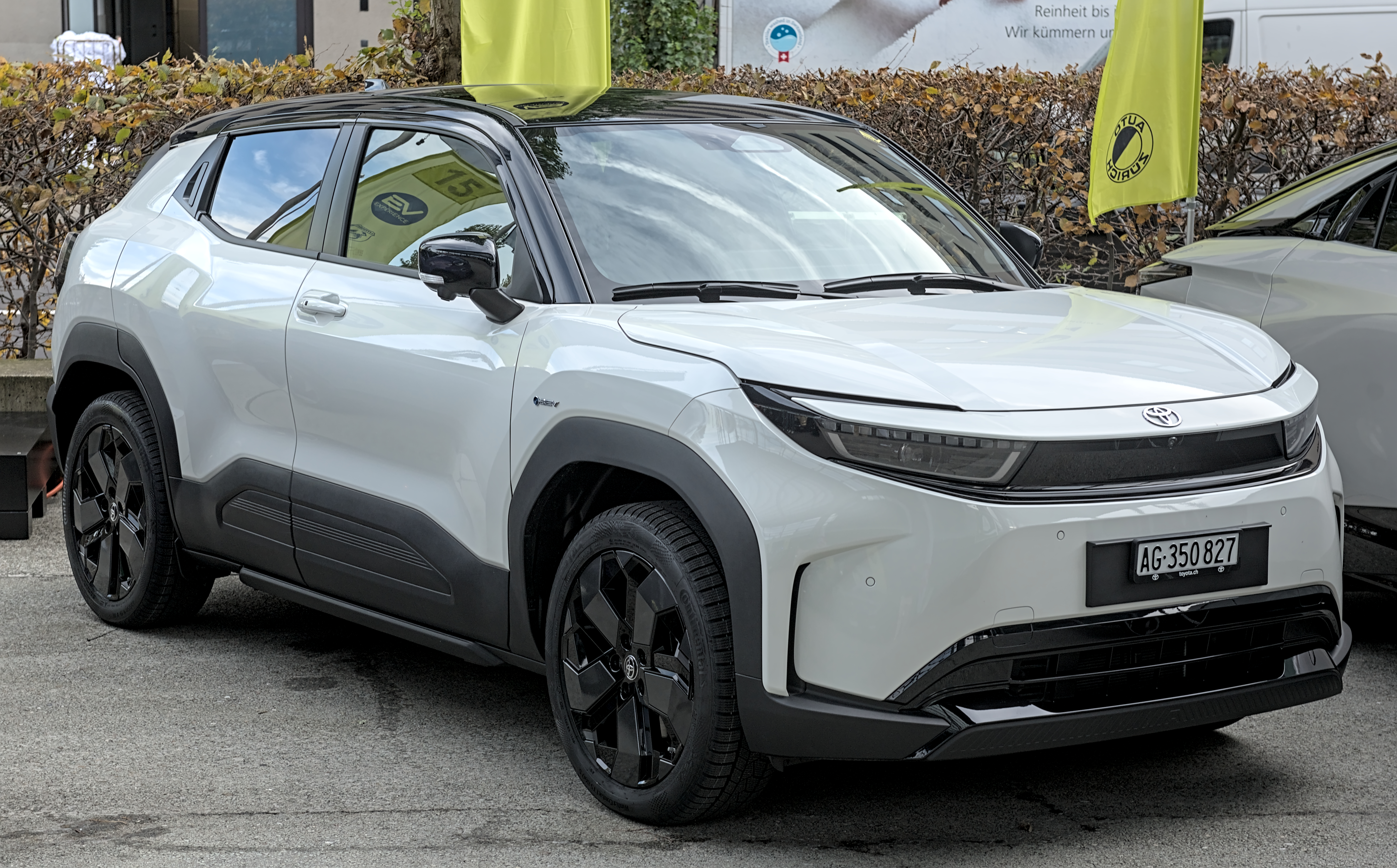
2025 Toyota Urban Cruiser BEV (Europe)
