= Toyota Ractis =

Mini MPV

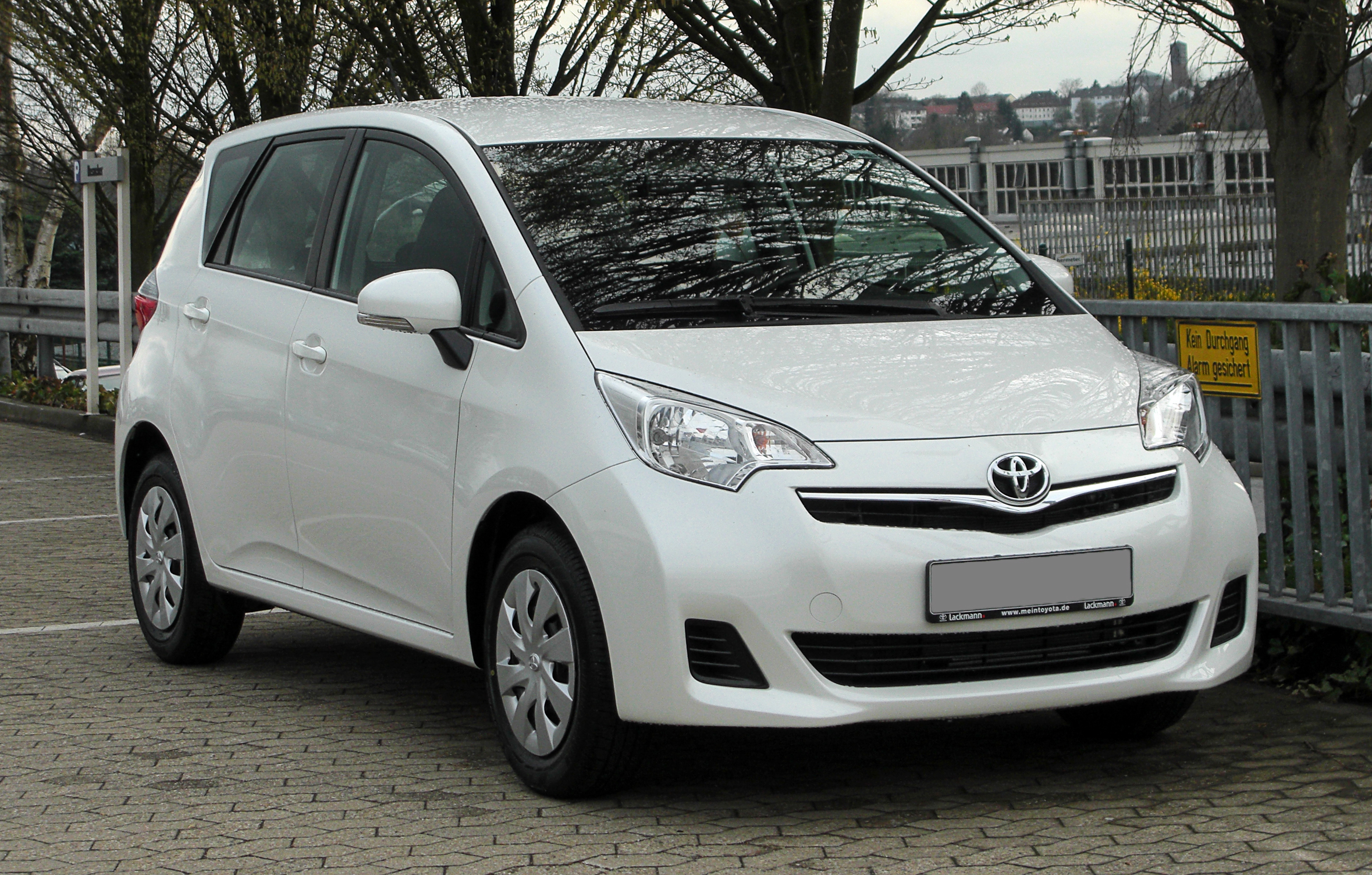
- Toyota Verso-S 1.3 Life (Germany)

Overview
- Manufacturer: Toyota
- Production: October 2005 – December 2017

Body and chassis
- Class: Mini MPV
- Body style: 5-door hatchback
- Layout: Front-engine, front-wheel-drive; Front-engine, four-wheel-drive (Japan only)
- Platform: Toyota B platform

Chronology
- Predecessor: Toyota Yaris Verso/Fun Cargo
- Successor: Toyota Tank/Roomy; Toyota Sienta (XP170)

The Toyota Ractis (Japanese: トヨタ・ラクティス, Toyota Rakutisu) is a mini MPV produced by Japanese automaker Toyota. It is a five-seater mini MPV based on the Vitz. "Ractis" is derived from "Run", "Activity" and "Space".

In New Zealand and parts of Europe it was rebadged as the Verso-S.

== First generation (XP100; 2005) ==
First generation
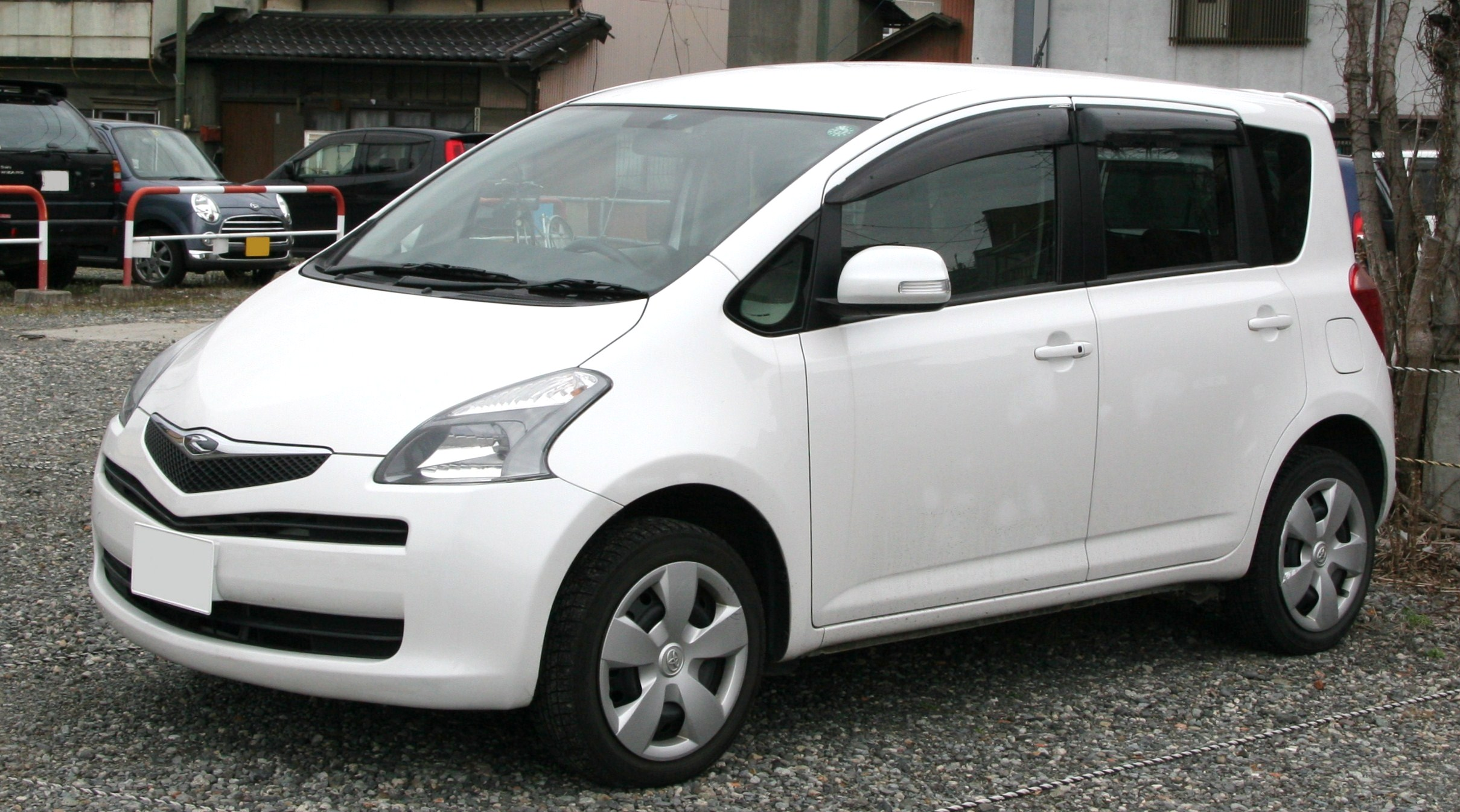
- 2005–2007 Toyota Ractis (Japan)

Overview
- Model code: XP100
- Production: October 2005 – November 2010
- Assembly: Japan: Toyota City, Aichi (Takaoka plant); Kanegasaki, Iwate (Kanto Auto Works)
- Designer: Takanori Tsubaki, Hiroaki Hakamata and Takahiro Minami (2003); Masatoshi Watanabe and Hiroaki Suzuki (2007 minor change: 2006)

Body and chassis
- Related: Toyota Vitz/Yaris (XP90); Toyota Belta/Vios (XP90); Toyota ist (XP110)

Powertrain
- Engine: 1.3 L 2SZ-FE I4 (petrol); 1.5 L 1NZ-FE I4 (petrol)
- Transmission: 4-speed automatic (AWD); CVT (FF)

Dimensions
- Wheelbase: 2,550 mm (100.4 in)
- Length: 3,955 mm (155.7 in)
- Width: 1,695 mm (66.7 in)
- Height: 1,640–1,660 mm (64.6–65.4 in)
- Curb weight: 1,120–1,210 kg (2,469–2,668 lb)

The first generation Ractis was initially only sold in Japan, and was available at Toyopet Store dealerships. A minor change was released on December 20, 2007, with new headlights and tail lights. Sales in Hong Kong started from October 2009. Available in both 1.3-litre and 1.5-litre engines.

This Mini-MPV features a CVT-i (Continuously Variable Transmission-intelligent) transmission that's more fuel efficient, more comfortable and assures a smoother driving experience. It also features electronic controls which simulate fixed gear ratios while accelerating.

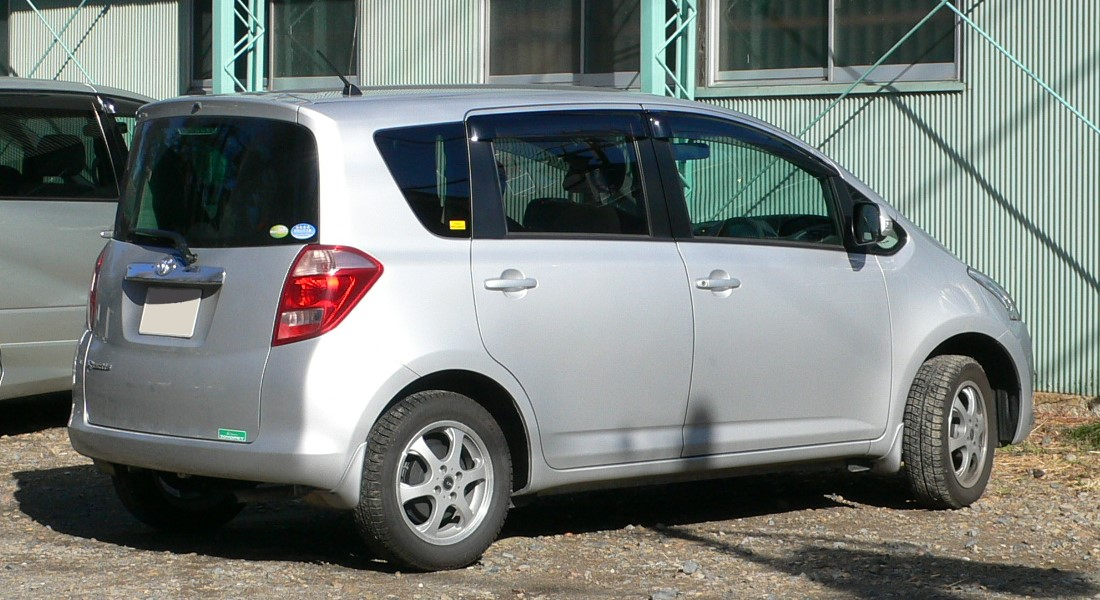
2005–2007 Toyota Ractis (Japan)

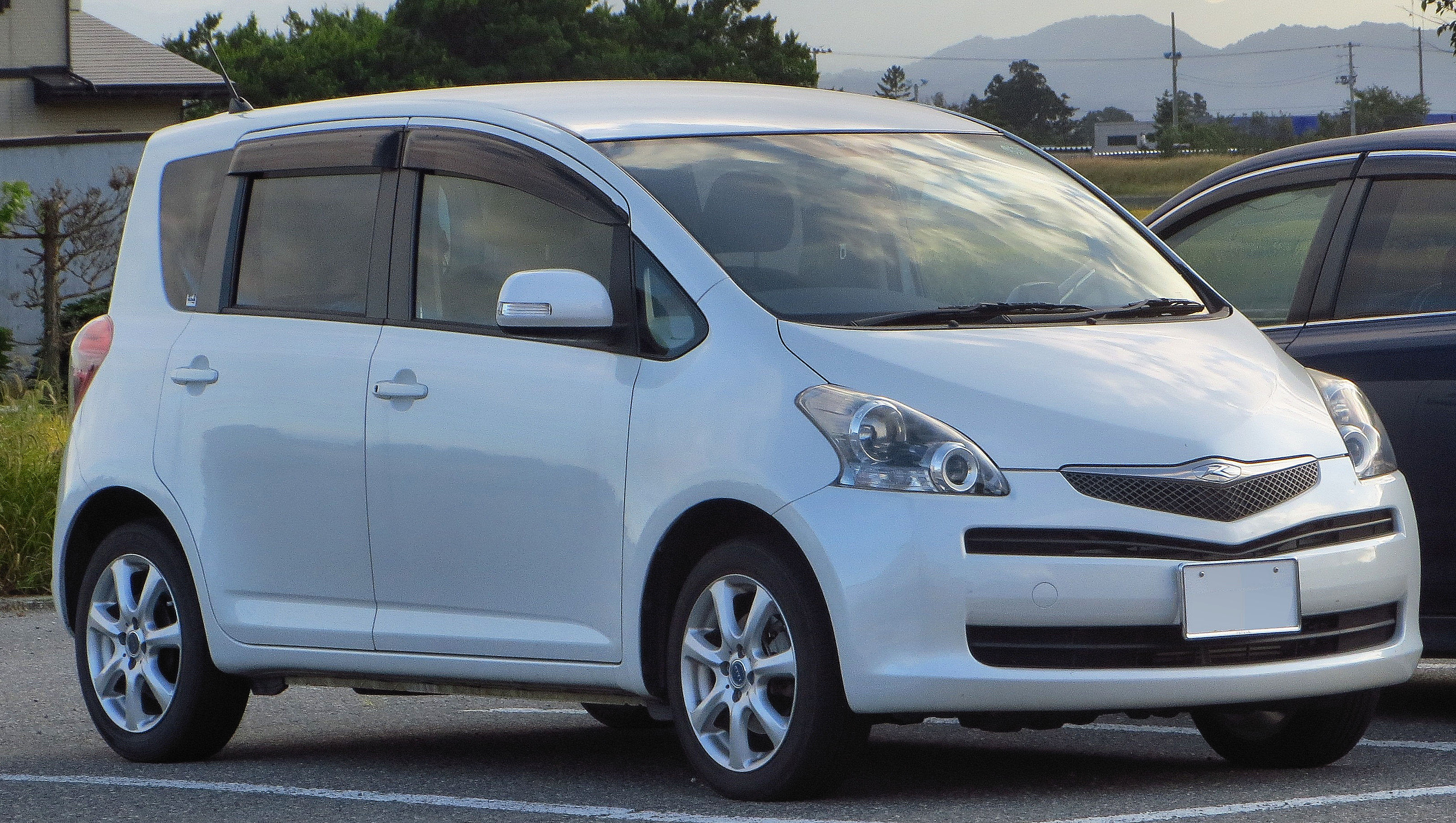
2007–2010 Toyota Ractis 1.3 X Package (Japan)

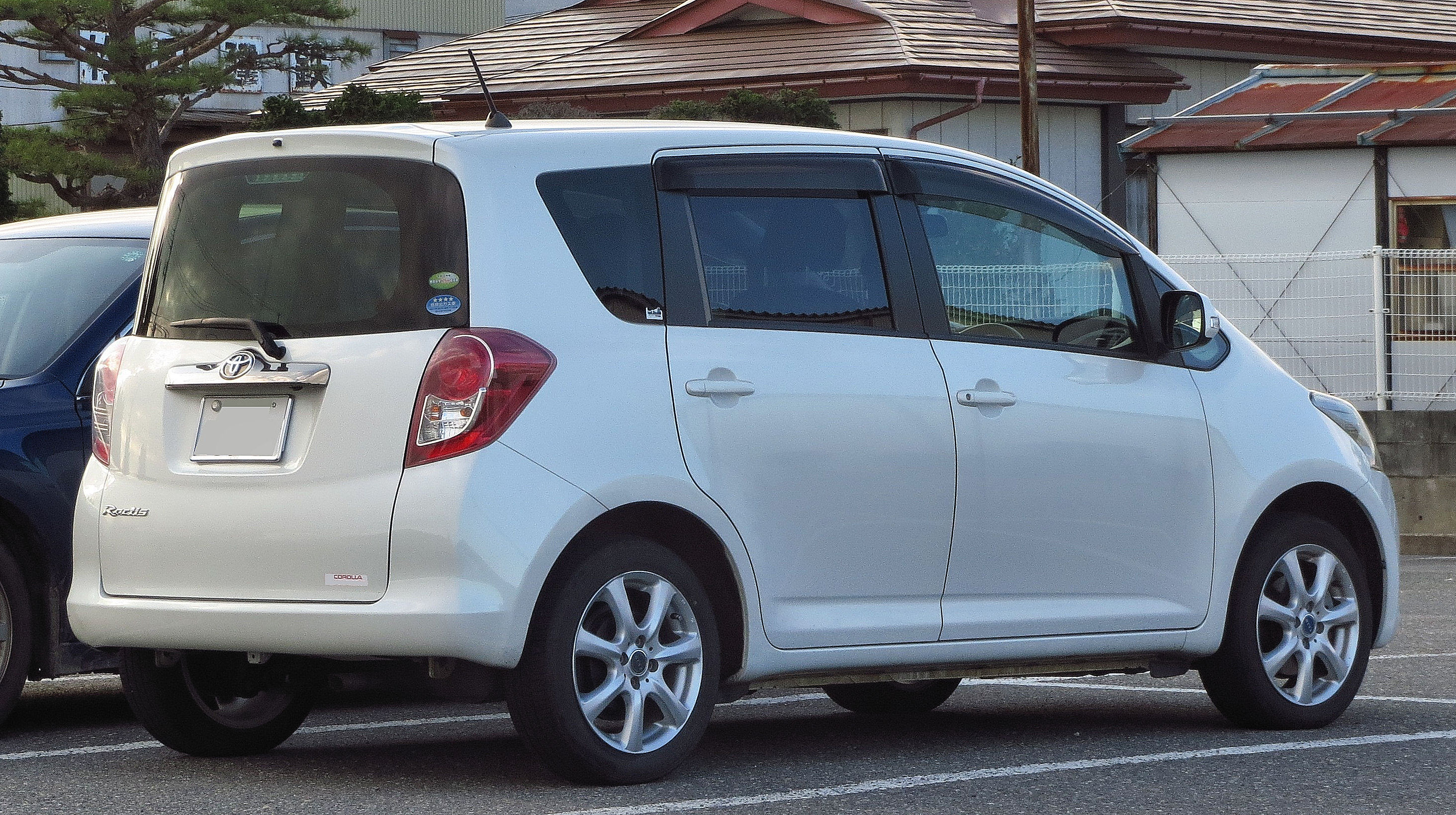
2007–2010 Toyota Ractis 1.3 X Package (Japan)

== Second generation (XP120; 2010) ==
Second generation
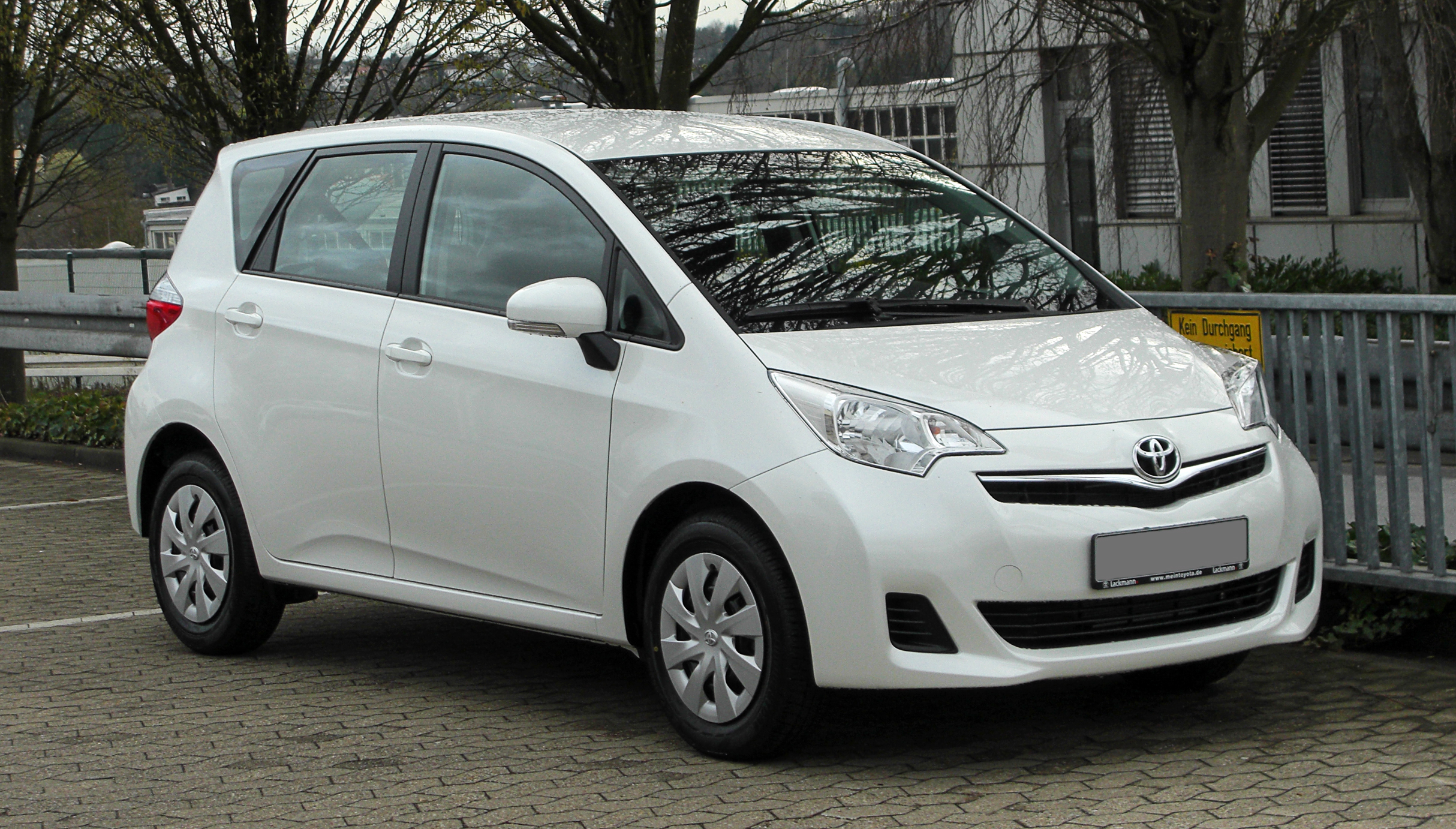
- Toyota Verso-S 1.3 Life (pre-facelift, Germany)

Overview
- Model code: XP120
- Also called: Toyota Verso-S (Europe); Toyota Space Verso; Subaru Trezia
- Production: September 2010 – June 2016 (Japan); December 2010 – December 2017 (Europe)
- Assembly: Japan: Kanegasaki, Iwate (Kanto Auto Works)

Body and chassis
- Related: Toyota Vitz (XP130)

Powertrain
- Engine: 1.3 L 1NR-FE Dual VVT-i I4 (petrol); 1.3 L 1NR-FKE VVT-iE I4 (petrol); 1.5 L 1NZ-FE VVT-i I4 (petrol); 1.4 L 1ND-TV I4 D-4D (turbo diesel)
- Transmission: 6-speed manual (Europe); CVT (Japan)

Dimensions
- Wheelbase: 2,550 mm (100.4 in)
- Length: 3,995 mm (157.3 in)
- Width: 1,695 mm (66.7 in)
- Height: 1,585–1,705 mm (62.4–67.1 in)
- Curb weight: 1,090–1,170 kg (2,403–2,579 lb)

Chronology
- Successor: Toyota Proace City (Europe)

The second generation Ractis was unveiled at the 2010 Paris Motor Show as the Toyota Verso-S (Japanese: トヨタ・ヴァーソ・S, Toyota Vuāso S). The Ractis is produced at the Iwate plant by Kanto Auto Works. It is available in 1.3 L and 1.5 L engines with G, X and S grades in Japan. The introduction of the Verso-S marked the re-entry of Toyota into the European B-MPV segment.

When it hit the market, the Verso-S had the shortest overall length of any mini MPV in Europe. The Verso-S is available with a choice of two engines, a 1.3-litre petrol unit or a 1.4-litre D-4D turbo-diesel unit, both mated to a six-speed manual transmission. A handicap accessible model, the Welcab, was also available. The simplest version has a rotating front seat which can reach outside of the car; other variants can accommodate wheelchairs and some have extended roofs.

The petrol derivative is also offered with an optional, Multidrive S CVT, which features a seven speed, sequential paddle shift mode. The petrol model delivers a combined fuel economy of 18.2 km/L (51 mpg_{‑imp}; 43 mpg_{‑US}) and CO_{2} emissions of 127 g/km. The diesel model delivers 23.25 km/L (66 mpg_{‑imp}; 55 mpg_{‑US}) and 113 g/km respectively.

Toyota UK discontinued the Verso-S in 2013. On June 30, 2016, Toyota confirmed that the Ractis reached the end of production for Japanese, Hong Kong and Macau markets, but the Verso-S continued to be produced for European markets until 2017. Sales of the Ractis in Japan ended on August 31, 2016. It was succeeded by the Toyota Tank/Roomy.

The five-seater variant of the facelifted XP170 Sienta, the Funbase, which was released on September 11, 2018, is also considered as the successor of the Ractis.

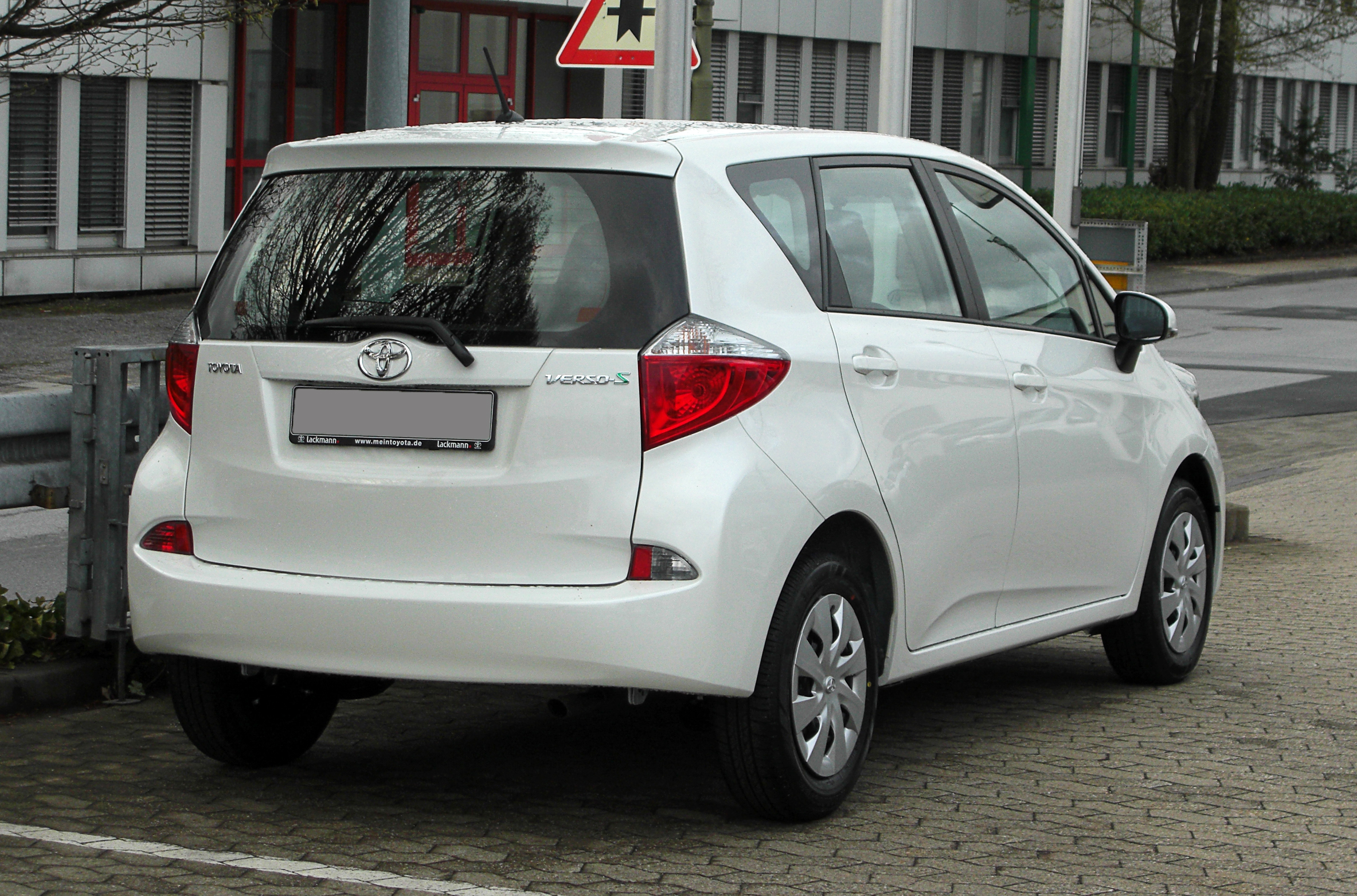
Toyota Verso-S 1.3 Life (pre-facelift, Germany)

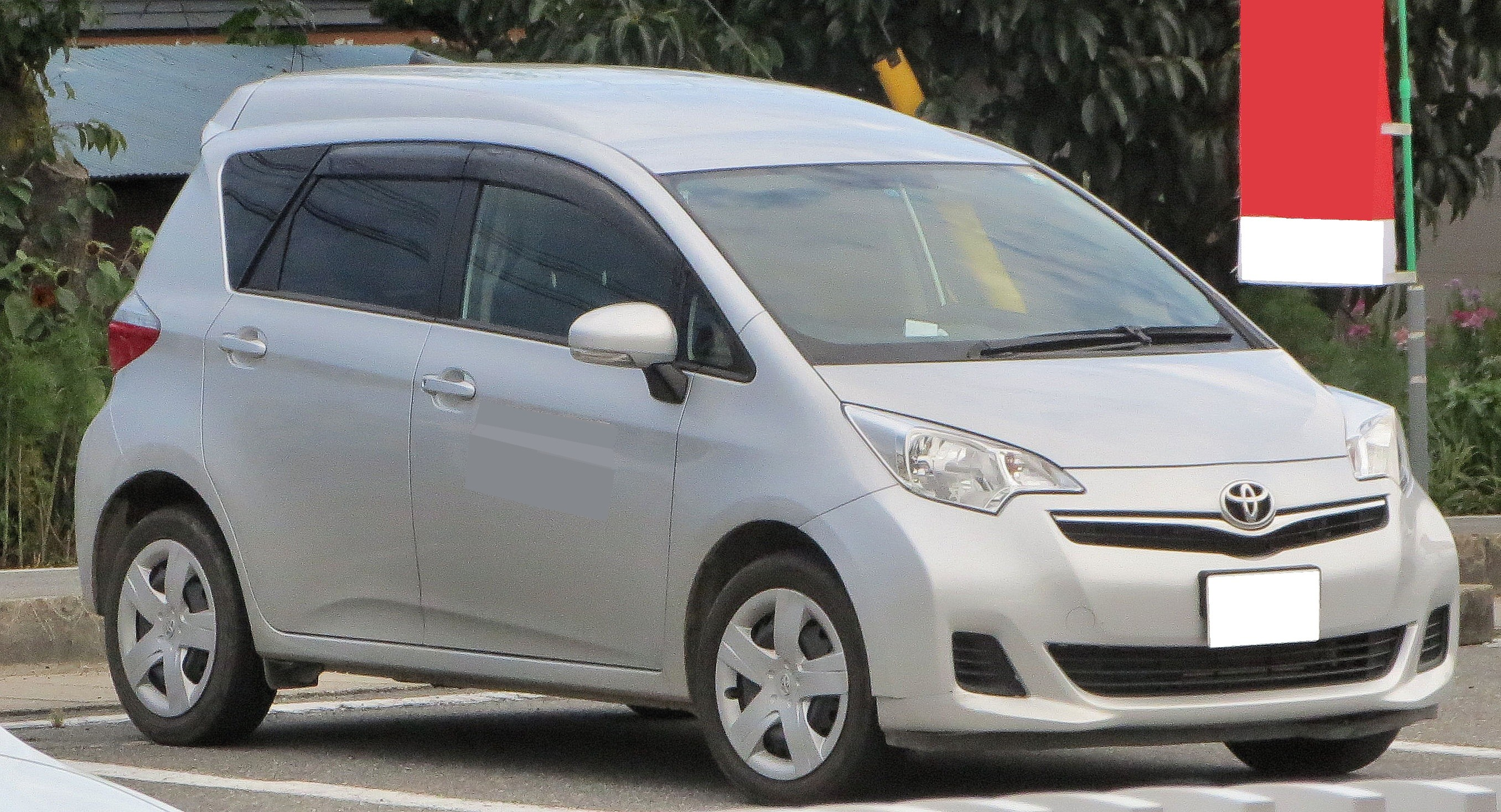
Toyota Ractis Welcab Type II (pre-facelift, Japan)

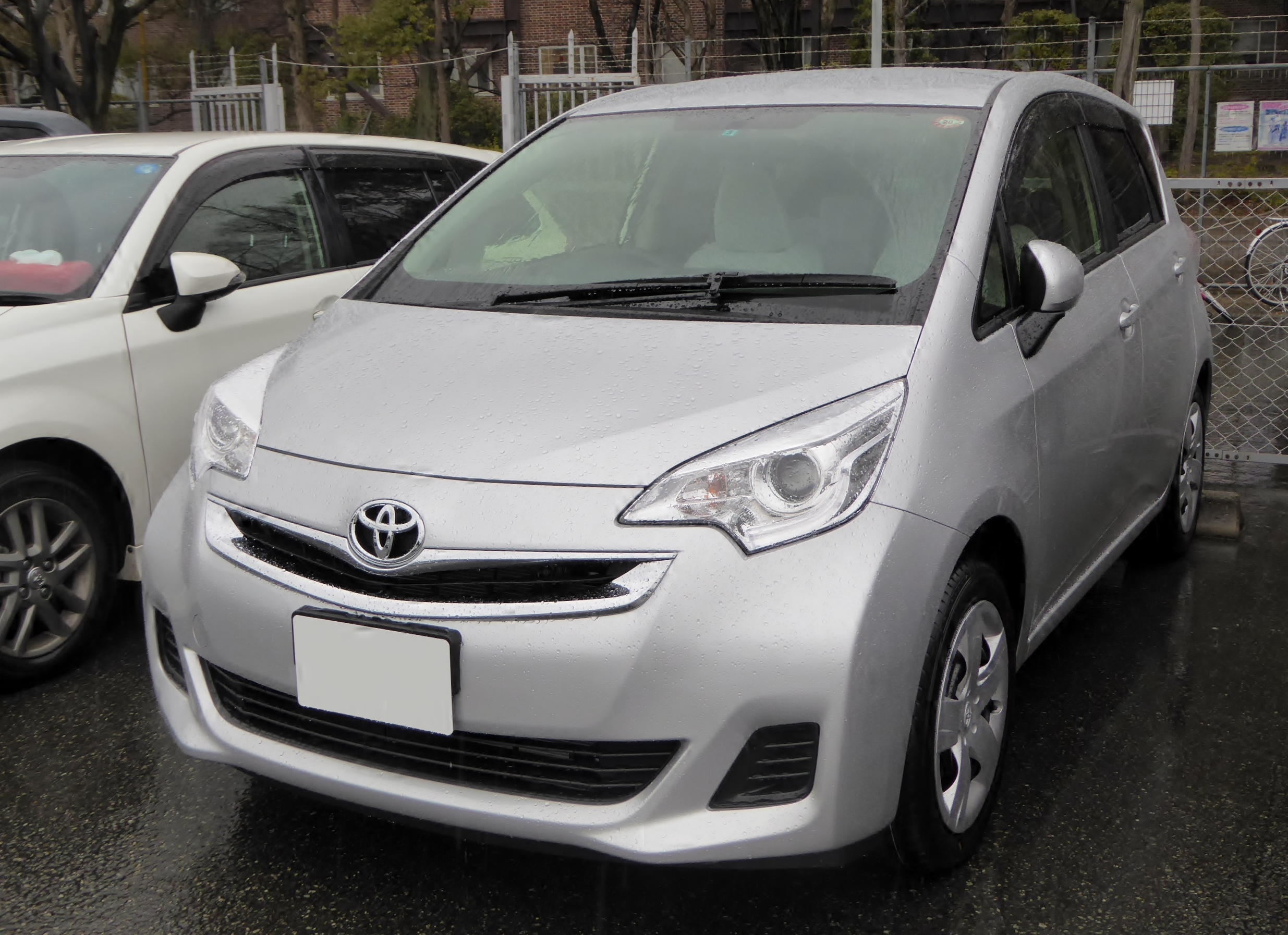
Toyota Ractis G (facelift, Japan)

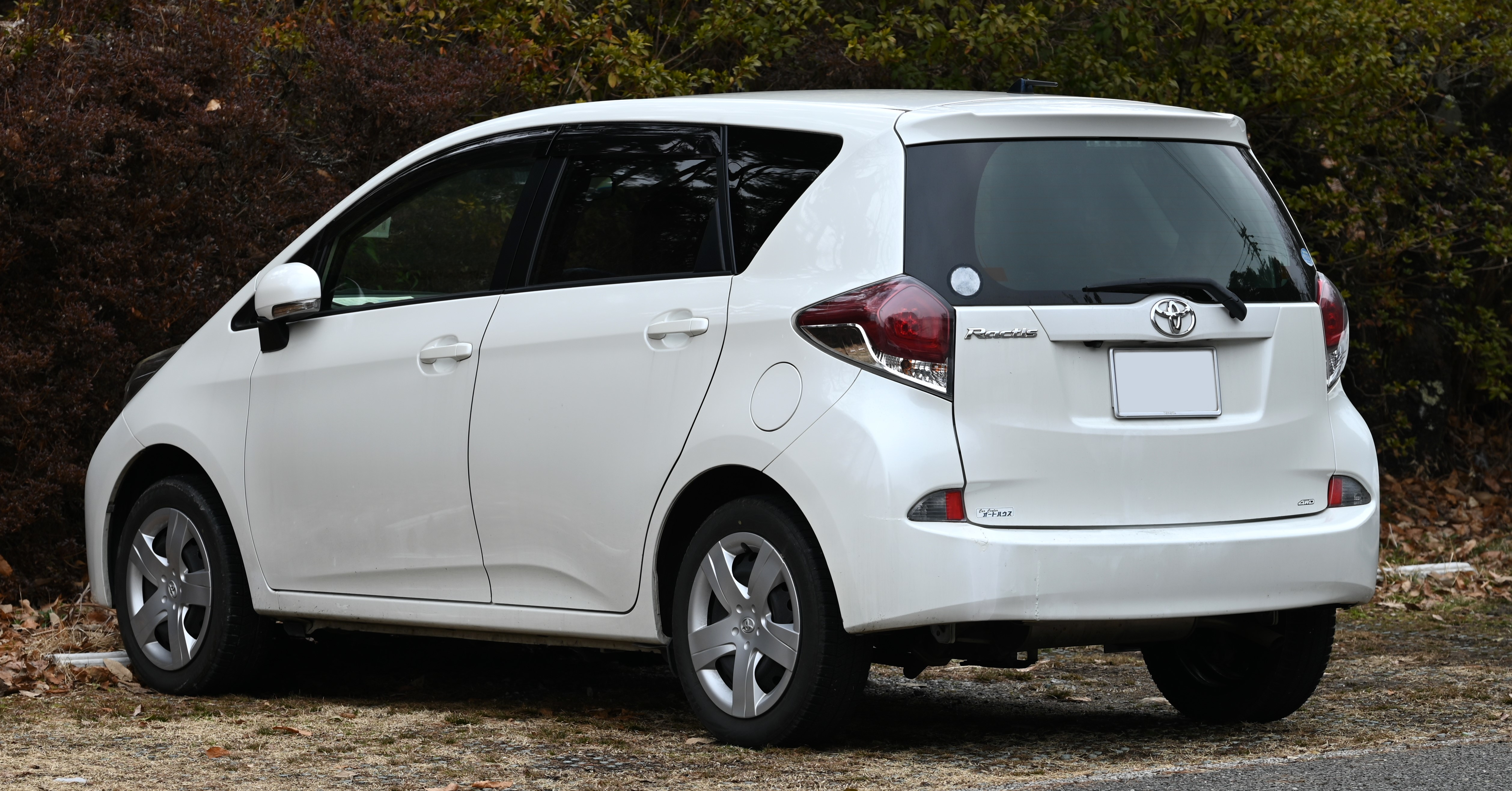
Toyota Ractis G (facelift, Japan)

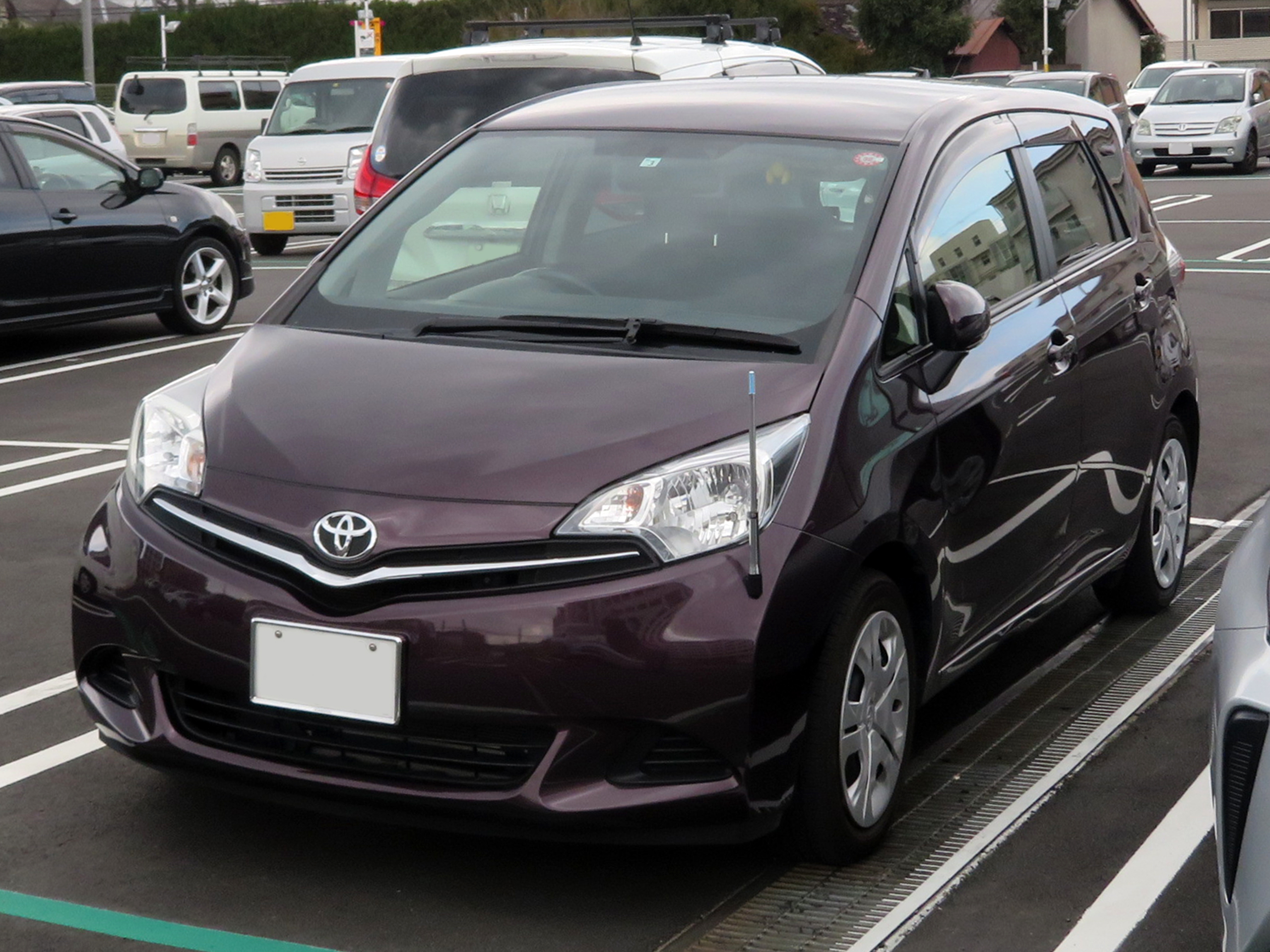
Toyota Ractis Lepice (Japan)

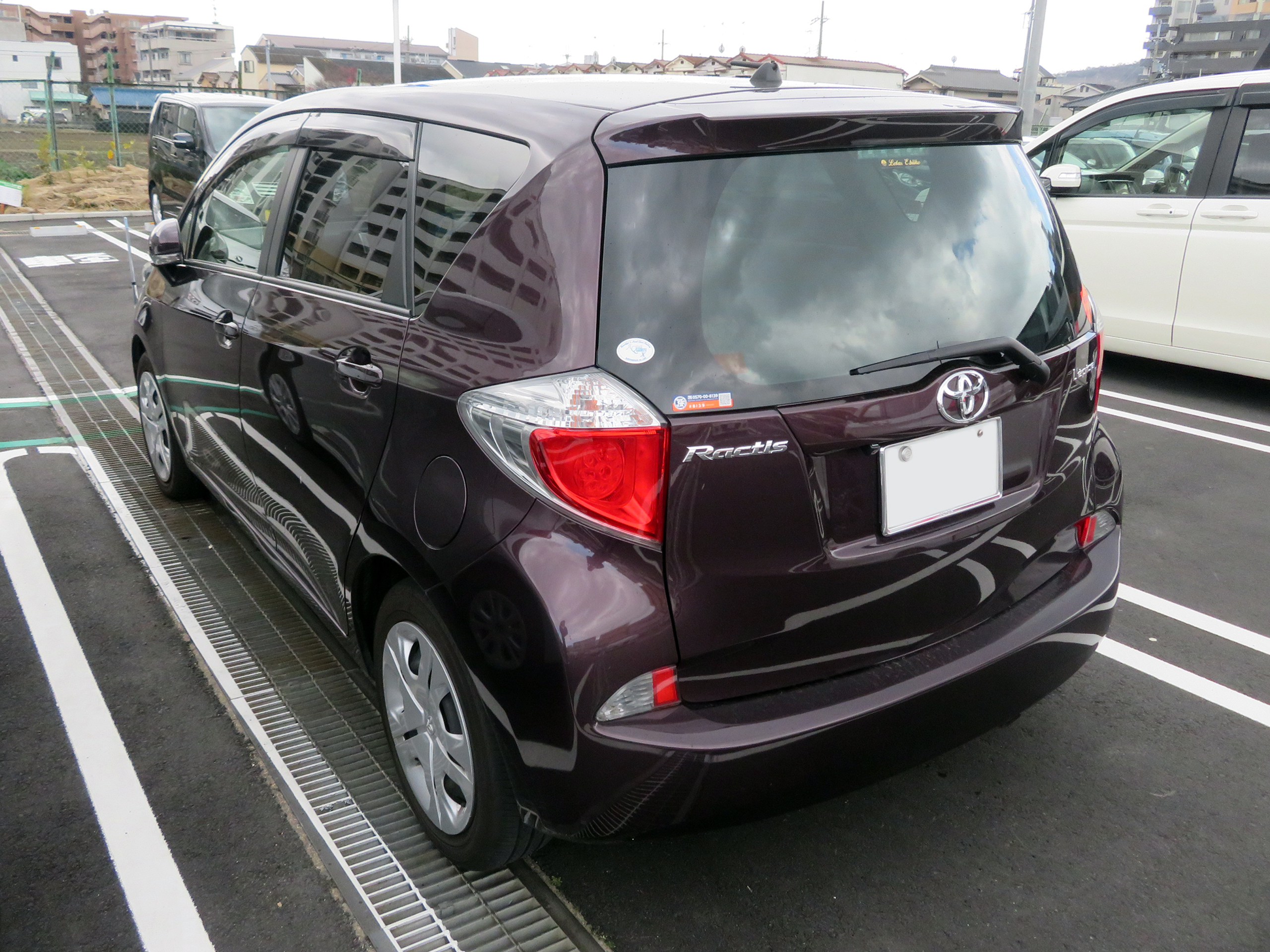
Toyota Ractis Lepice (Japan)

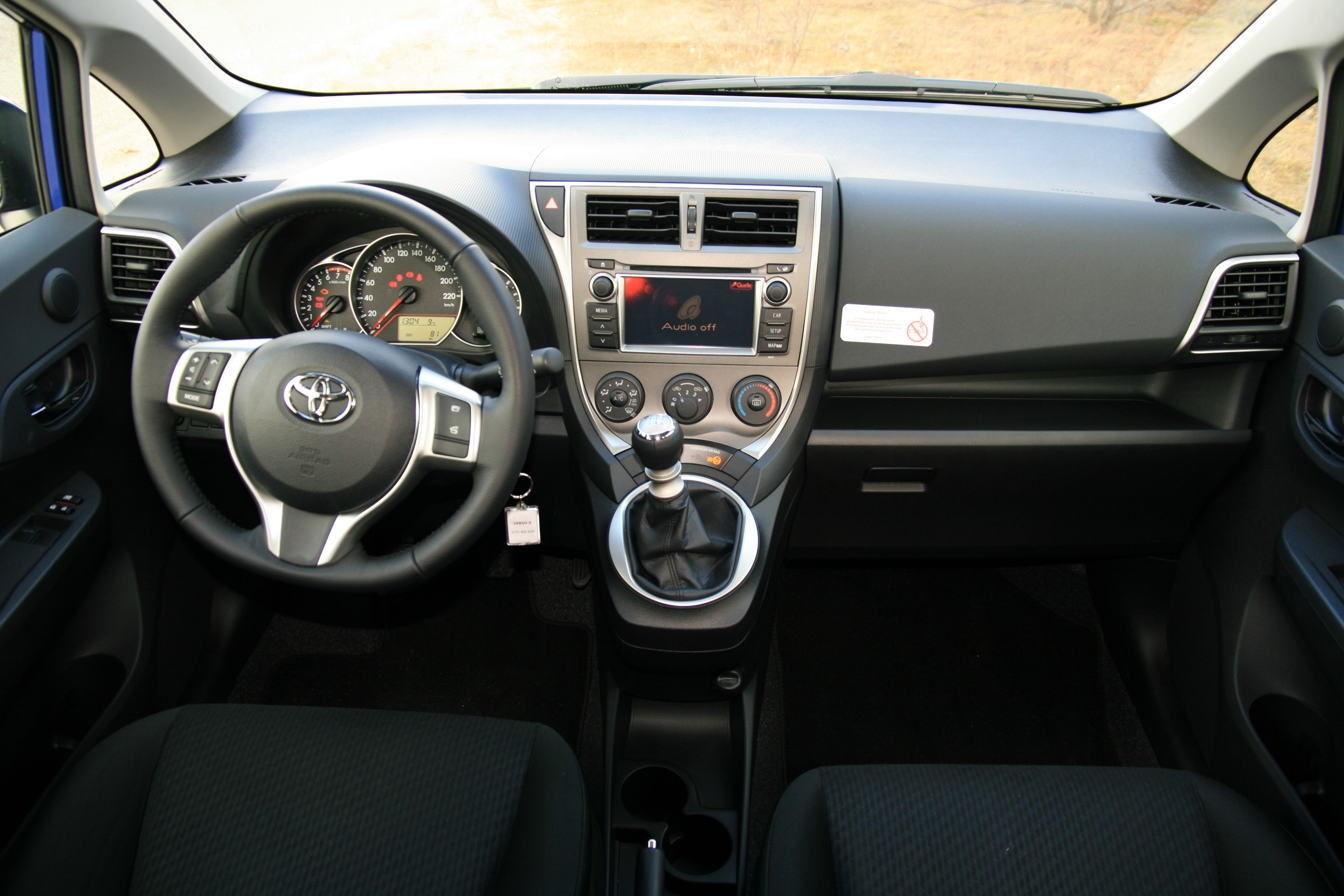
Toyota Verso-S interior

=== Subaru Trezia ===
Subaru announced a rebadged OEM version of the Ractis for the Japanese market on November 29, 2010. Known as the Subaru Trezia (Japanese: スバル・トレジア, Subaru Torejia), the badge engineered model receives unique bumpers, grille, bonnet, front fenders, headlights, rear finisher, and tail light lenses. The name "Trezia" derives from the English language word "treasure".

Engines available consisted of a 1.3-litre 1NR-FE and 1.5-litre 1NZ-FE, coupled with a CVT. Front-wheel drive is offered as the entry level layout for both engines, with all-wheel drive available as an upgrade on the 1.5-litre version. In January 2011, Subaru showed an STI-tuned "Trezia STI" at the Tokyo Auto Salon.

The Trezia was also sold in Europe in LHD form, but not in RHD markets such as the United Kingdom or Ireland.

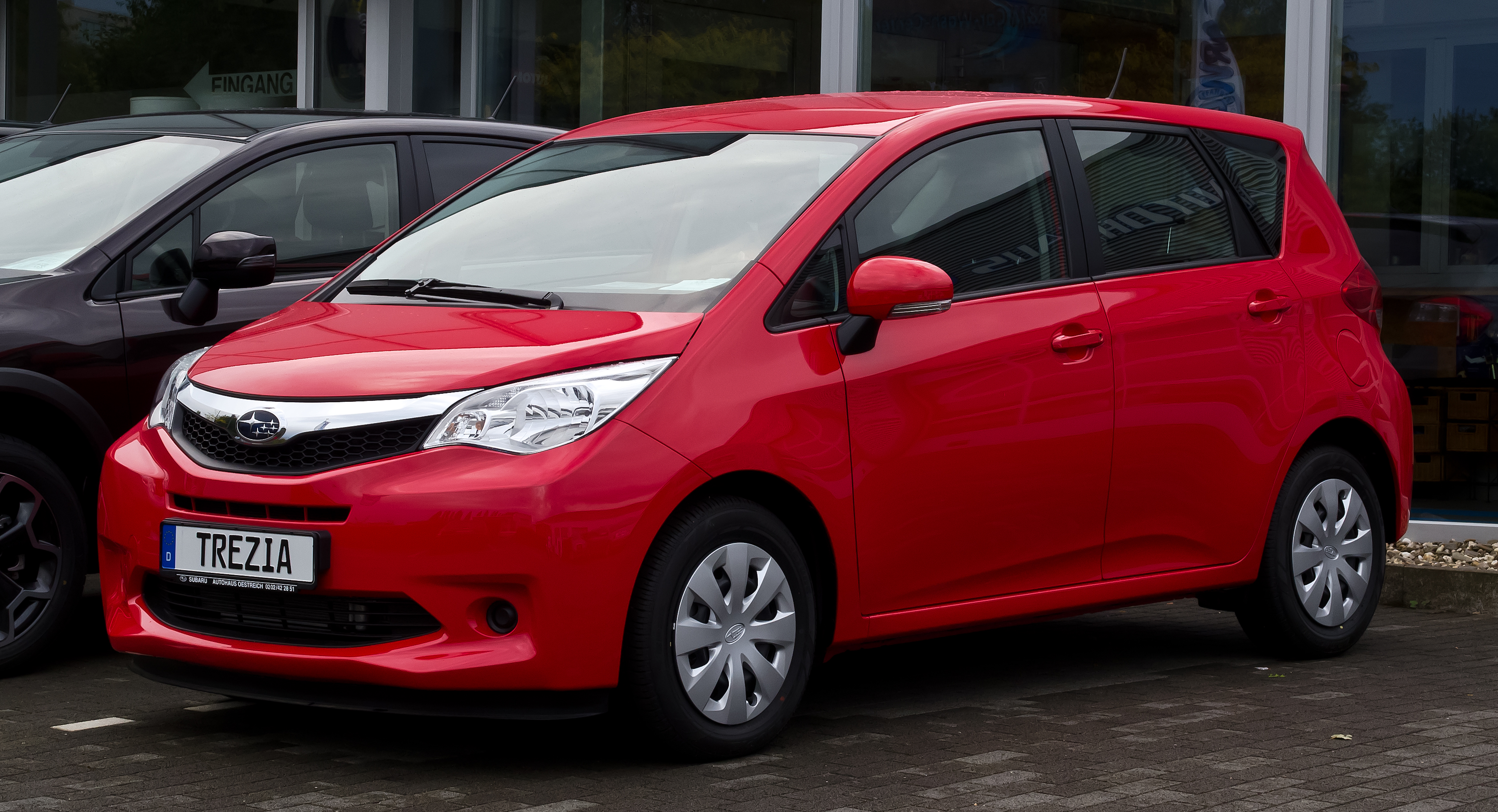
Subaru Trezia 1.4D Active (Germany)

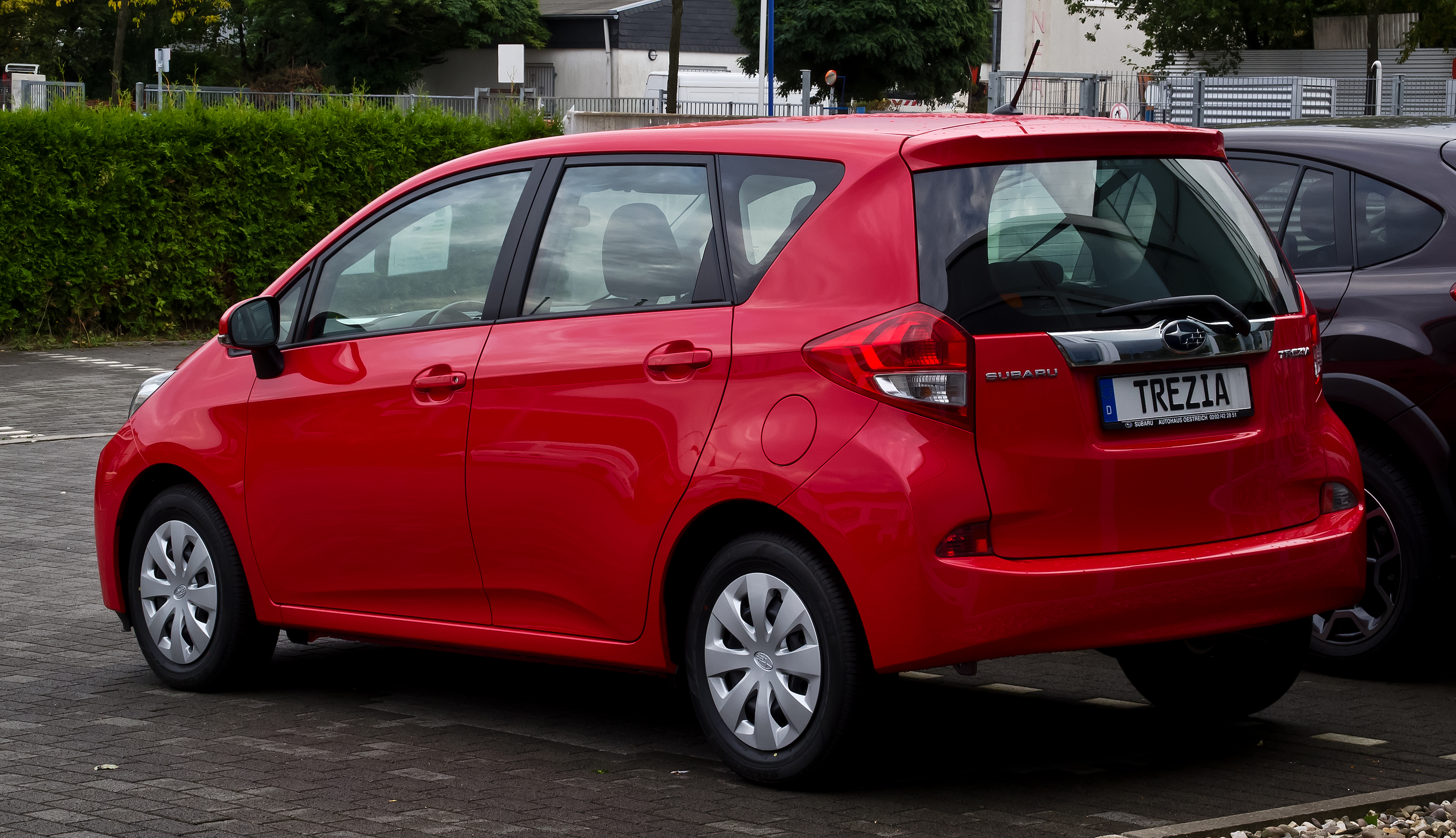
Subaru Trezia 1.4D Active (Germany)
