= Daihatsu Thor =

Mini MPV produced by Daihatsu

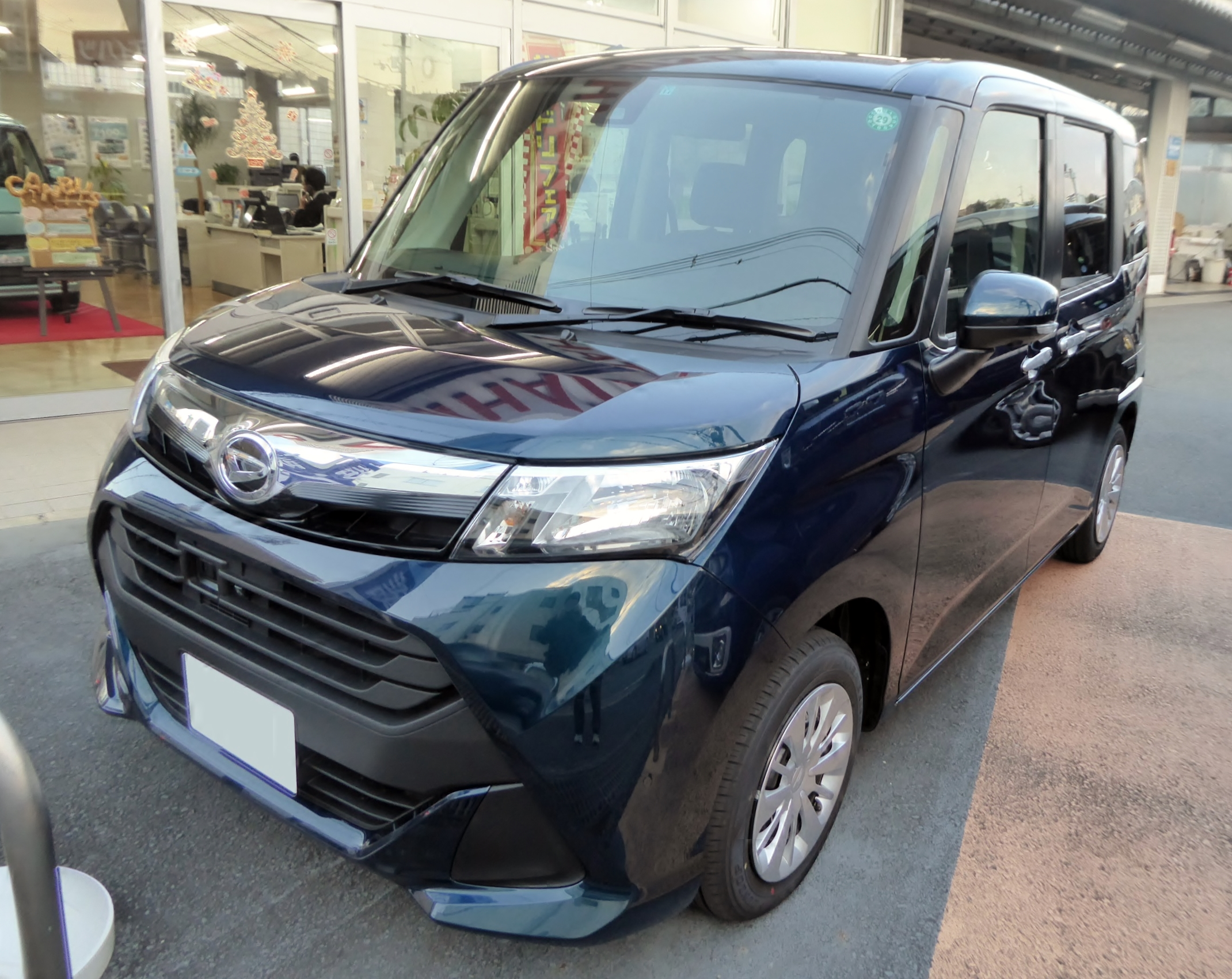
- Daihatsu Thor G SA II (M900S, pre-facelift)

Overview
- Manufacturer: Daihatsu
- Model code: M900
- Also called: Toyota Roomy; Toyota Tank (2016–2020); Subaru Justy
- Production: November 2016 – present
- Assembly: Japan: Ikeda, Osaka (Ikeda plant)

Body and chassis
- Class: Mini MPV
- Body style: 5-door minivan
- Layout: Front-engine, front-wheel-drive; Front-engine, four-wheel-drive
- Related: Daihatsu Boon (M700)

Powertrain
- Engine: Petrol: 996 cc 1KR-FE I3; 996 cc 1KR-VET turbo I3
- Power output: 51 kW (68 hp; 69 PS) (1KR-FE); 72 kW (97 hp; 98 PS) (1KR-VET)
- Transmission: CVT

Dimensions
- Wheelbase: 2,490 mm (98.0 in)
- Length: 3,700–3,725 mm (145.7–146.7 in)
- Width: 1,670 mm (65.7 in)
- Height: 1,735 mm (68.3 in)
- Kerb weight: 1,070–1,110 kg (2,359–2,447 lb) (FWD); 1,130–1,140 kg (2,491–2,513 lb) (4WD)

Chronology
- Predecessor: Daihatsu Coo (Thor); Toyota bB (Roomy/Tank); Toyota Ractis (Roomy/Tank); Subaru Dex (Justy); Subaru Trezia (Justy)

The Daihatsu Thor (Japanese: ダイハツ・トール, Hepburn: Daihatsu Tōru) (also called Toyota Roomy/Tank (Japanese: トヨタ・ルーミー/トヨタ・タンク, Hepburn: Toyota Rūmī/Toyota Tanku) and Subaru Justy (Japanese: スバル・ジャスティ, Hepburn: Subaru Jasuti)) is a mini MPV with sliding doors designed and manufactured by Daihatsu, and sold by Daihatsu, Toyota and Subaru. It is a five-seat MPV based on the M700 series Boon and was introduced on 9 November 2016 as the successor to the Coo. It sits below the Sienta in Toyota's minivan line-up.

The Thor is currently sold only in Japan. It is not a kei car, as the exterior dimensions and the engine displacement of 996 cc exceed the class regulations, but the small engine still incurs a modest annual road tax obligation. From 2016 until 2020, the Tank was exclusive to Toyopet Store and Netz Store, while the Roomy was once exclusive to Toyota Store and Corolla Store.

For the pre-facelift models, the regular Thor shared its front bumper shape with the Tank (both regular and Custom models) and the Justy Custom (with a redesigned upper grille and cross-hatched lower grille). The Thor Custom's bumper shape is shared with the Roomy (both regular and Custom models) and the regular Justy (with black grille slats instead of chrome). The Roomy uses standard taillights, while the Tank uses clear lens lights, which are reserved for the Custom versions of Thor and Justy. All Custom versions also wear an additional front splitter and chrome rear bootlid trim.

== Facelift ==
The Thor and Roomy received a facelift on 15 September 2020, along with the discontinuation of the Tank model due to the merger of several of the Japanese Toyota dealership chains. It was followed by the facelifted Justy in 24 September (the Justy Custom model being discontinued).

The facelifted regular Thor shared its front styling with the regular Roomy, while the Thor Custom is shared with the Roomy Custom and the Justy.

== Gallery ==
=== Thor ===
Pre-facelift

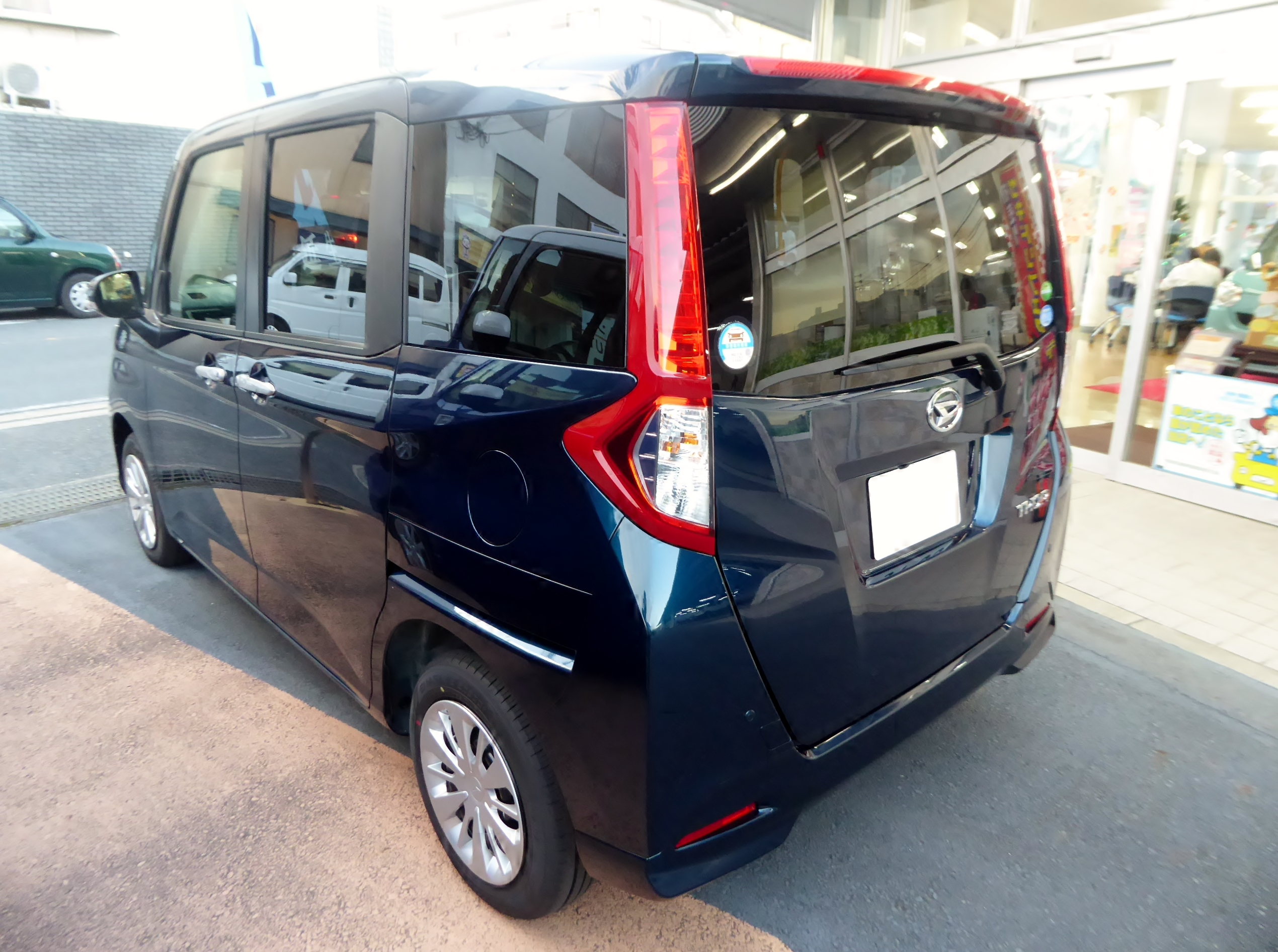
Thor G "SA II" (M900S)

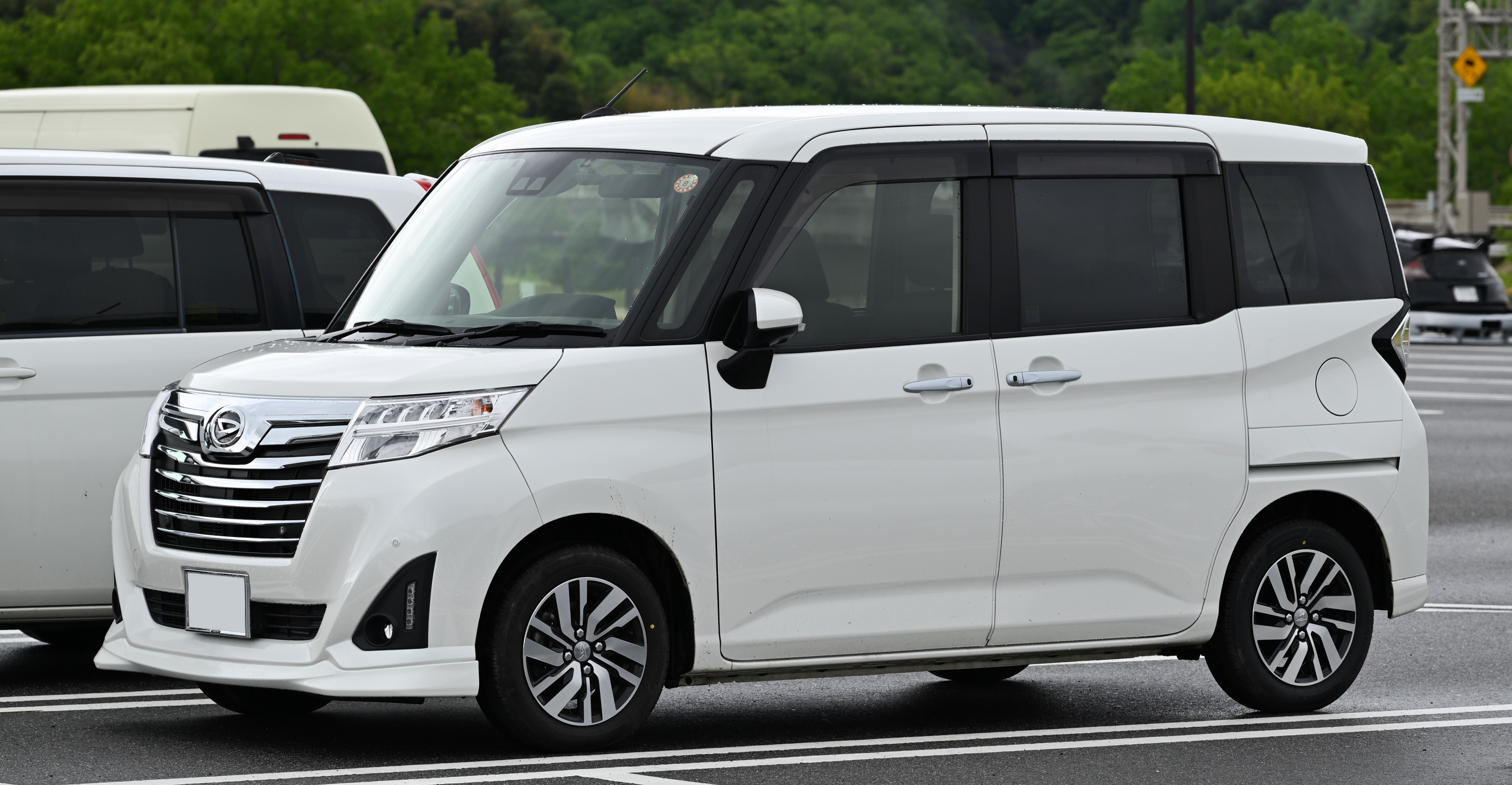
Thor Custom G "Limited SA III" (M900S)

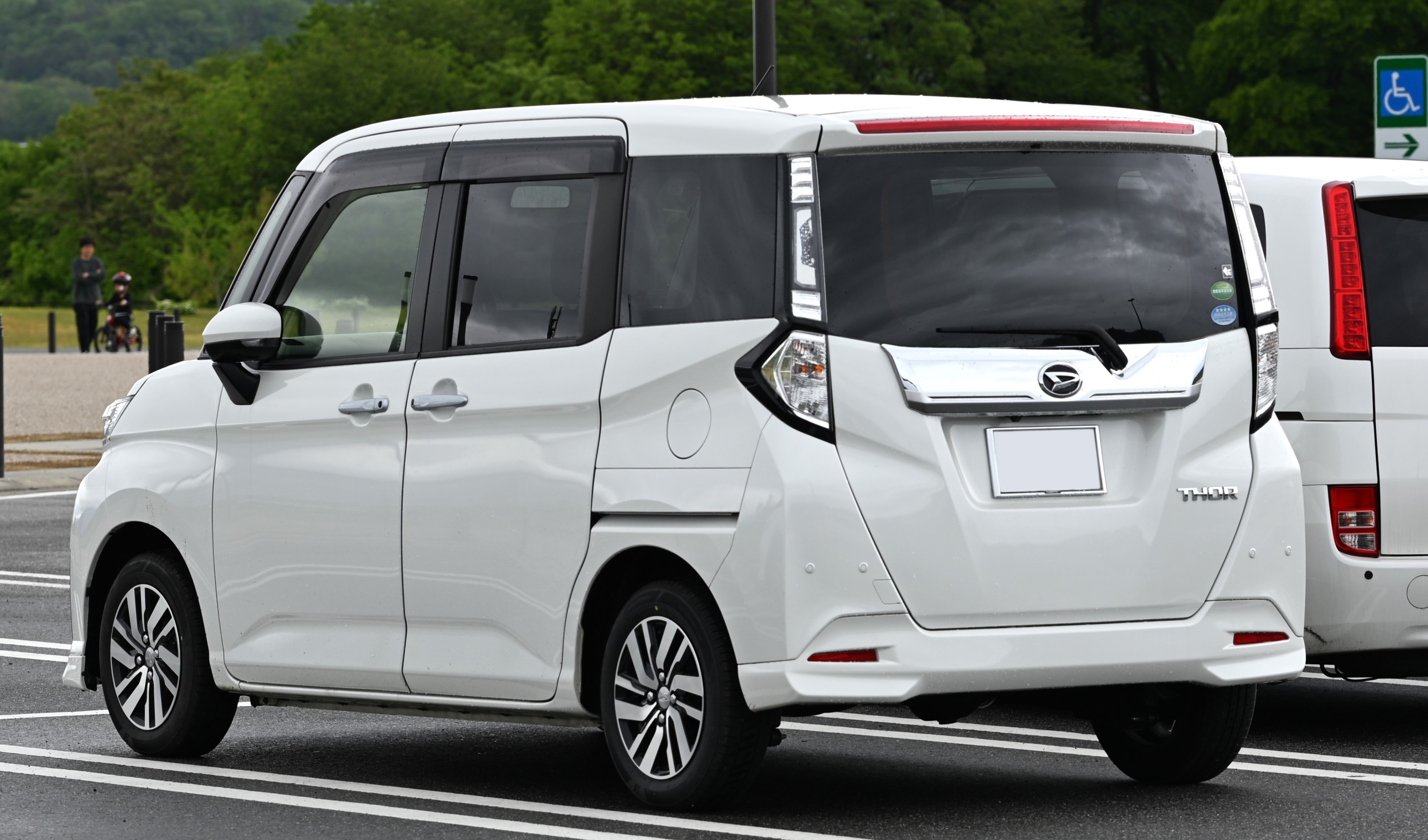
Thor Custom G "Limited SA III" (M900S)

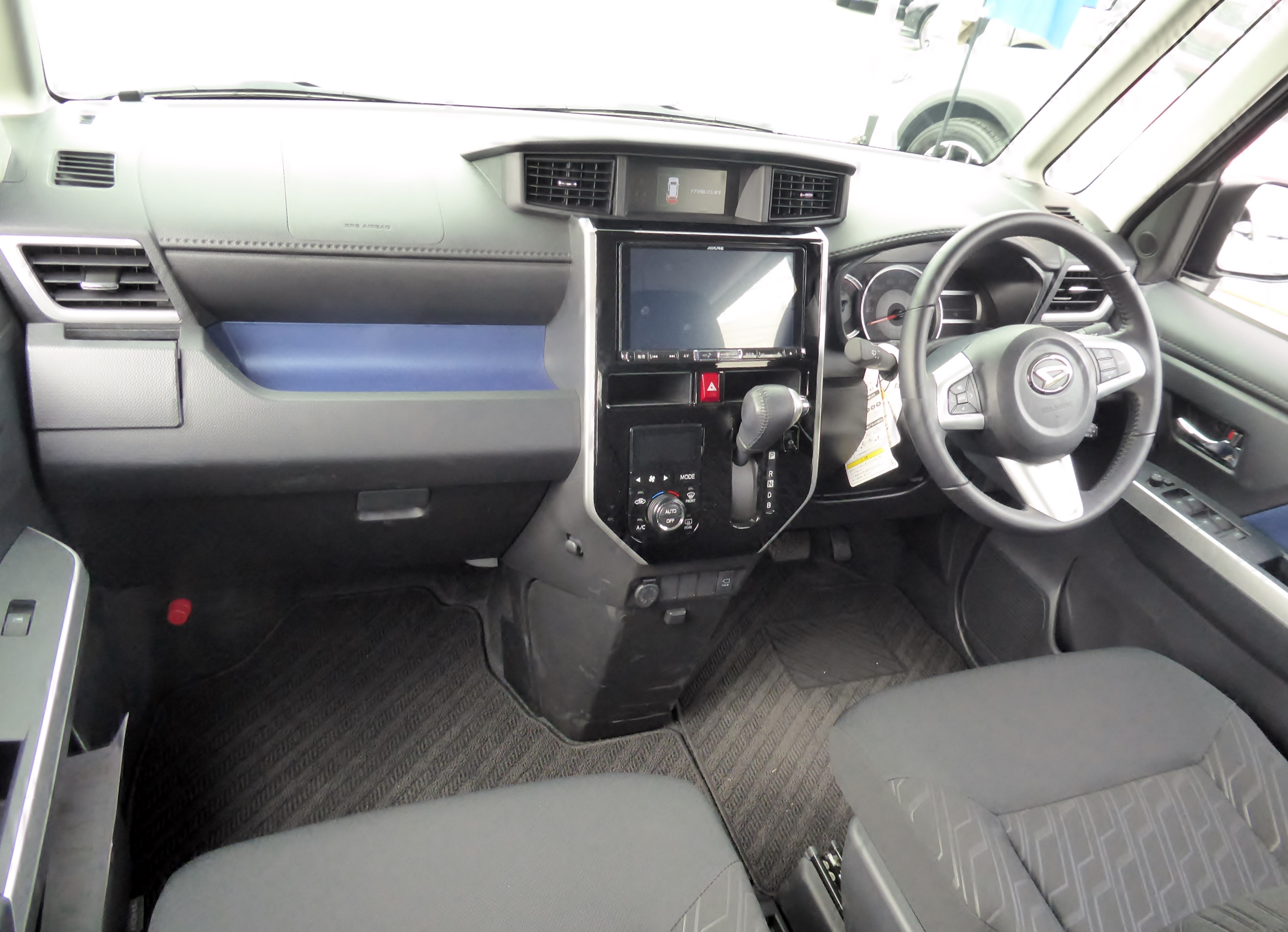
Interior

Facelift

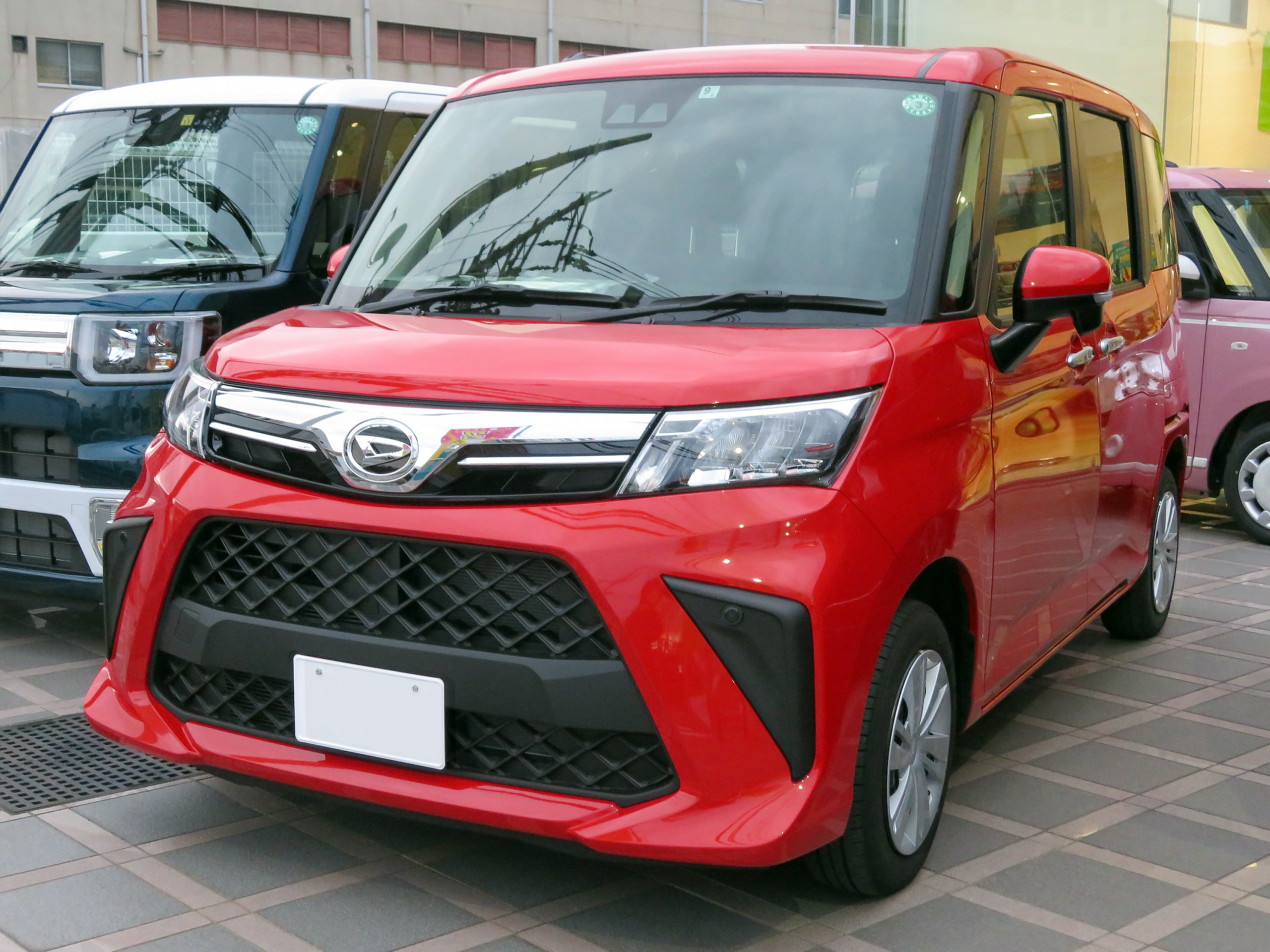
Thor G (M900S)

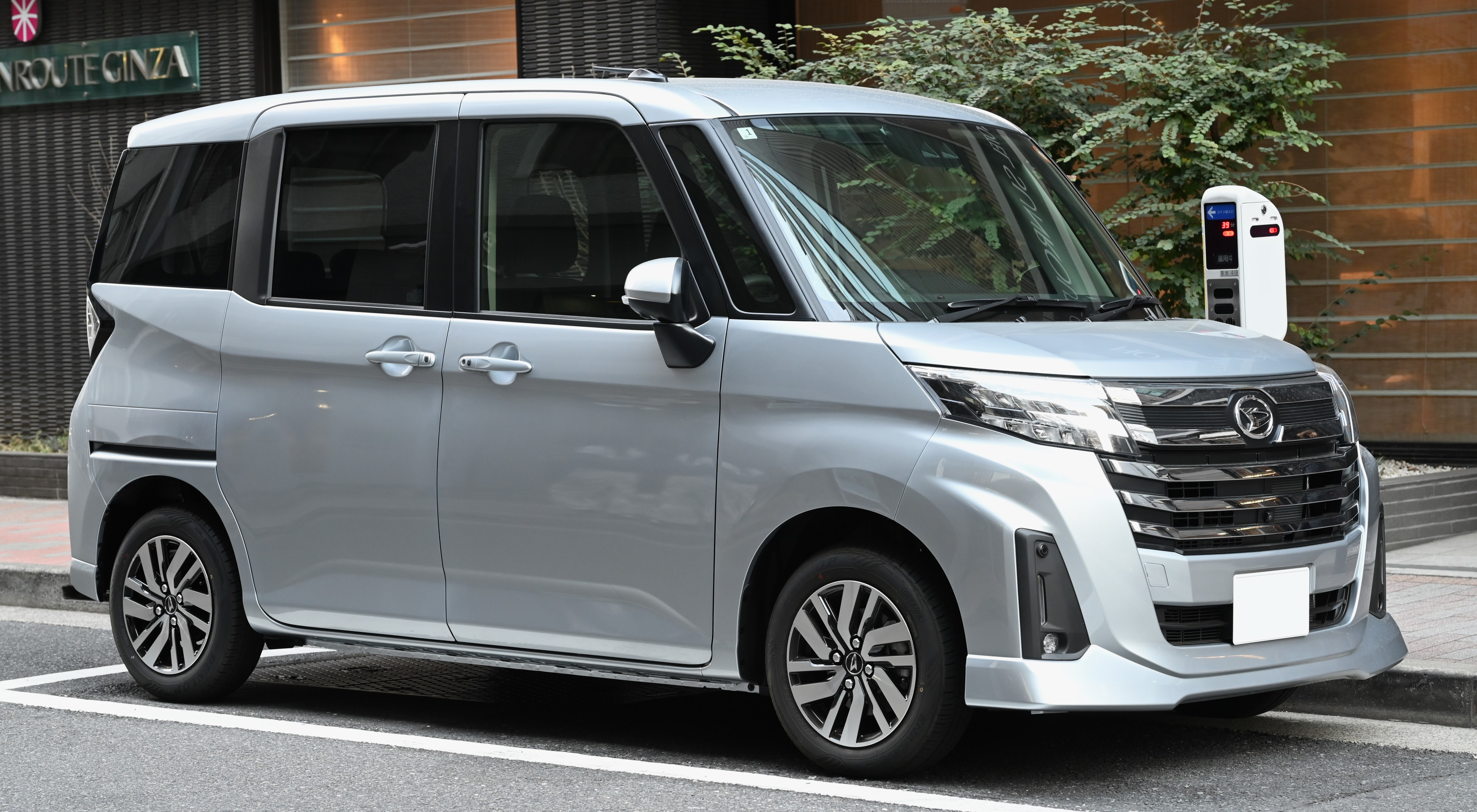
Thor Custom G (M900S)

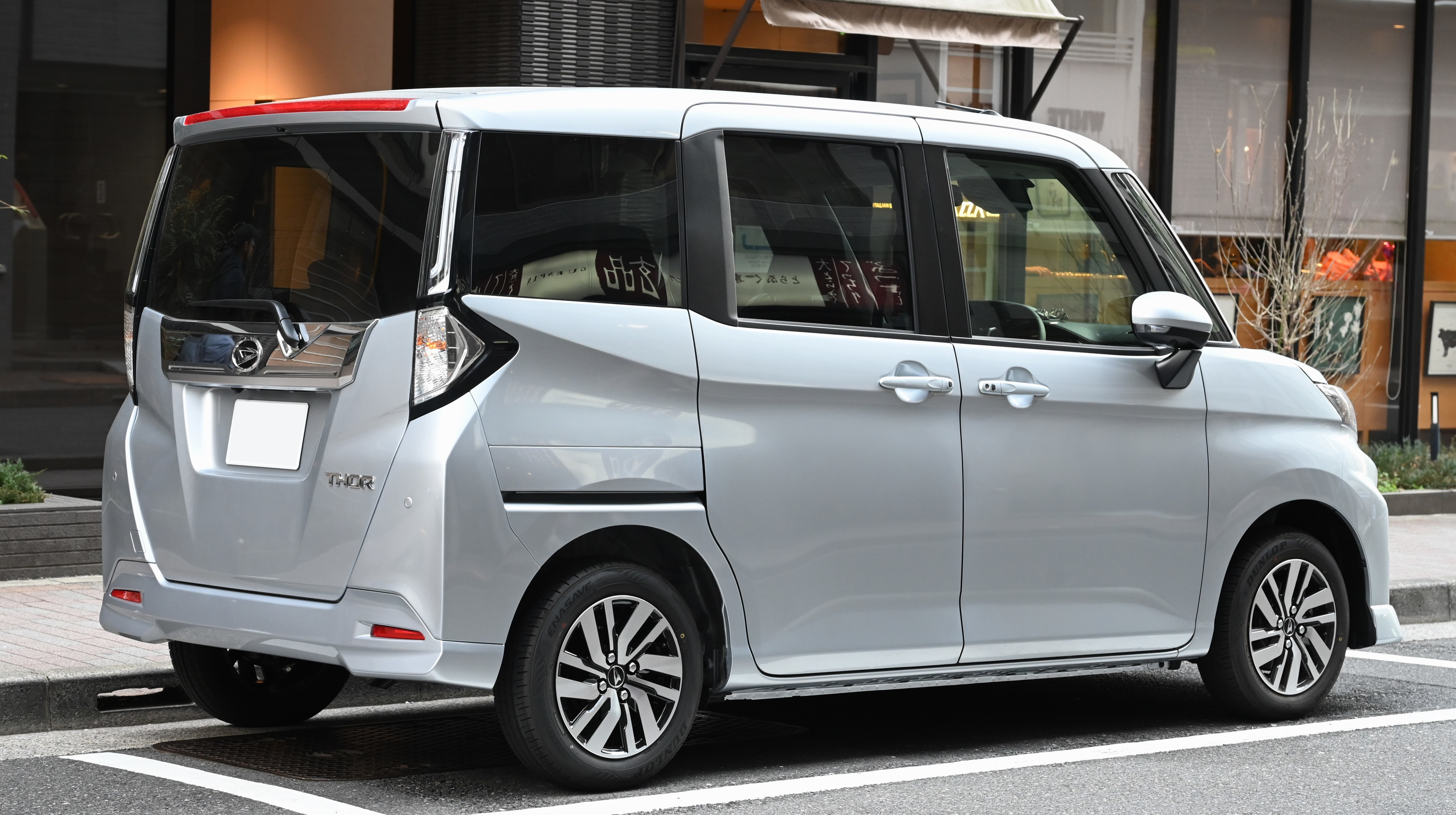
Thor Custom G (M900S)

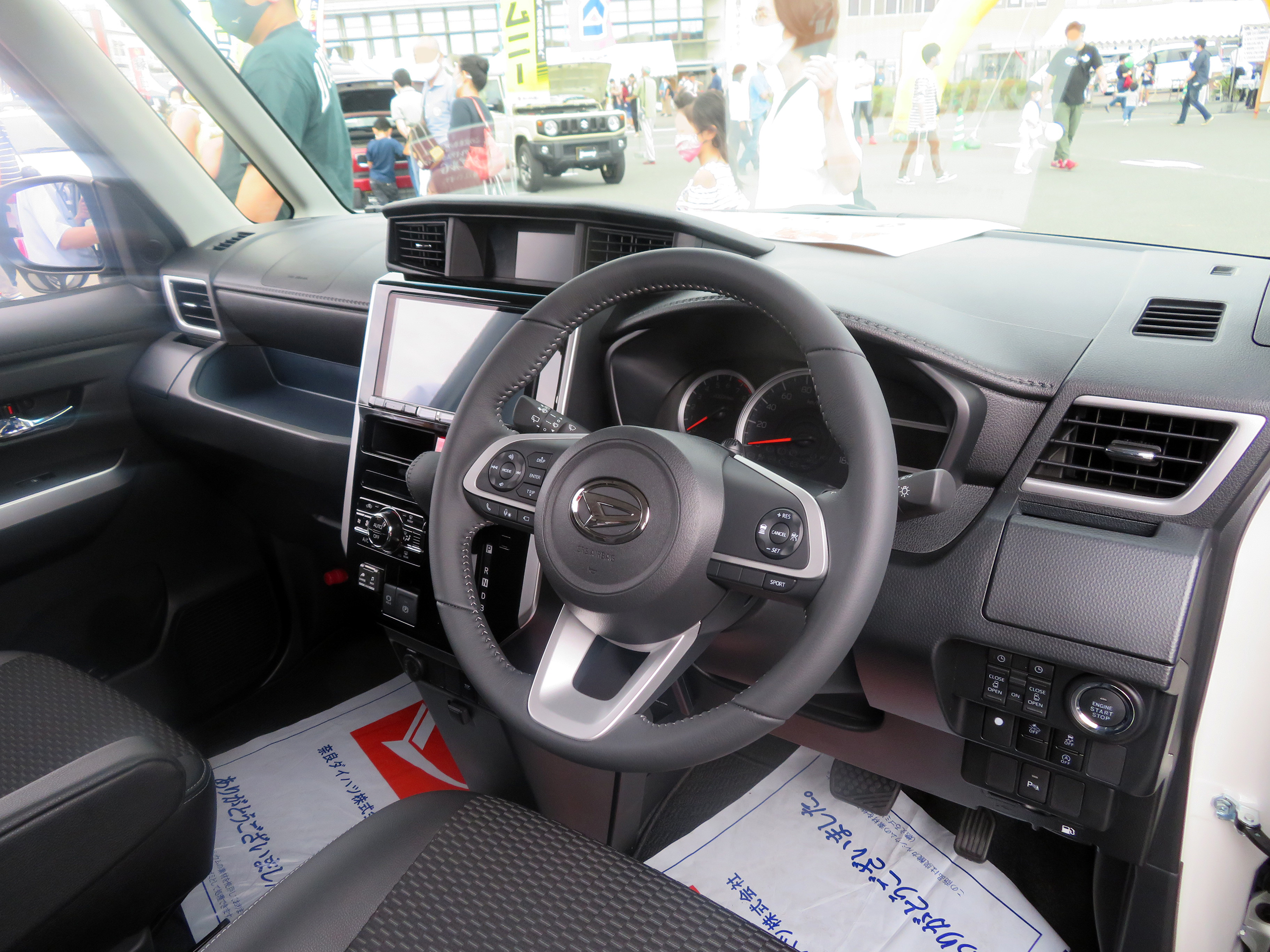
Interior

=== Roomy/Tank ===
Pre-facelift

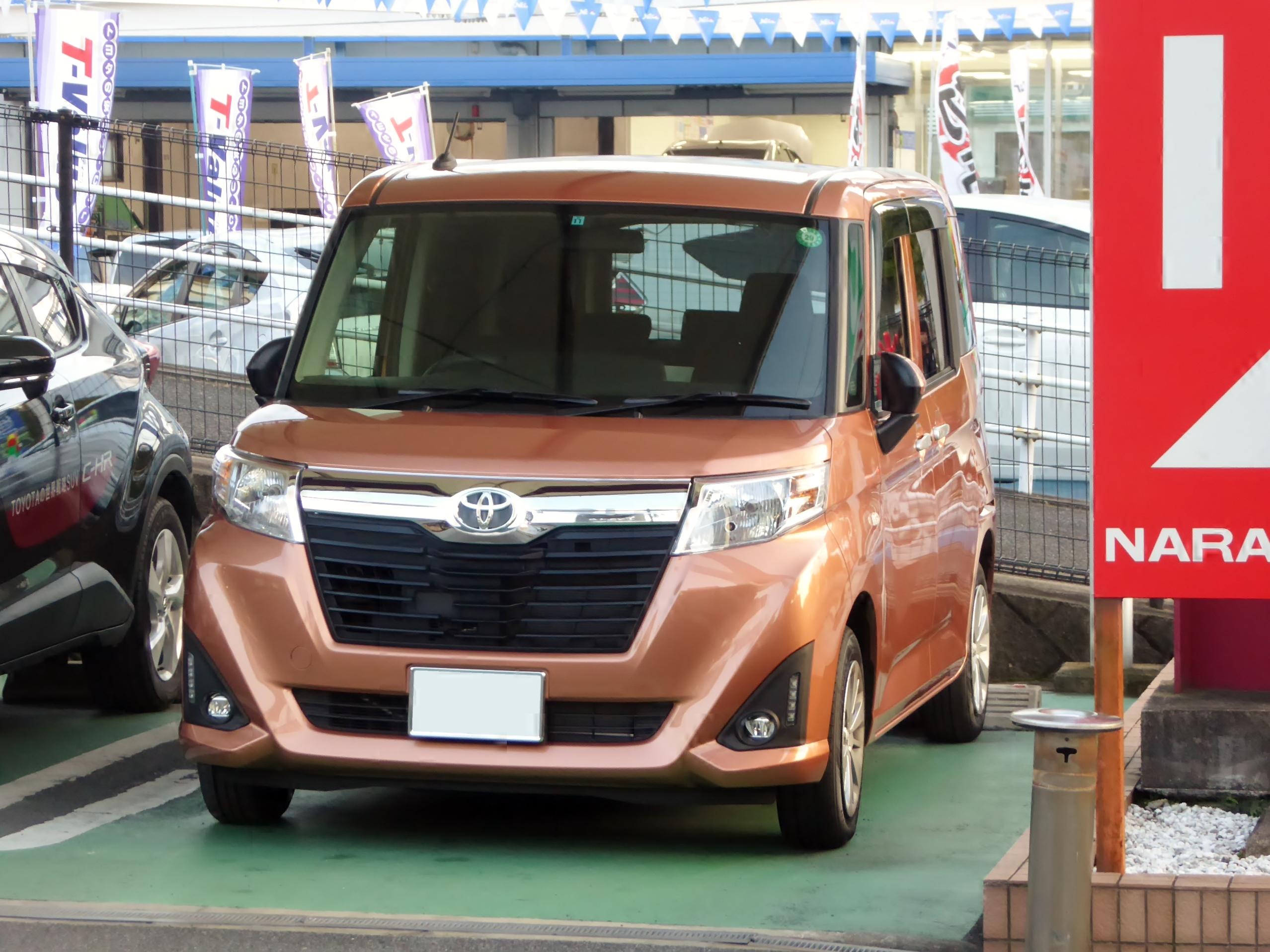
Toyota Roomy X"S" (M900A)

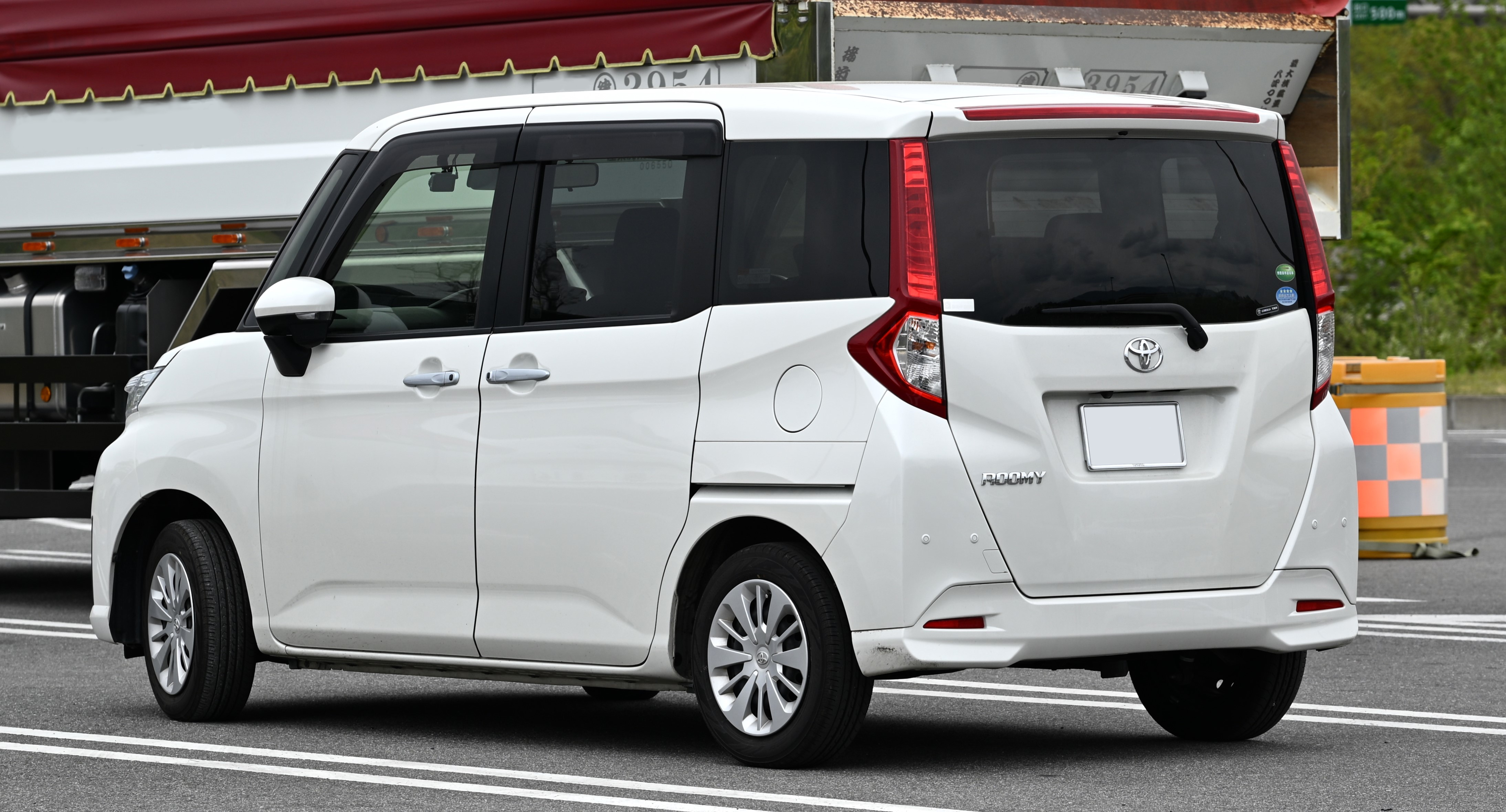
Roomy G (M900A)

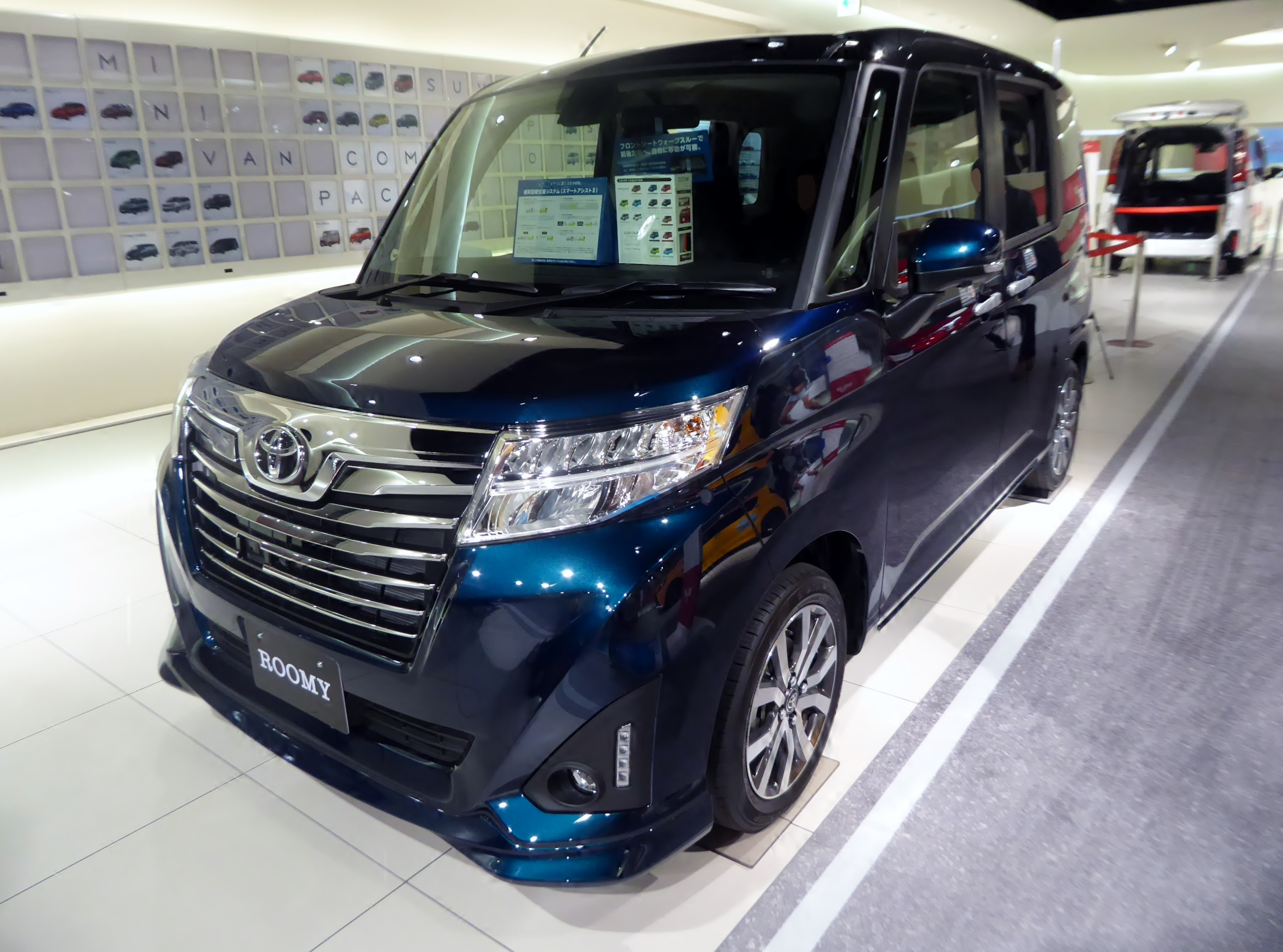
Roomy Custom G-T (M900A)

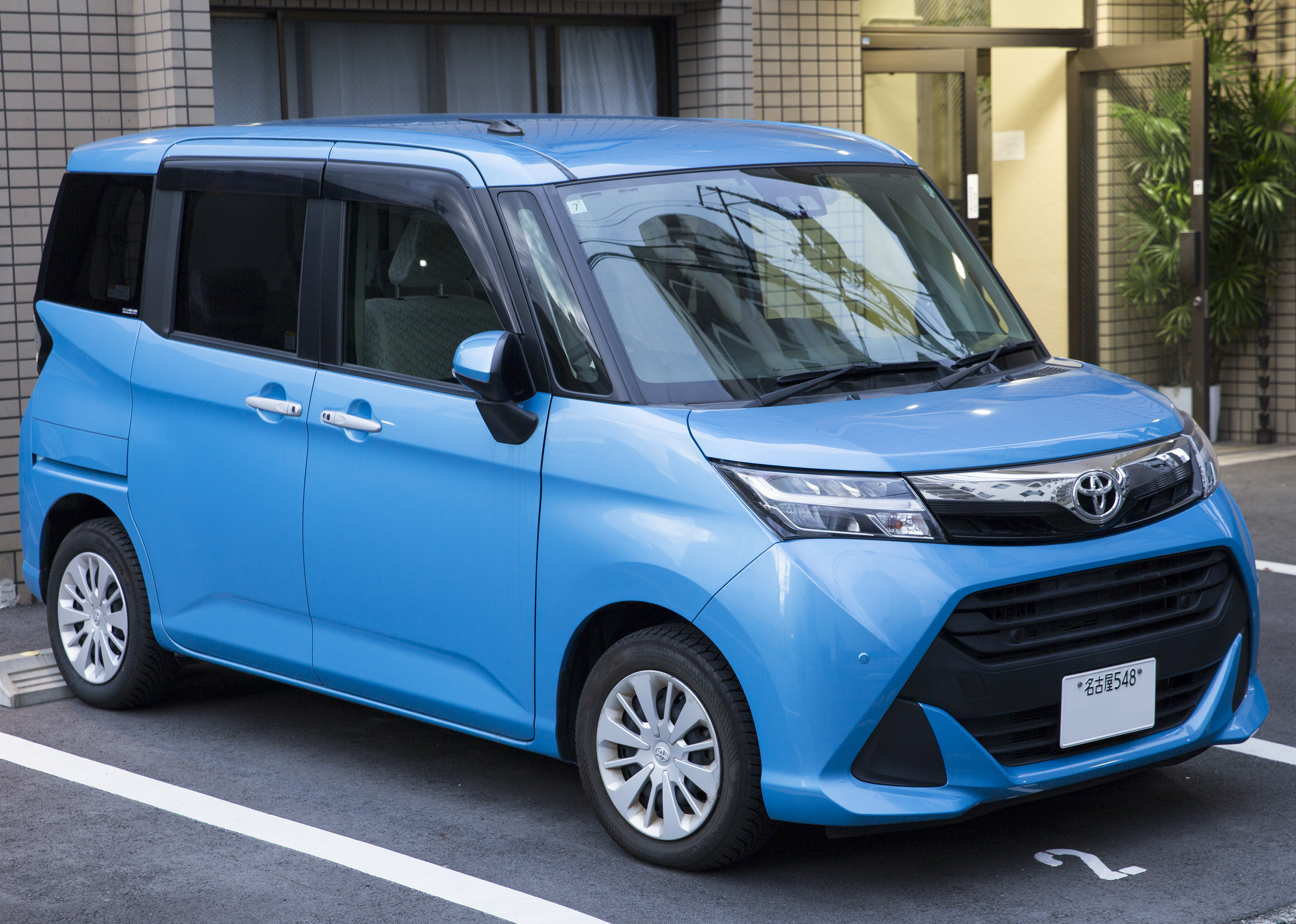
Toyota Tank G (M900A)

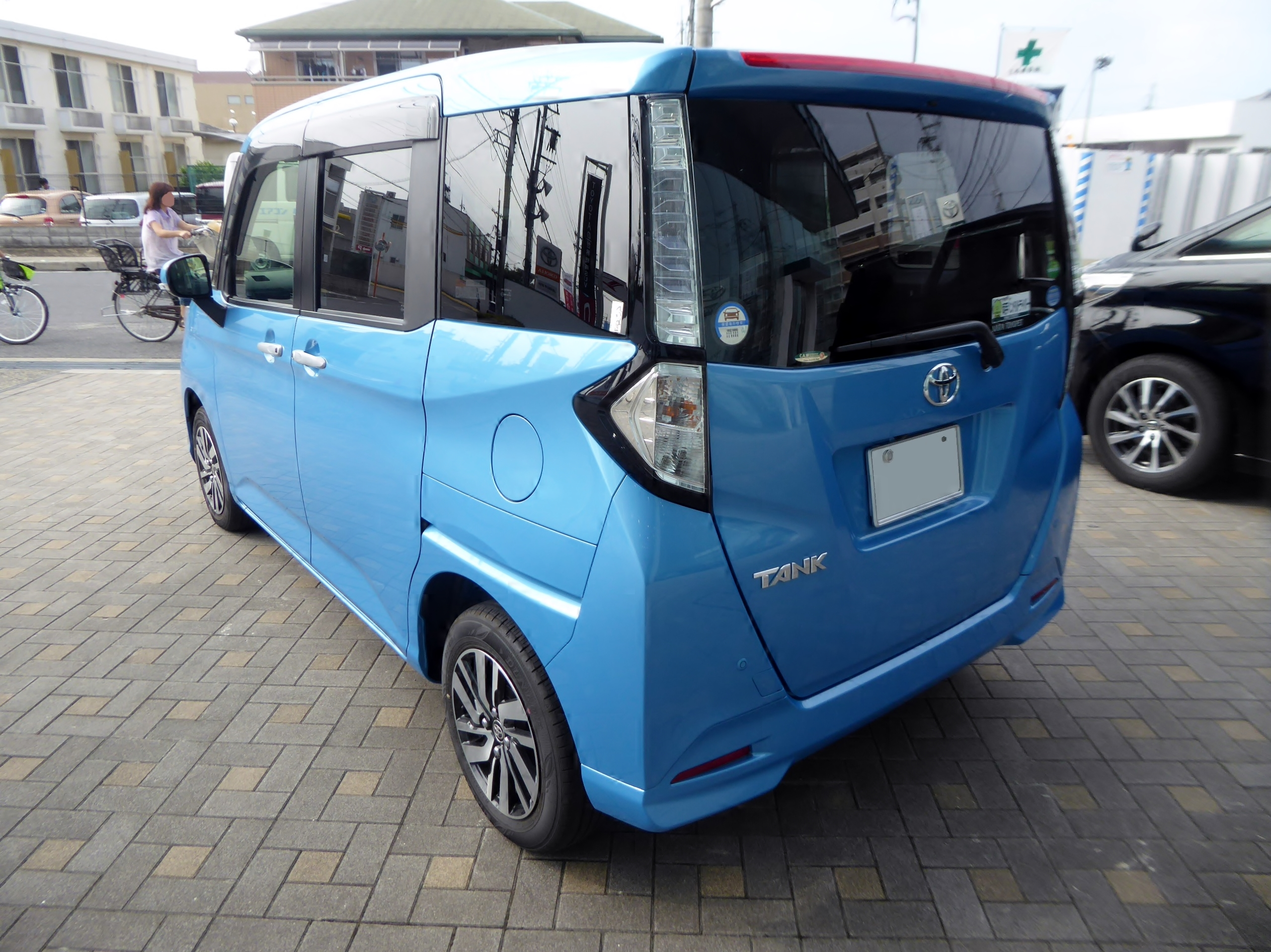
Tank G-T (M900A)

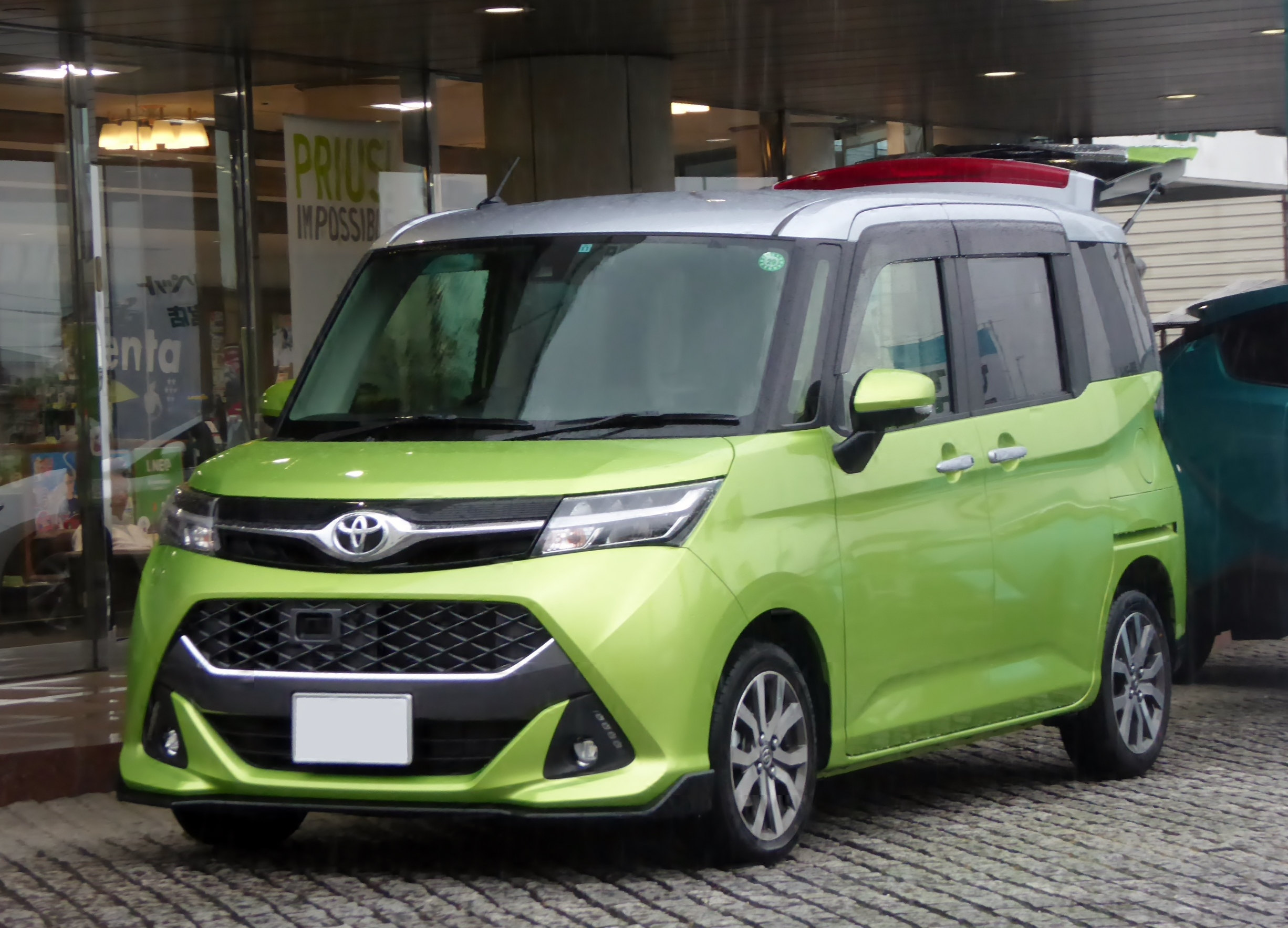
Tank Custom G-T (M900A)

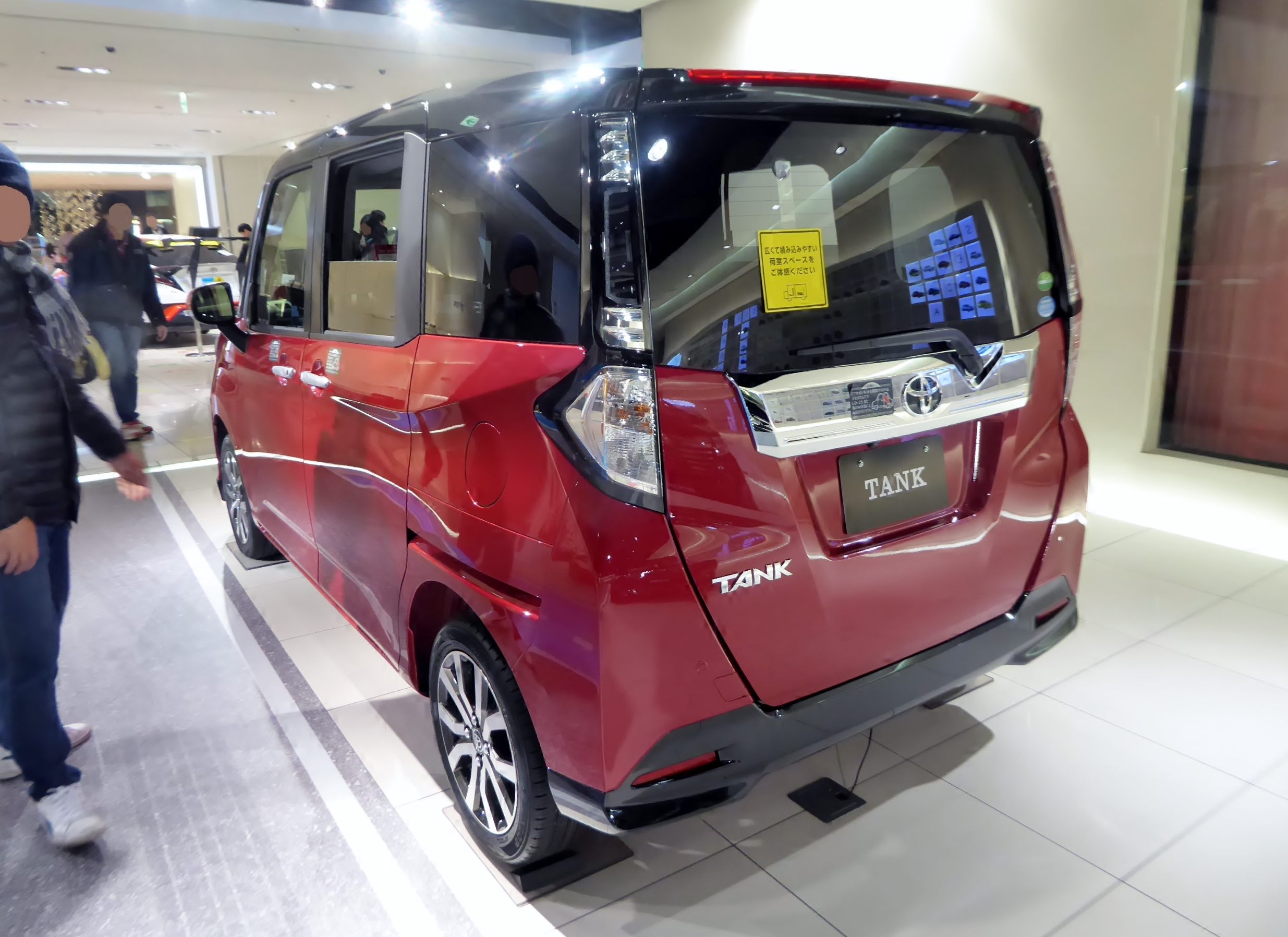
Tank Custom G-T (M900A)

Facelift

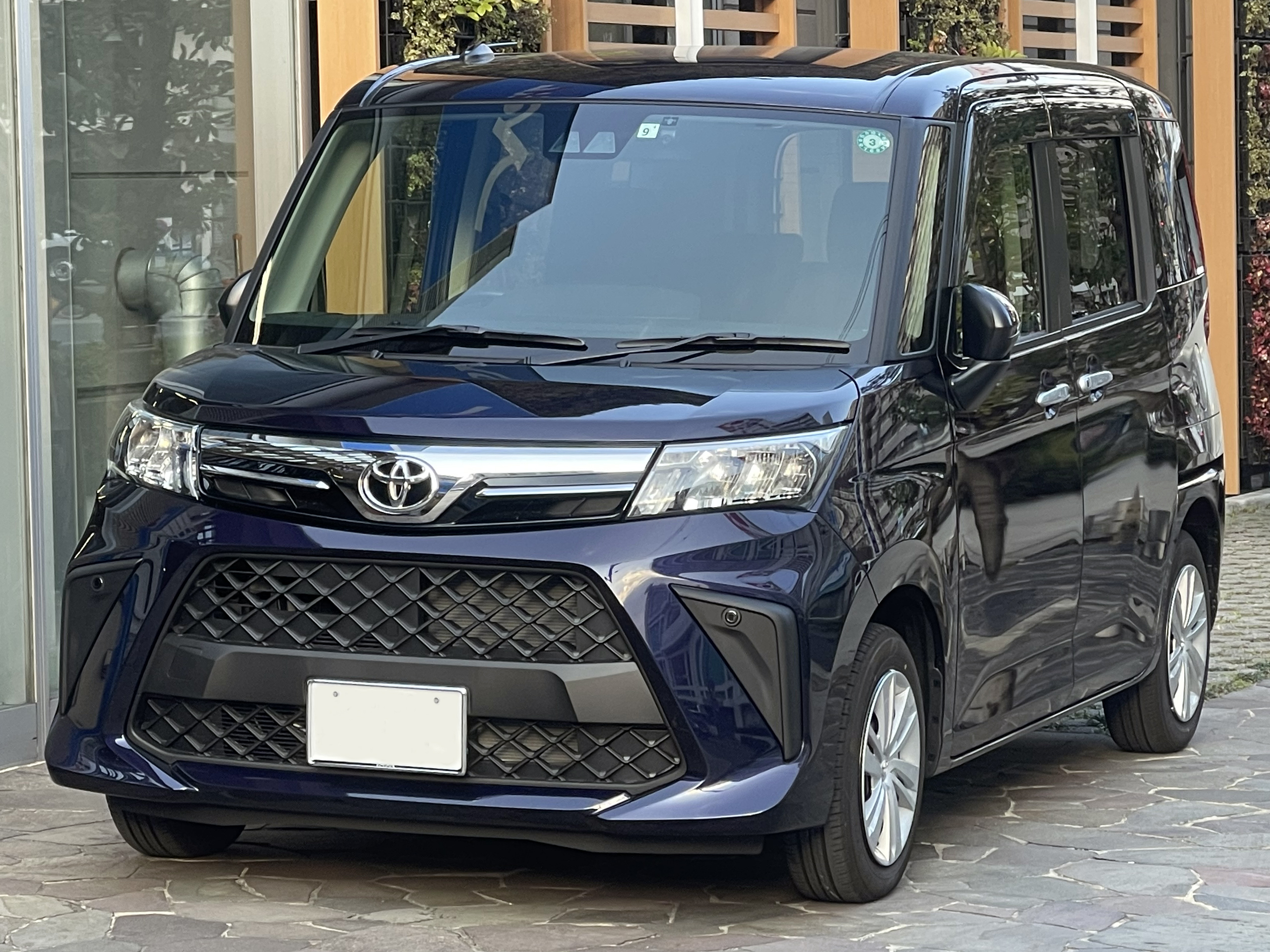
Roomy G 4WD (M910A)

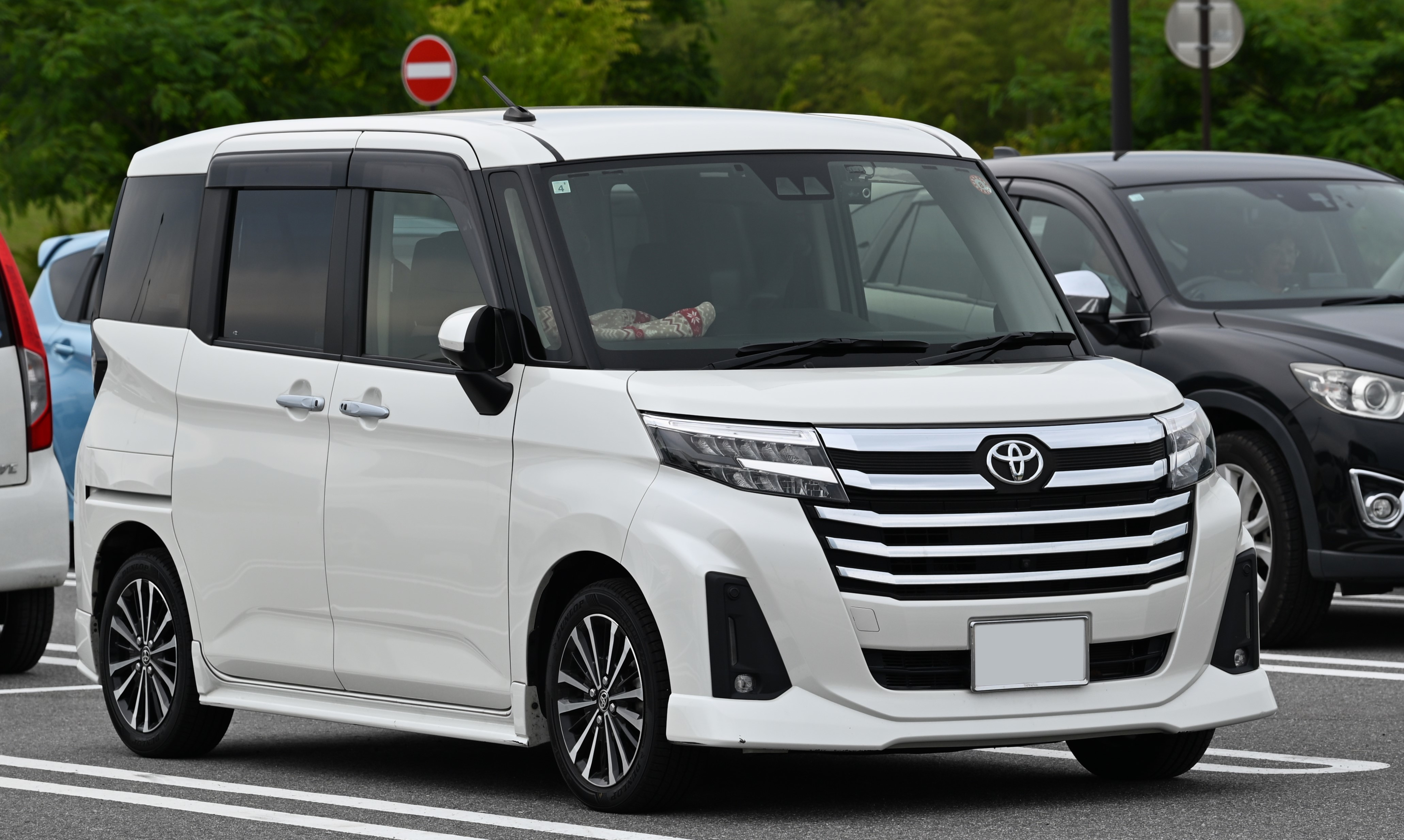
Roomy Custom G-T (M900A)

=== Justy ===
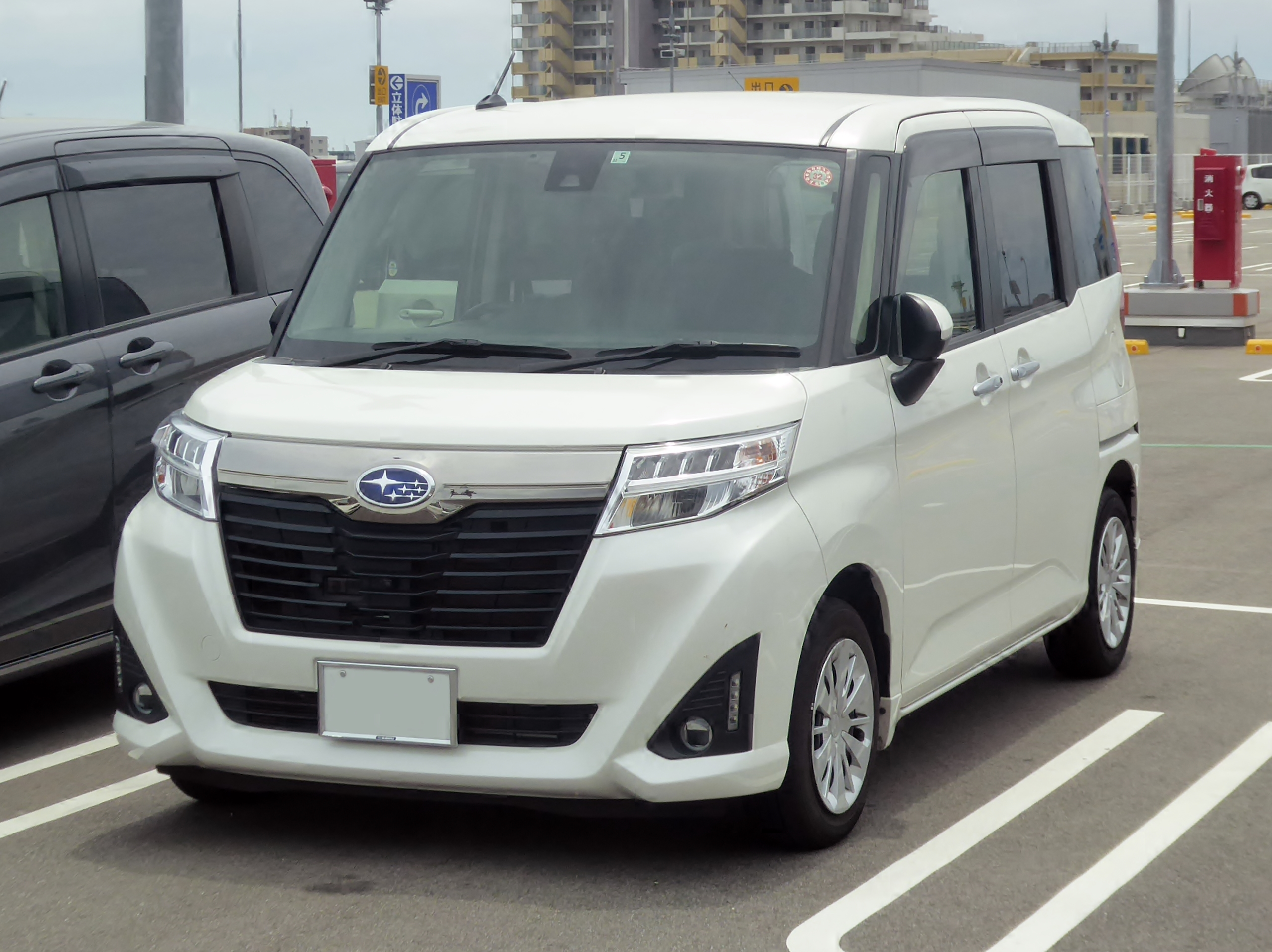
Subaru Justy GS SA (M900F; pre-facelift)

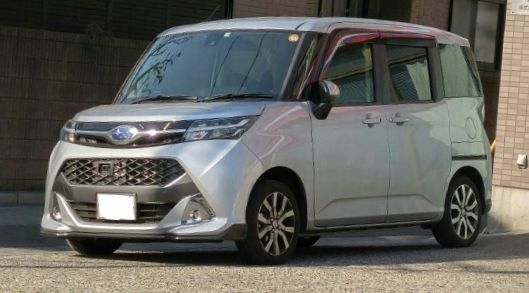
Justy Custom RS (M900F; pre-facelift)

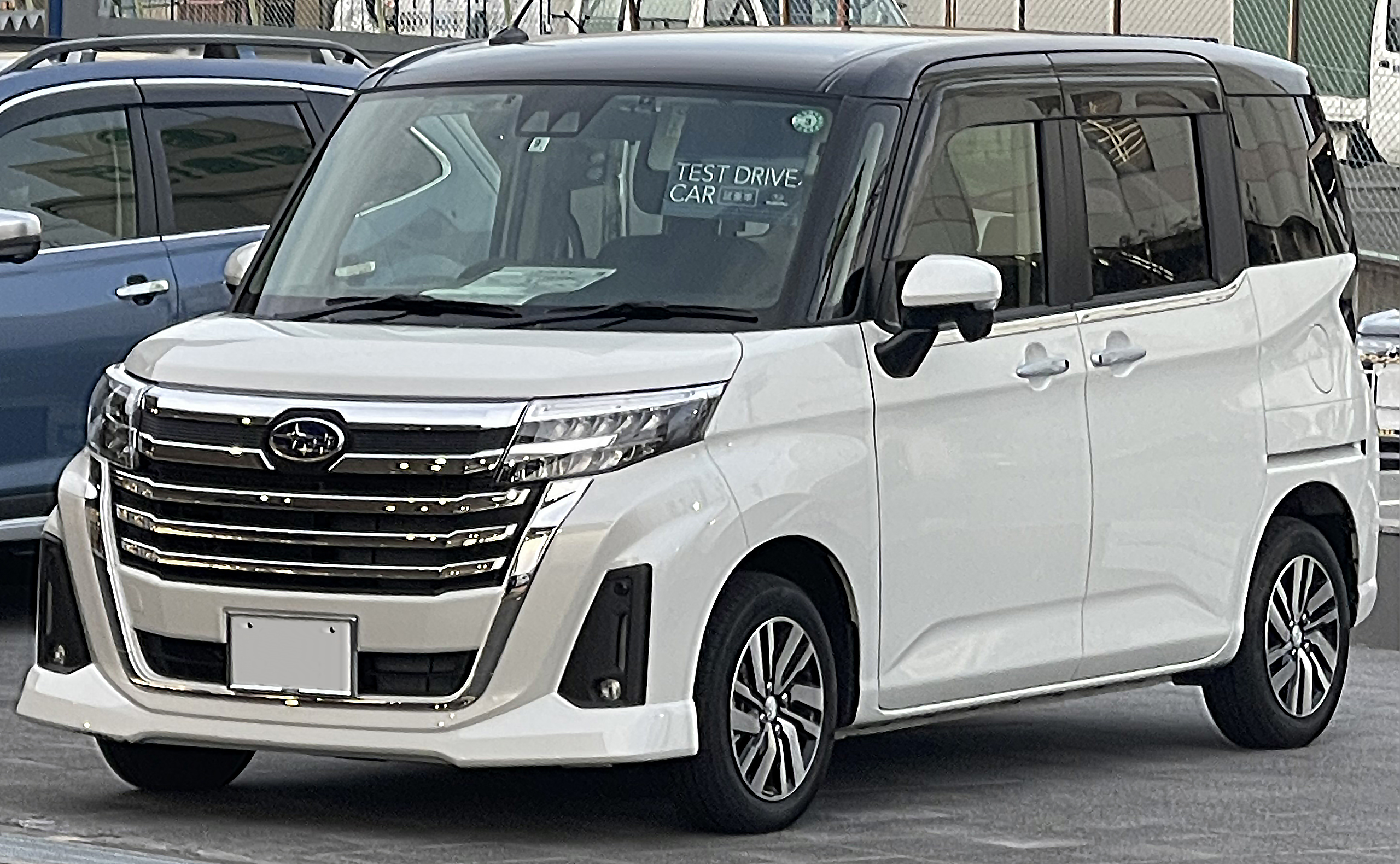
Justy (M900F; facelift)

== Sales ==
Year	Japan	
Year	Toyota Roomy	Daihatsu Thor
2016	8,675	
2017	78,690	
2018	86,265	25,982
2019	91,650	26,736
2020	87,242	1,325
2021	134,801	14,780
2022	109,236	11,527
2023	100,800	
2024	67,698	14,780
