= Toyota Sprinter Trueno =

Automobile produced by Toyota

- Toyota Sprinter Trueno liftback (AE86)

Overview
- Manufacturer: Toyota
- Also called: Toyota Corolla Levin
- Production: March 1972 – August 2000

Body and chassis
- Class: Sport compact; Hot hatch
- Body style: 2-door coupé (1972–1979 and 1983–2000); 2-door hardtop coupé (1974–1975); 3-door liftback (1979–1987)
- Layout: Front-engine, rear-wheel-drive (1972–1987); Front-engine, front-wheel-drive (1987–2000)

Chronology
- Predecessor: Toyota Corolla Sprinter
- Successor: Toyota Celica (T230) (integrated)

The Toyota Sprinter Trueno (トヨタ・スプリンタートレノ, Toyota Supurintā Toreno) is a series of compact sports coupés and liftbacks which were produced by Toyota from 1972 to 2000. The name trueno in Spanish means thunder. In Japan, the Sprinter Trueno was exclusive to Toyota Auto Store locations.

Its twin, the Toyota Corolla Levin (トヨタ・カローラレビン, Toyota Karōra Rebin), was produced in parallel with the Sprinter Trueno. In Middle English, levin means lightning. In Japan, the Corolla Levin was exclusive to Toyota Corolla Store locations.

== TE27 Series (1972–1974) ==
First generation
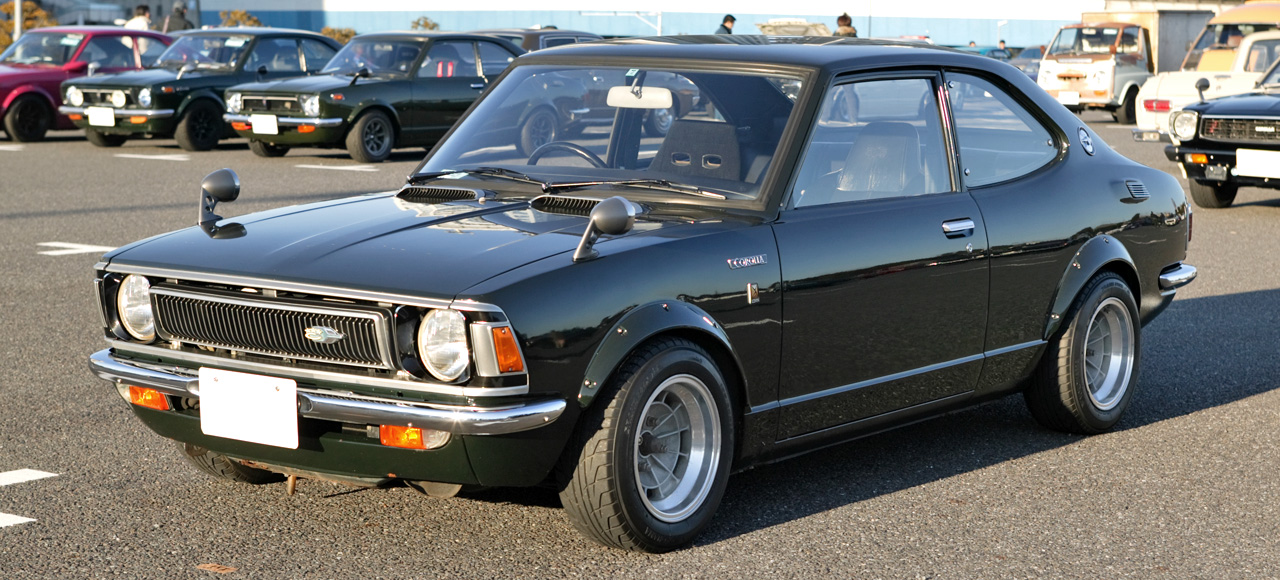
- Toyota Corolla Levin (TE27, pre-facelift)

Overview
- Model code: TE27
- Production: 1972–1974
- Assembly: Japan: Takaoka Plant, Toyota City

Body and chassis
- Body style: 2-door coupé
- Layout: Front engine, rear-wheel drive
- Related: Toyota Corolla (E20); Toyota Sprinter (E20); Daihatsu Charmant (A40)

Powertrain
- Engine: 1.6 L 2T-B/2T-BR OHV I4; 1.6 L 2T-G/2T-GR DOHC I4
- Transmission: 5-speed T50 manual

Dimensions
- Wheelbase: 2,335 mm (91.9 in)
- Length: 3,955–3,960 mm (155.7–155.9 in) (Corolla Levin); 3,965–3,970 mm (156.1–156.3 in) (Sprinter Trueno)
- Width: 1,505 mm (59.3 in)
- Height: 1,335 mm (52.6 in)
- Curb weight: 855–865 kg (1,885.0–1,907.0 lb)

The first-generation Sprinter Trueno and Corolla Levin were high-performance models of the Corolla and Sprinter 2-door fastback coupé, introduced in March 1972 as the top-level product. The inspiration for these compact sport coupés came from Toyota manager Geisuke Kubo who wanted to offer something similar to the Alfa Romeo Giulia Junior. The highest performance version of the twin coupés was powered by the high compression (9.8:1) 1.6 L DOHC 2T-G engine with twin double venturi side draft 40 mm Mikuni-Solex 40PHH carburettors and mated to a T50 5-speed manual transmission, borrowed from the bigger TA27 Celica 1600GT. This engine produced 115 PS (85 kW; 113 hp) gross, with claimed top speed of 190 km/h (118 mph) and able to complete a 1/4 mile (400 m) sprint in 16.3 seconds. A lower compression (8.8:1) 2T-GR engine option was also available for customers who preferred using cheaper, lower octane fuel. This engine was 5 PS (4 kW; 5 hp) less powerful, which also lowered the top speed to 185 km/h (115 mph) and quarter mile time to 16.7 seconds.

An updated model appeared shortly in August in the same year with the refreshed appearance. Another update was introduced in April 1973 with the introduction of less powerful model called J (Junior), powered by an OHV twin carburettor version of the 2T-G engine called the 2T-B/BR, shared with the lower priced Corolla/Sprinter 1600 SR coupé. These engines produced 100–105 PS (74–77 kW; 99–104 hp) in gross power, with claimed a top speed of 170–175 km/h (106–109 mph) and a quarter mile time of over 17 seconds. Vehicles installed with the 1.6 L engine obligated Japanese owners to pay more annual road tax, as the displacement exceeds the 1.0–1.5 L tax bracket.

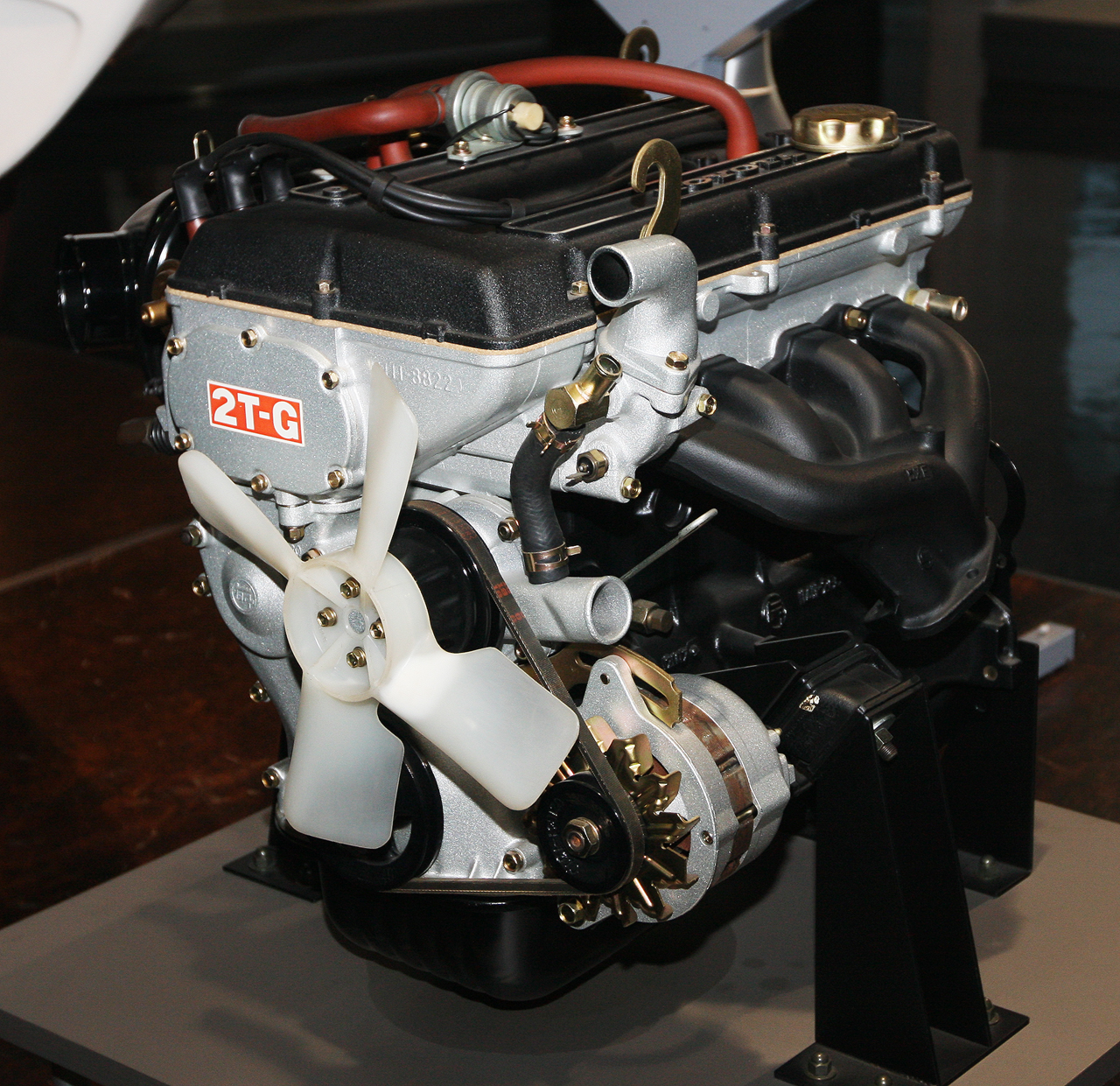
The 2T-G DOHC 8-valve engine,, developed by Yamaha based on the 2T OHV engine

Corolla Levin

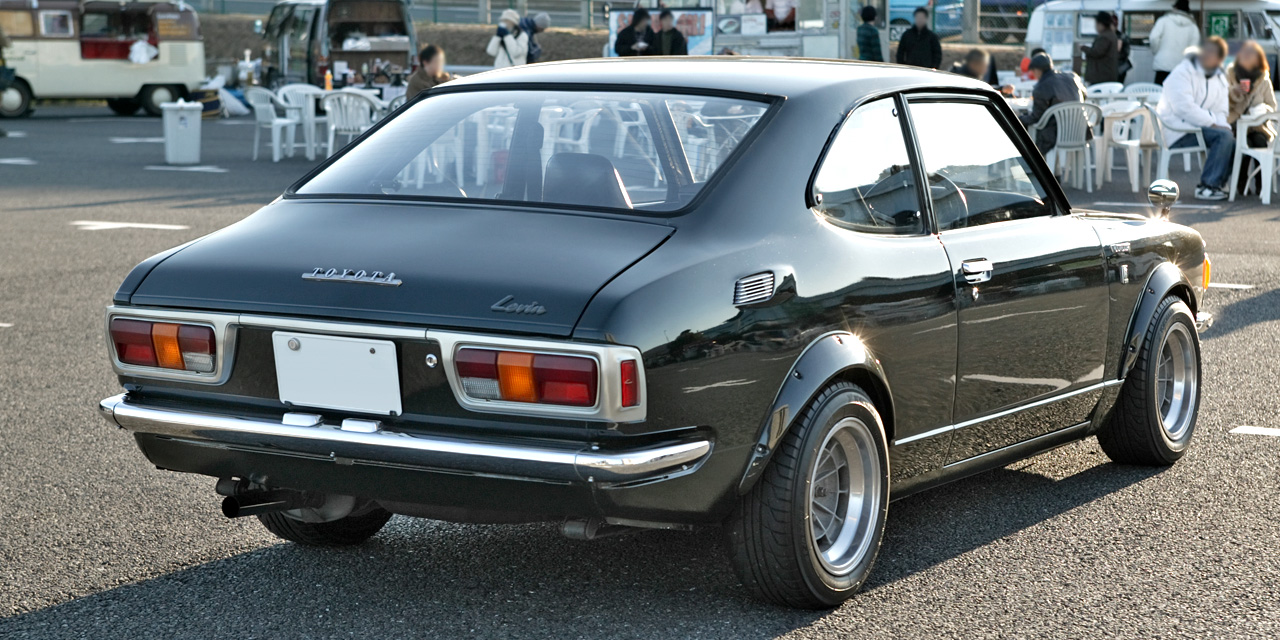
Corolla Levin (TE27, pre-facelift)

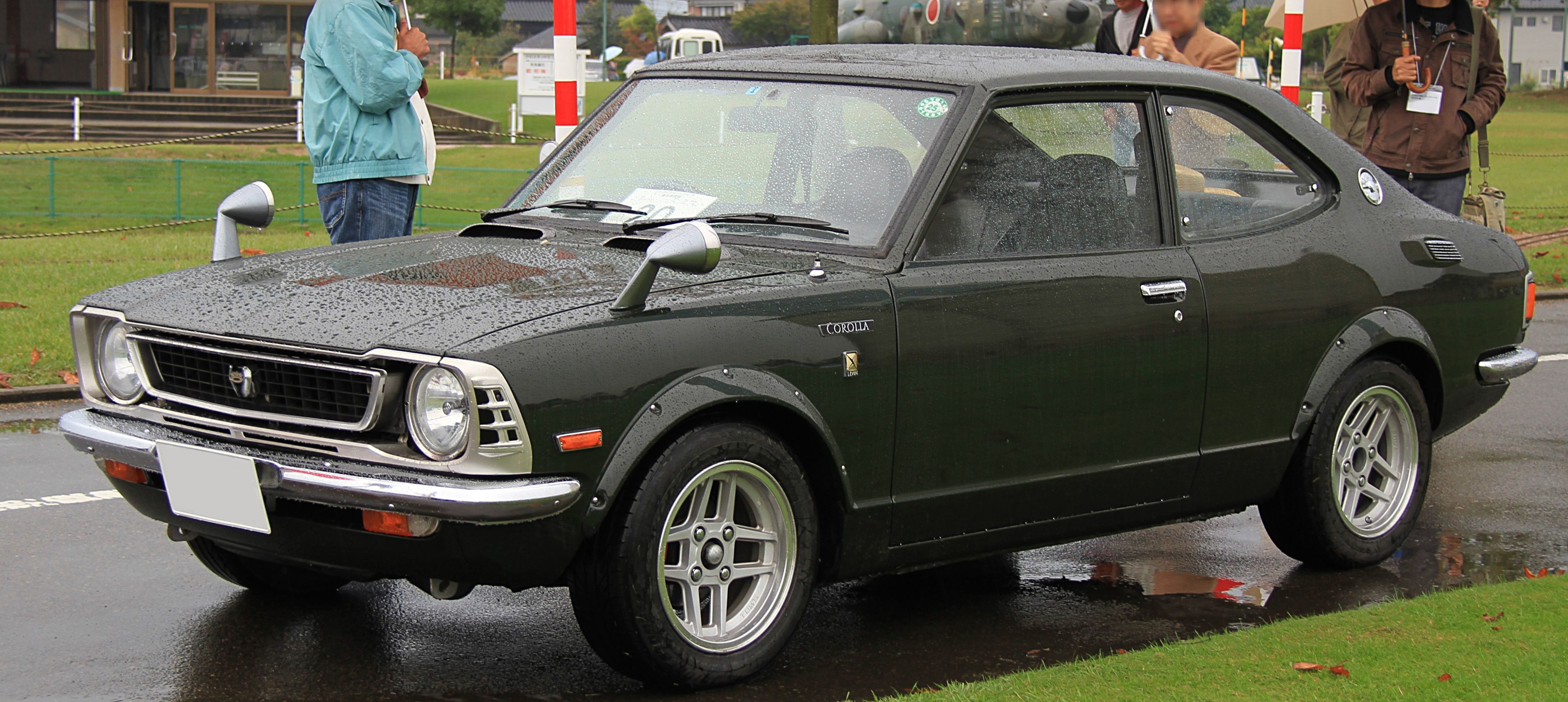
Corolla Levin (TE27, facelift)

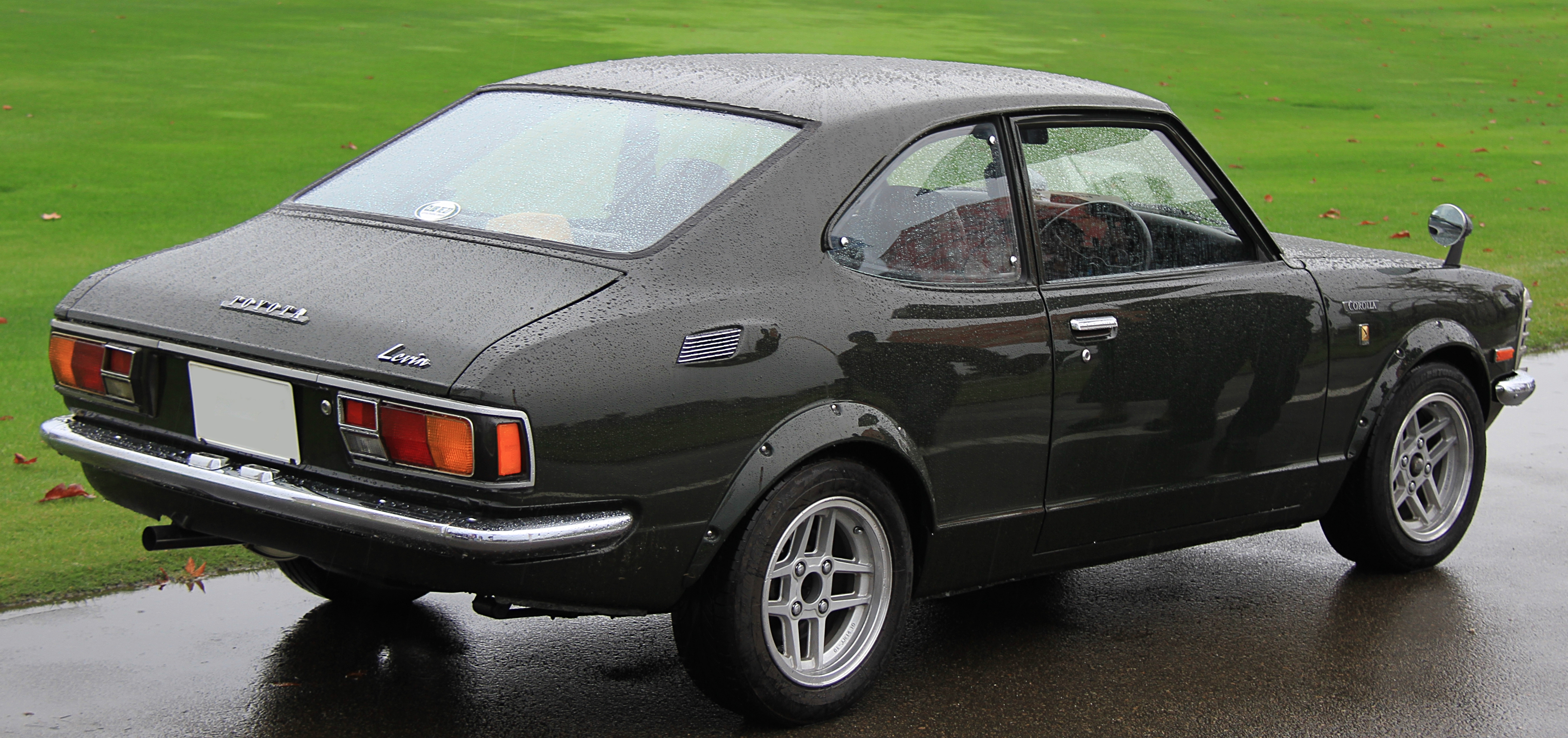
Corolla Levin (TE27, facelift)
Sprinter Trueno

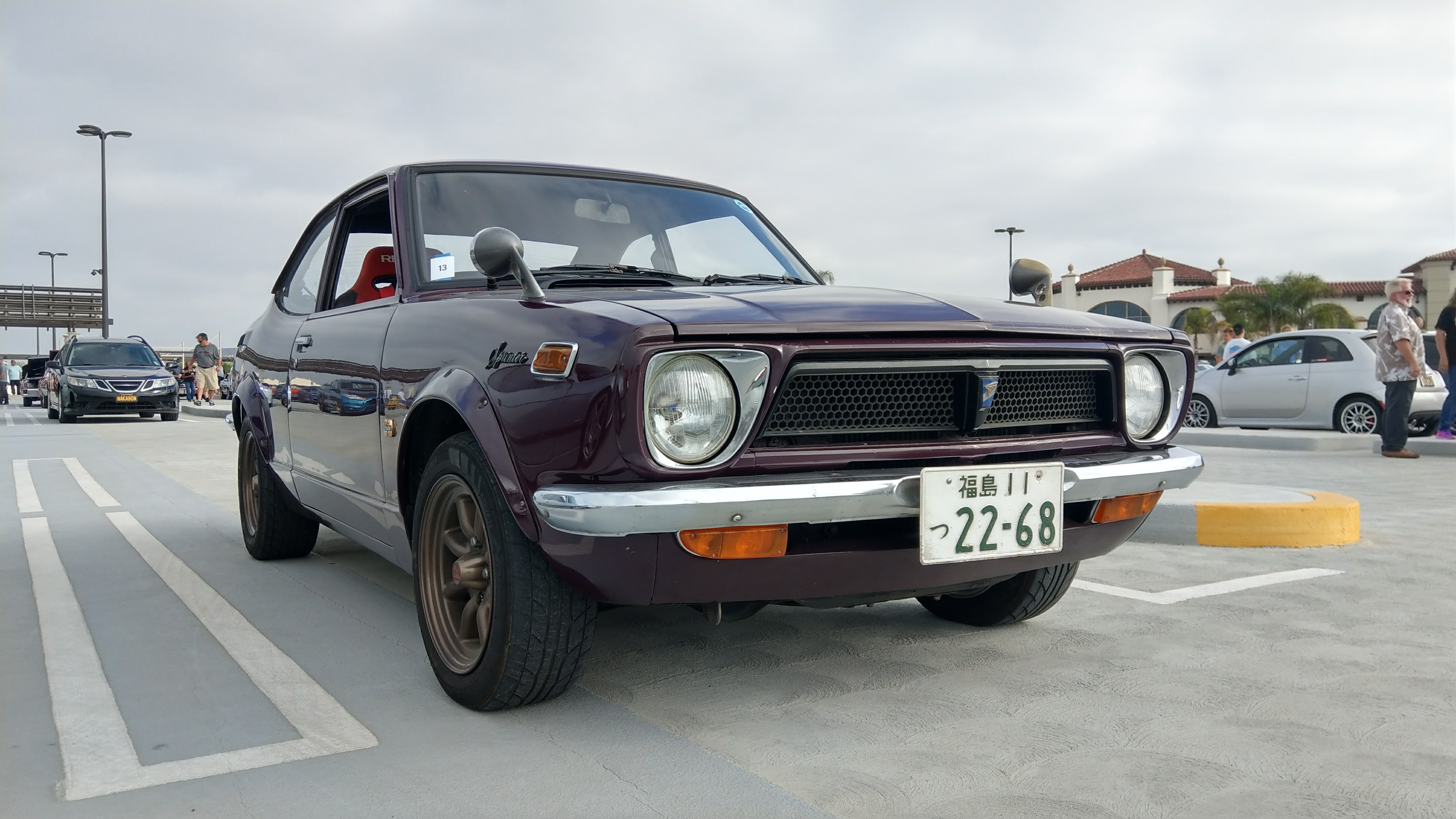
Sprinter Trueno (TE27, facelift)

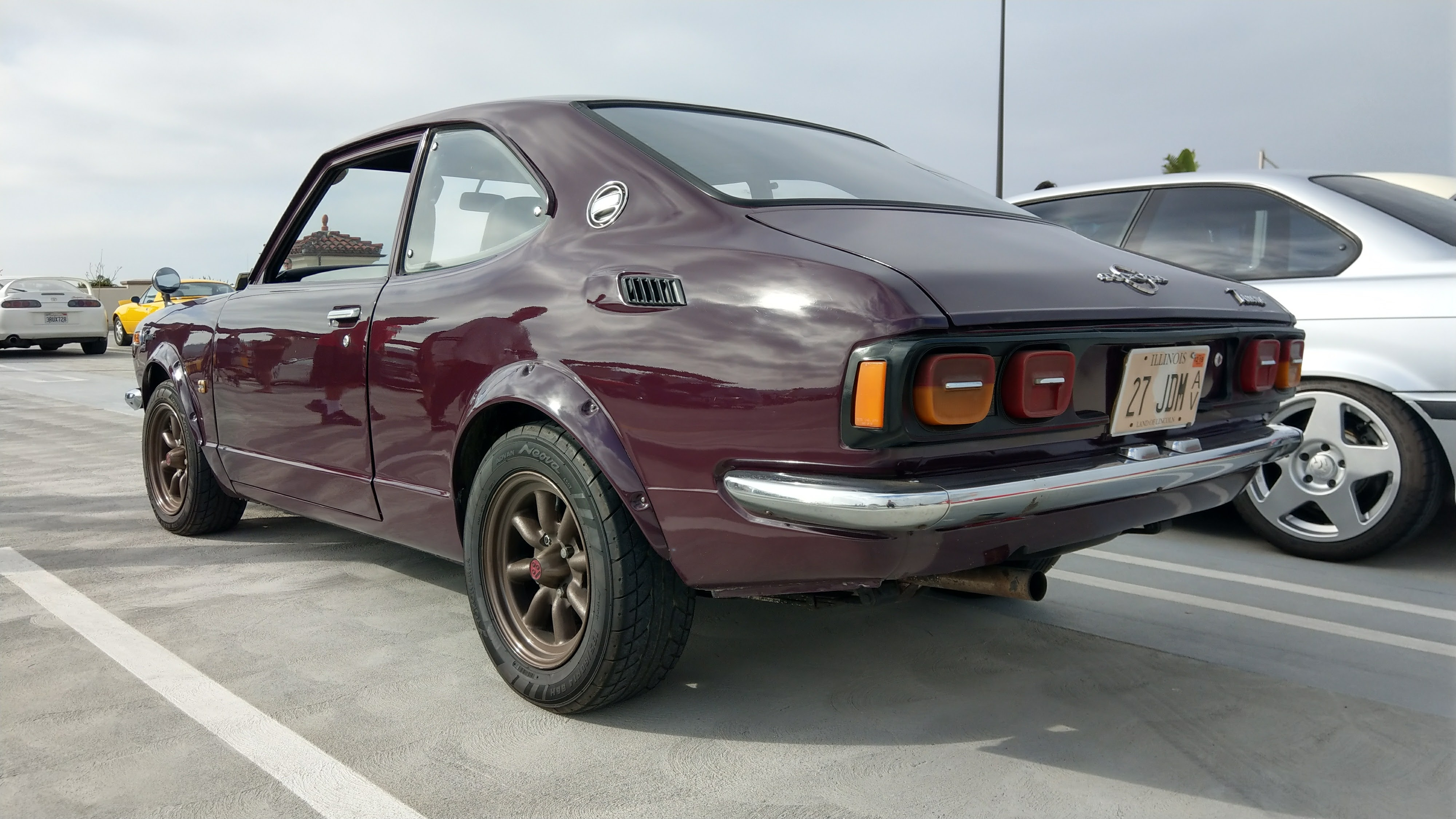
Sprinter Trueno (TE27, facelift)

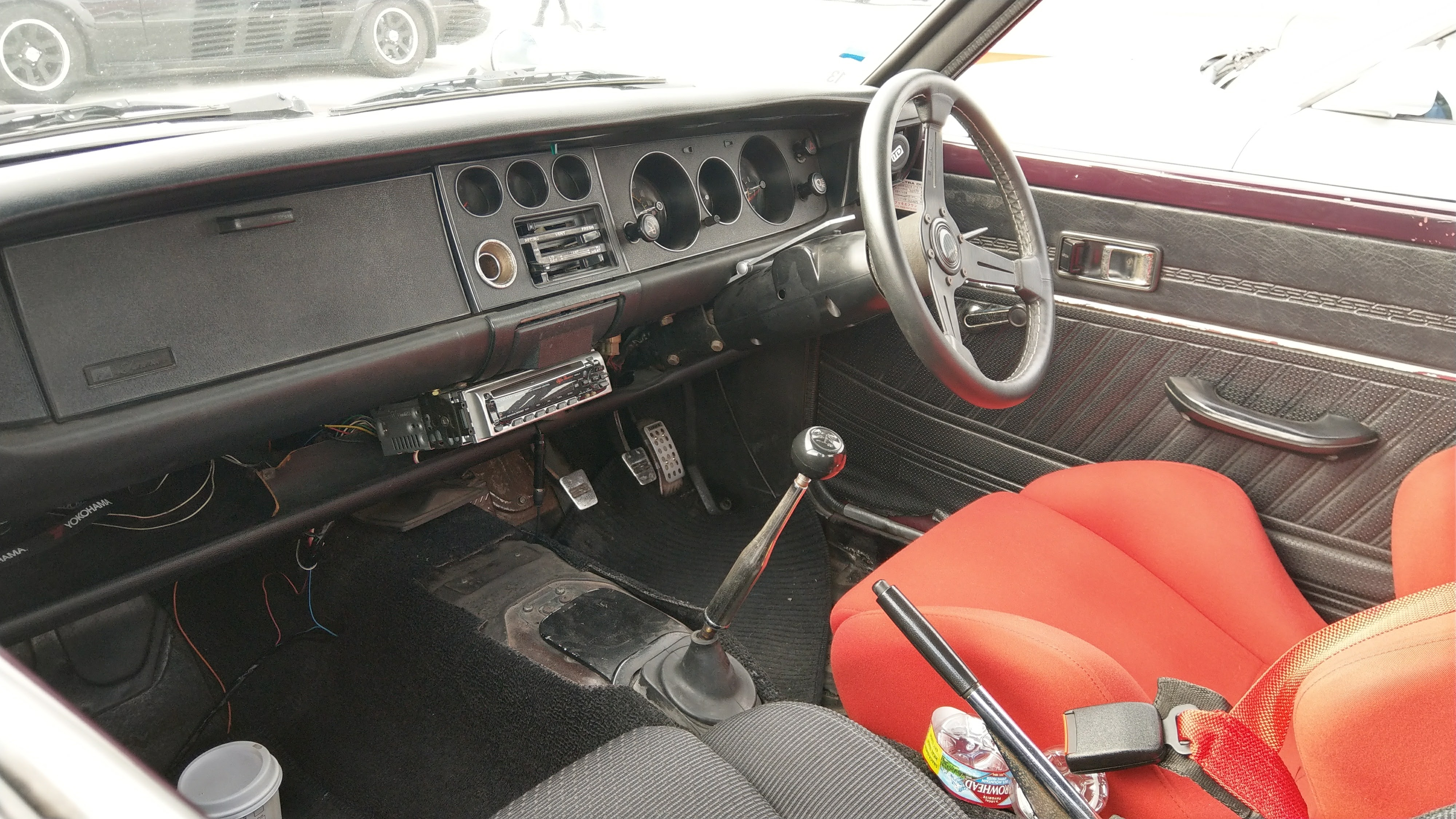
Sprinter Trueno interior

== TE37, TE47, TE51, TE55, TE61 & TE65 Series (1974–1975, 1977–1979) ==
Second generation
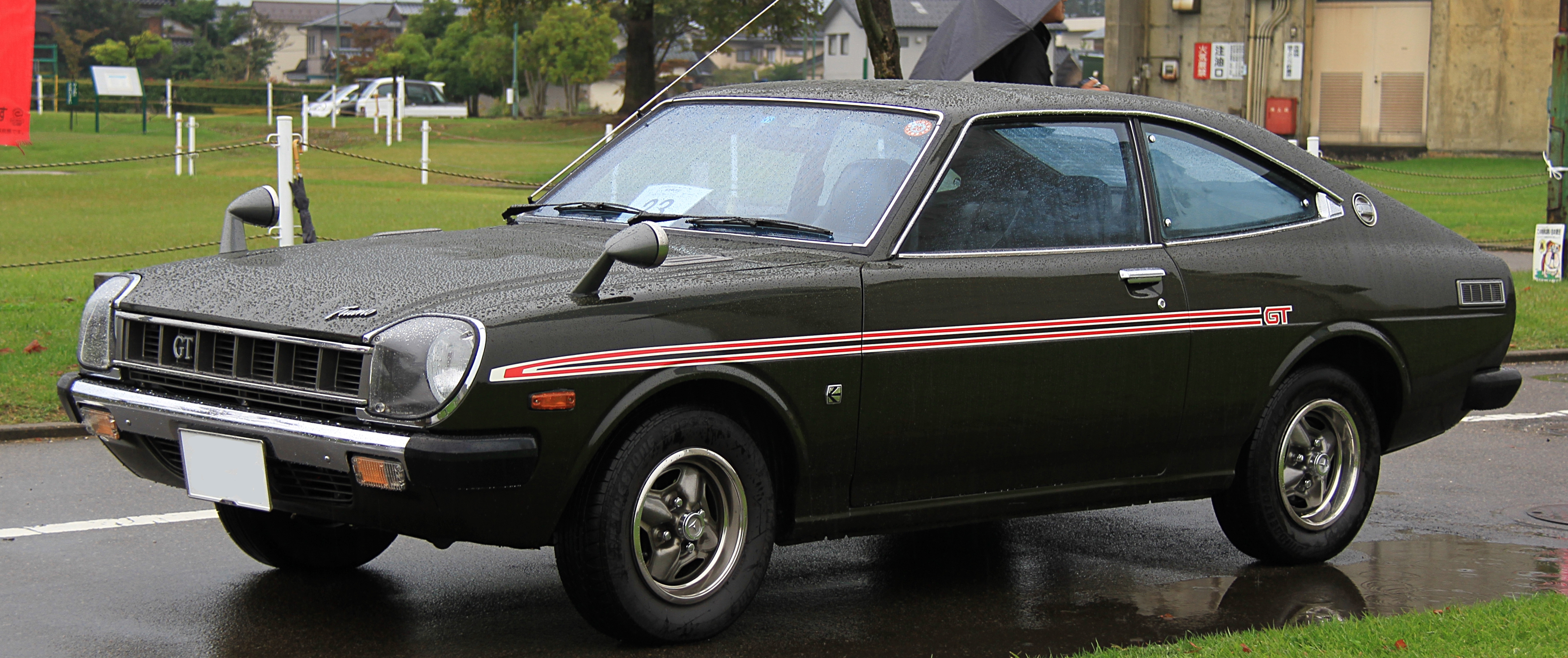
- Toyota Sprinter Trueno GT (TE47, pre-facelift)

Overview
- Model code: TE47/61/65 (Sprinter Trueno); TE37/51/55 (Corolla Levin)
- Production: 1974–1975; 1977–1979
- Assembly: Japan: Takaoka Plant, Toyota City; Japan: Susono, Shizuoka (Kanto Auto Works)

Body and chassis
- Body style: 2-door coupé 2-door hardtop coupé (TE37 Corolla Levin only)
- Layout: Front engine, rear-wheel drive
- Related: Toyota Corolla (E30/50); Toyota Sprinter (E40/60)

Powertrain
- Engine: 1.6 L 2T/2T-B OHV I4; 1.6 L 2T-G/2T-GR/2T-GEU DOHC I4
- Transmission: 4-speed T40 manual; 5-speed T50 manual

Dimensions
- Wheelbase: 2,370 mm (93.3 in)
- Length: 3,995 mm (157.3 in) (TE37 Corolla Levin); 4,070 mm (160.2 in); 4,245 mm (167.1 in) (with impact-absorbing bumpers)
- Width: 1,570 mm (61.8 in) (TE37 Corolla Levin); 1,600–1,615 mm (63.0–63.6 in)
- Height: 1,300–1,310 mm (51.2–51.6 in); 1,340 mm (52.8 in) (TE37 Corolla Levin)
- Curb weight: 925–965 kg (2,039.3–2,127.5 lb)

With the introduction of the second generation Sprinter Trueno and Corolla Levin in April 1974, there was a clearer difference between the two through design. Though based on the same platform, the whole design differed totally with the Sprinter Trueno (TE47) was offered as a coupé and had a sleeker and more curved design. In contrast to the Corolla Levin (TE37), it was only available as a hardtop coupé with an aggressive forward raked nose design similar to the 1400/1600 sedans. Both models were still powered by the same 2T-G/GR engines and mated to the same T50 5-speed manual transmission. The twins was also available with a better equipped GT sub-trim. Due the incompatibility with the Japanese emission regulations, the coupés were discontinued in November 1975.

Toyota reintroduced the twin coupés in January 1977 with a minor facelift and also the new fuel injected version of the 2T-G engine with the Toyota Total Clean-Catalyst (TTC-C) emission control technology, with the installation of catalytic converter to pass the Japanese 1976 emission regulation, now called the 2T-GEU.The Sprinter was no longer the top-level product when the Chaser coupé was introduced at Toyota Vista Stores, and the Celica XX became the top level car at Toyota Corolla Stores, replacing the Corolla Levin. The Corolla Levin (TE51) shared the coupé body style of the Sprinter Trueno (TE61), but with a drastic difference in the nose. Also in this facelift, the North American market low speed impact-absorbing bumpers were also added as an option. In September 1977, Toyota launched a limited edition called Black Trueno, based on the GT trim and limited to 550 units (together with 1000 units of the T120 series Corona Black Limited Edition sedan/coupé, to celebrate its 20th anniversary). Two months later in November, the Levin GT received the same limited edition and available for 1000 units. This limited edition was only offered in black coloured body, special brown mats and body decals, "Limited Edition 550 or 1000" mark on the body, a plate with the owner's name engraved on it placed above the glove box and a black mug for the Levin. A similar limited-edition model was offered in 1986 as the facelifted AE86 Sprinter Trueno Black Limited liftback. Another facelift was introduced in April 1978 with the new front grille and low-speed impact-absorbing bumpers and the advanced TTC-C with three-way catalytic converter because of the stricken emission regulation. The Corolla Levin and Sprinter Trueno now bearing TE55 and TE65 codes, respectively.

The TE47 Sprinter Trueno was exported in limited numbers to select markets in Europe (such as Belgium, Canary Islands and Luxembourg) and Asia-Pacific (general specification), while the rest of the world received the regular Corolla hardtop coupé version. It was marketed with three trim levels; LT with the plain 2T engine and 4-speed T40 manual transmission, ST with the twin carburettors 2T-B engine and 5-speed T50 manual transmission and the GT which used the same powertrain as the Japanese-spec Sprinter Trueno.

Sprinter Trueno

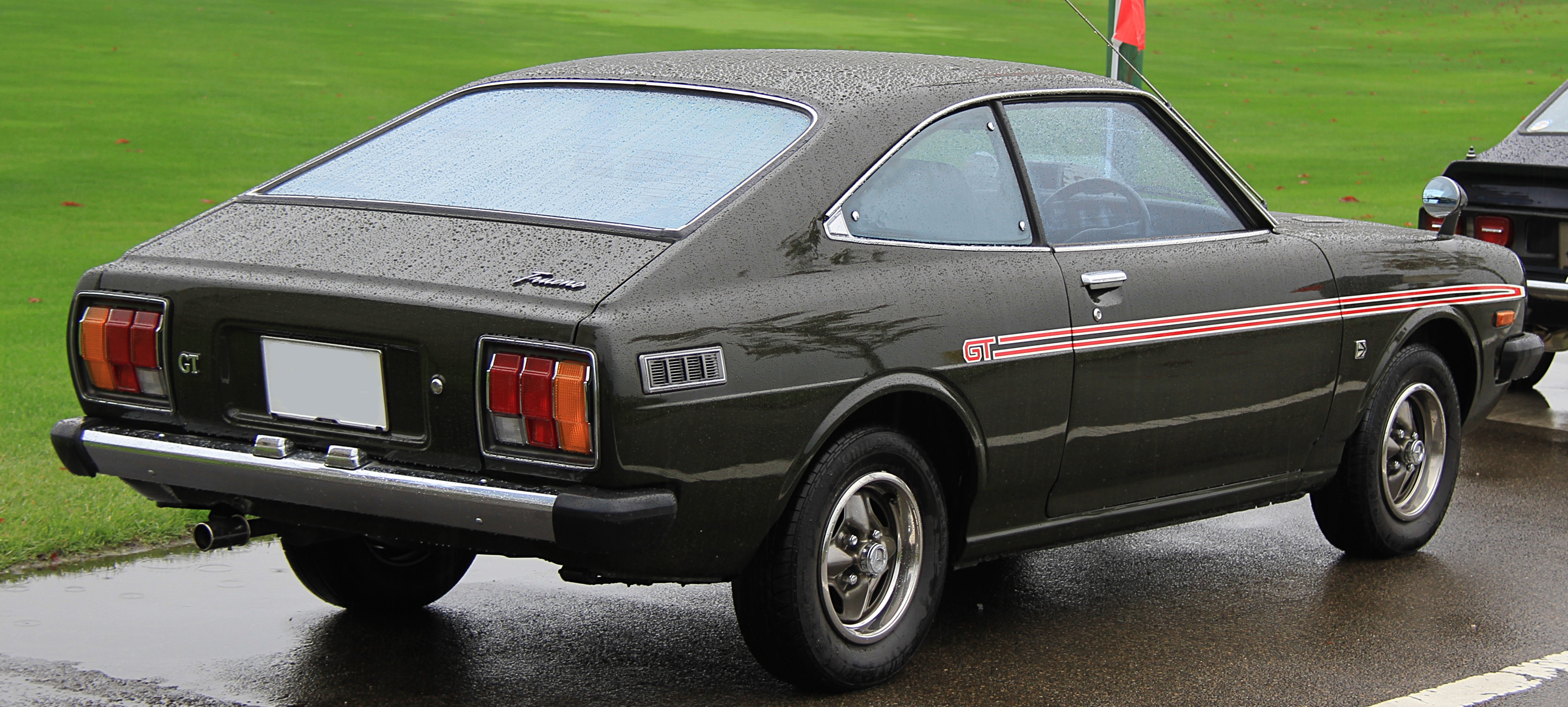
Rear view of Sprinter Trueno GT (TE47, pre-facelift)

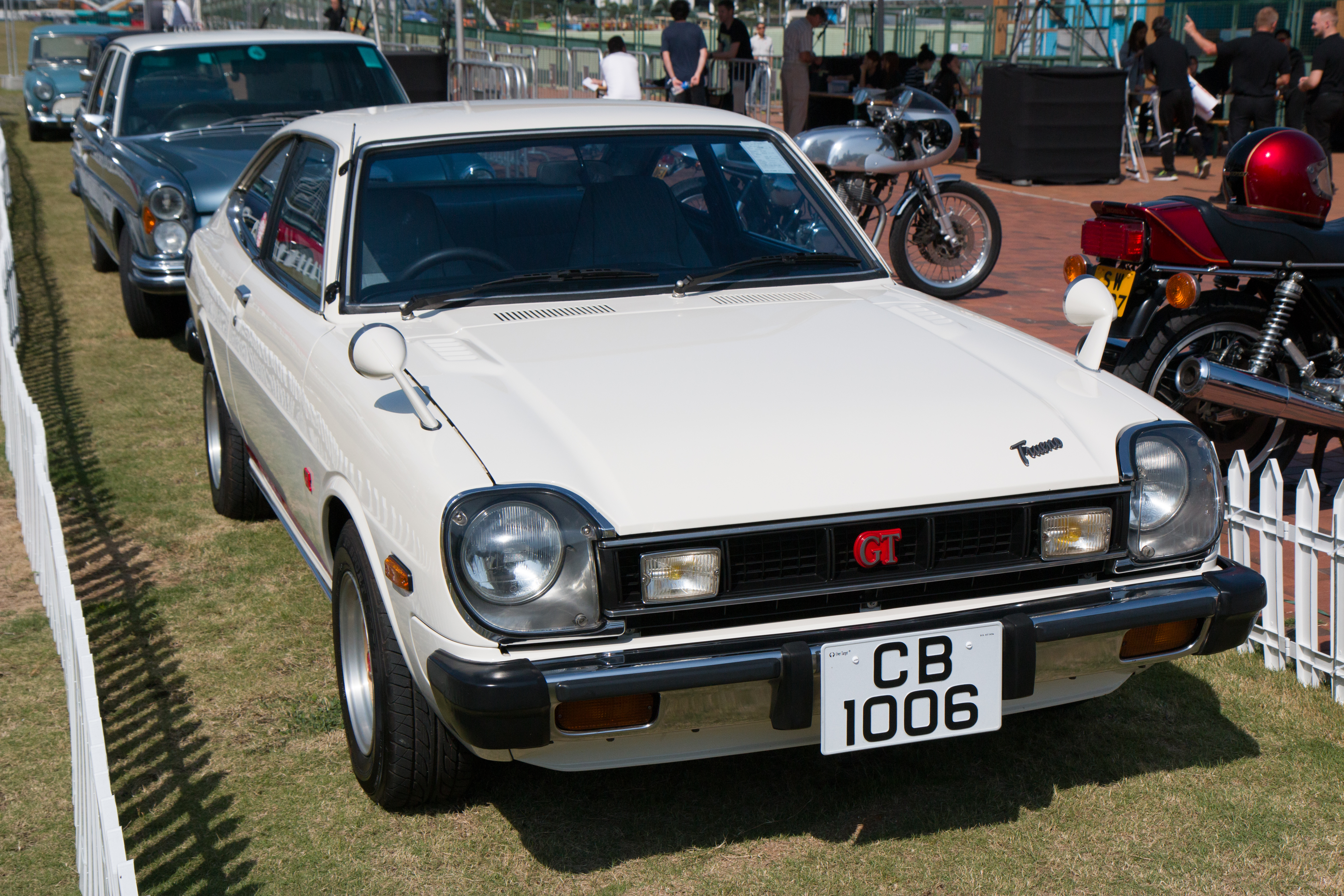
Sprinter Trueno GT (TE61, first facelift)

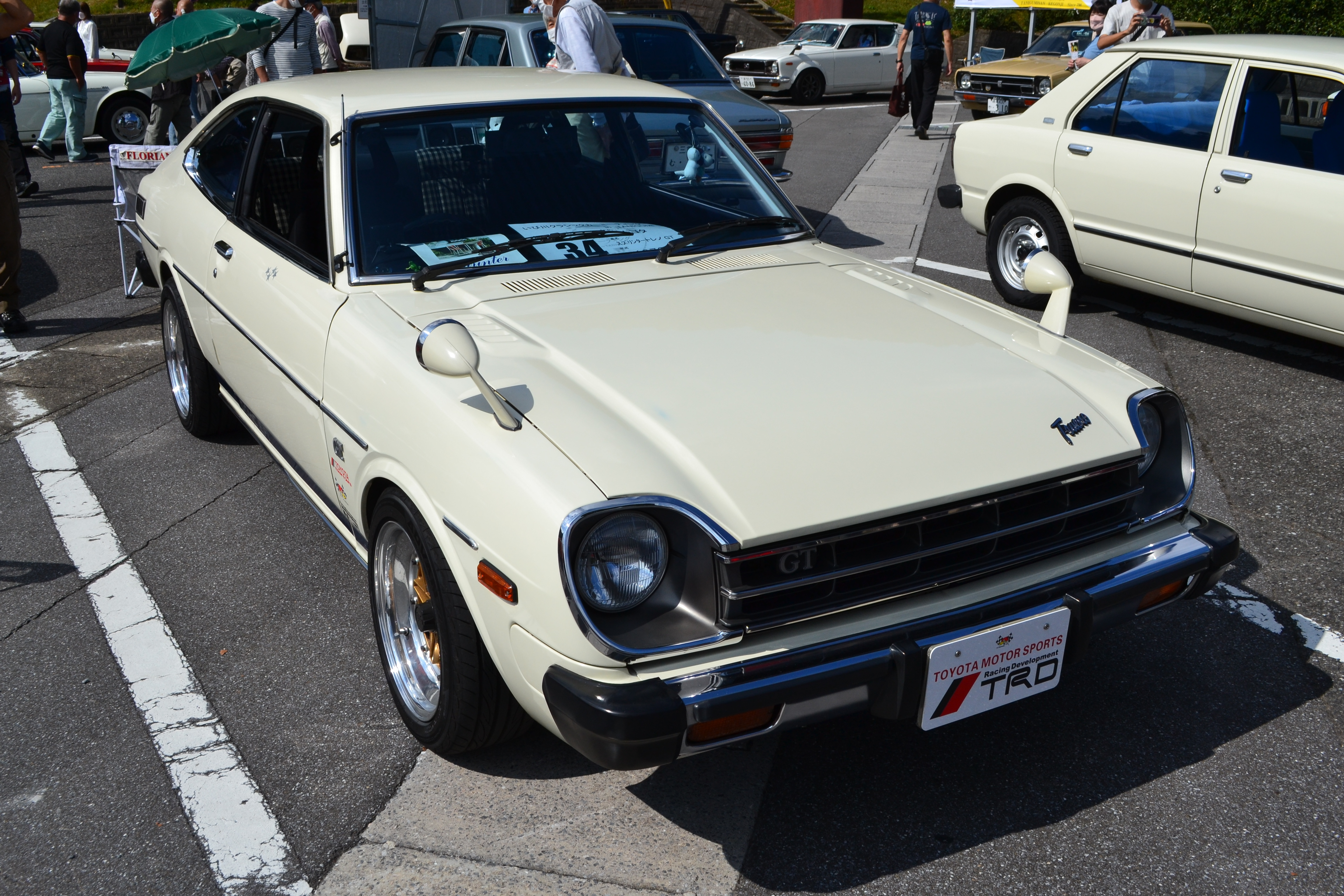
Sprinter Trueno GT (TE65, second facelift)

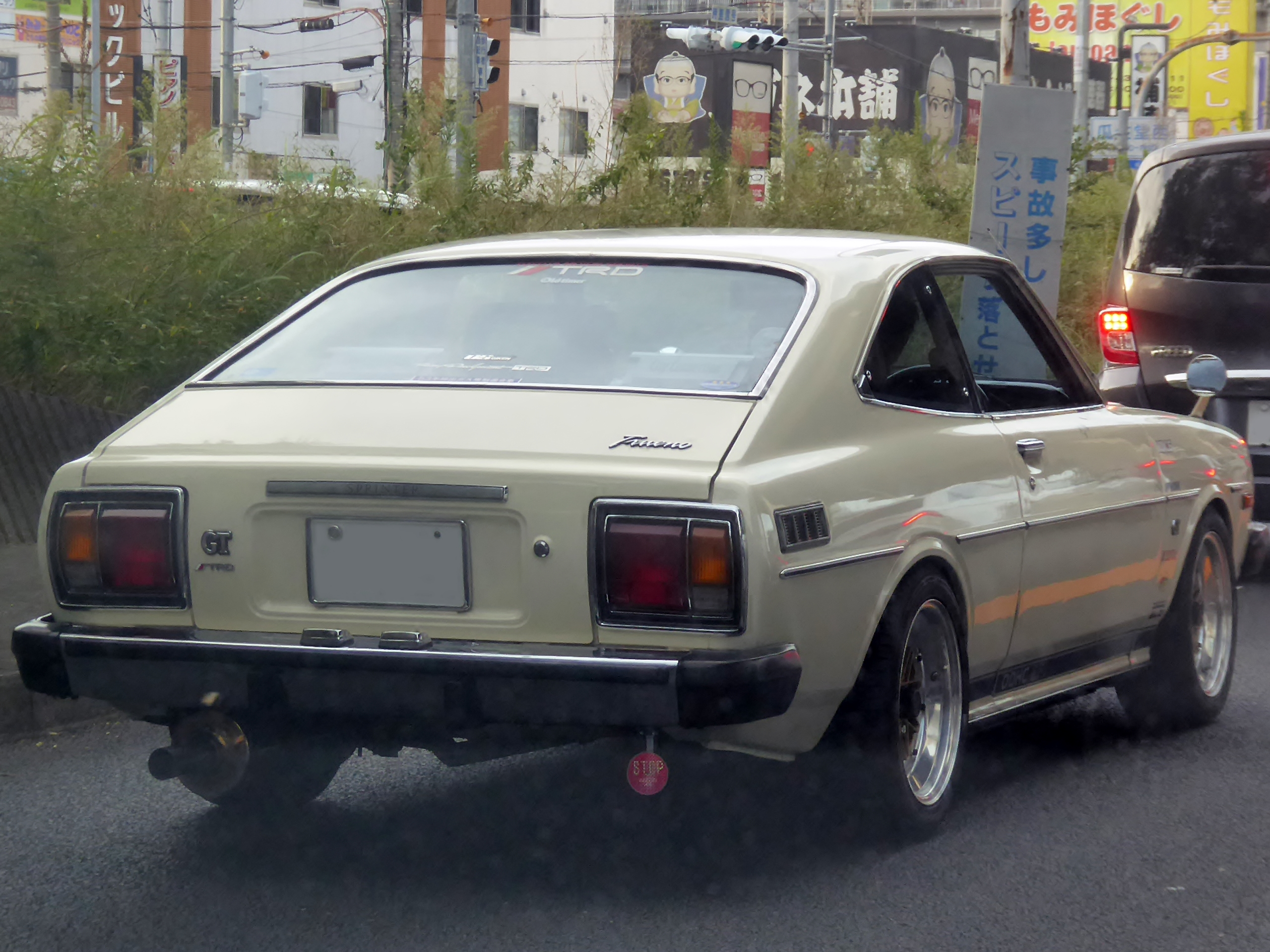
Rear view of Sprinter Trueno GT (TE61/65, facelift)

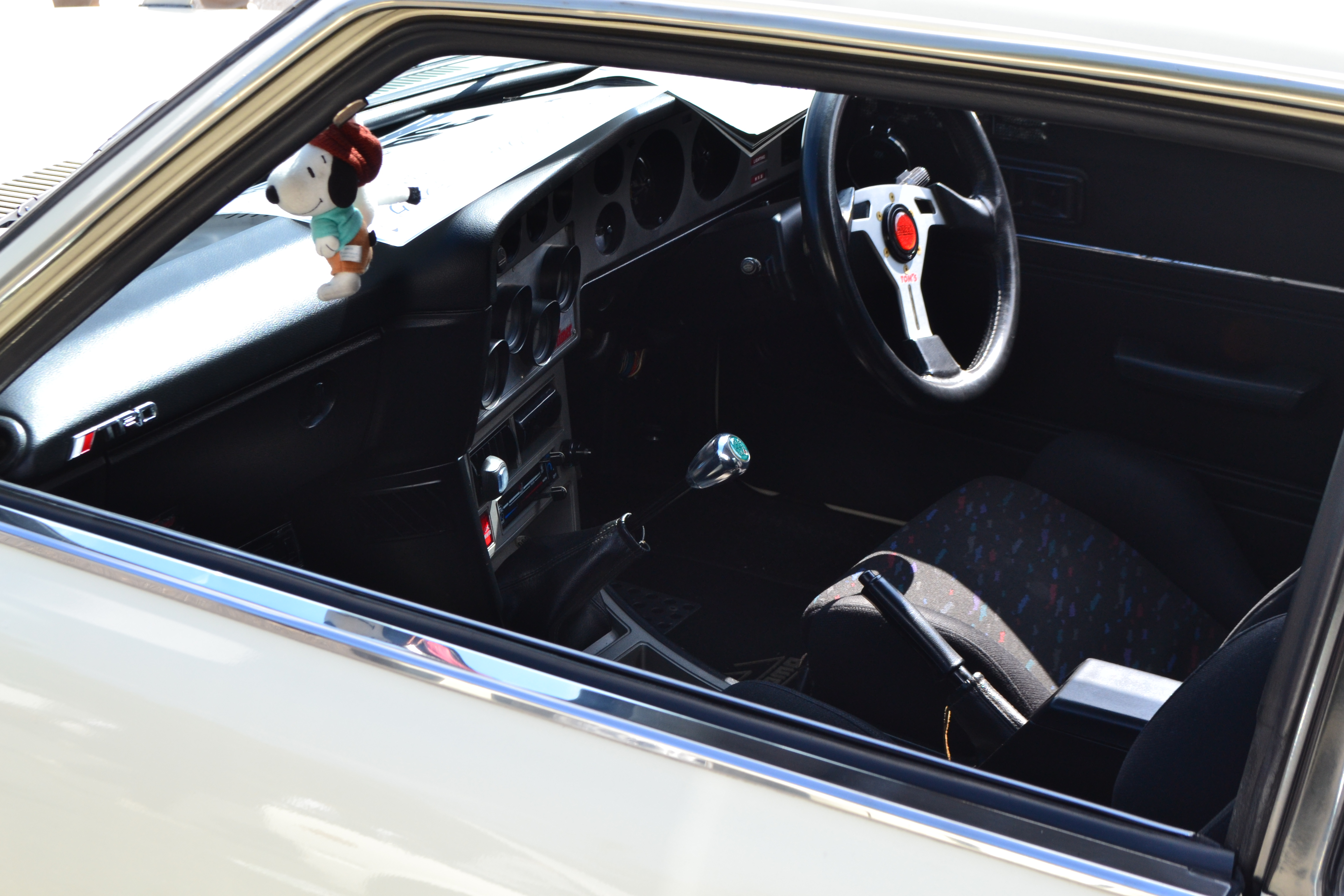
Sprinter Trueno GT Interior
Corolla Levin

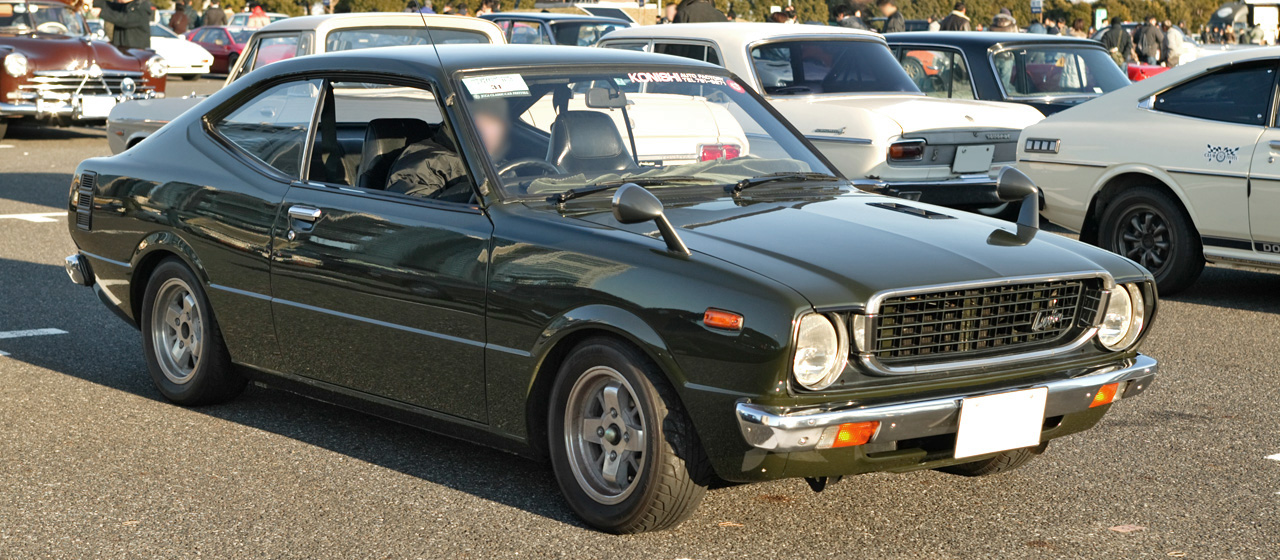
Corolla Levin (TE37), the only model offered with hardtop coupé body style

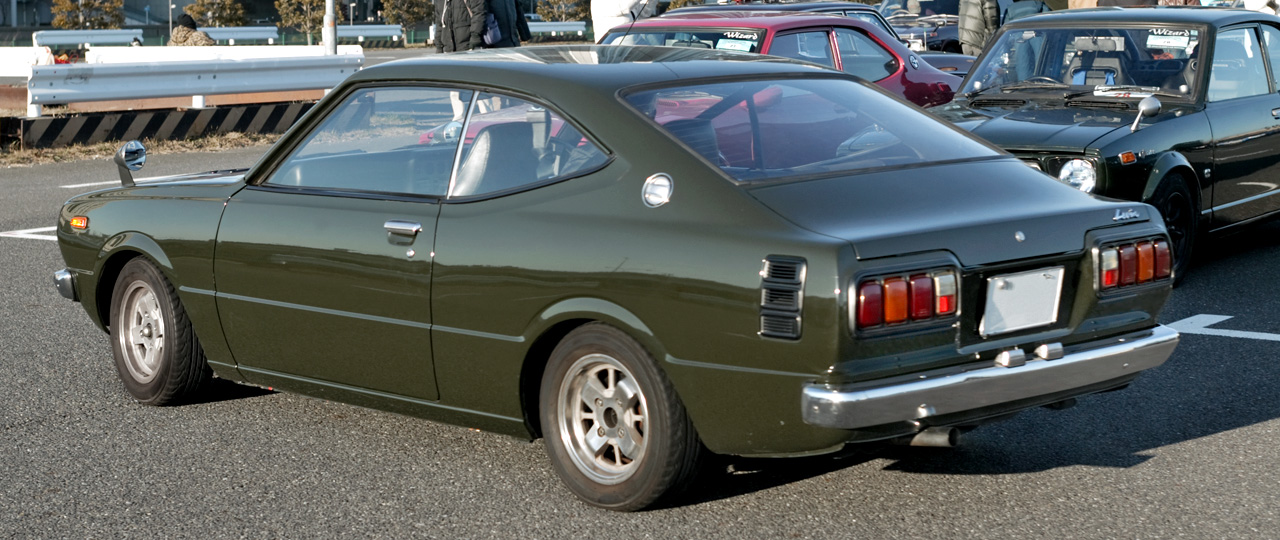
Rear view of Corolla Levin (TE37)

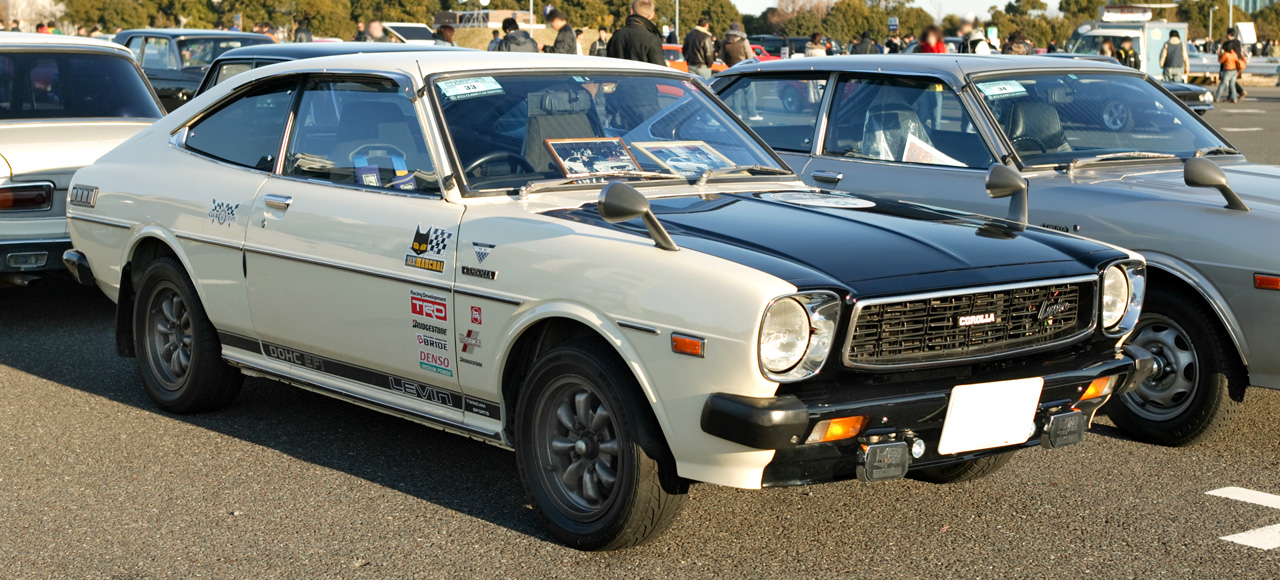
Corolla Levin (TE51, first facelift)

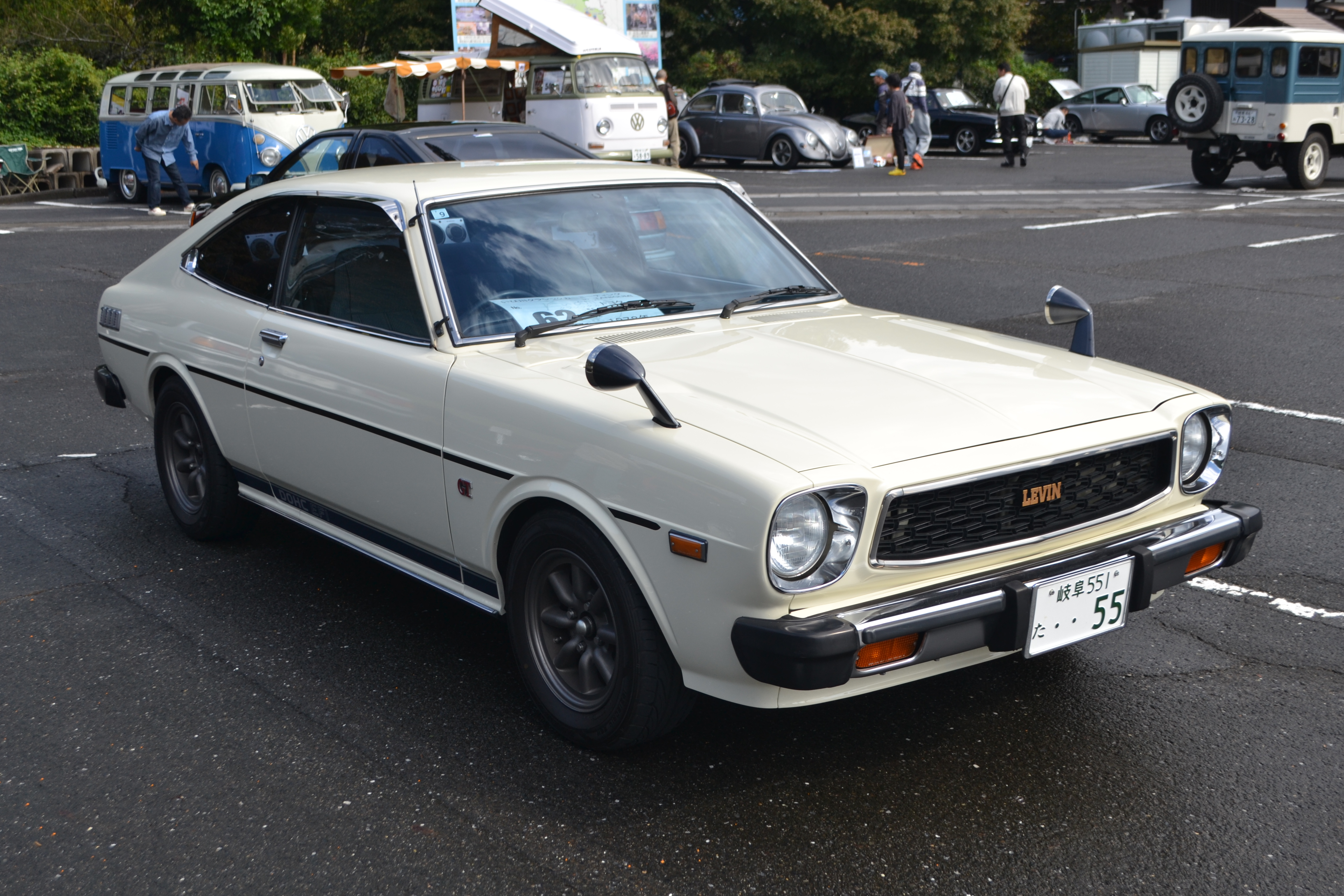
Toyota Corolla Levin GT (TE55, second facelift)

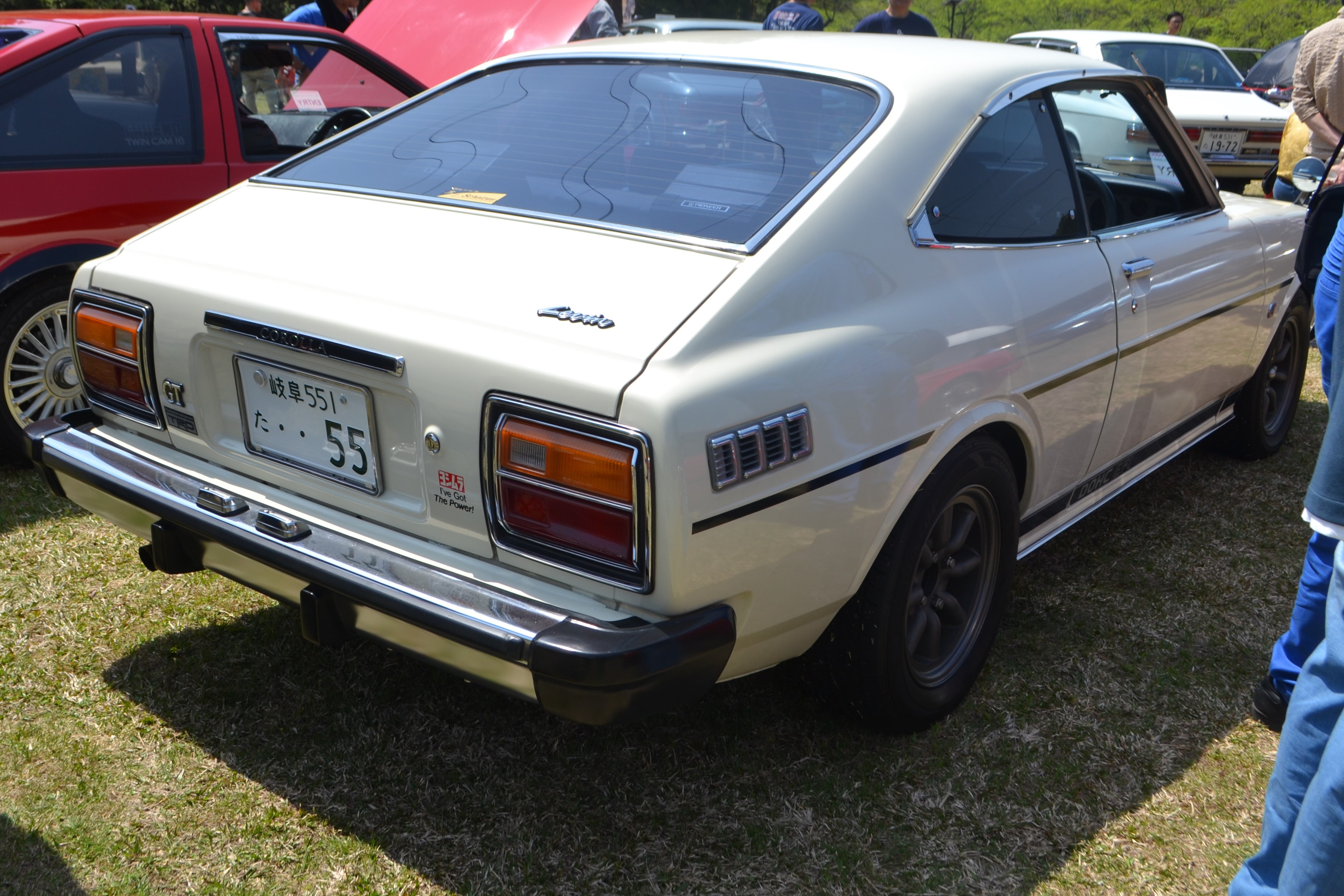
Rear view of Corolla Levin GT (TE51/55)

== TE71 Series (1979–1983) ==
Third generation
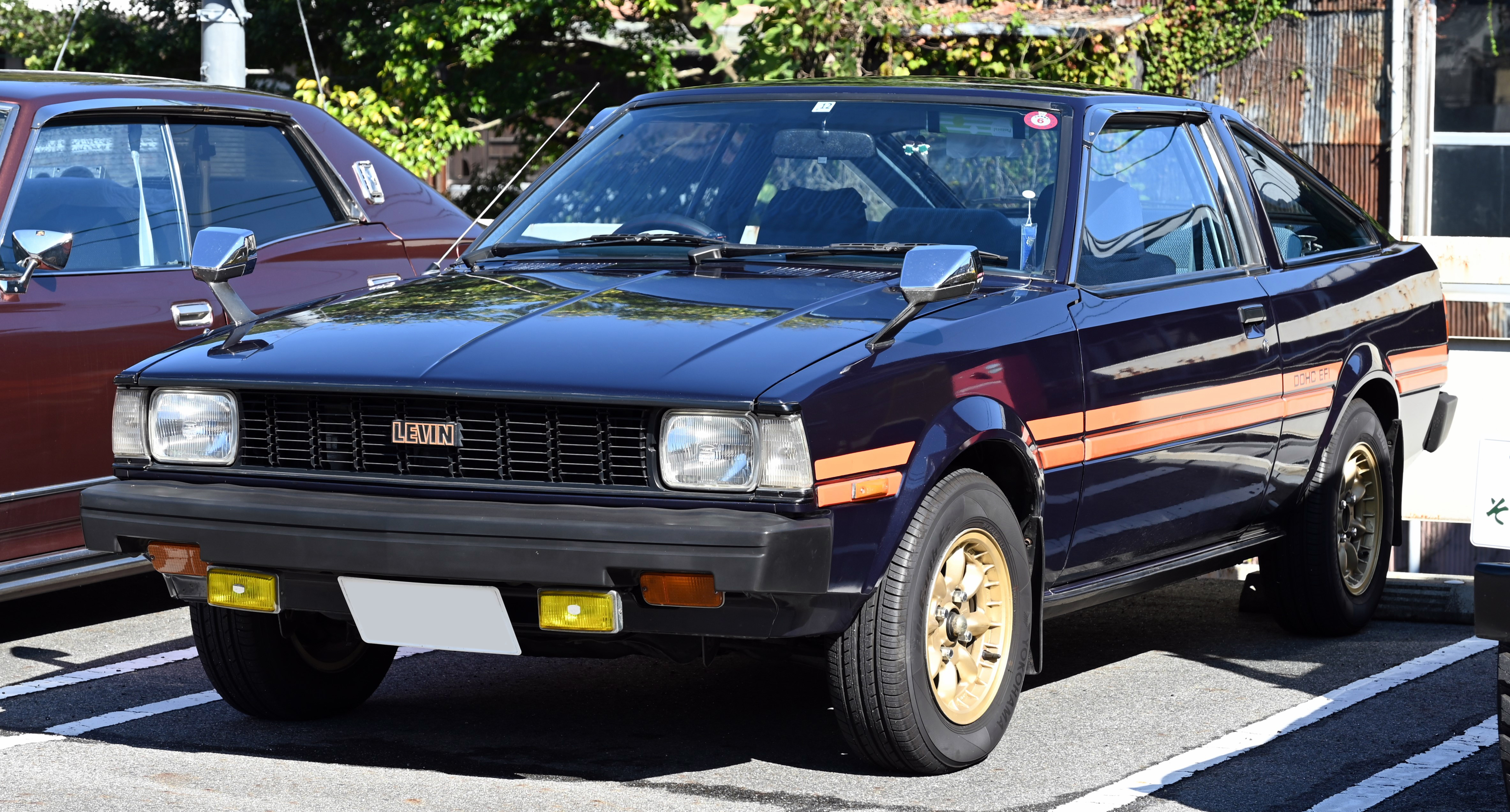
- Toyota Corolla Levin (TE71, pre-facelift)

Overview
- Model code: TE71
- Production: 1979–1983
- Assembly: Japan: Takaoka Plant, Toyota City

Body and chassis
- Body style: 3-door liftback
- Layout: Front engine, rear-wheel drive
- Related: Toyota Corolla (E70); Toyota Sprinter (E70); Daihatsu Charmant (A45)

Powertrain
- Engine: 1.6 L 2T-G/GEU DOHC I4
- Transmission: 5-speed T50 manual

Dimensions
- Wheelbase: 2,400 mm (94.5 in)
- Length: 4,105–4,175 mm (161.6–164.4 in) (Corolla GT); 4,120–4,255 mm (162.2–167.5 in) (Sprinter Trueno); 4,175–4,240 mm (164.4–166.9 in) (Corolla Levin)
- Width: 1,625 mm (64.0 in)
- Height: 1,325–1,335 mm (52.2–52.6 in)
- Curb weight: 955–990 kg (2,105.4–2,182.6 lb)

The third generation of the Sprinter Trueno and Corolla Levin was released in May 1979, powered by the same 115 PS (85 kW; 113 hp) fuel injected 2T-GEU engine from the previous generation. Unlike previous generations, this generation of the Trueno and Levin were exclusively 3-door liftbacks (marketed as a coupé, there was another liftback with steeper tailgate based on the hardtop coupé). Like the preceding models, the twin coupés had distinct front ends to set them apart. The Sprinter Trueno has a slanted nose with recessed mesh grille and headlights, whereas the Corolla Levin features a simpler front end with an almost vertical nose. This generation was now equipped with 4-wheel disc brakes as standard, rear suspension with coil springs like the E70 Corolla/Sprinter sedan and had a sunroof as an option. In the May 1981 facelift, two new trim levels were added to the line up; the cheaper "S" (with shorter front bumper) and the better optioned "APEX" (with standard sport seats). The Sprinter Trueno has a new, more aerodynamic front end with an inverted trapezoid slanted grille and half trapezoid-shaped flush headlights. The Corolla Levin, on the other hand, has larger headlights and a rectangle slanted grille.

The Corolla Levin was exported as the Corolla GT for select markets in Europe, powered by the twin double venturi side draft Mikuni-Solex 40PHH carburettors 2T-G engine, producing 108–110 PS (79–81 kW; 107–108 hp).

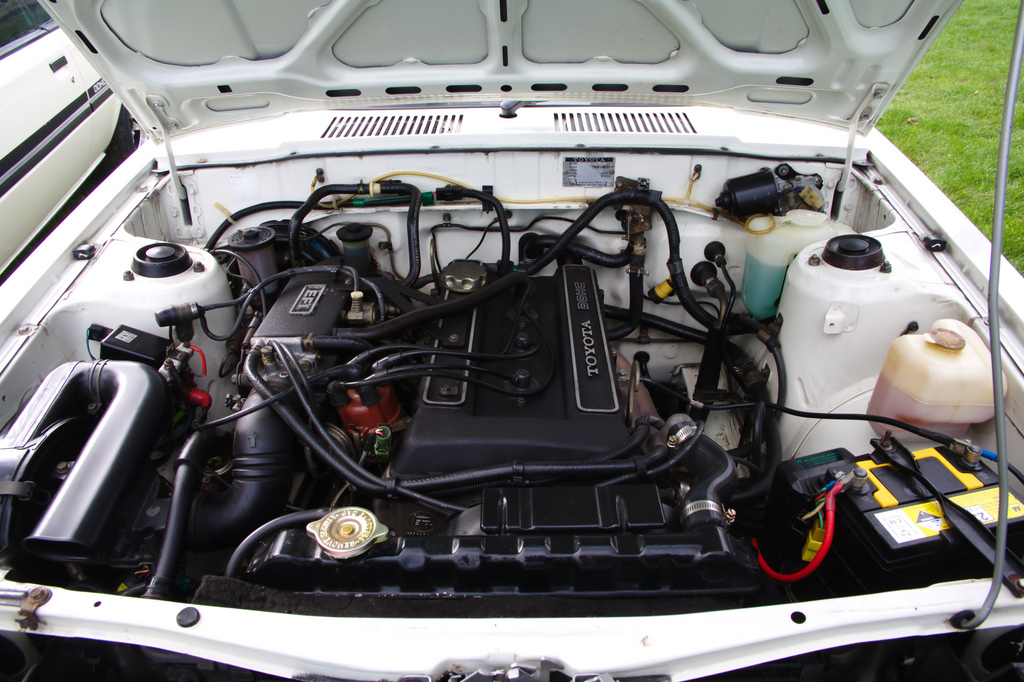
2T-GEU engine

Japanese version

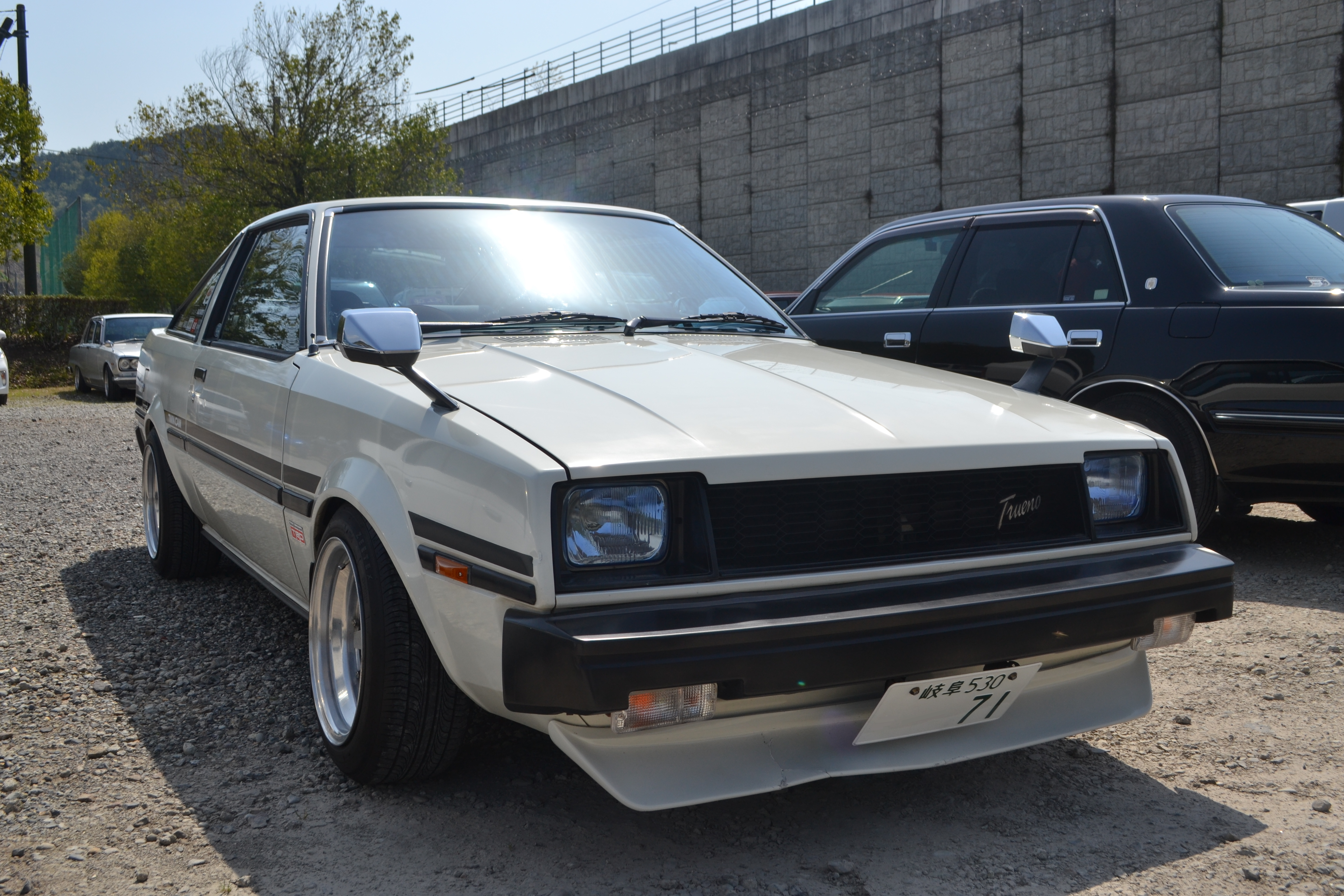
Sprinter Trueno (TE71, pre-facelift)

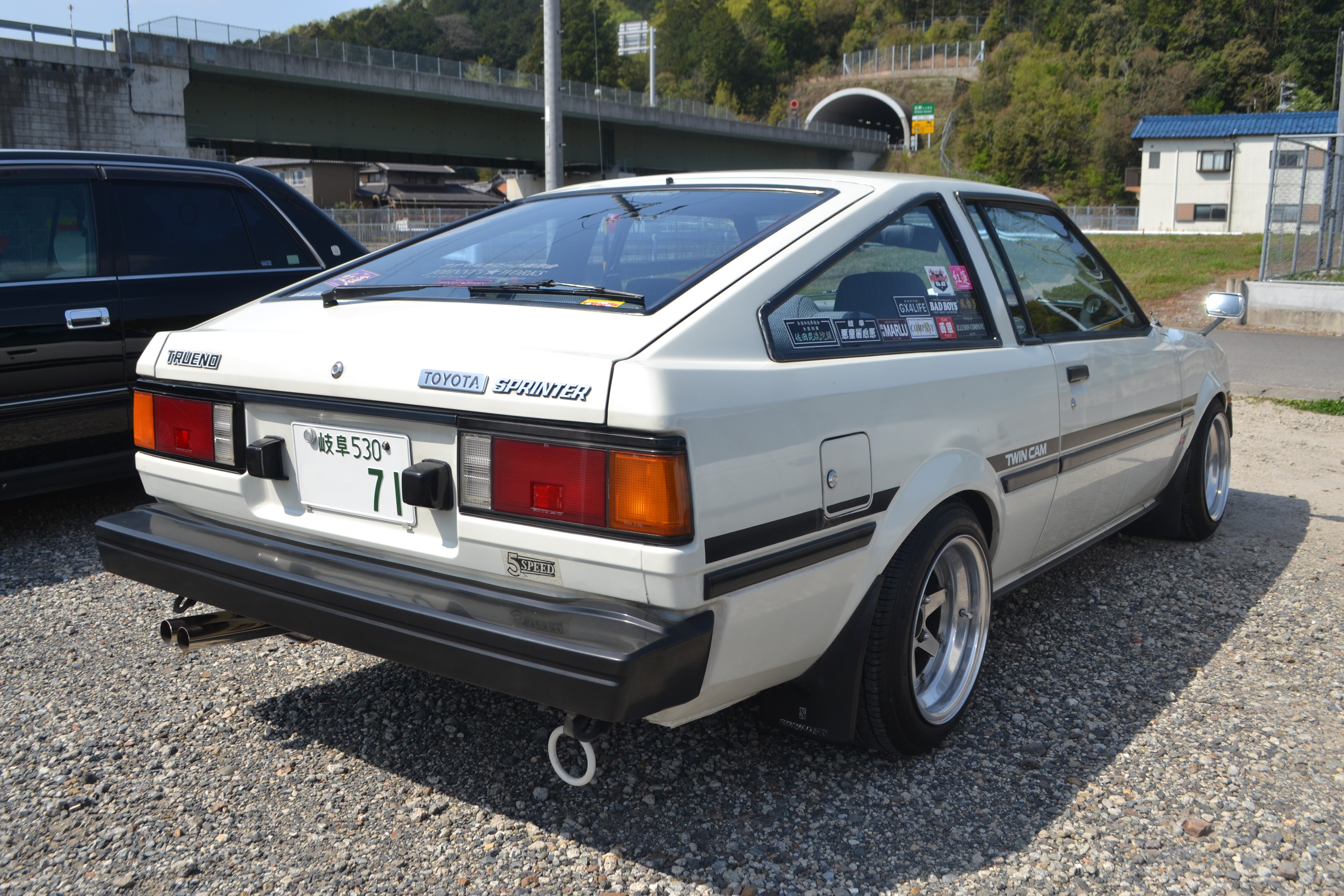
Sprinter Trueno (TE71, pre-facelift)

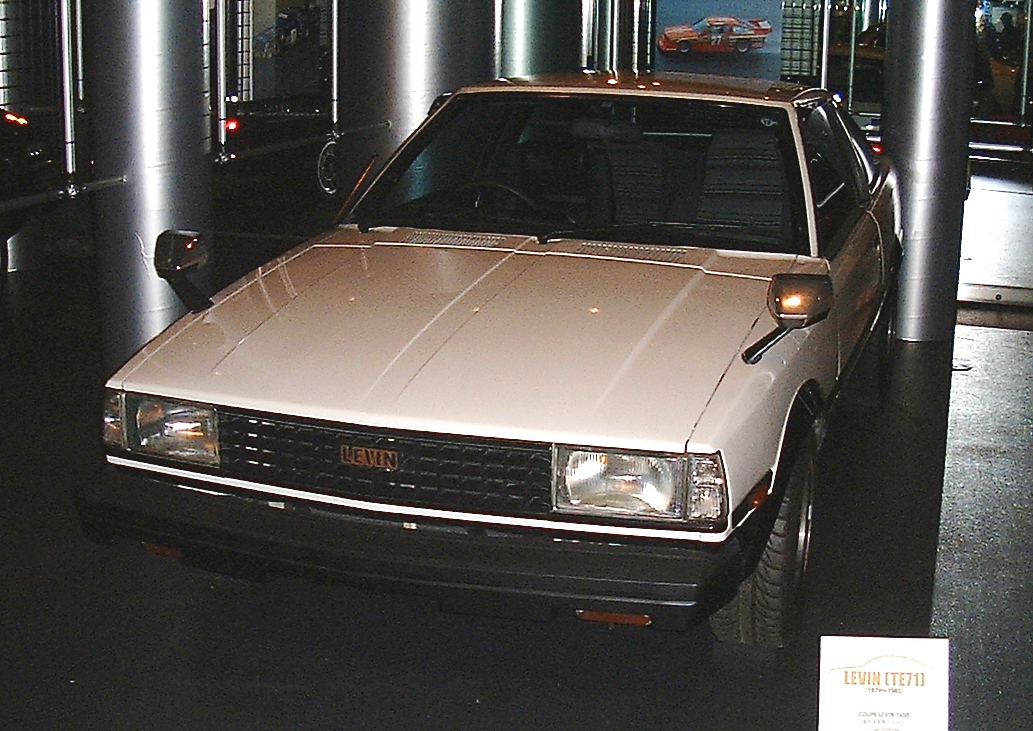
Corolla Levin (TE71, facelift)
European version

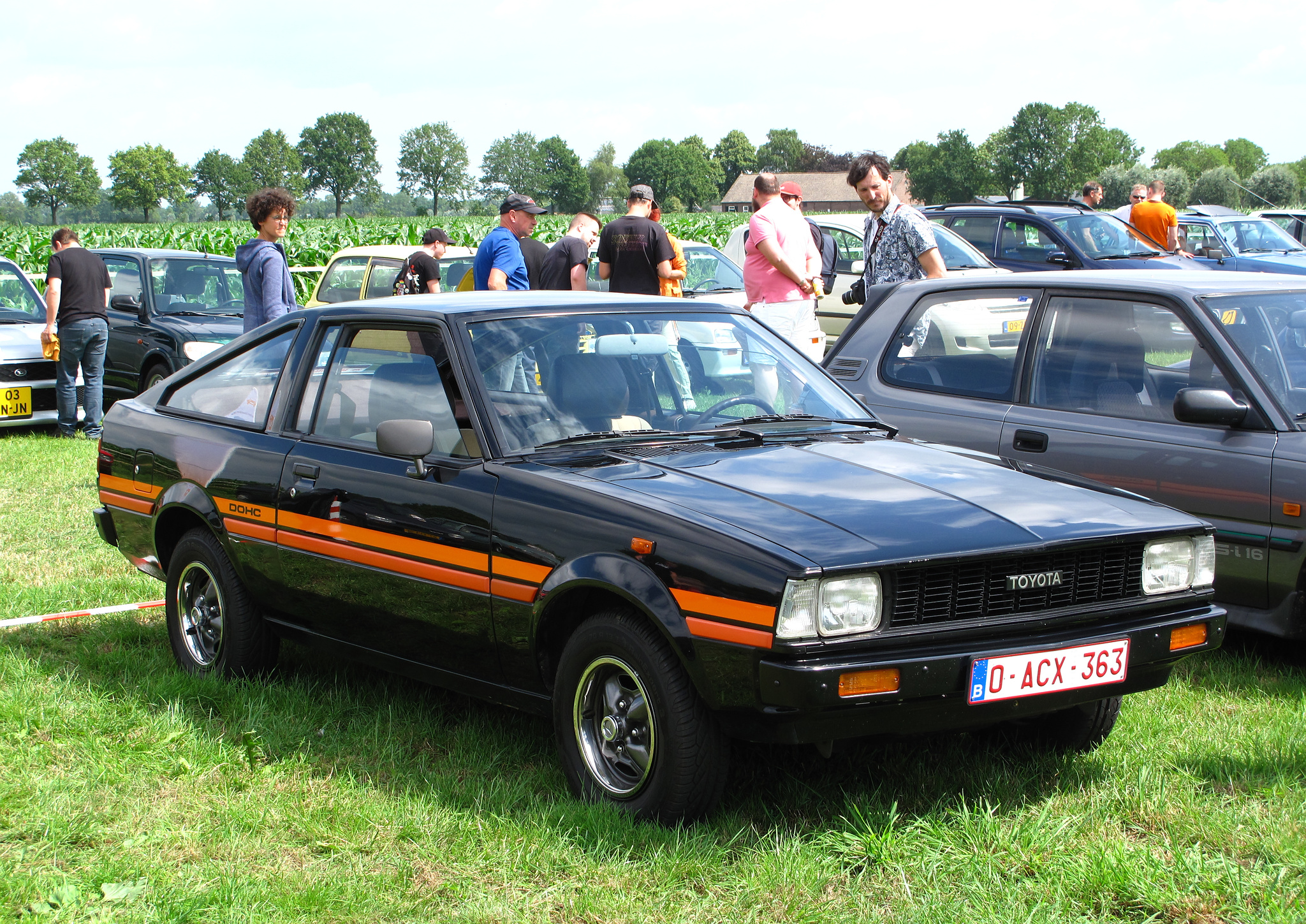
Corolla GT (TE71, pre-facelift)

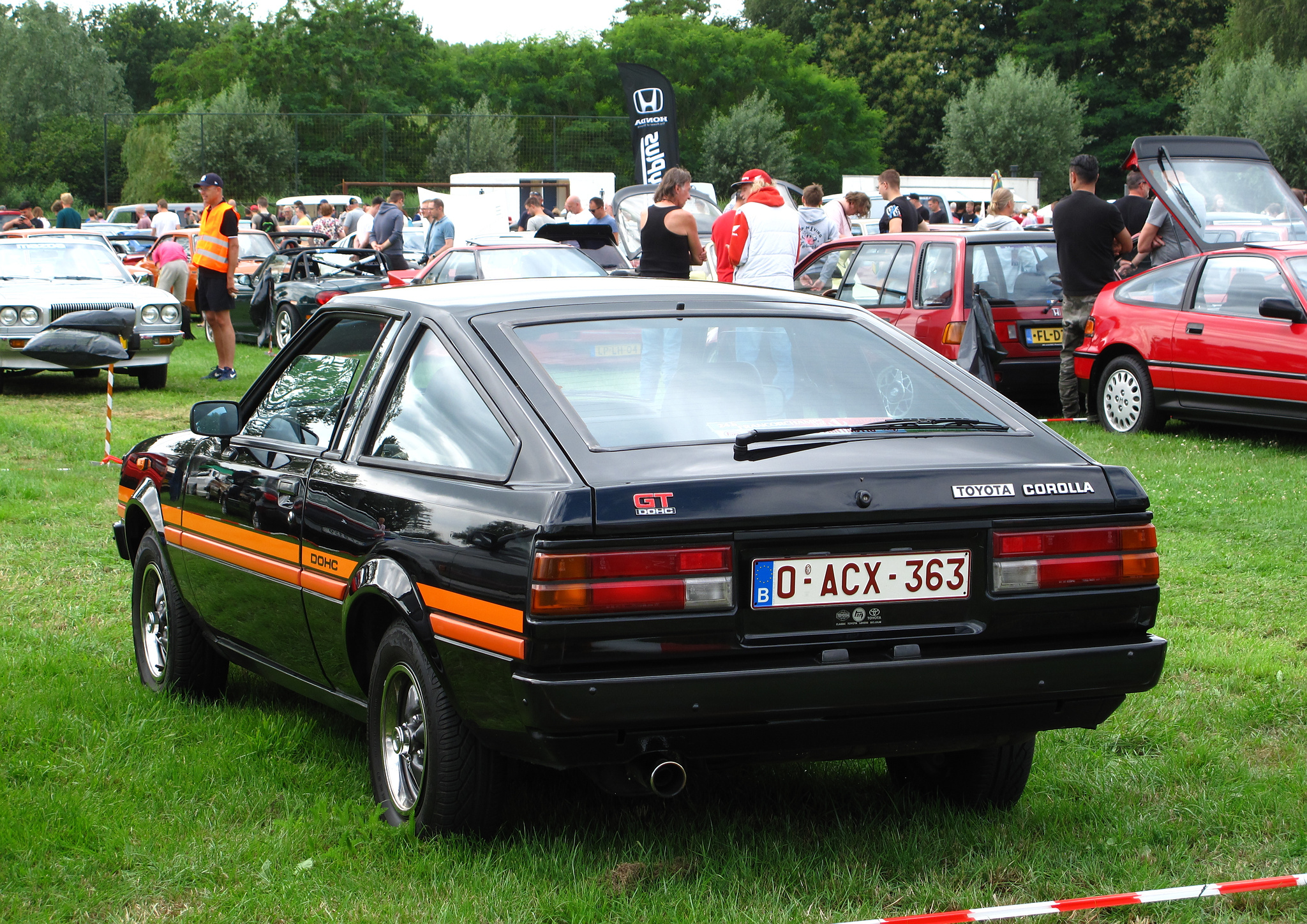
Rear view (TE71, pre-facelift)

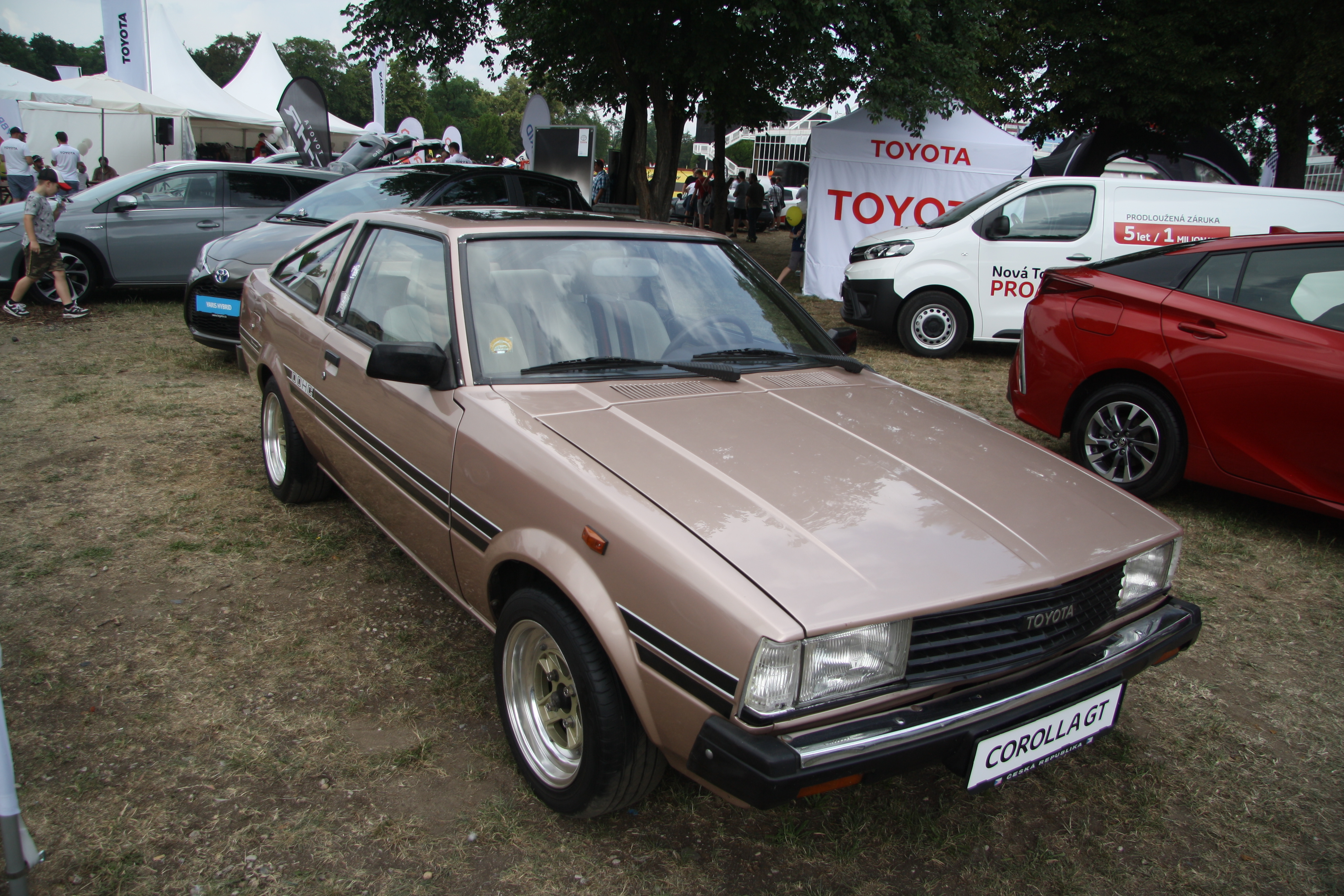
Corolla GT (TE71, facelift)

== AE85 & AE86 Series (1983–1987) ==
Fourth generation
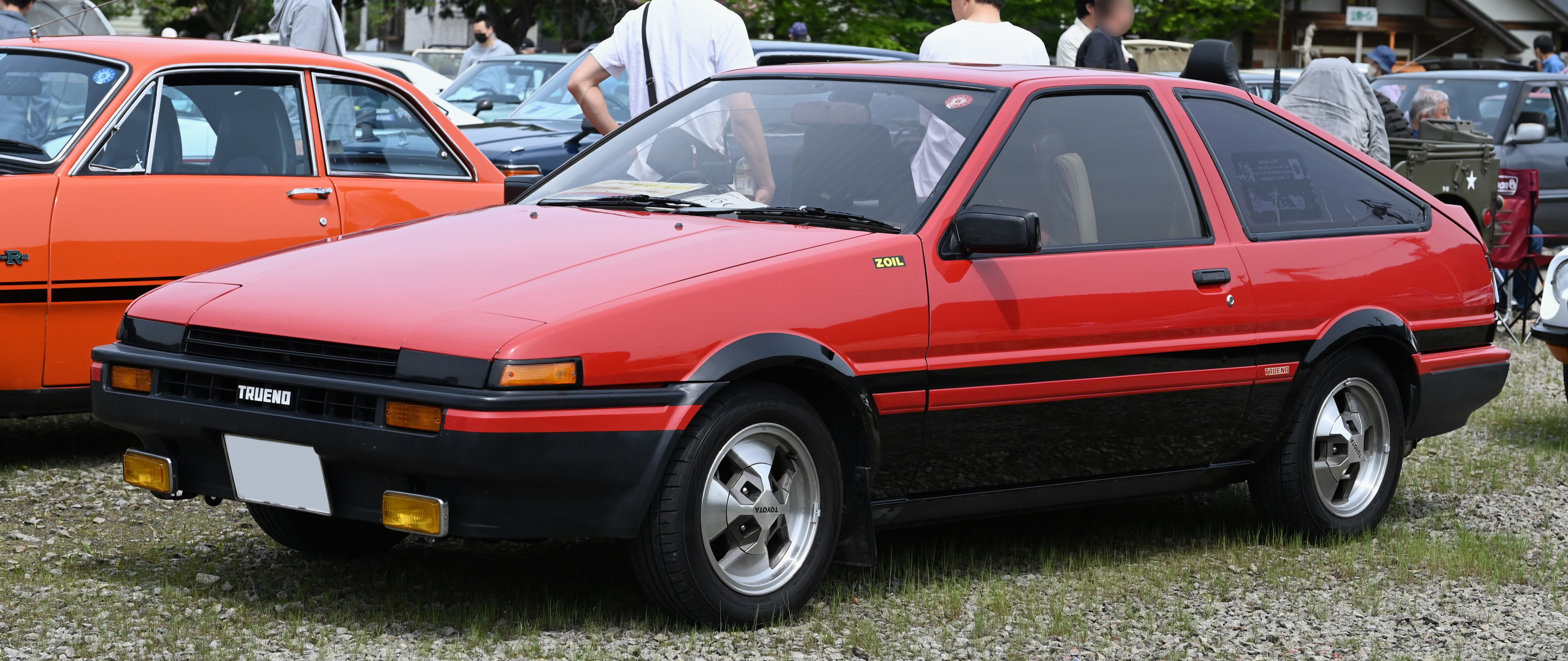
- Toyota Sprinter Trueno GT-APEX 3-door liftback (AE86, pre-facelift)

Overview
- Model code: AE85 (1.5 L); AE86 (1.6 L)
- Production: 1983–1987
- Assembly: Japan: Takaoka Plant, Toyota City; Japan: Susono, Shizuoka (Kanto Auto Works)

Body and chassis
- Body style: 2-door coupé 3-door liftback
- Layout: Front engine, rear-wheel drive
- Related: Toyota Corolla (E70); Toyota Sprinter (E70); Daihatsu Charmant (A55/60)

Powertrain
- Engine: 1.5 L 3A-U I4 SOHC; 1.6 L 4A/4A-C I4 SOHC; 1.6 L 4A-GE/GEC/GEU I4 DOHC
- Transmission: 5-speed K50 manual; 5-speed T50 manual; 4-speed A42DL automatic; 4-speed A44DE automatic

Dimensions
- Wheelbase: 2,400 mm (94 in)
- Length: Corolla Levin: 4,185 mm (165 in) (1983–1985); 4,200 mm (165 in) (1985–1987); Sprinter Trueno: 4,205 mm (166 in) (1983–1985); 4,215 mm (166 in) (1985–1987); North America/Middle East: 4,285 mm (169 in)
- Width: 1,625 mm (64 in)
- Height: 1,335 mm (53 in)
- Curb weight: 855–1,045 kg (1,885–2,304 lb)

The fourth generation of the Sprinter Trueno and Corolla Levin was released in May 1983 and was offered in 2-door coupé and 3-door liftback body styles. This was the last in the series to use the front-engine, rear-wheel drive platform, which was carried over from the previous generation with major modifications. From this generation, all coupés (and liftbacks in this generation) were marketed with both the "Trueno/Levin" suffix and its own trim levels to further differentiate it from the regular Corolla/Sprinter line up. Also in this generation, the Corolla Levin came with fixed rectangular headlights while the Sprinter Trueno used retractable pop-up headlights to distinguish itself from the Corolla Levin. Trim levels ranged from the base model GL, GL-Lime, XL and XL-Lissé, the-mid range SE and SR, to the highest-grade GT, GT-V and GT-APEX, with different options and features for each trim level.

=== Markets ===
==== North America ====
The North American Corolla GT-S, SR-5 and DX (US coupé only) uses the same front-end as the Japanese-market Sprinter Trueno, complete with retractable pop-up headlights, but has different and longer bumpers in the front and rear in order to comply with US federal standards. It also used the Corolla Levin's taillights instead of the ones from the Sprinter Trueno. This version was also sold in the Middle East as the Corolla GT, offered with a sole liftback body style and lack of the side marker lights on the rear wings.

==== Other Markets ====
The European and general export markets (such as Chile, Hong Kong and New Zealand) Corolla GT (not available as coupé for general export) and SR had the same styling as the Corolla Levin. This specification can be recognized by the use of standard grille with "TOYOTA" badge, turn signal on the front wings (Europe only), rear license plate lights that illuminate from below, fuel door with keyhole (optional for general export) and sometimes equipped with hubcaps and headlights washer. The Australian market version was only available as liftback and marketed simply as the Sprinter, having the similar appearance as the general export GT liftback but fitted with Sprinter Trueno's taillights instead.

From this generation, the old 1.6 L DOHC 8-valve 2T-GEU engine used in previous generations was replaced with a more modern DOHC 16-valve 4A-GEU engine (also known as the 4A-GEC in North America, West Germany, Switzerland and Sweden, or simply as 4A-GE for the rest of the world). The new engine is 15 PS (11 kW; 15 hp) more powerful, 23 kg (51 lb) lighter and also 4 dB quieter than the old engine. A carbureted SOHC 8-valve version of the new 1.6 L DOHC engine called the 4A was also available for select general export markets and the 4A-C for the lower-grade models in North America, Australia, Switzerland and Sweden,

==== Japan ====
While the Japanese market received the 1.5 L SOHC 8-valve version of the A-series engine called the 3A-U exclusively for the AE85 range. These SOHC engines were inherited from the previous E70 series Corolla/Sprinter range. The option for an automatic transmission was also available for first time in the Sprinter Trueno/Corolla Levin range during this generation. In Japan, automatic transmission was available as an option for all engines, depending on the trim level, while in some export markets, it was only offered for the SOHC-engined models.

=== Facelift ===
Minor bodywork changes were made in May 1985, which included different taillights, updated bumpers with wrap-around front indicators, corner and headlight trim lights, interior, and grilles. New paint colours have also been introduced. Both the Levin and Trueno now have halogen lamps as standard, and the seats on both the GT-V and GT-APEX models have been redesigned.

The AE85 models in Japan also received the same treatment with some minor changes, for instance, the AE85 model Sprinter Trueno in Japan replaced the cornering lamps on the front bumpers with non-illuminating orange inserts. In January 1986, Toyota marketed a limited-edition model of the AE86 known as the "Black Limited" model. It was advertised as a limited-production model with only 400 units, and was based on the facelifted Sprinter Trueno GT-APEX 3-door liftback. It came with an exclusive all-black paint job, gold wheels, and gold badges.

For the European and general export markets, only the front end was refreshed, same as the facelifted Corolla Levin. However, the facelift model for North American and Middle Eastern markets only received new taillights from the facelifted Corolla Levin. Coinciding with the introduction of new safety regulations for 1986 model year cars in North America, a high-mounted brake lights was added behind the rear windshield glass for this market.

Sprinter Trueno

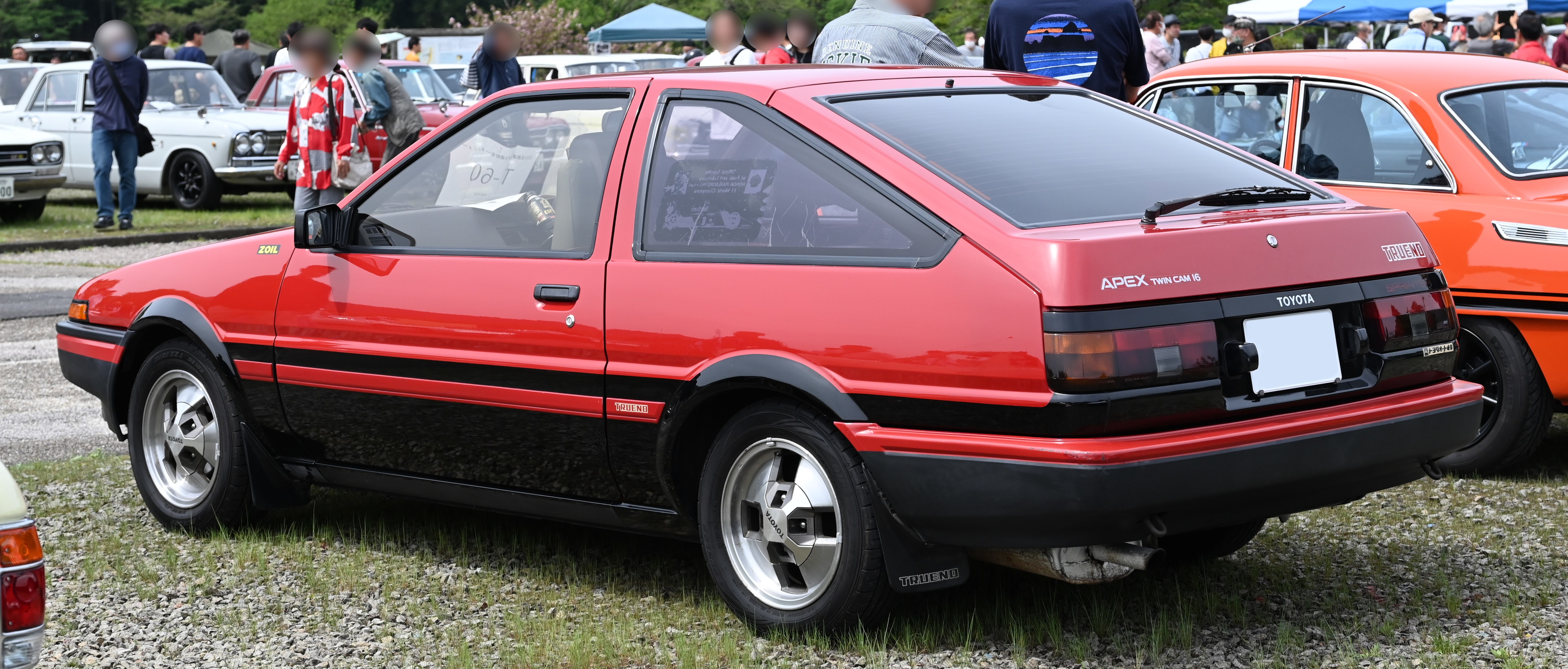
Sprinter Trueno GT-APEX liftback (AE86, pre-facelift)

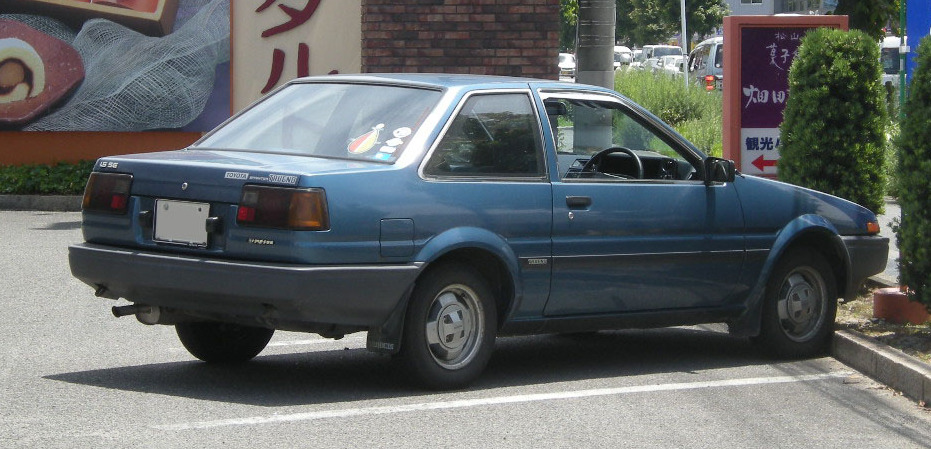
Sprinter Trueno SE coupé (AE85, pre-facelift)

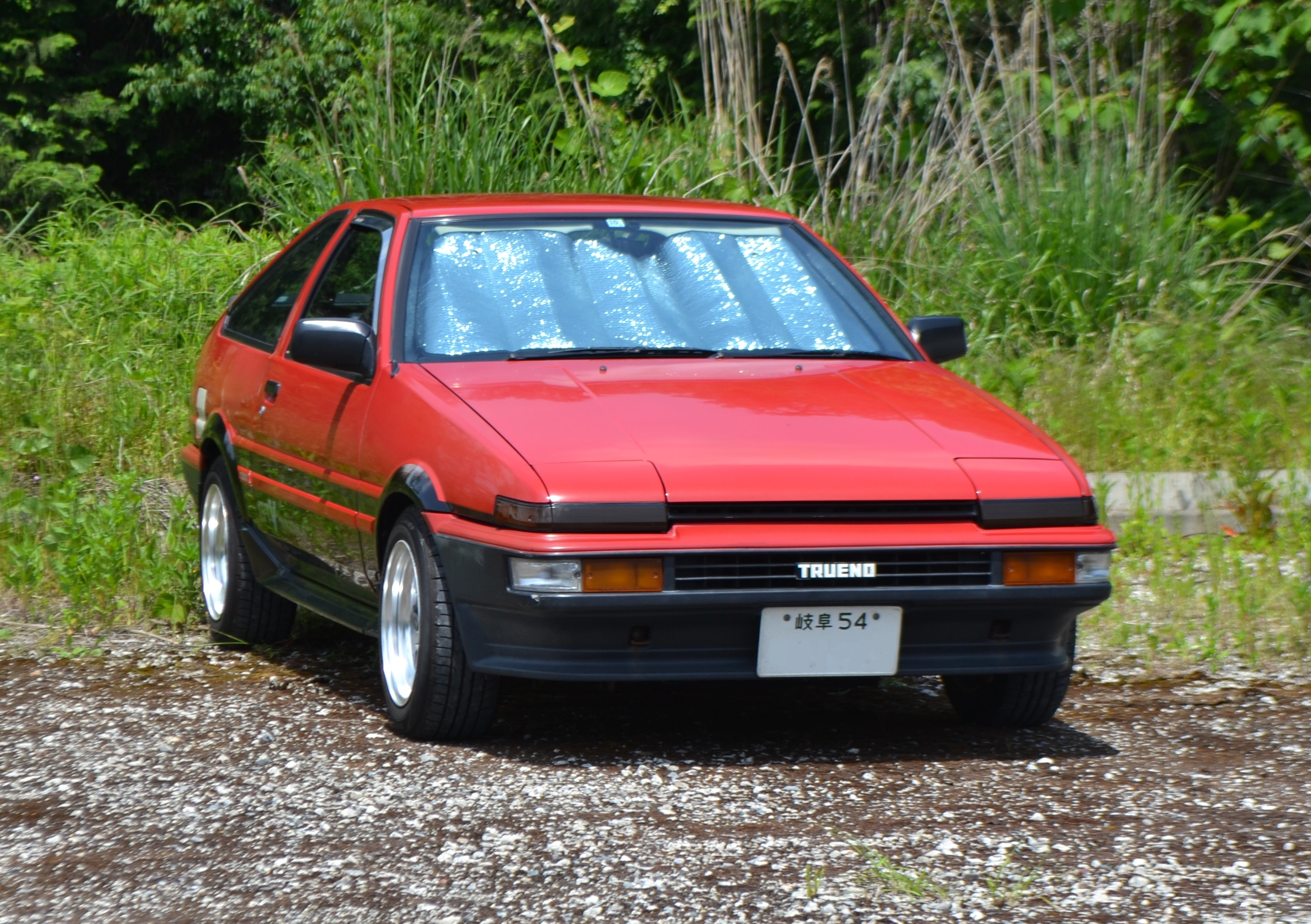
Sprinter Trueno GT-V liftback (AE86, facelift)

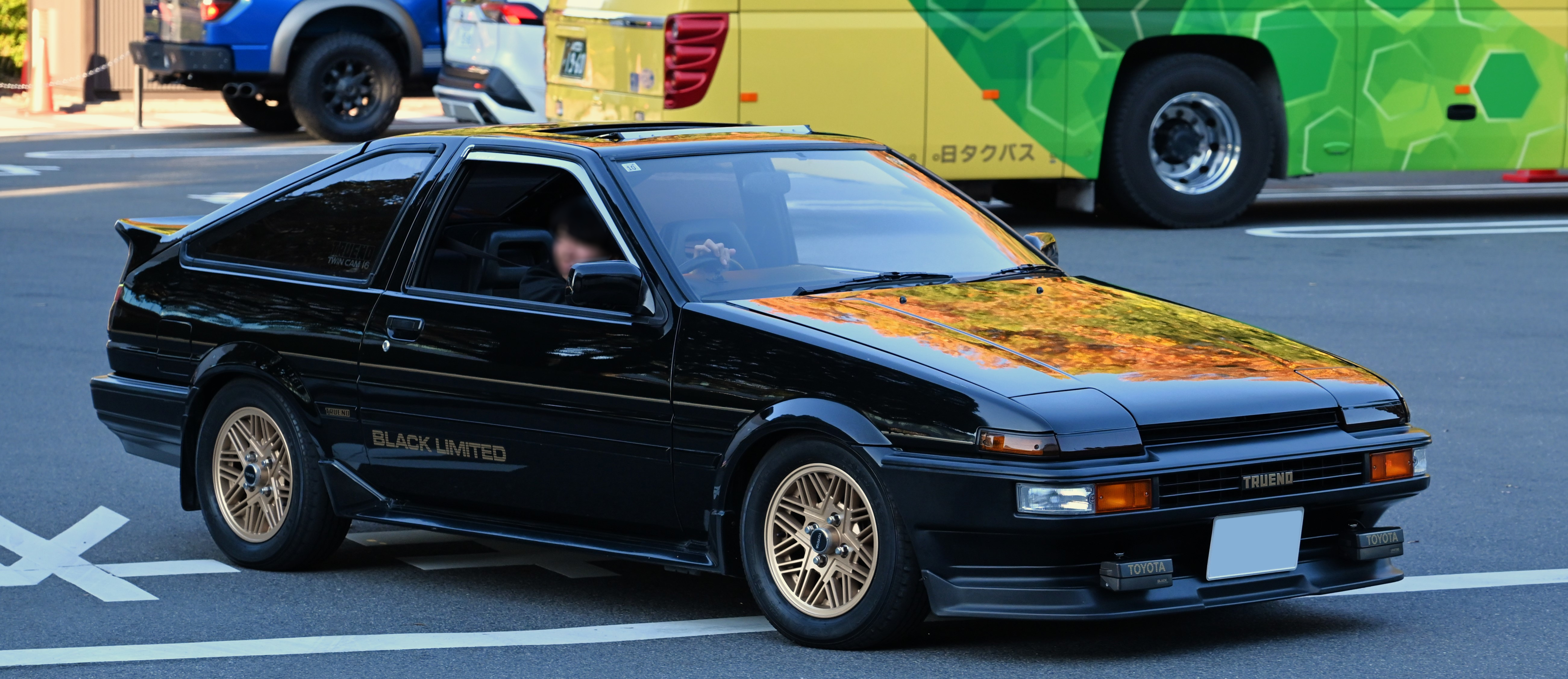
Sprinter Trueno Black Limited liftback (AE86, facelift)

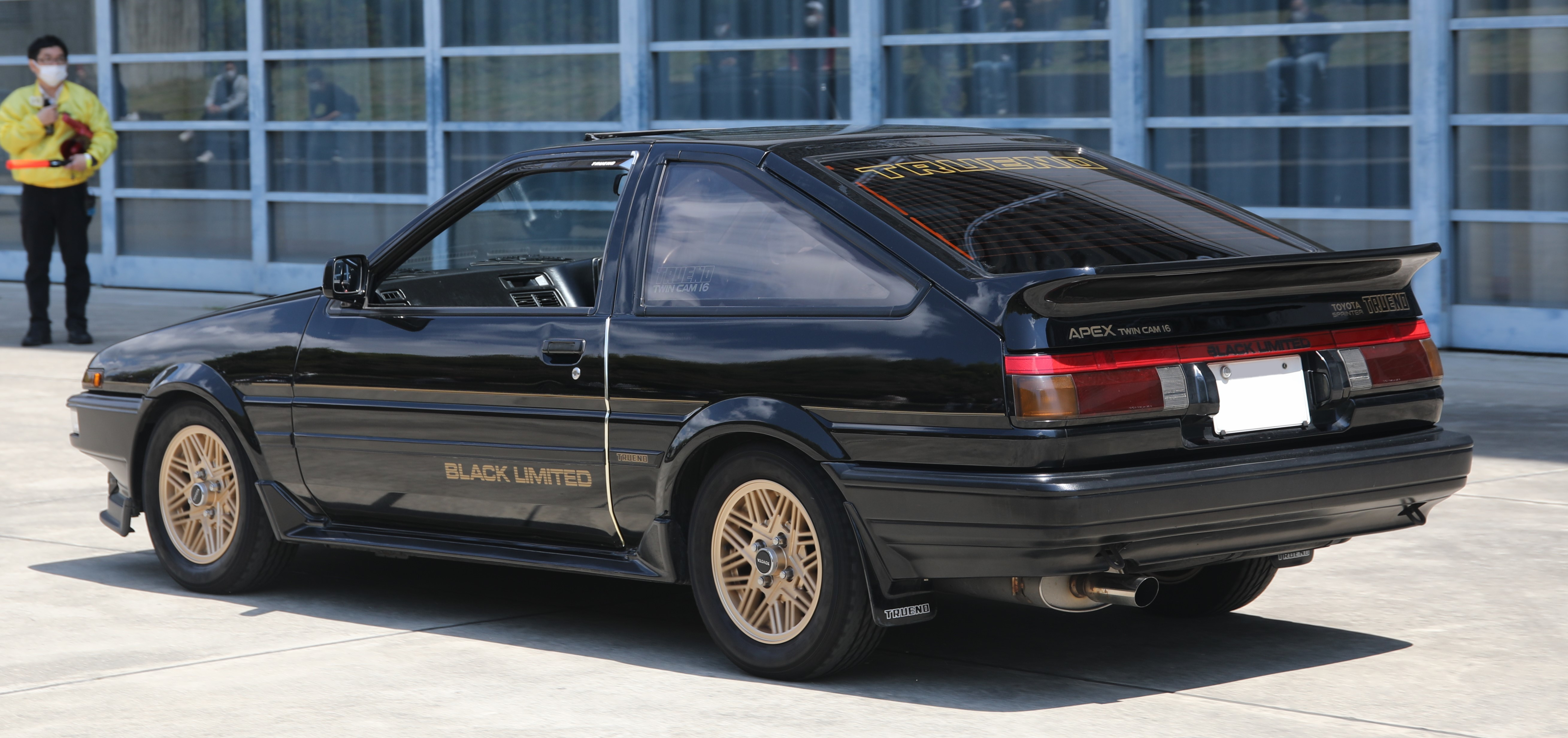
Sprinter Trueno Black Limited liftback (AE86, facelift)

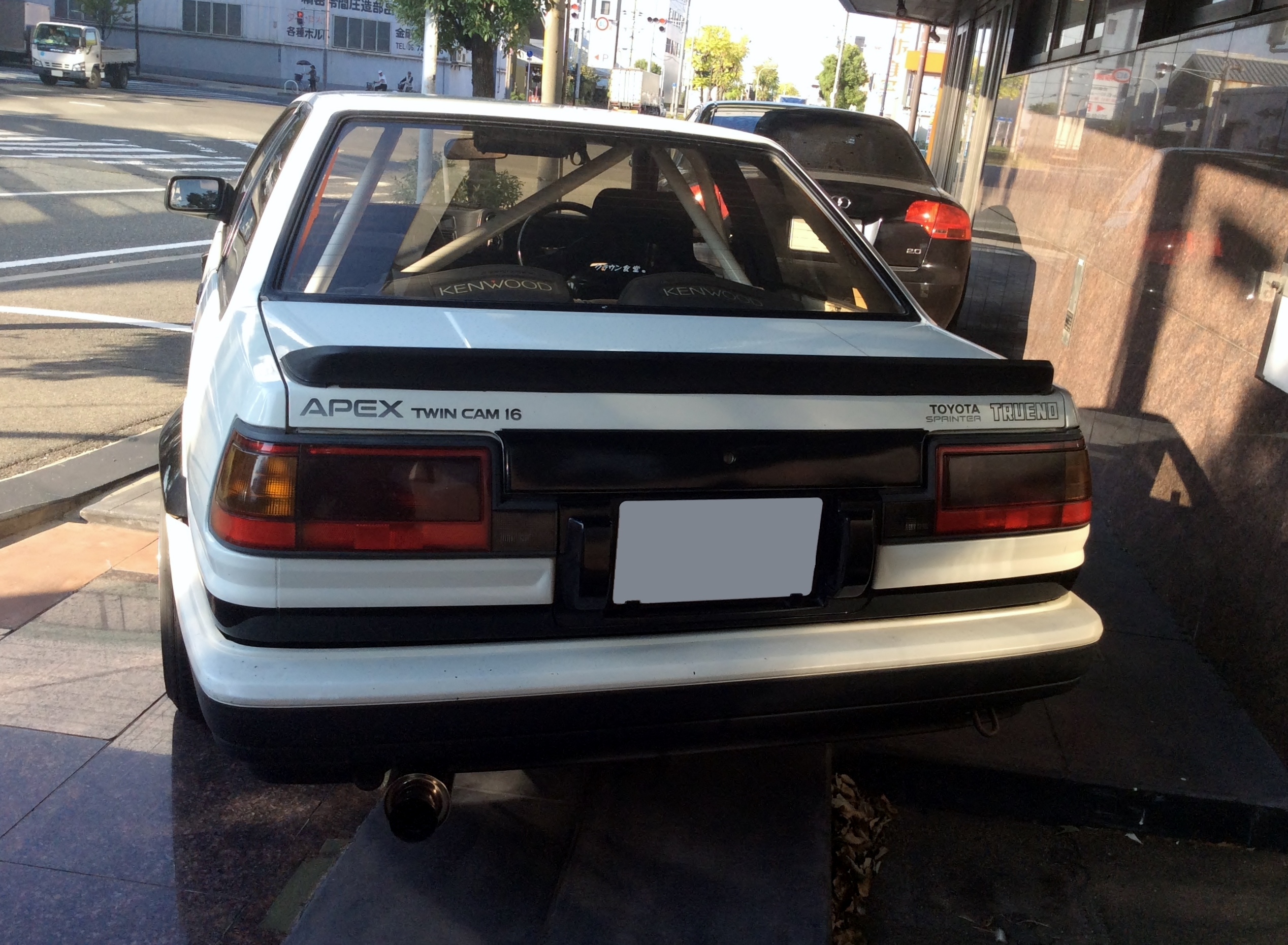
Sprinter Trueno GT-APEX coupé (AE86, facelift)
Corolla Levin

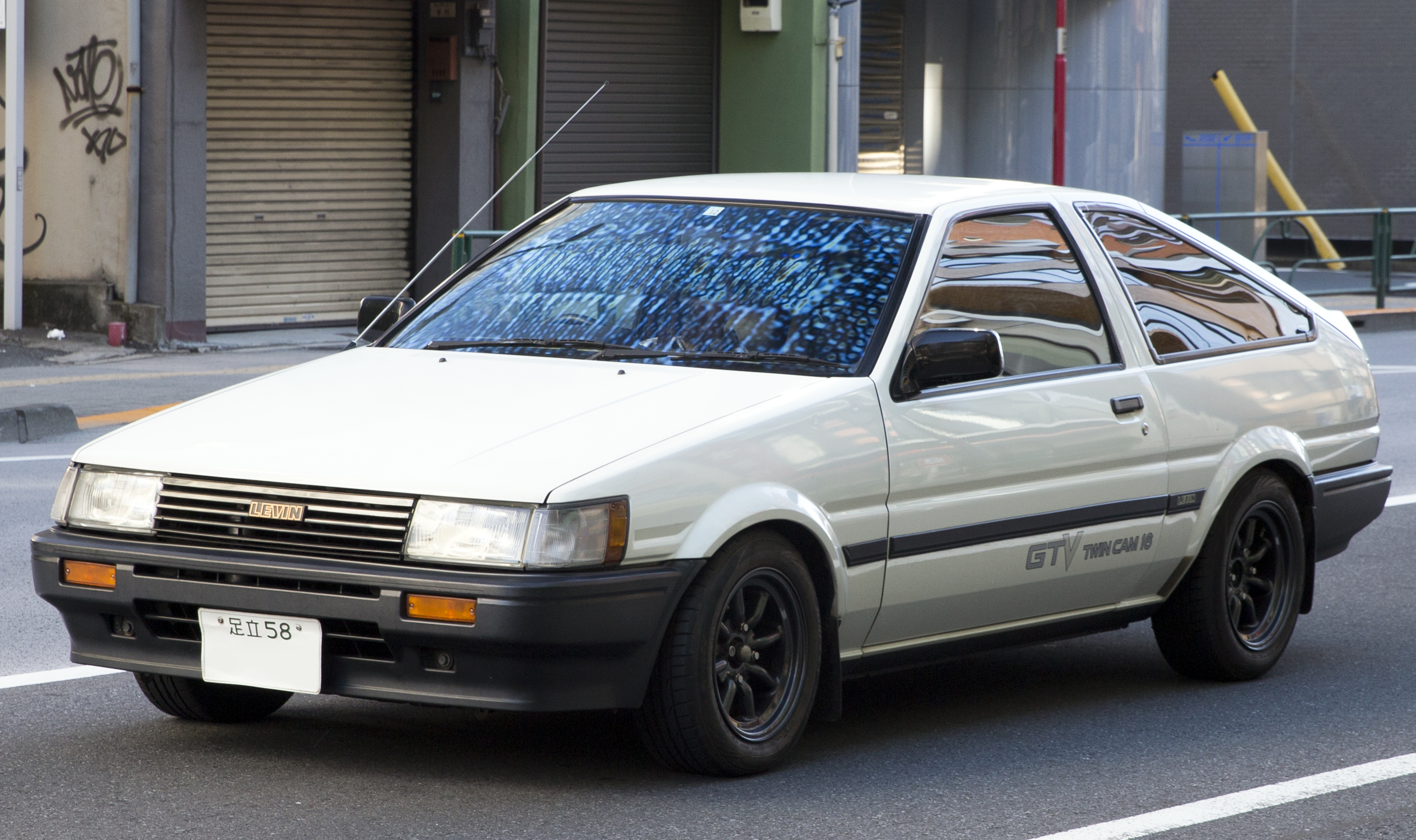
Corolla GT-V liftback with standard grille (AE86, pre-facelift)

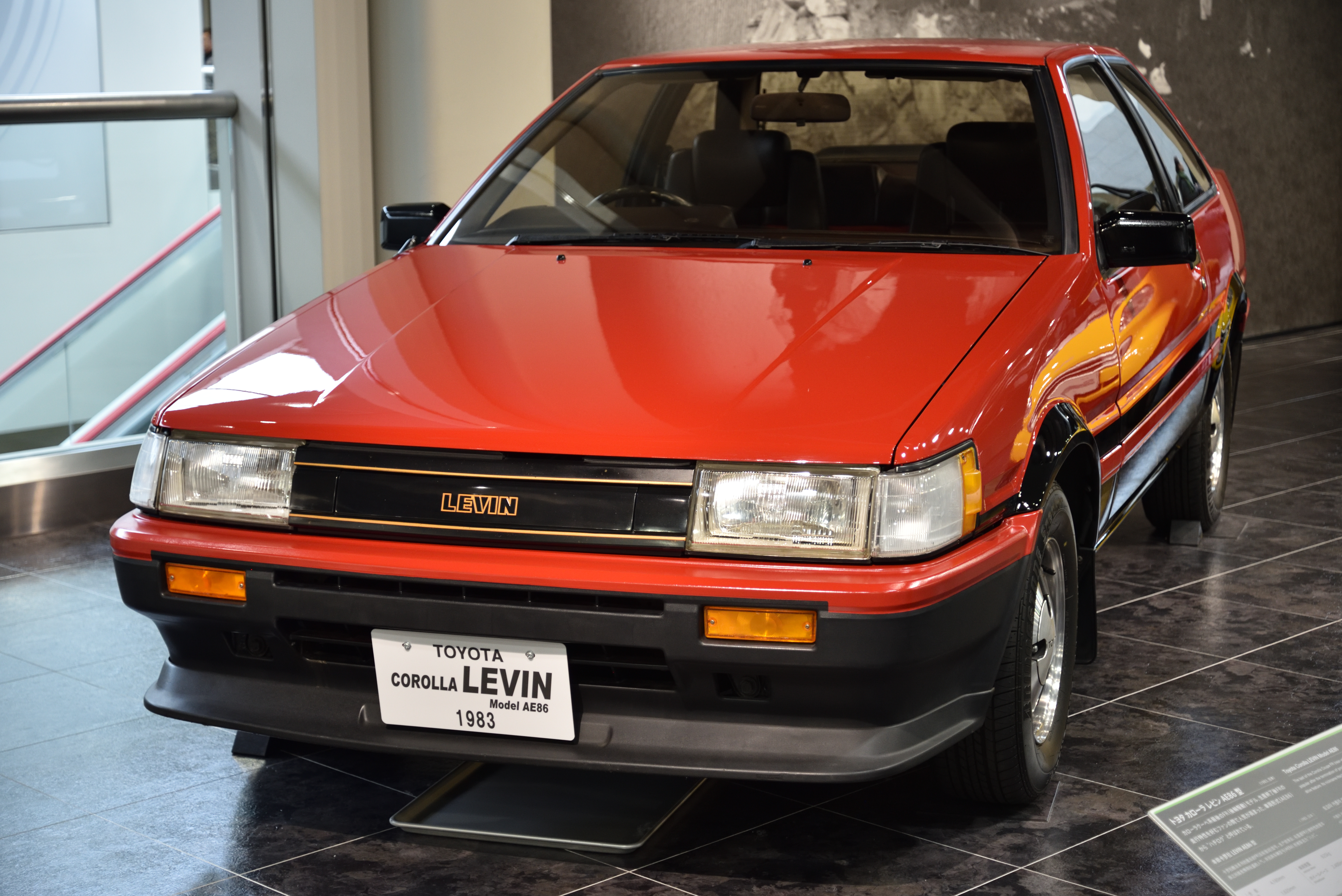
Corolla Levin GT-APEX coupé with optional thermostatic flip-up grille (AE86, pre-facelift)

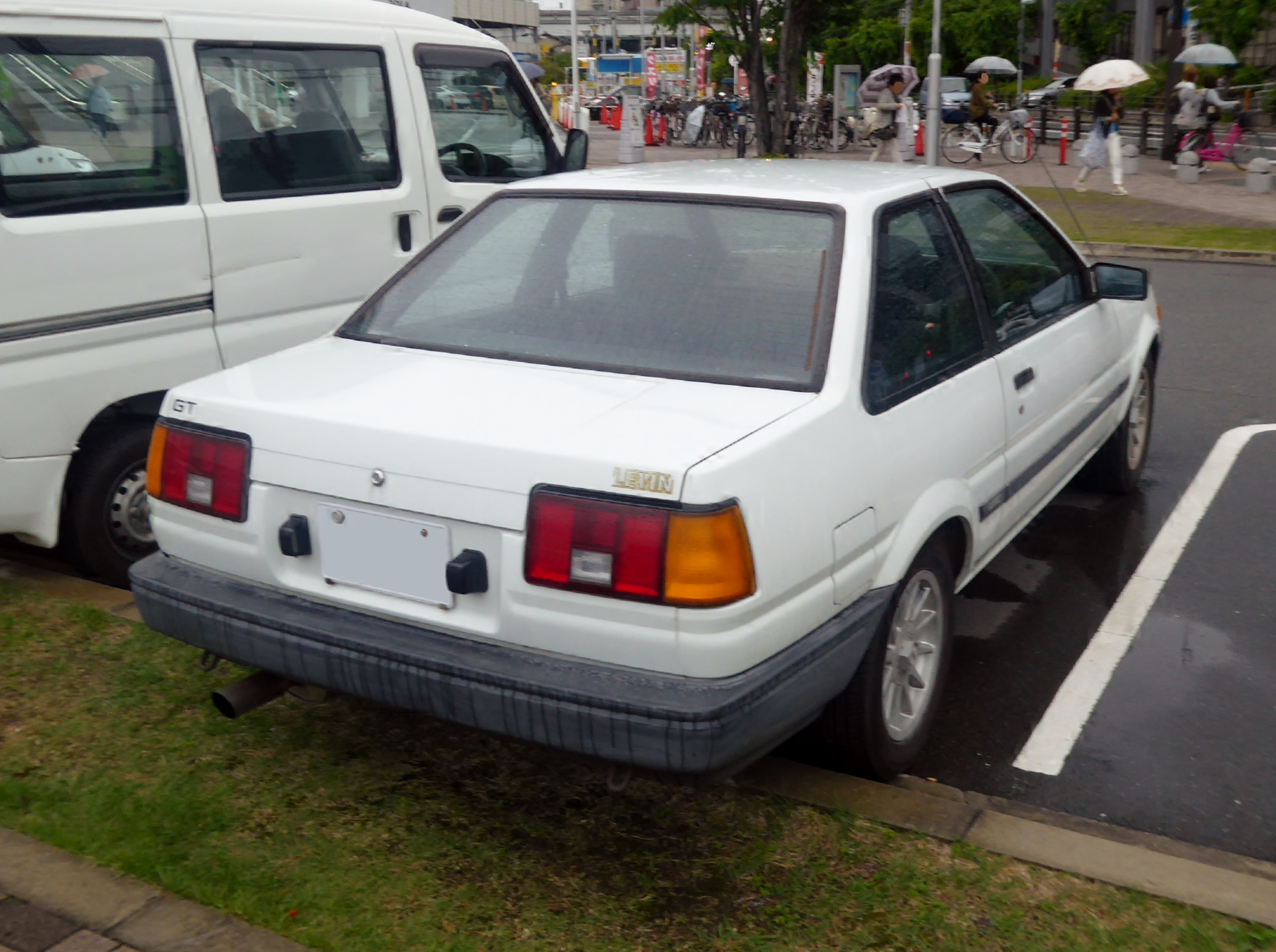
Corolla Levin GT coupé (AE86, pre-facelift)

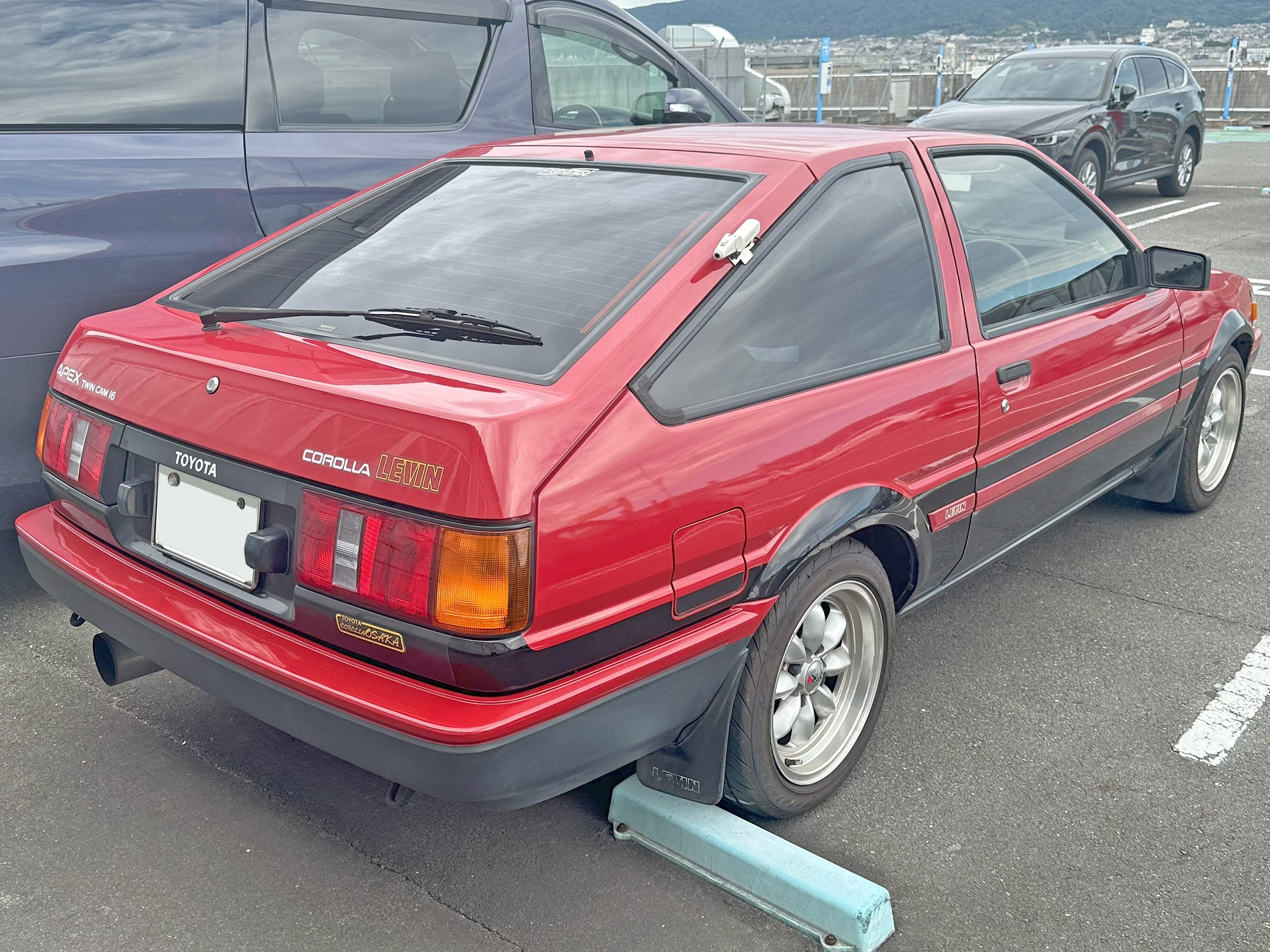
Corolla Levin GT-APEX liftback (AE86, pre-facelift)

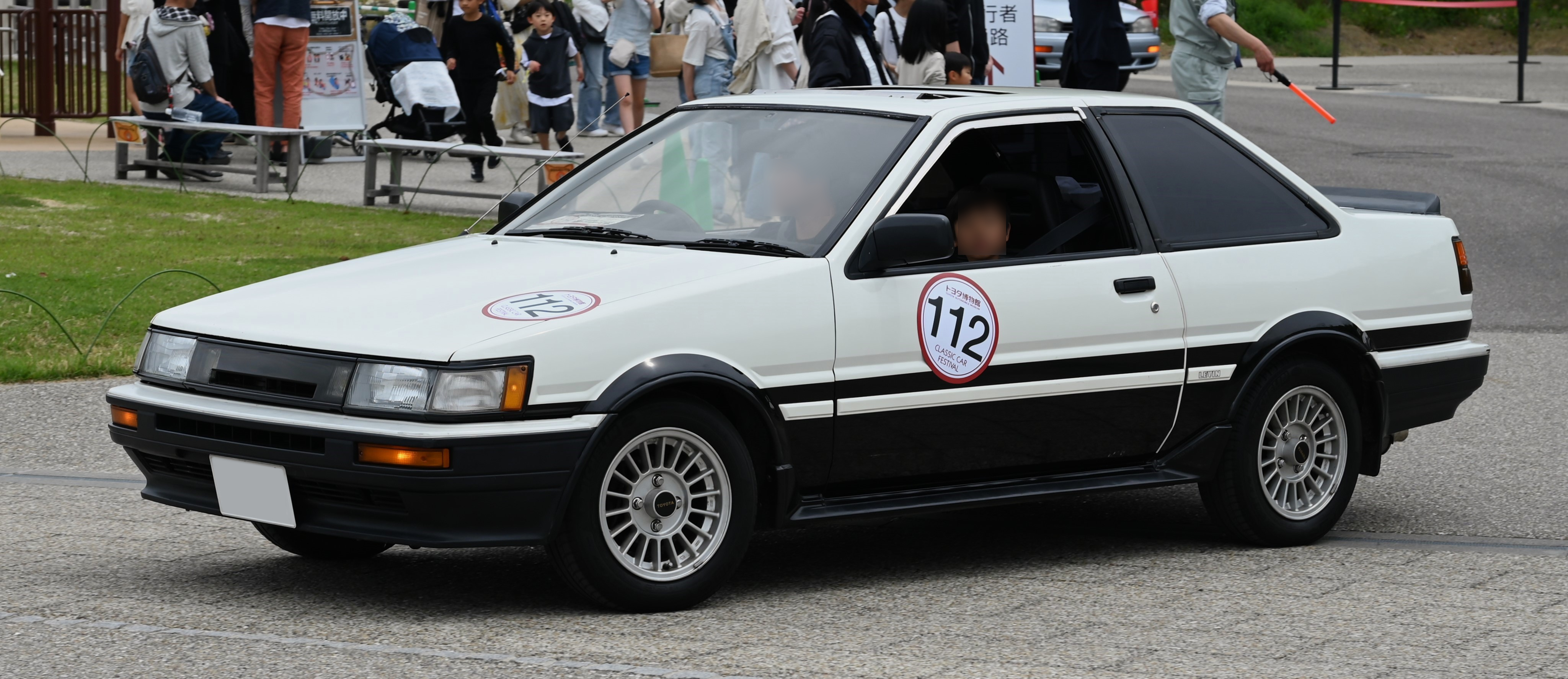
Corolla Levin GT-APEX coupé (AE86, facelift)

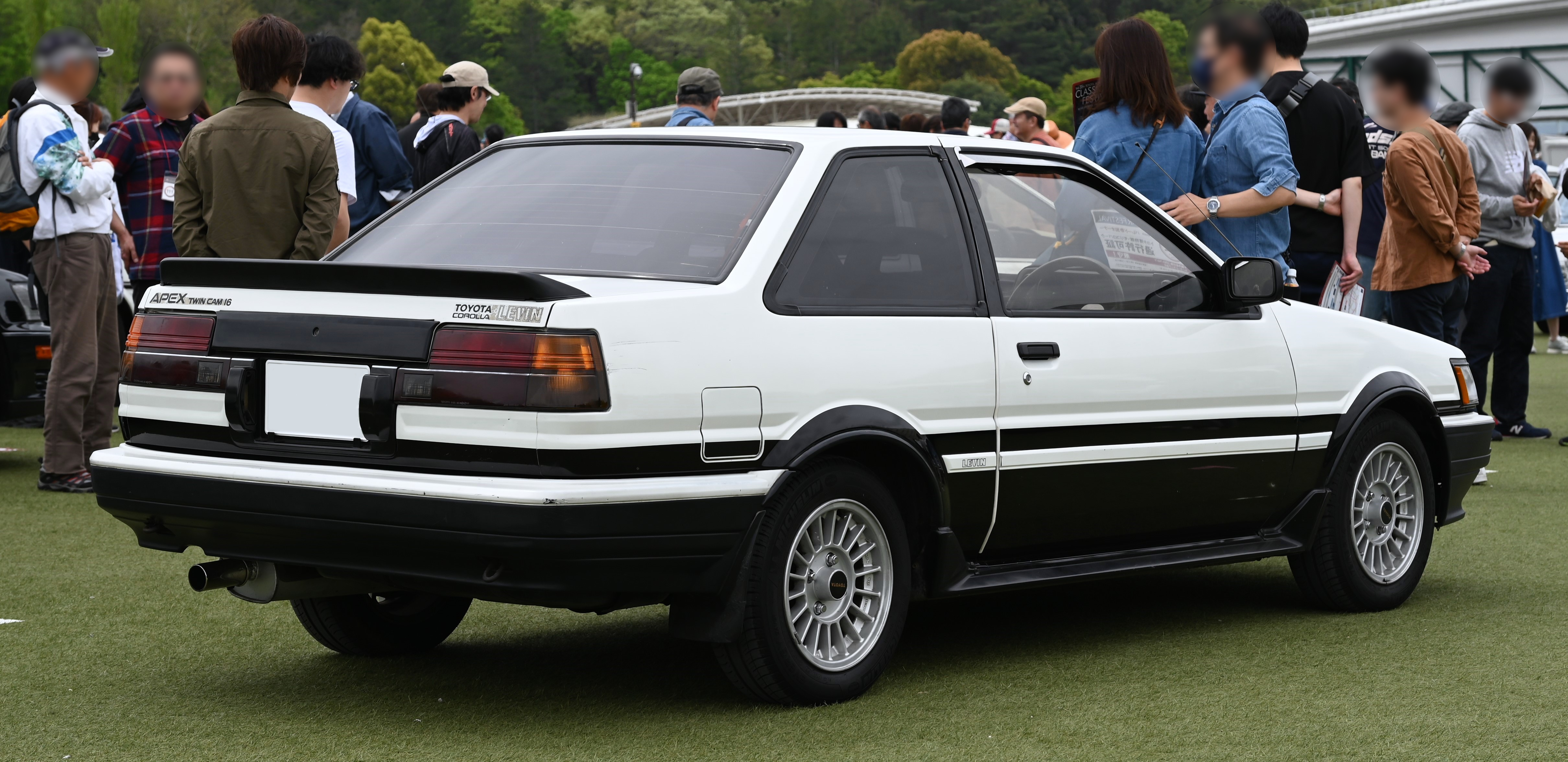
Corolla Levin GT-APEX coupé (AE86, facelift)

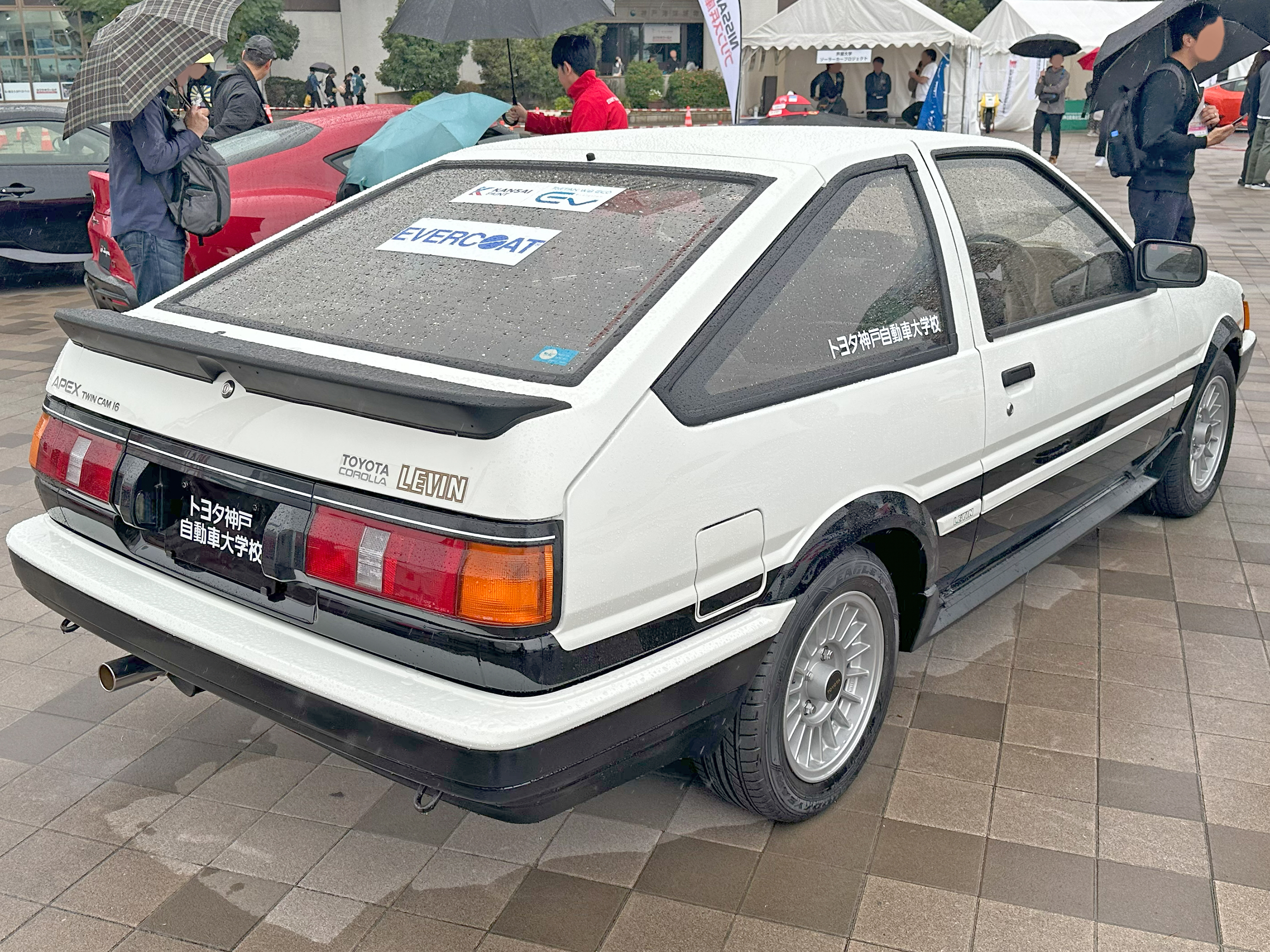
Corolla Levin GT-APEX liftback (AE86, facelift)
European and general export markets

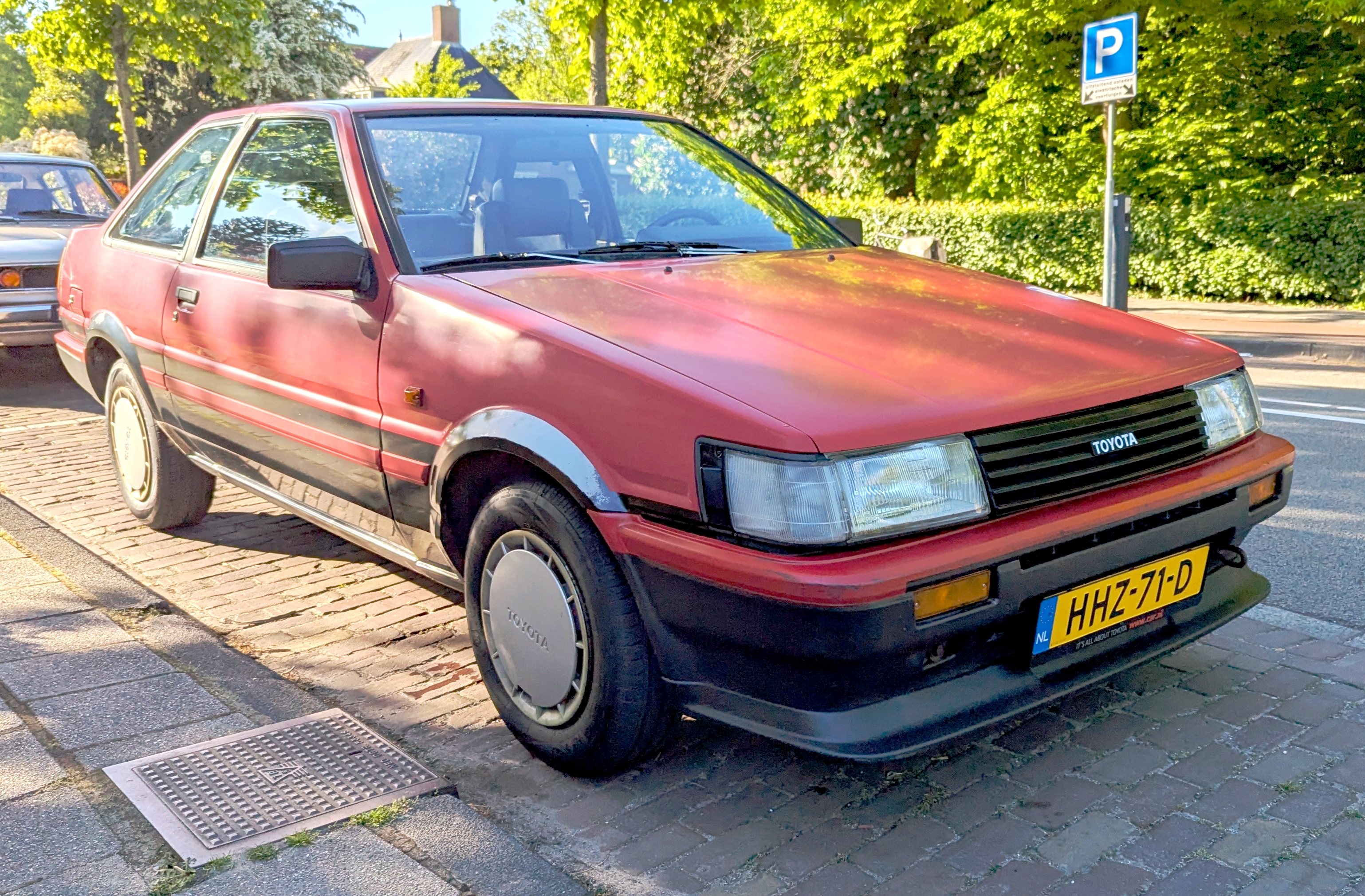
Corolla GT coupé (AE86, pre-facelift)

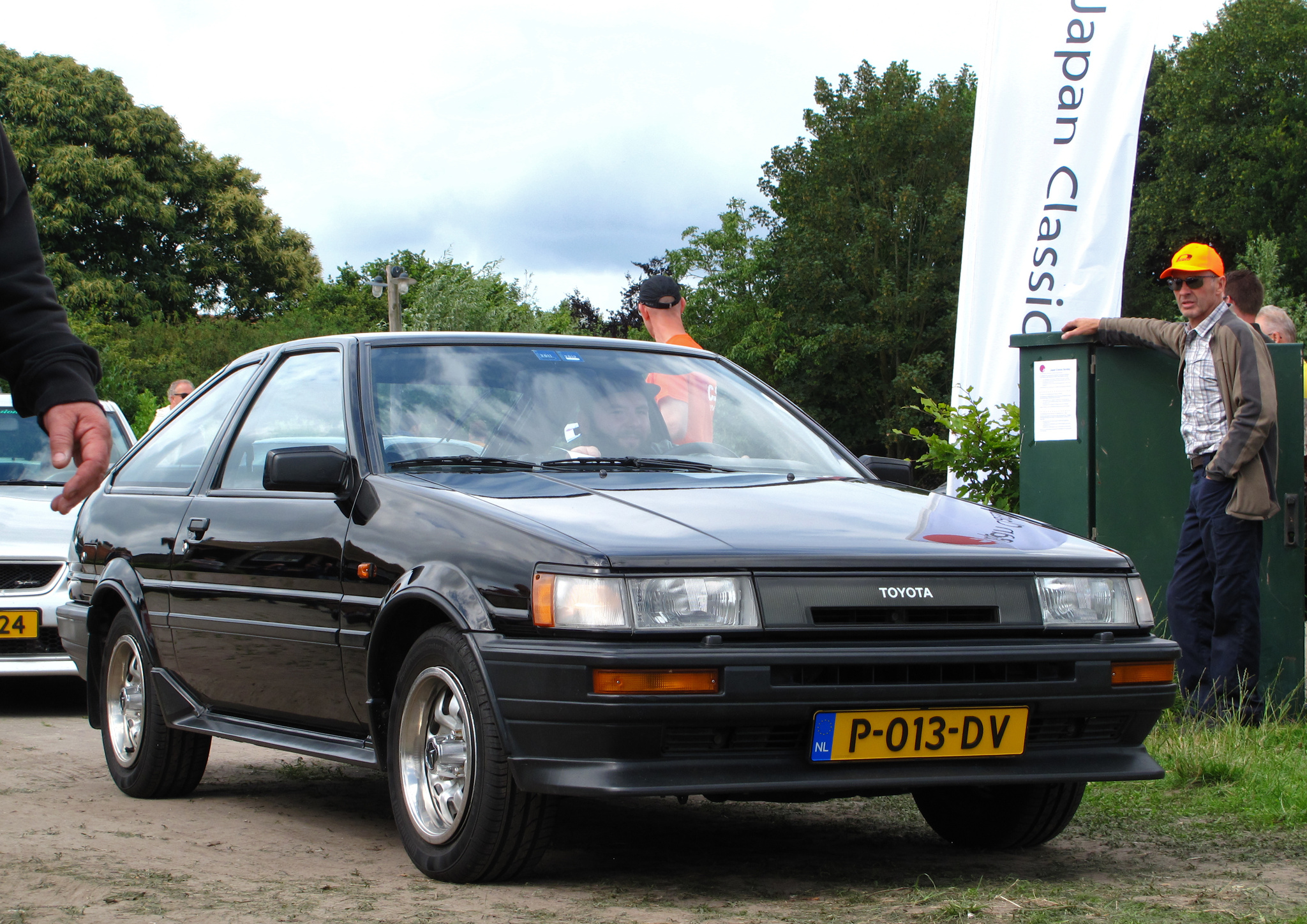
Corolla GT liftback (AE86, facelift)

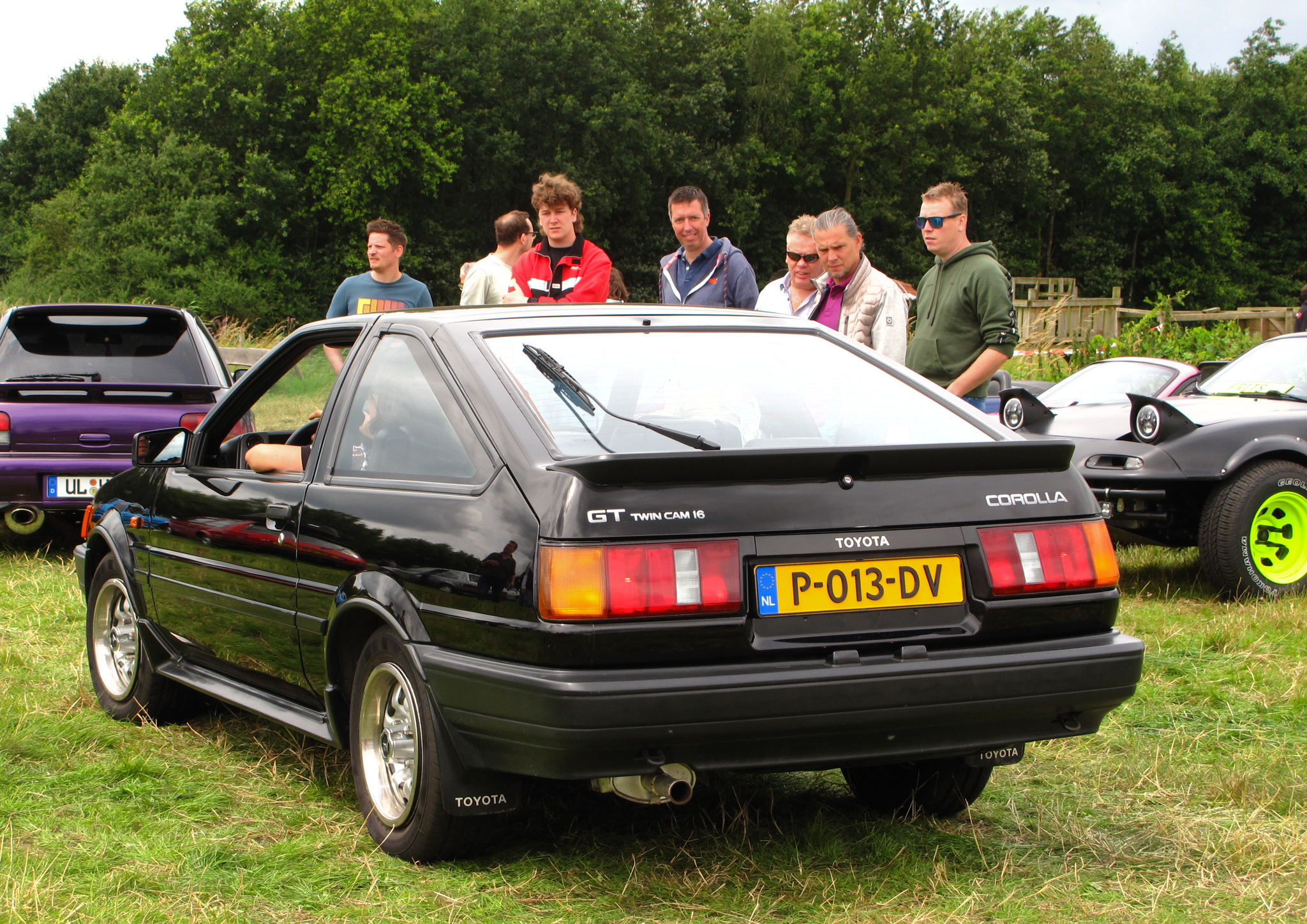
Corolla GT liftback (AE86, rear view)

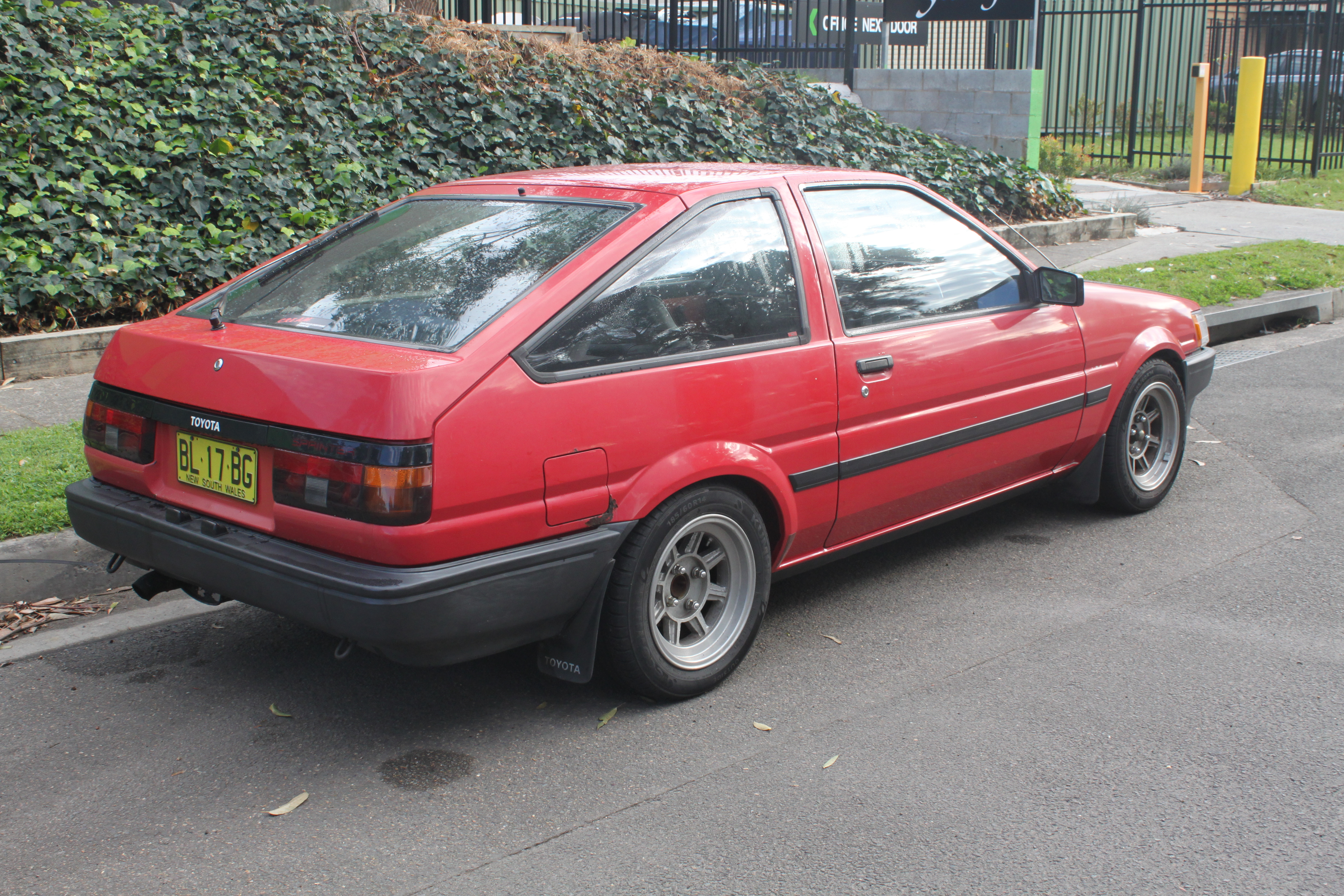
Australian market Sprinter liftback, based on general export model with Sprinter Trueno's taillights
North American markets

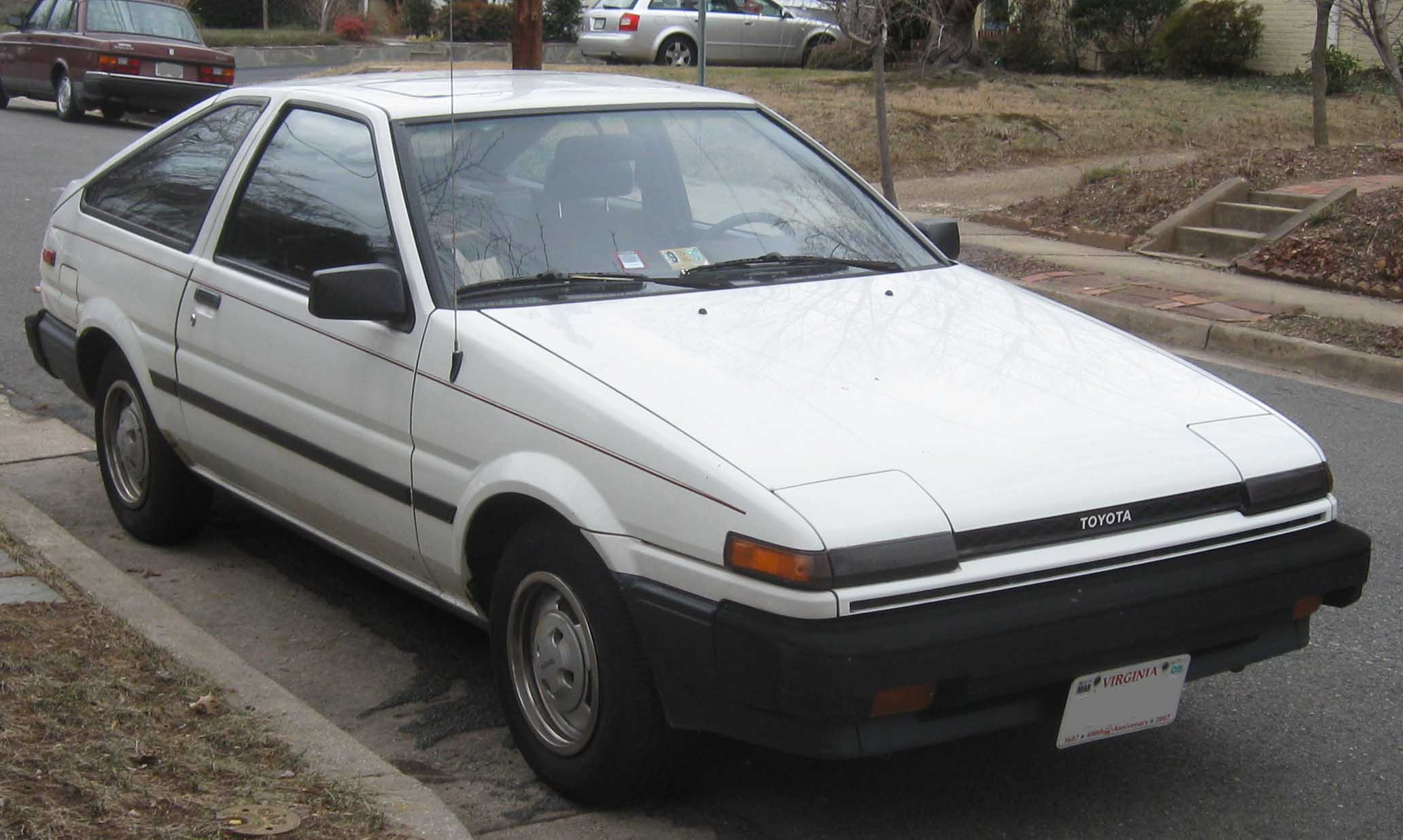
Corolla SR5 liftback (AE86), equipped with the Sprinter Trueno's front end and longer bumper; the Middle Eastern market version was based on this model

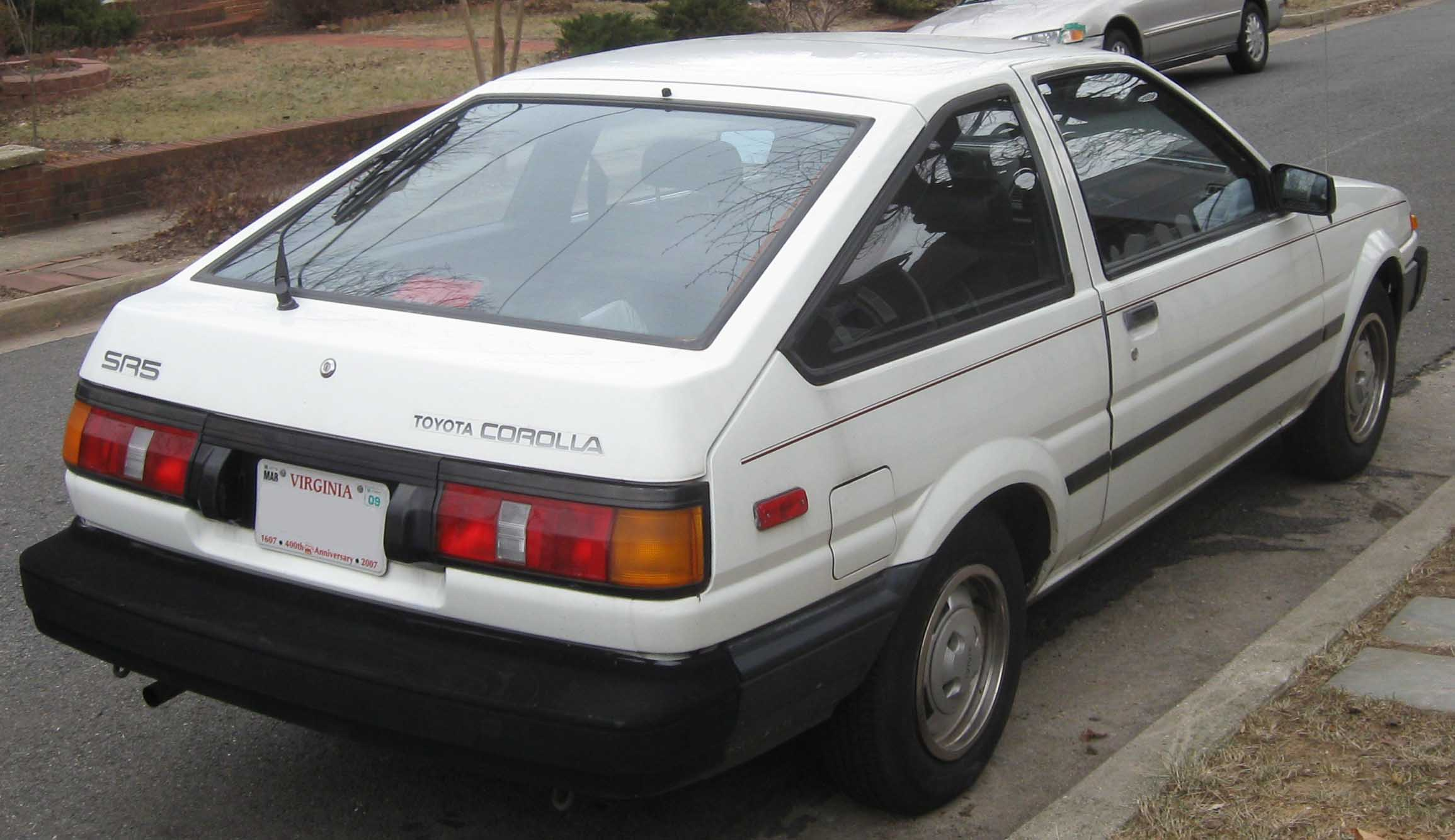
Corolla SR5 liftback (AE86, facelift) with new taillights and additional, third brake light

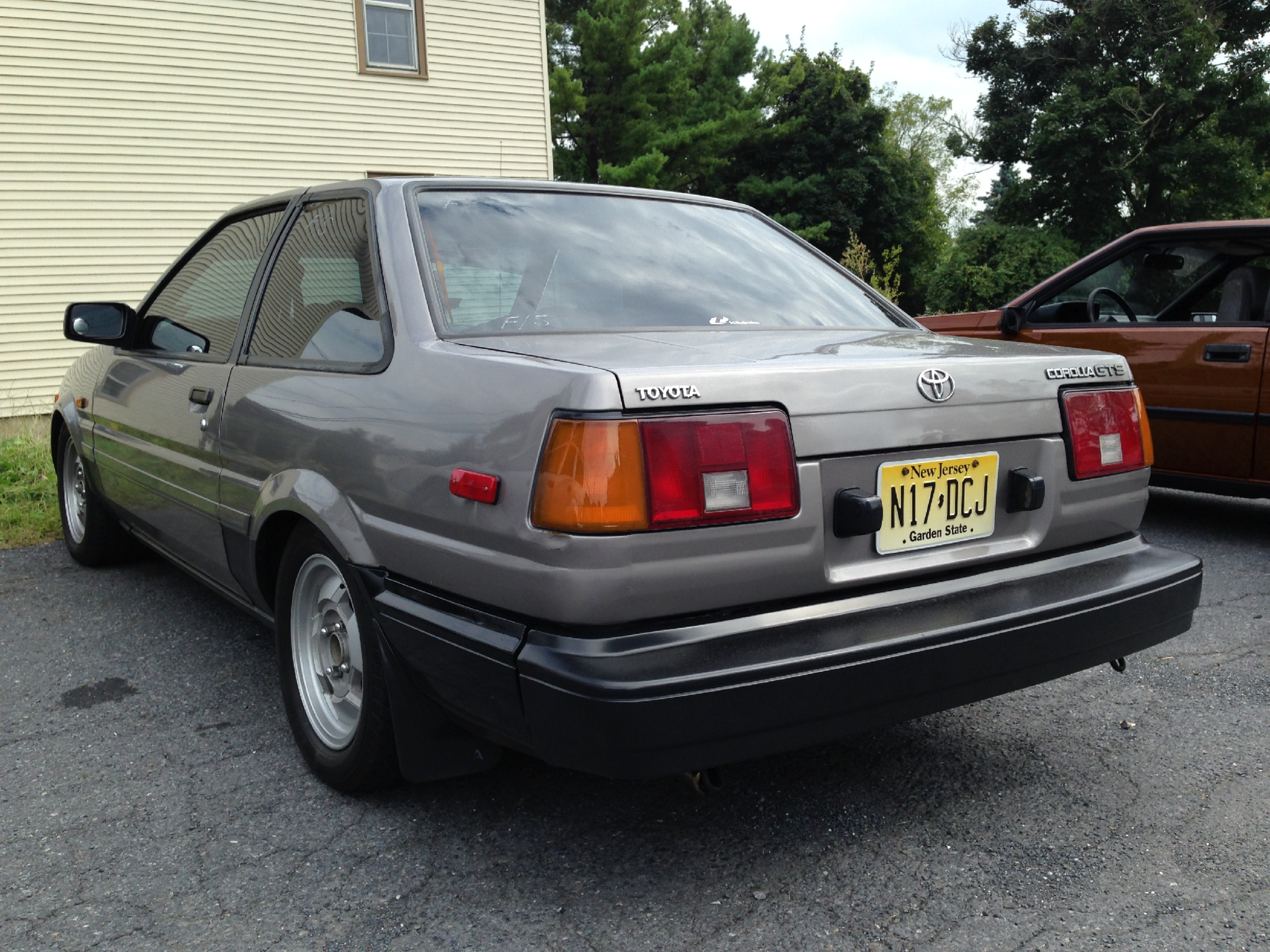
Corolla GT-S coupé with longer bumper and equipped with Corolla Levin's taillights (AE86, pre-facelift)

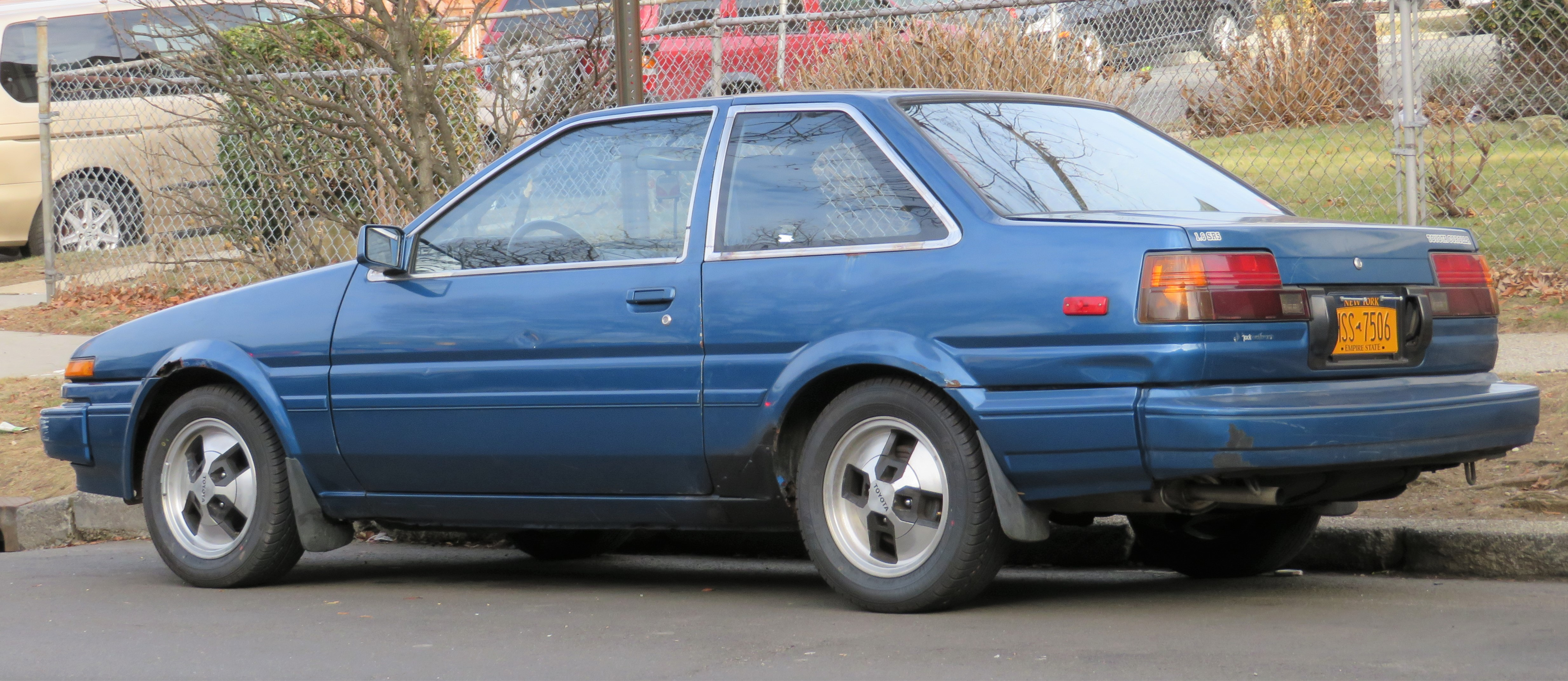
Corolla SR5 coupé (AE86, facelift)
Engines

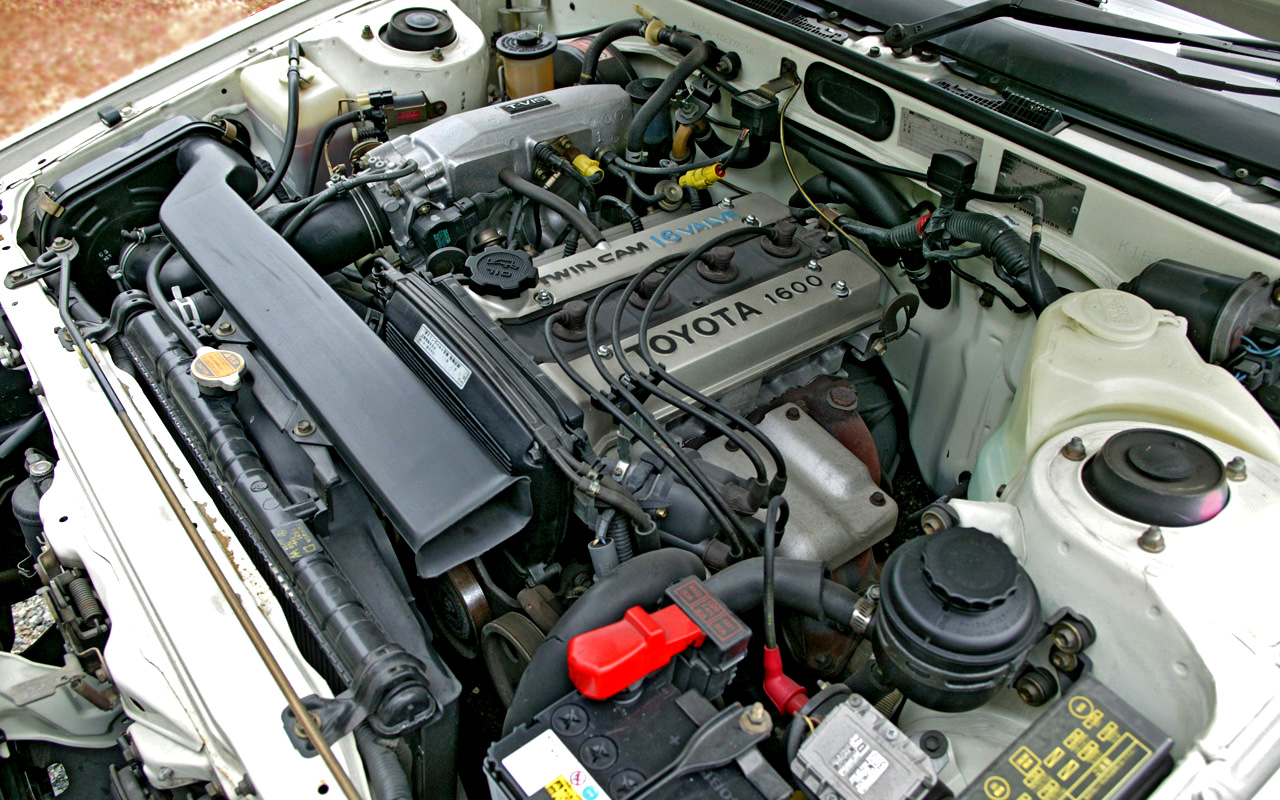
The early 4A-GEU engine, also known as "Bigport" or "Blue Top"

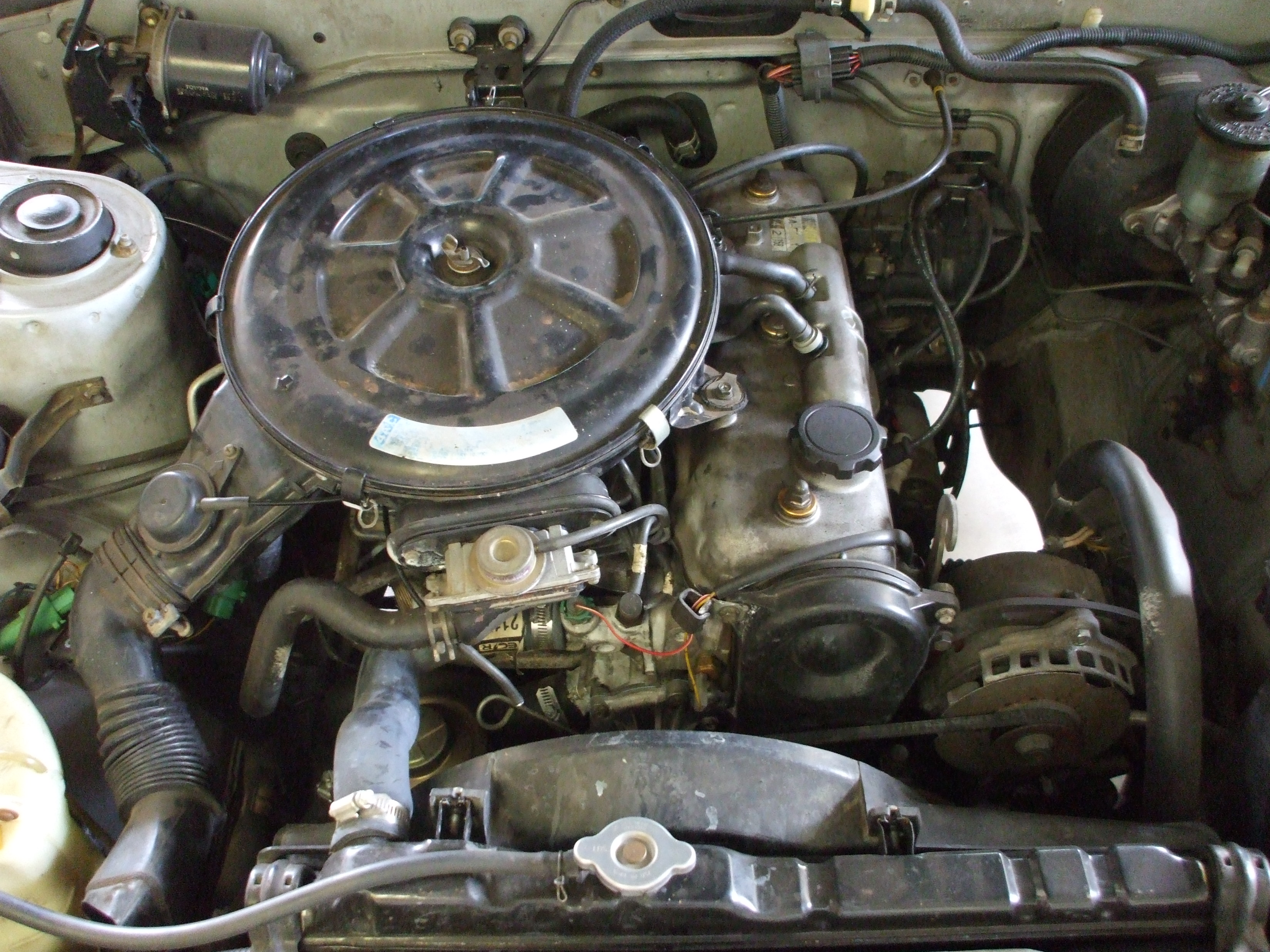
The 4A-C engine powered the lower specification of AE86 in North America, Australia, Switzerland and Sweden

== AE91 & AE92 Series (1987–1991) ==
Fifth generation
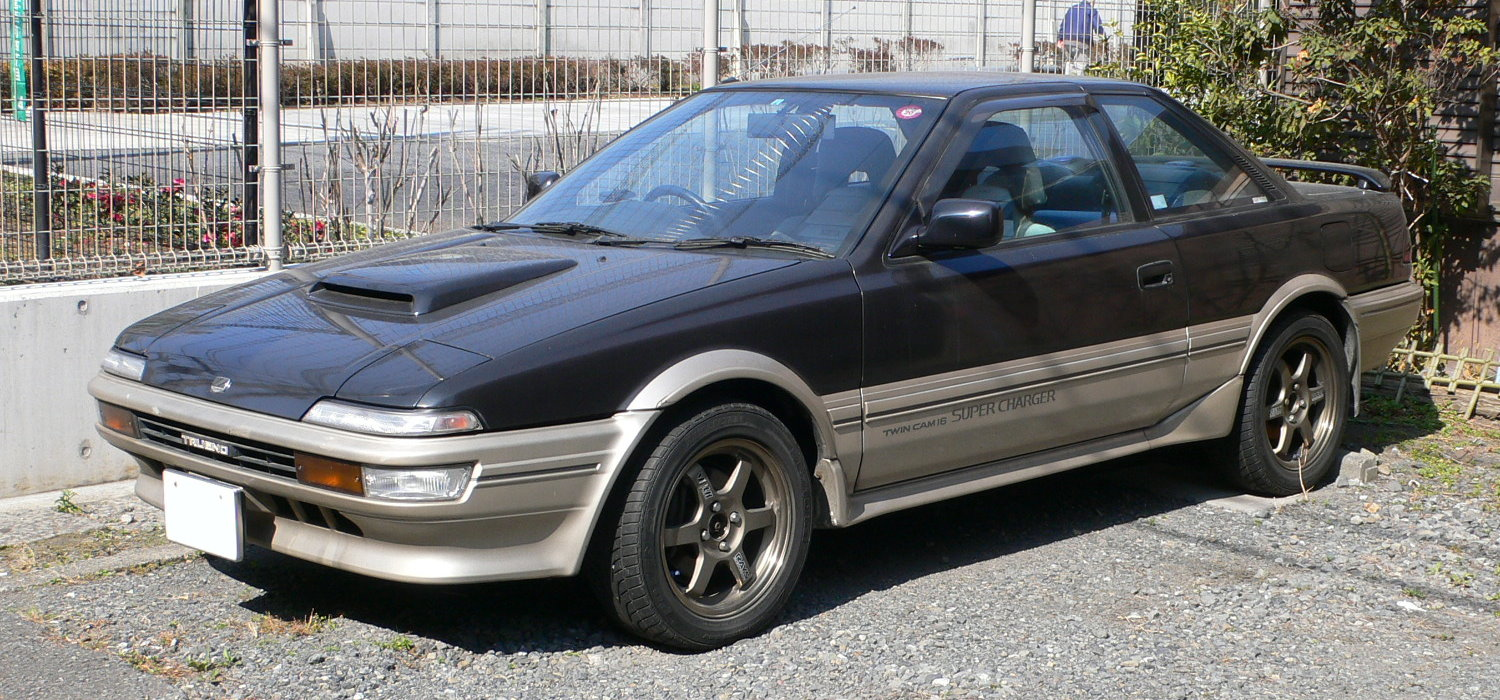
- Toyota Sprinter Trueno GT-Z (AE92, pre-facelift)

Overview
- Model code: AE91 (1.5 L); AE92 (1.6 L)
- Also called: Toyota Corolla Sport Coupe (North America)
- Production: 1987–1991
- Assembly: Japan: Susono, Shizuoka (Kanto Auto Works); Japan: Takaoka plant, Toyota City and Tahara plant, Tahara, Aichi (1987); Japan: Fukaura plant, Yokosuka, Kanagawa (1987–1991)

Body and chassis
- Body style: 2-door coupé
- Layout: Front engine, front-wheel drive
- Related: Toyota Corolla (E90); Toyota Sprinter (E90); Toyota Sprinter Carib (AE95G); Geo Prizm (E90); Holden Nova (LE/LF)

Powertrain
- Engine: 1.5 L 5A-F/FE/FHE I4; 1.6 L 4A-F/FE I4; 1.6 L 4A-GE I4; 1.6 L 4A-GZE I4 supercharger
- Transmission: 5-speed C50/C52/E52 manual; 3-speed A131L automatic; 4-speed A240L/A245E automatic

Dimensions
- Wheelbase: 2,430 mm (95.7 in)
- Length: 4,245 mm (167.1 in) (Corolla Levin); 4,255 mm (167.5 in) (Sprinter Trueno); 4,375 mm (172.2 in) (North America)
- Width: 1,660–1,665 mm (65.4–65.6 in); 1,680 mm (66.1 in) (GT-Z)
- Height: 1,260 mm (49.6 in) (North America); 1,300 mm (51.2 in)
- Curb weight: 910–1,070 kg (2,006.2–2,358.9 lb); 1,066–1,118 kg (2,350.1–2,464.8 lb) (North America)

The fifth generation of the Sprinter Trueno and Corolla Levin was introduced in May 1987. This generation had several changes from the previous generation, the most notable being the omission of the front-engine, rear-wheel drive (FR) layout of the previous generation in favour of a more conventional front-engine, front-wheel drive (FF) layout in-line with the other Corollas of the same generation. The 3-door liftback body style was dropped from this generation and was only produced in the 2-door coupé body style.

Like the preceding AE85/86 models of the previous generation, it had two different front end styles for each models. The Sprinter Trueno had a much more slanted front fascia with retractable pop-up headlights, while the Corolla Levin had a much more levelled bonnet line with fixed rectangular headlights. All of the engines produced during this generation were DOHC engines, as opposed to the SOHC engines used for the previous AE85 models. New to the sporty coupés was the supercharged GT-Z trim, which was the highest and fastest trim level of the AE92 at the time. This trim comes equipped with a supercharged version of the 4A-GE engine called the 4A-GZE, combined with an SC12 roots type supercharger and a top mounted intercooler fed by a GT-Z-specific bonnet scoop. This new engine had previously been used in the supercharged AW11 MR2 a year prior to the introduction of the E90 series Sprinter/Corolla.

For the AE91 series, the new G, L, Xi and Zi trim levels replaced the previous generation's GL, XL, SR and SE trim levels of the AE85 respectively. The G (Levin) and L (Trueno) featured the carburetted 1.5 L 5A-F engine while the better equipped Xi (Trueno) and Zi (Levin) featured the more economical fuel injected 1.5 L 5A-FE. The female-oriented XL Lissé and GL Lime models of the AE85 were carried over to the AE91 series and renamed as simply Lime (Levin) and Lissé (Trueno), all while retaining their same purpose. The Lime and Lissé were luxury variants of the G and L trims respectively, featuring unique upholstery, power steering, and an automatic transmission, among others.

Standard transmission for all models is 5-speed manual. The 3-speed automatic was offered in the more affordable L, Lime and Trueno, or 4-speed automatic for the middle grades G, Zi and Xi, as well as the high-performance GT, GTV and GT-APEX. The sole gearbox for the supercharged GT-Z is 5-speed manual. On the GT-APEX model, a semi-active suspension technology called Toyota Electronic Modulated Suspension (TEMS) and a digital cluster similar to the one found in the AE86 GT-APEX models were also offered as factory options.

The early models, known as the "Zenki" (前期) generation, were first introduced in 1987. The engines used during this generation were less powerful compared to the later models, with the naturally aspirated 4A-GE producing 120 PS (88 kW; 118 hp), the same power figures as the first generation 4A-GE in net output. The supercharged 4A-GZE on the other hand produces 145 PS (107 kW; 143 hp), the same power figures as the engine found in the supercharged AW11 MR2. The 4A-GE engines in this generation were late "bigport" versions, denoted by the red-and-black lettering on the cam covers. These engines (aside from the 4A-GZE) retained the T-VIS intake system from the early "bigport" versions found in the previous AE86 models, among other minor changes. The carbureted 5A-F produced 85 PS (63 kW; 84 hp), while the fuel injected 5A-FE produces 9 PS (7 kW; 9 hp) more power than the 5A-F engine. These early models also had differently styled front-ends, with the front bumpers of the Levin having a different design with a small upper grille that extends to both ends of the bumper. The Trueno's front bumper design resembles that of the preceding facelifted AE86, but with the combo lights placed between the headlights and bumpers. In early 1989, a limited-edition model based on Levin GT-APEX called the Black Levin 204 was added to the line up, with a limited run of 520 units. The car was painted with export specification 204 code black metallic paint, yellow halogen bulb headlights and standard electric moonroof for 240 units only.

In May 1989, a minor facelift occurred as well as changes in engine performance, also known as the "Kouki" (後期) generation. Major rework was done to the 4A-GE engine, replacing the twin-runner T-VIS intake system with a single-runner intake featuring smaller intake ports, hence the nickname "smallport". These engines are denoted by the all-red lettering found in the cam covers. Along with a couple of upgrades (mainly to the engine internals), this version produces 20 PS (15 kW) more power than the previous iteration, with 140 PS (103 kW) in naturally aspirated form and 165 PS (121 kW; 163 hp) in supercharged 4A-GZE form. The minor tweaks also upped the compression ratio from 9.4:1 to 10.3:1 (NA models) and from 8:1 to 8.9:1 (supercharged models). Trim grades were also revised, removing the AE92 GT-V from the lineup and renaming the AE91 L to the AE91 G. Furthermore, the AE91 Xi and Zi trims were renamed as the XS and ZS. Carbureted engines were retired during this generation; with the carbureted 5A-F engine no longer being offered. This change eliminated all carbureted engines from the lineup, with the G, Lime and Lissé trims of the AE91 now having the revised fuel injected 5A-FE, while the XS and ZS have the 5A-FHE EFI-S engine producing 105 PS (77 kW; 104 hp). The front-ends have been slightly restyled; the front bumper of the Levin now had a shorter upper grille that did not extend to both ends with two side markers on each corner while the Trueno carried a similar change but with larger combo lights above the bumper and below the headlights. A new limited-edition model with different options was offered for the Trueno GT-APEX in January 1990 called the GT-APEX Limited, with a production run of 2000 units. It was later offered to both the Levin and Trueno in January 1991 and was limited to 1000 units. The black body paint was changed to 205 code and is available for the GT-APEX trim.

Toyota tuning specialist TOM'S also released 40 units of a complete car based on the Kouki AE92 Levin GT, all with a 5-speed manual transmission. These Levins featured various modifications, including performance shock absorbers, Recaro seats, a Personal three-spoke steering wheel, Rays C3 wheels, a strut bar and an upgraded audio system.

For the North American market, the GT-S and SR-5 AE92 coupés came in the same configuration as the previous AE86 models, being based on the Trueno with retractable headlights. Like the previous generation, it had longer bumpers in the front and rear in order to comply with US federal regulations. The US-market AE92 coupés never had the option of a supercharged 4A-GZE engine, however (though it was offered on the supercharged AW11 MR2 in that region), as the GT-S only came with a naturally aspirated version of the late "bigport" 4A-GE engine producing 117 PS (86 kW; 115 hp), 3 PS (2 kW; 3 hp) less than the Japanese-market late "bigport" 4A-GE engine. Other differences include the use of a MAF sensor on US-market engines as opposed to a MAP sensor on Japanese-market engines. The SR-5 came with a carbureted 4A-F engine producing 95 PS (70 kW; 94 hp). The GT-S was only available with a 5-speed manual transmission while the SR-5 was available with a 3-speed automatic transmission option. The 1990 model year updated the 4A-GE engine of the GT-S to the "smallport" version, producing 132 PS (97 kW; 130 hp). Also, the carbureted 4A-F engine of the SR-5 was replaced with a fuel injected 4A-FE engine producing 103 PS (76 kW; 102 hp), eliminating all carbureted engines from the lineup.

A general export model known as the Corolla Coupé was exported to select markets such as Chile, Hong Kong or Malta. Like its North American counterpart, it is based on the Trueno, complete with its retractable headlights. The bumpers themselves (which are the same pre-facelift bumpers as found on the Japanese model Trueno) had non-illuminating orange lens that are placed into the area where the cornering lamps are, similar to the facelifted AE85 Trueno models in Japan. The coupé was only offered in the XL trim with a carbureted 1.6 L 4A-F engine, mated to either a 5-speed manual or 3-speed automatic option.

Sprinter Trueno

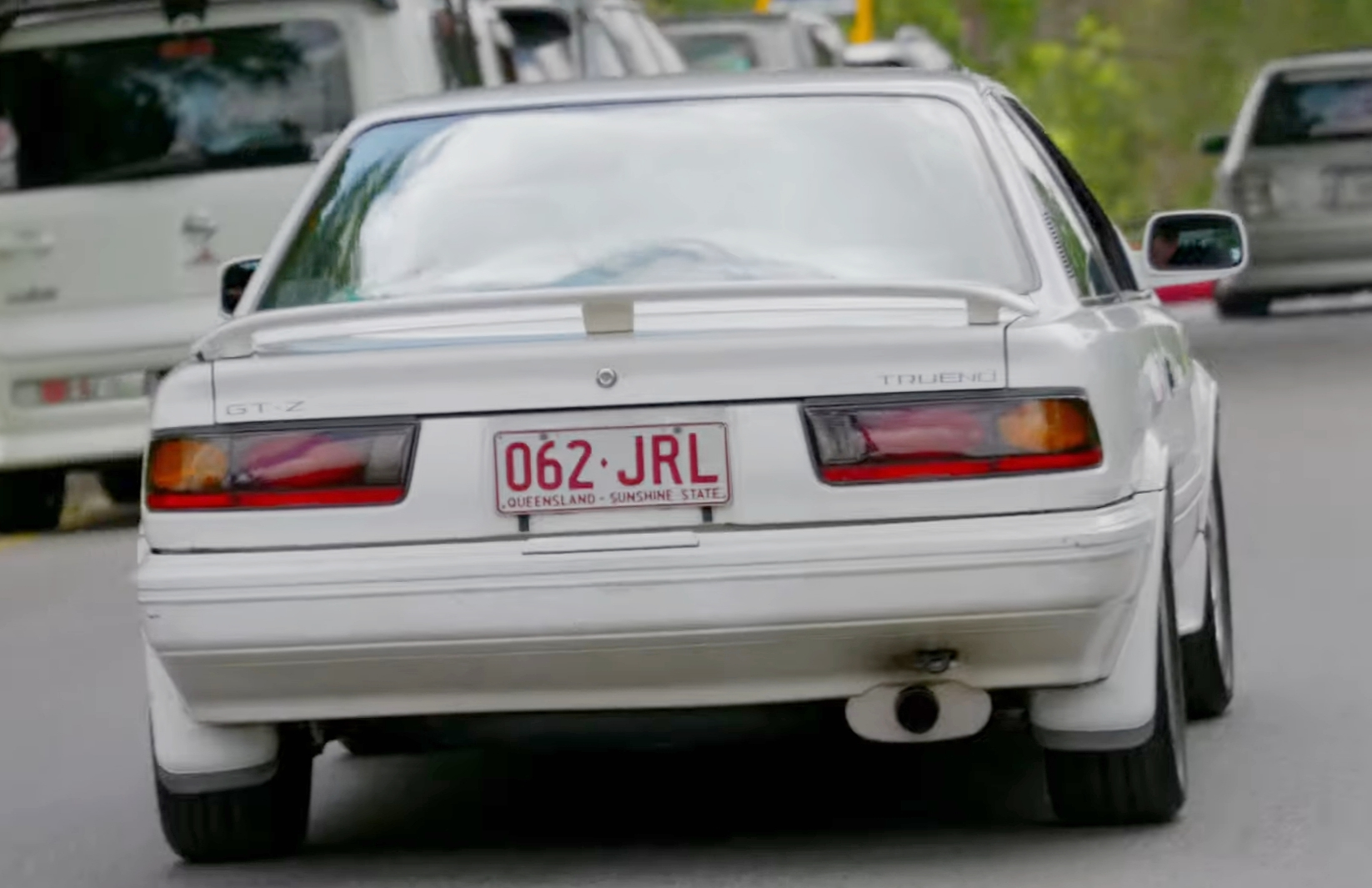
Sprinter Trueno GT-Z (AE92, pre-facelift)

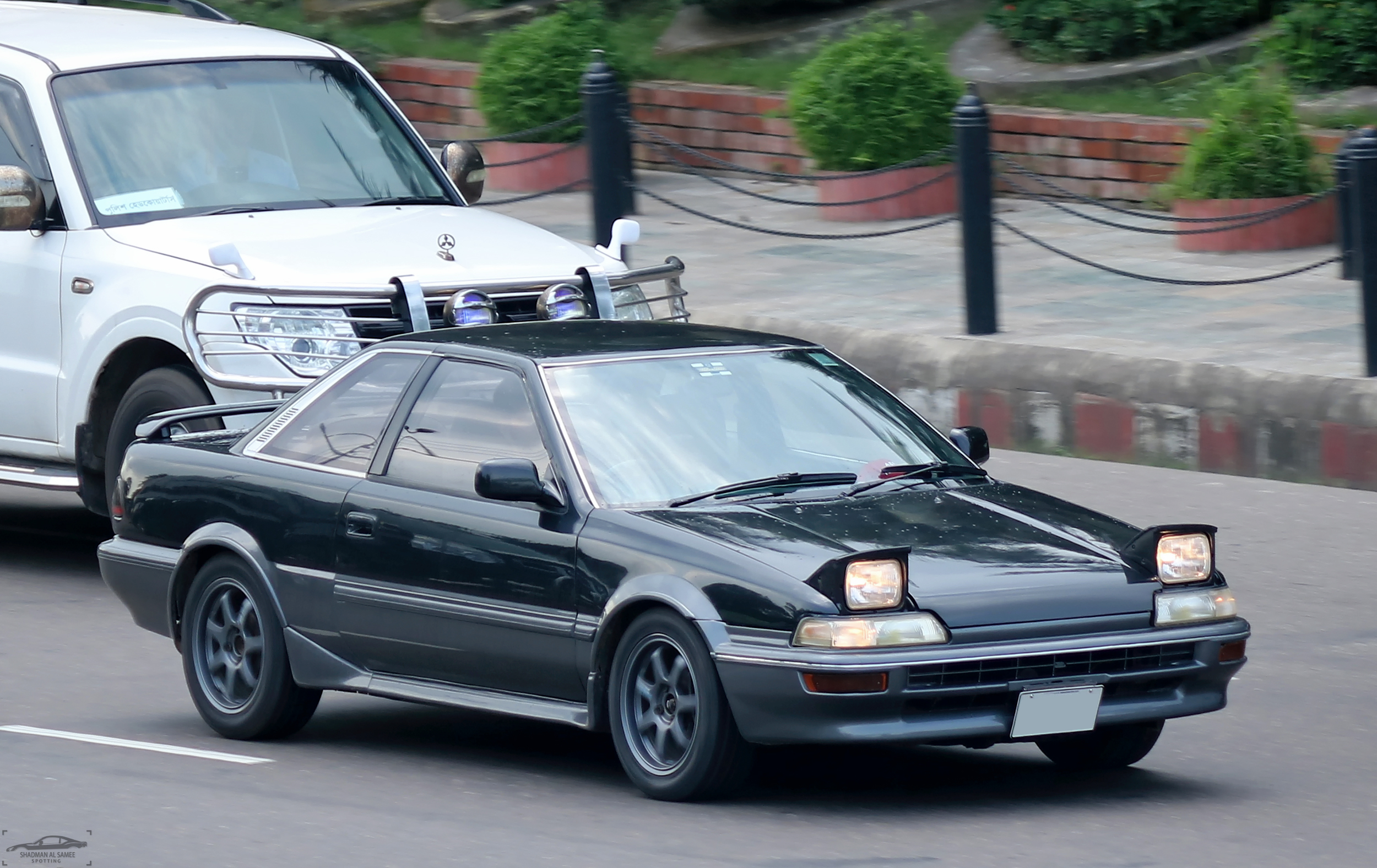
Sprinter Trueno (AE91, facelift)

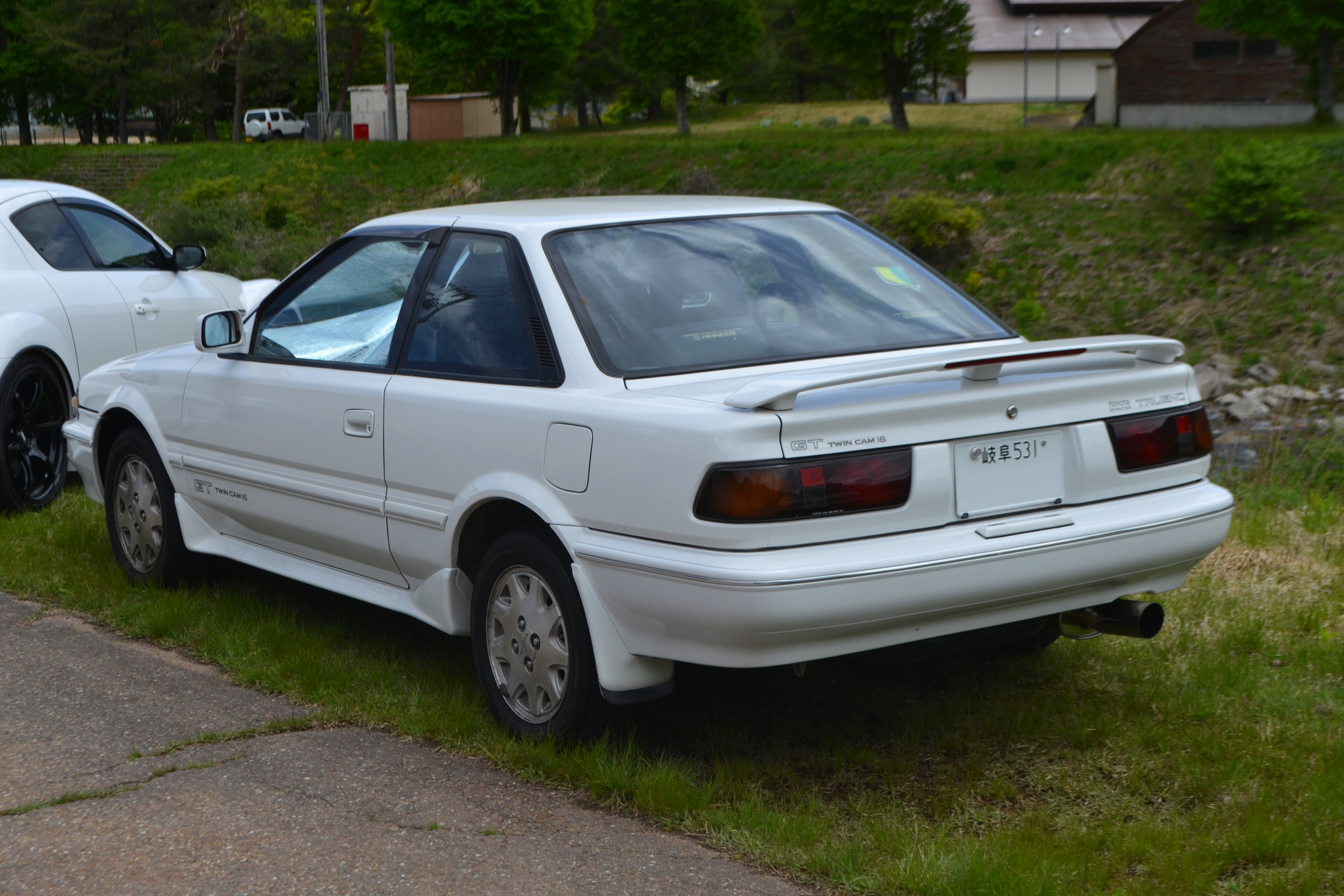
Sprinter Trueno GT (AE92, facelift)
Corolla Levin

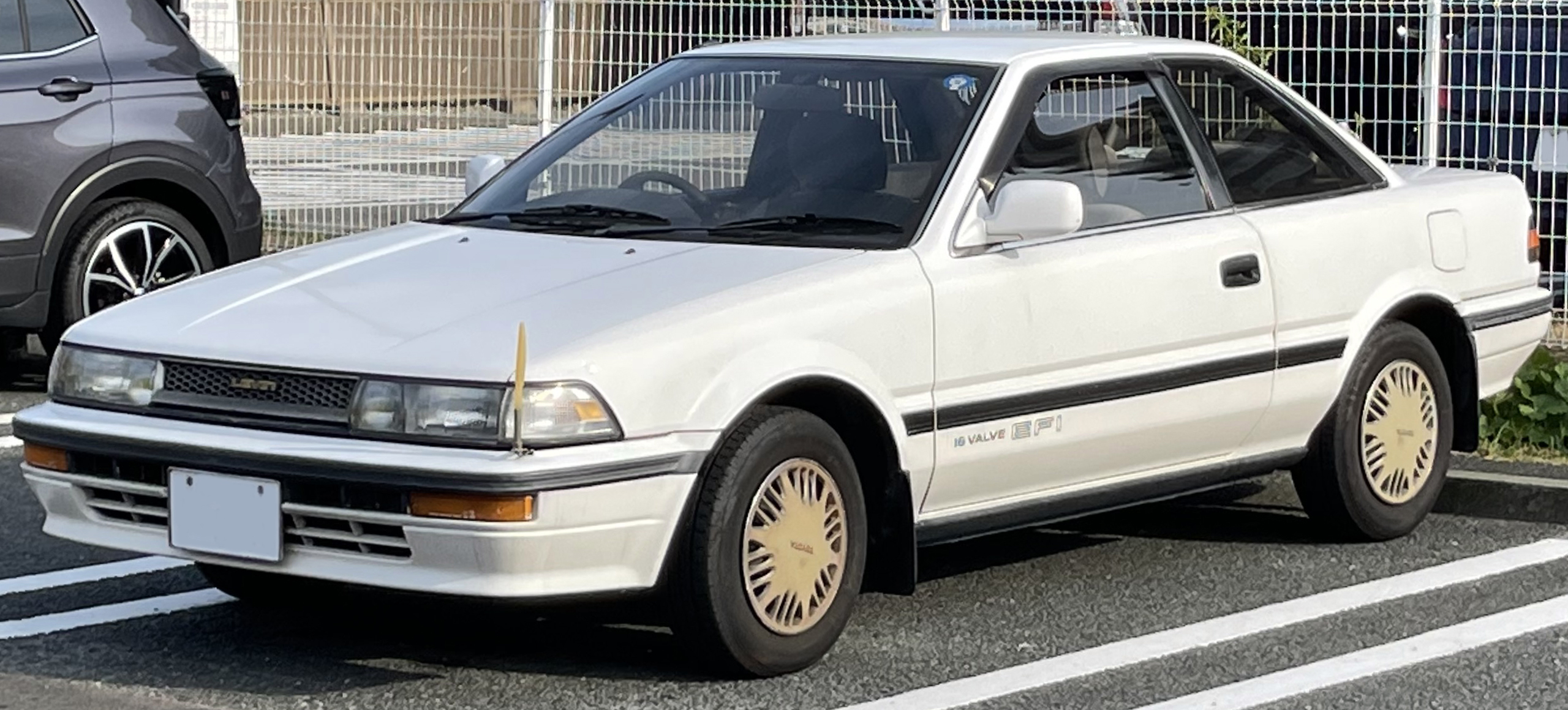
Corolla Levin Zi (AE91, pre-facelift)

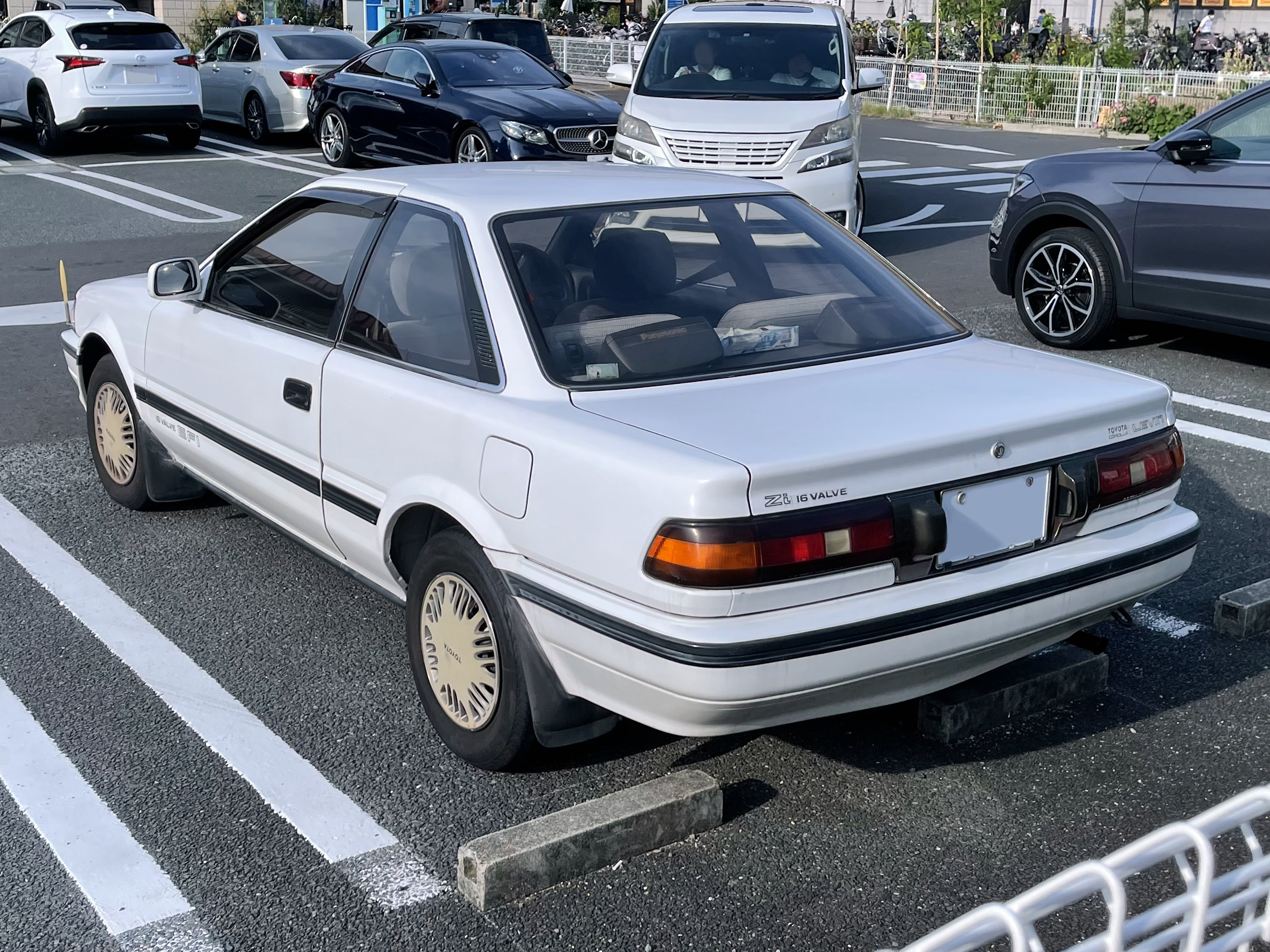
Corolla Levin Zi (AE91, pre-facelift)

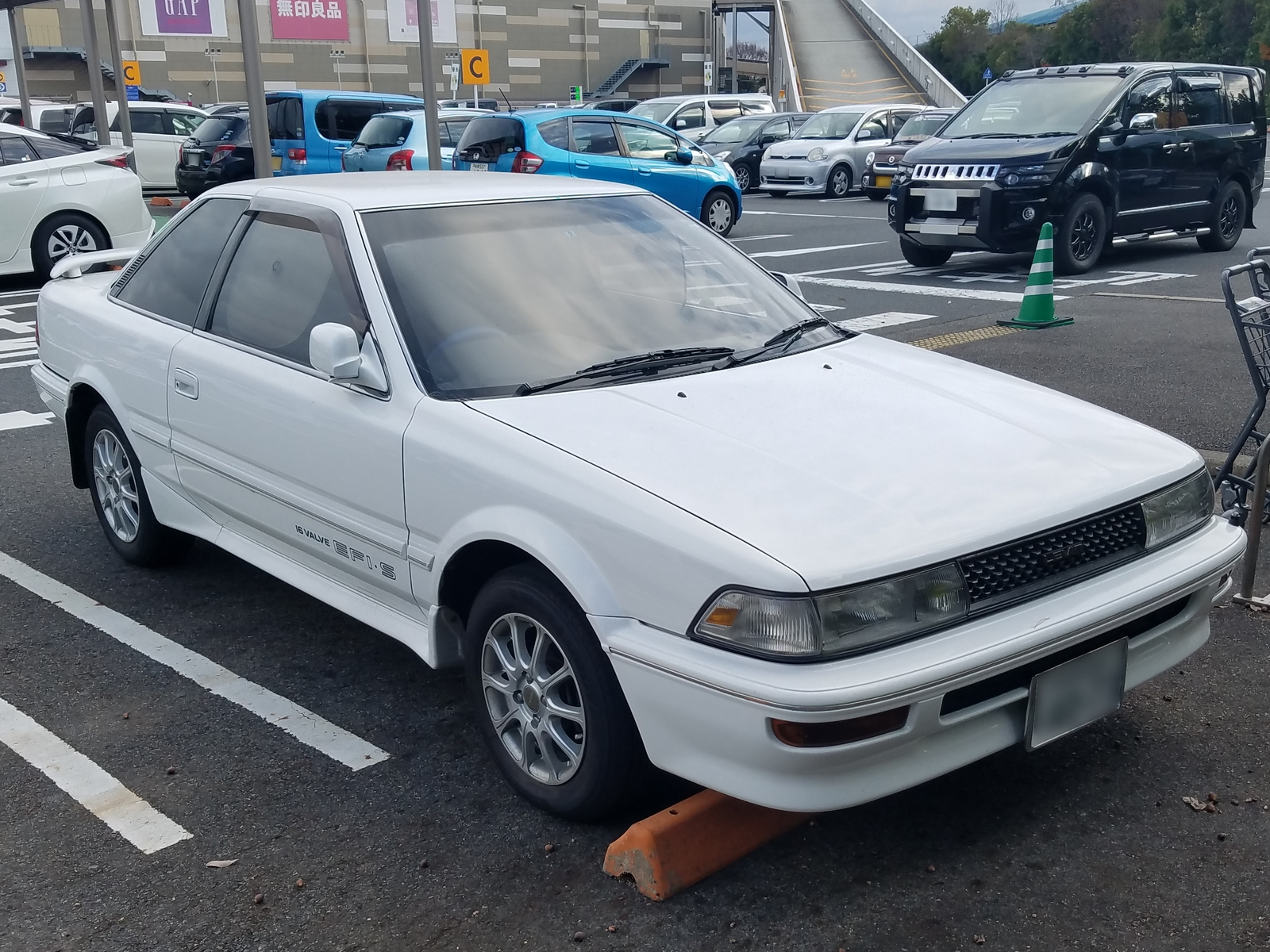
Corolla Levin ZS (AE91, facelift)

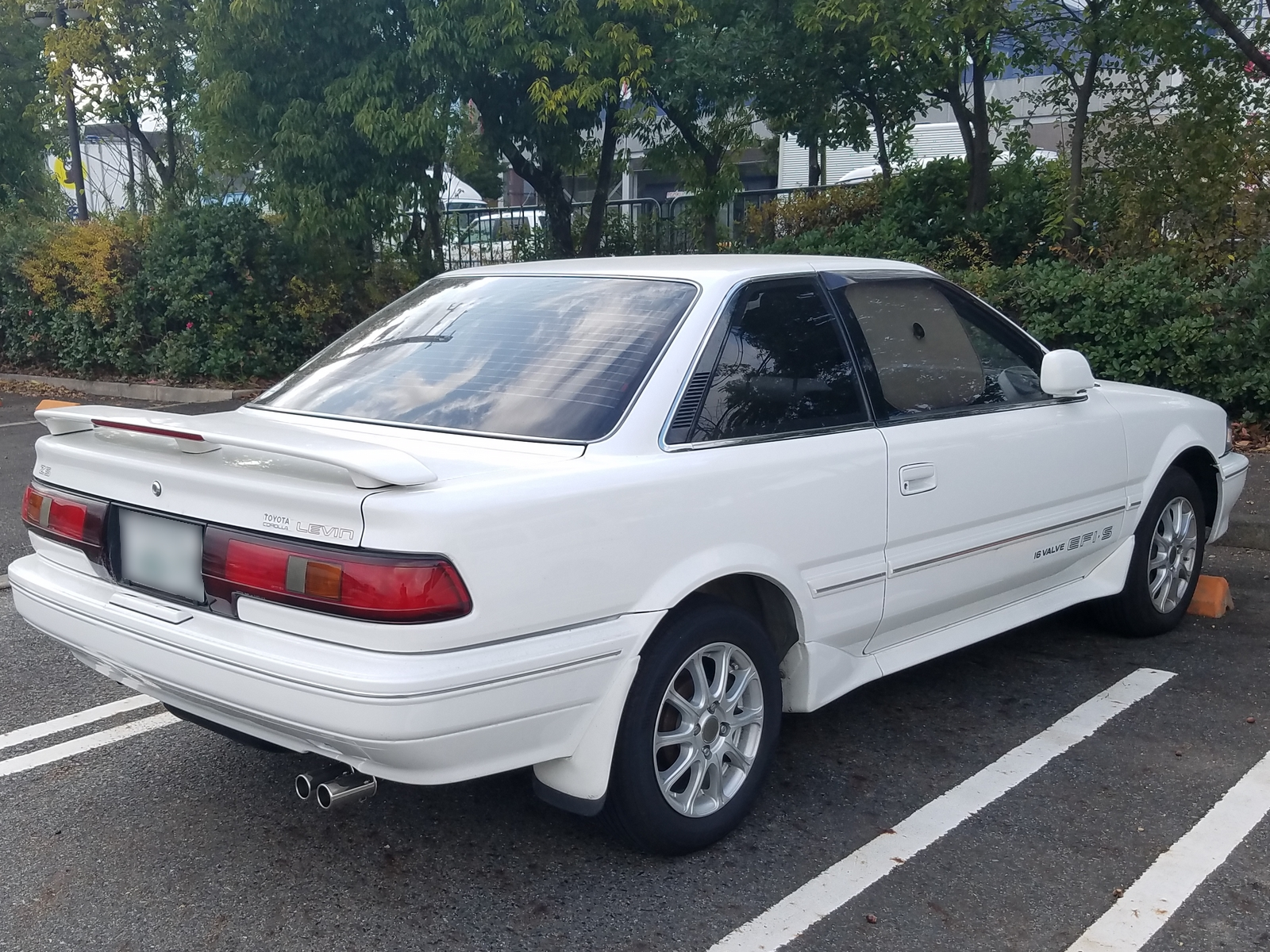
Corolla Levin ZS (AE91, facelift)

Export version

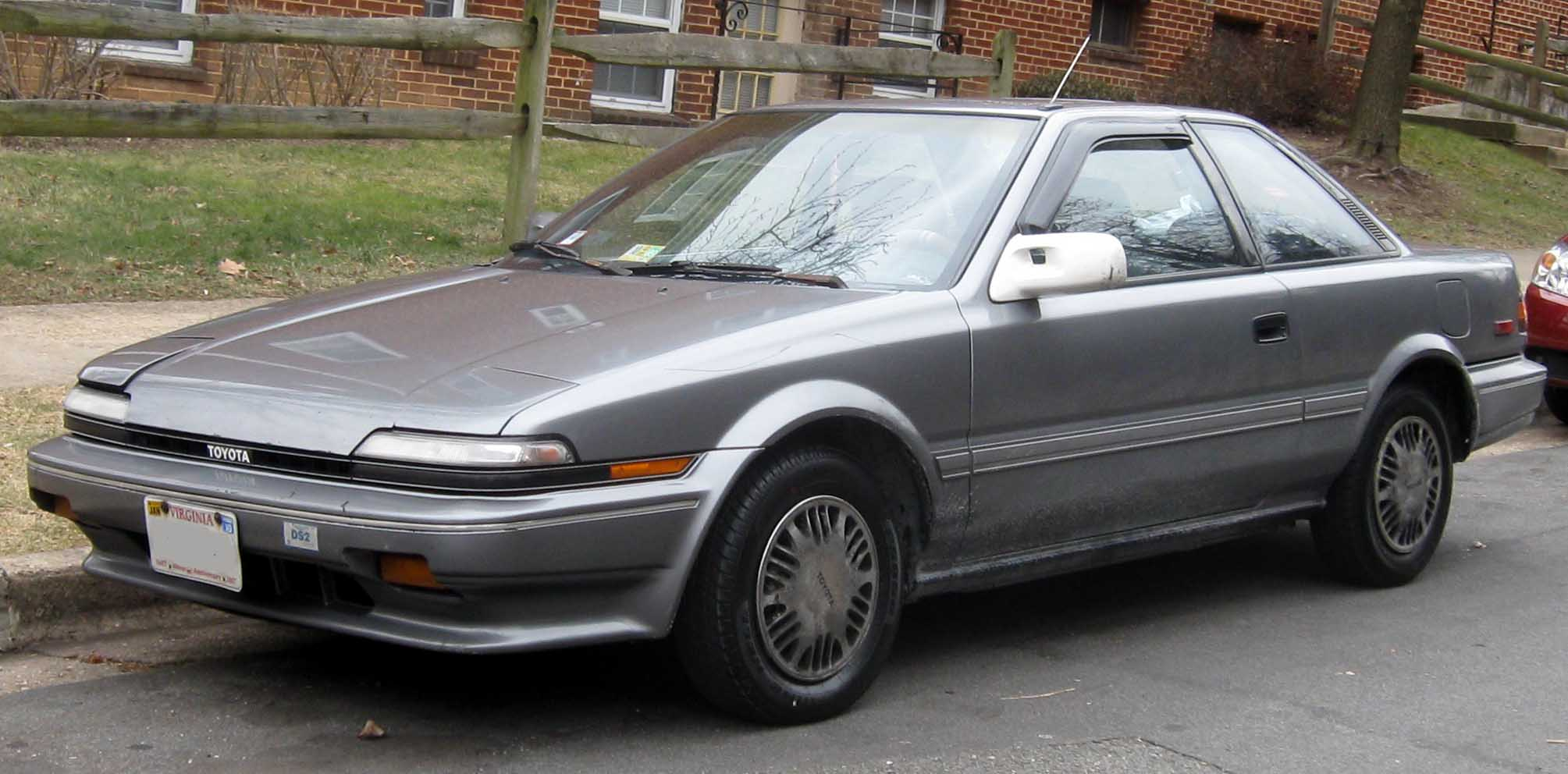
North American market Corolla Sport Coupe SR-5 (AE92)

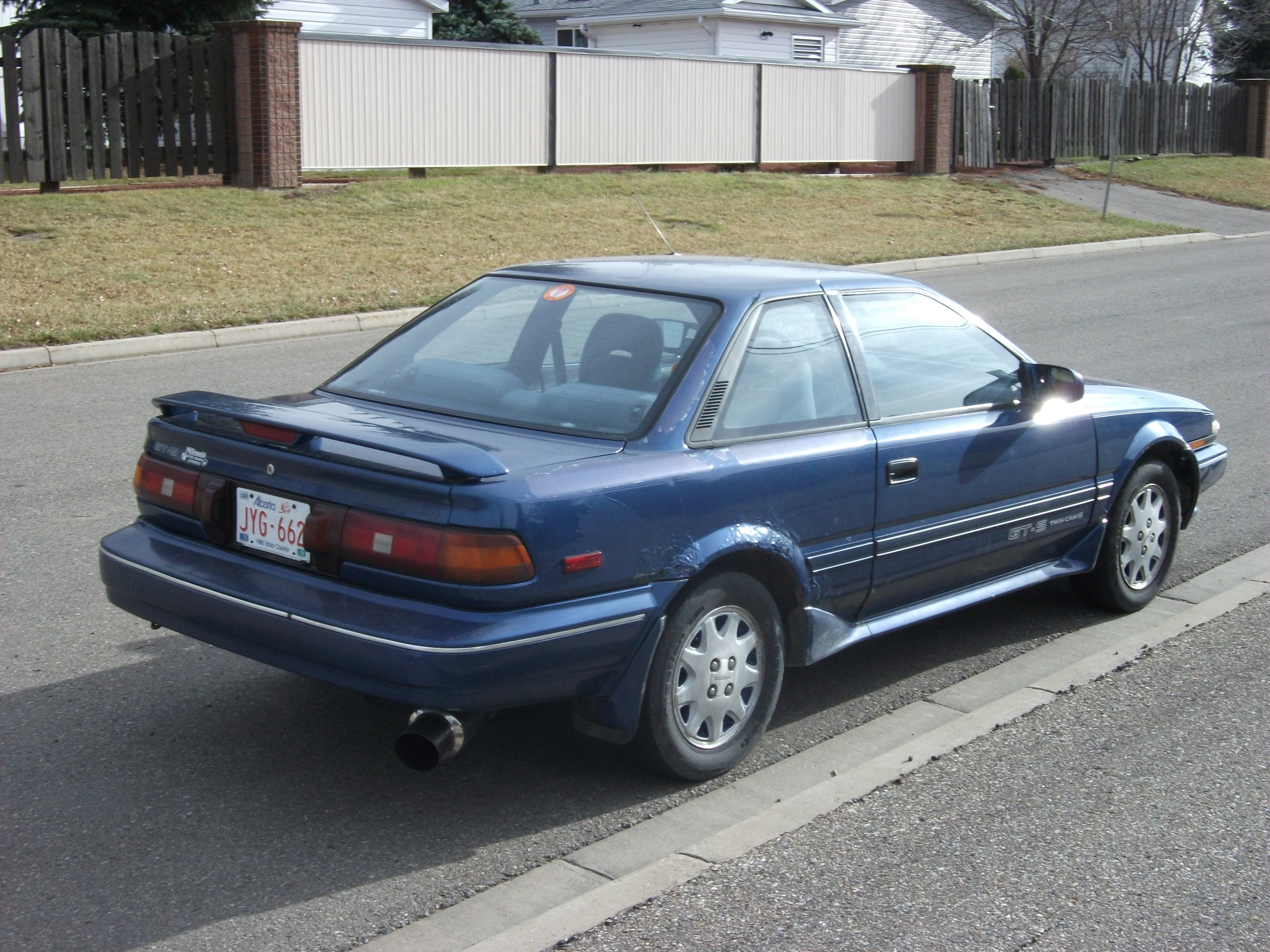
North American market Corolla Sport Coupe GT-S (AE92)

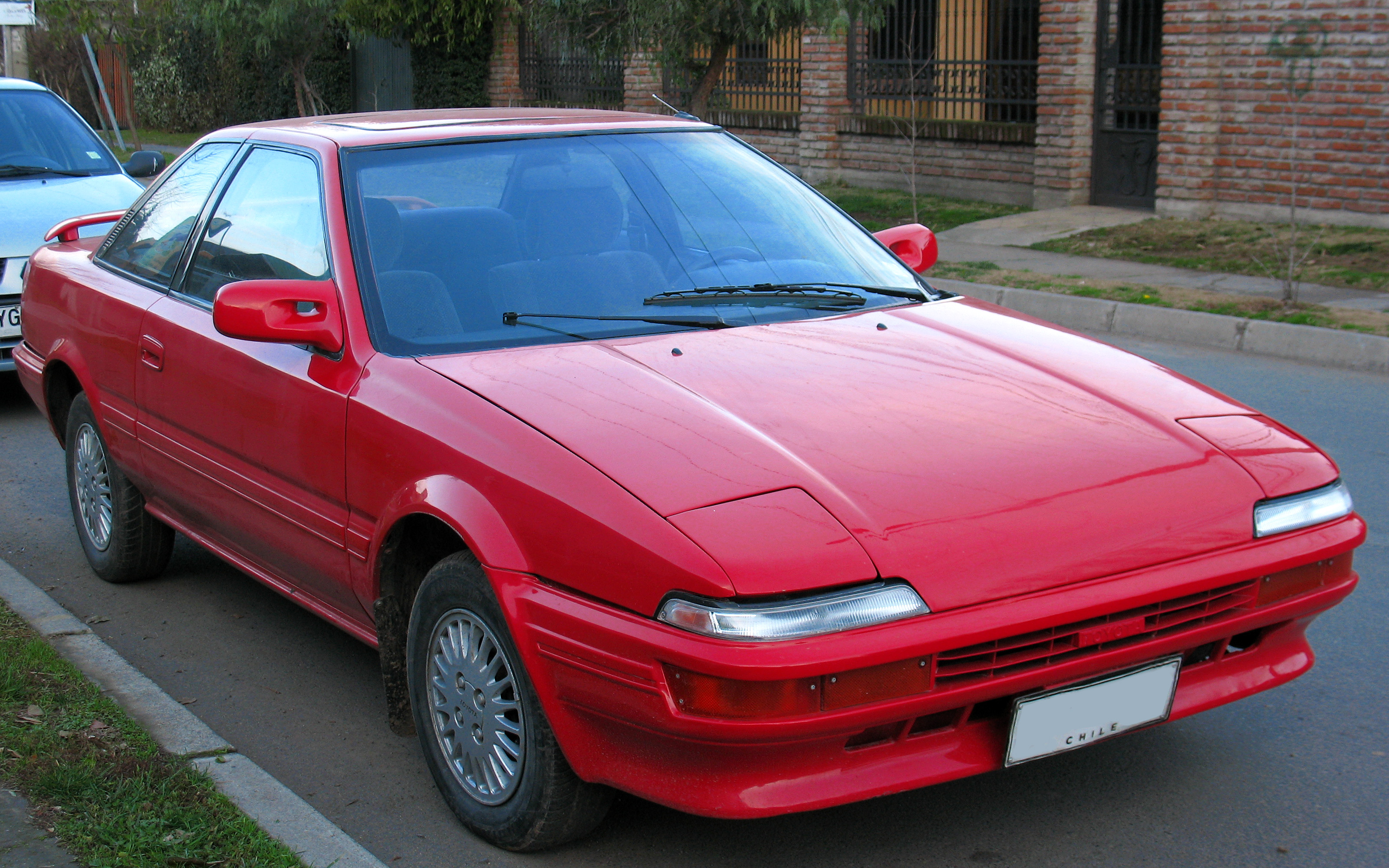
General export market Corolla XL coupé (AE92, Chile), sold in select markets outside Japan and North America
Engines

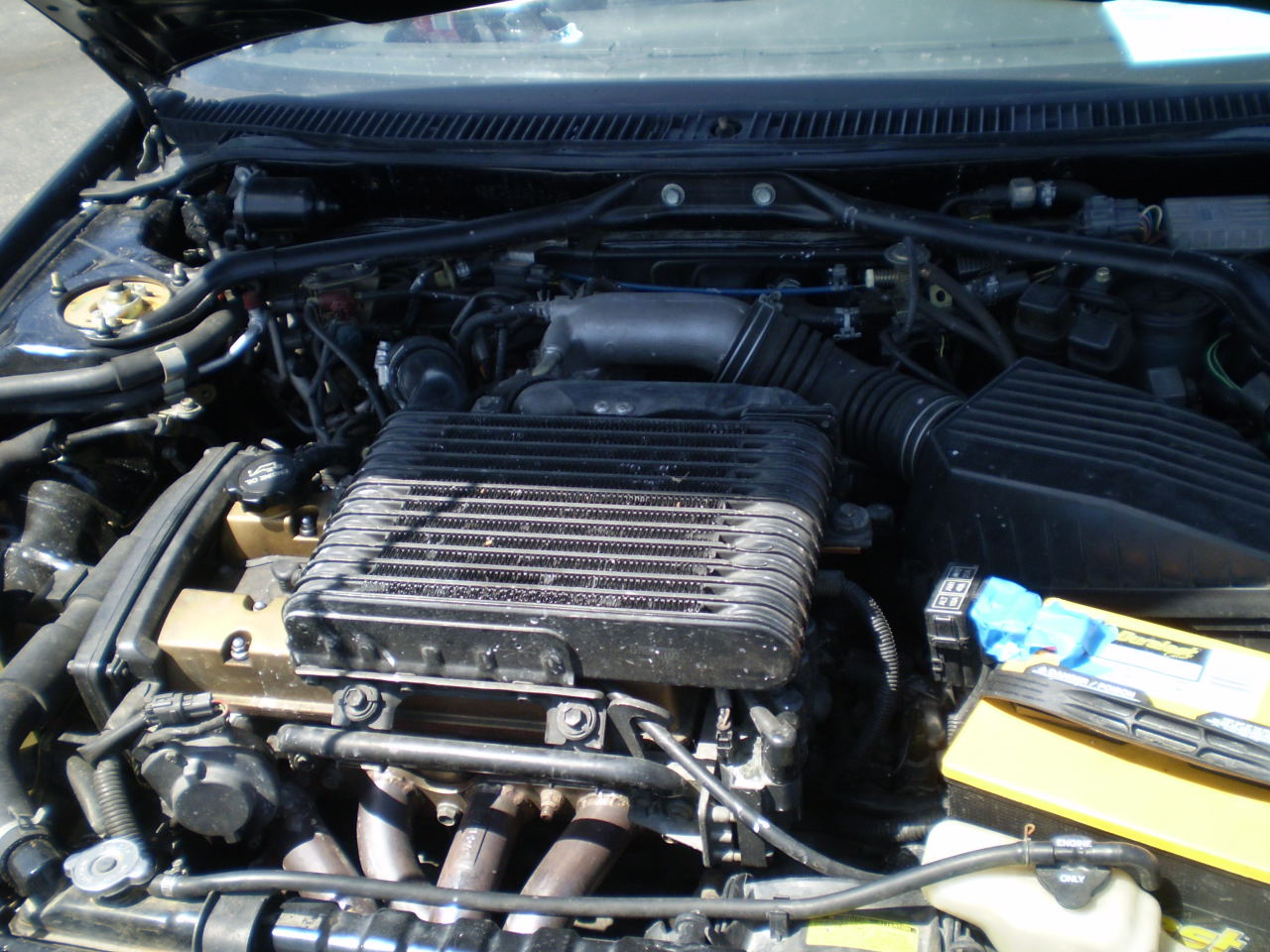
The supercharged 4A-GZE engine

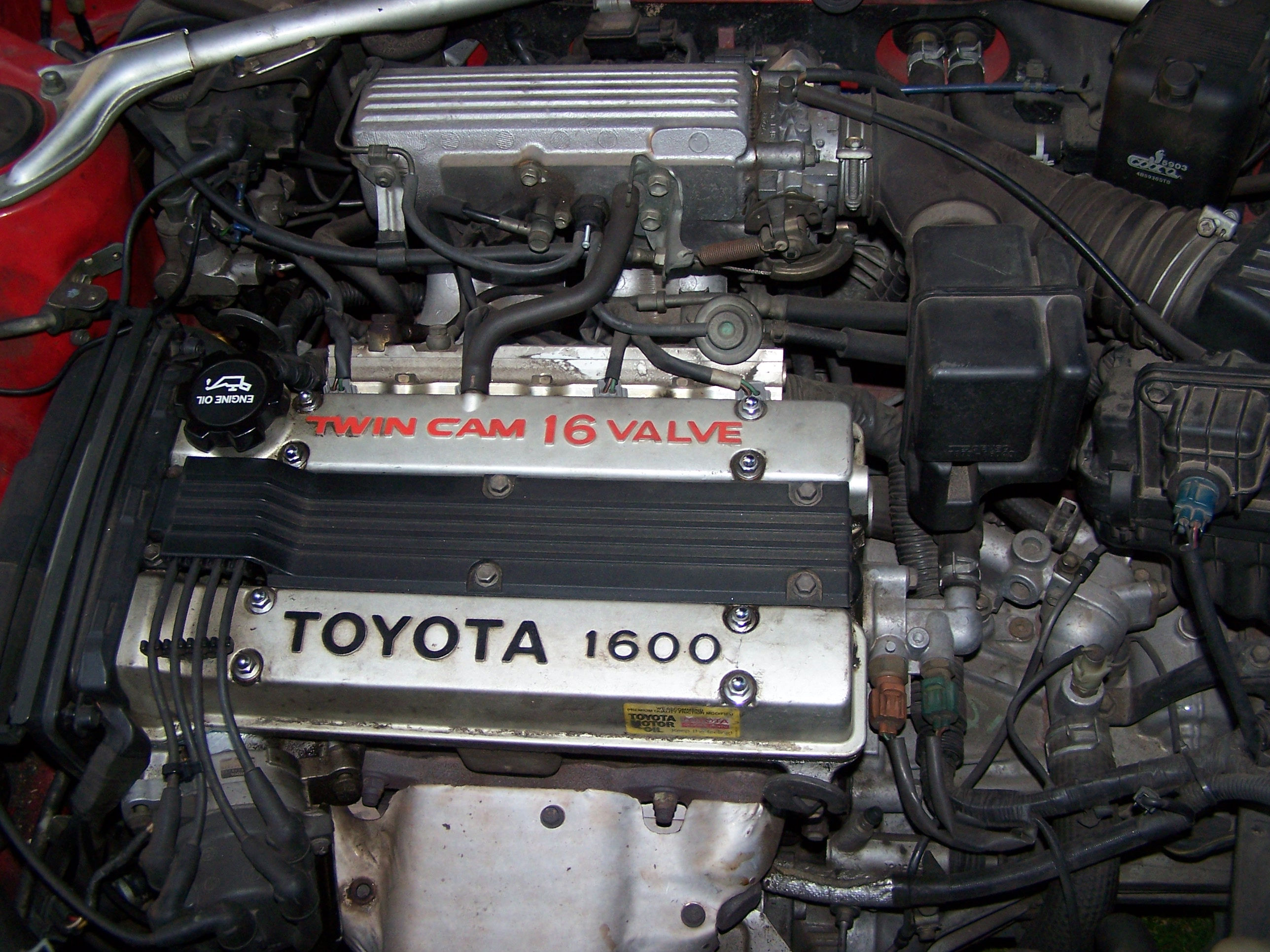
The 1989 updated "Smallport" or "Red Top" 4A-GE engine

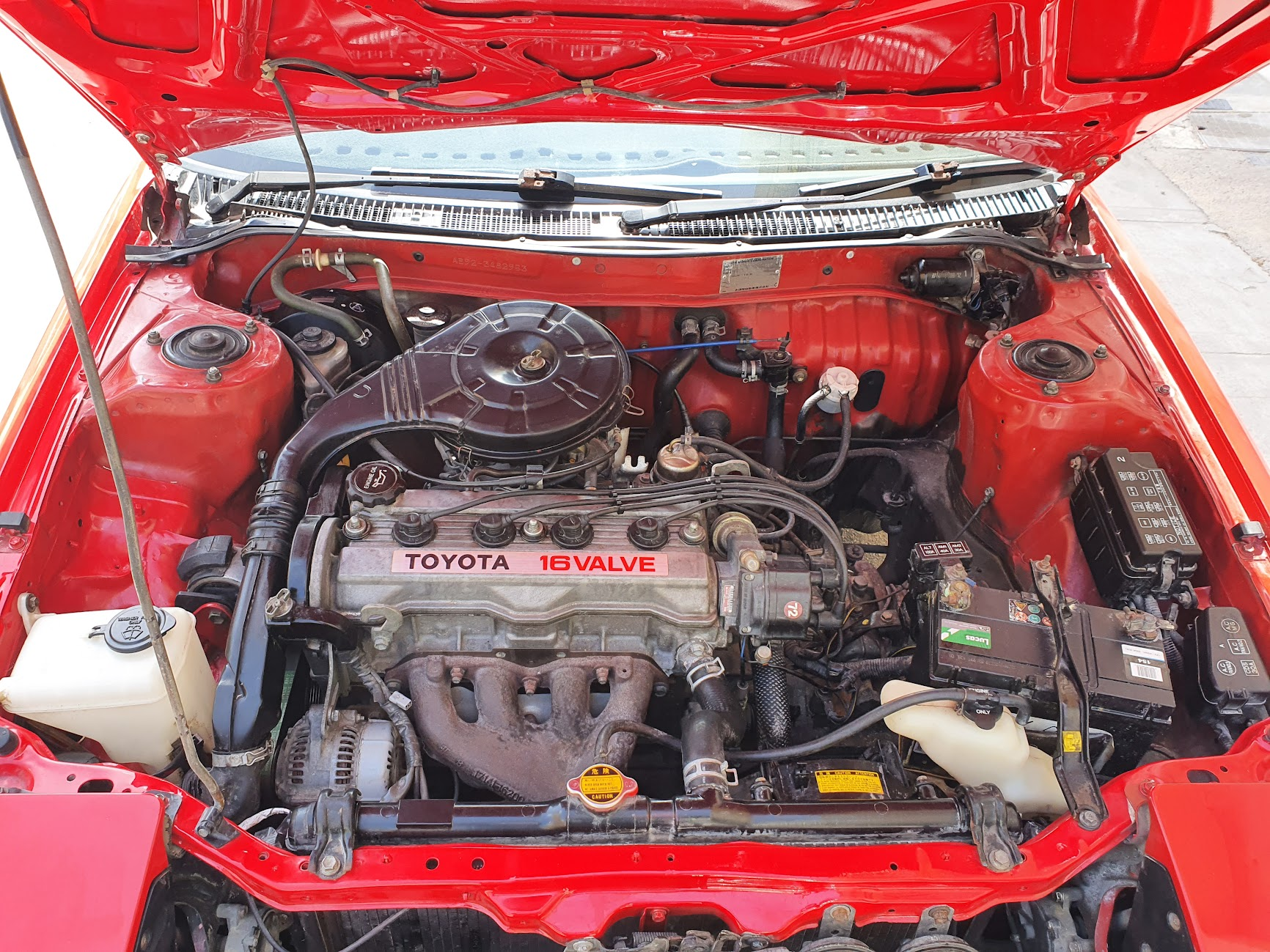
The carbureted 4A-F engine

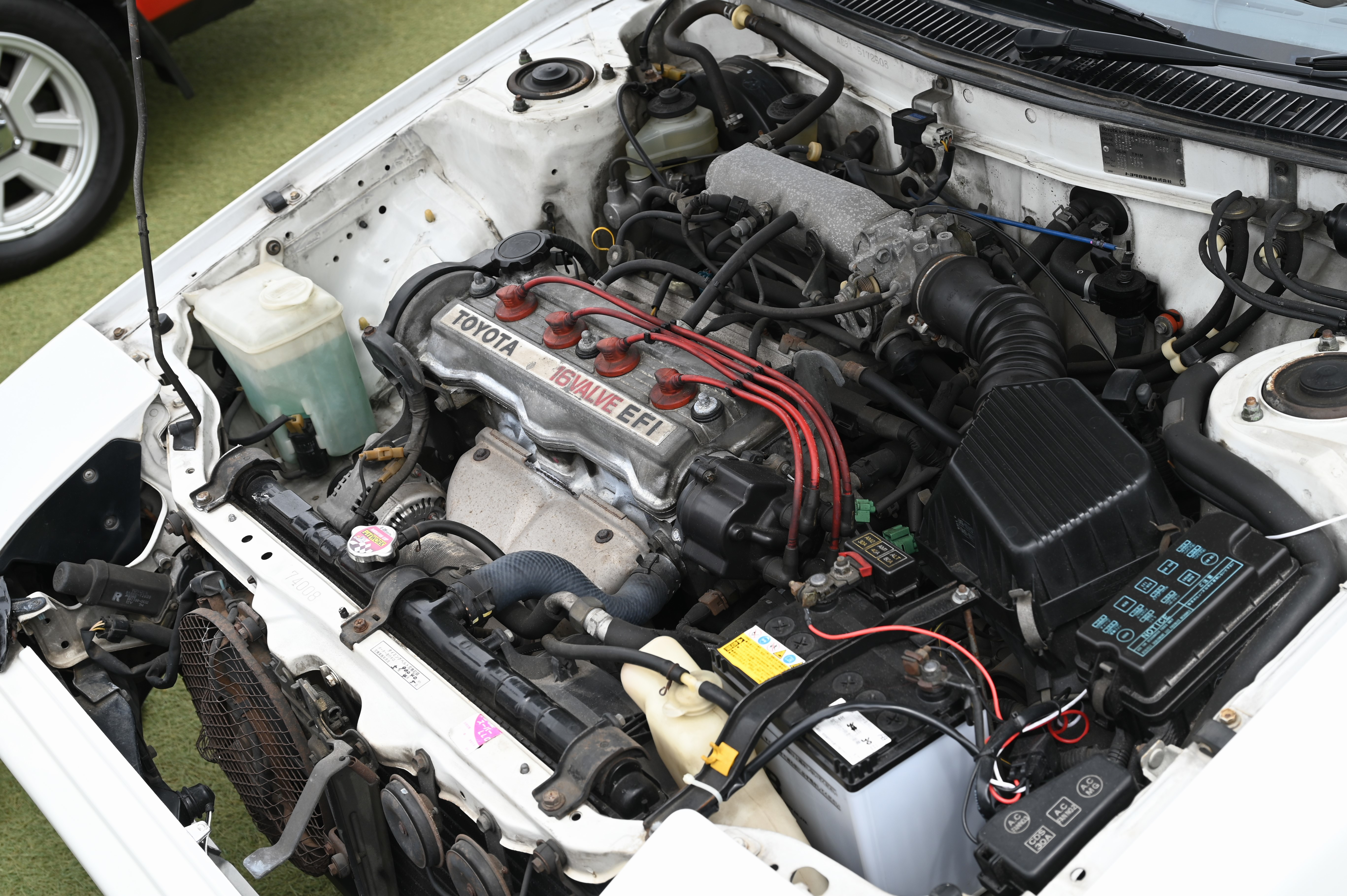
The fuel injected 5A-FE engine

== AE100 & AE101 Series (1991–1995) ==
Sixth generation
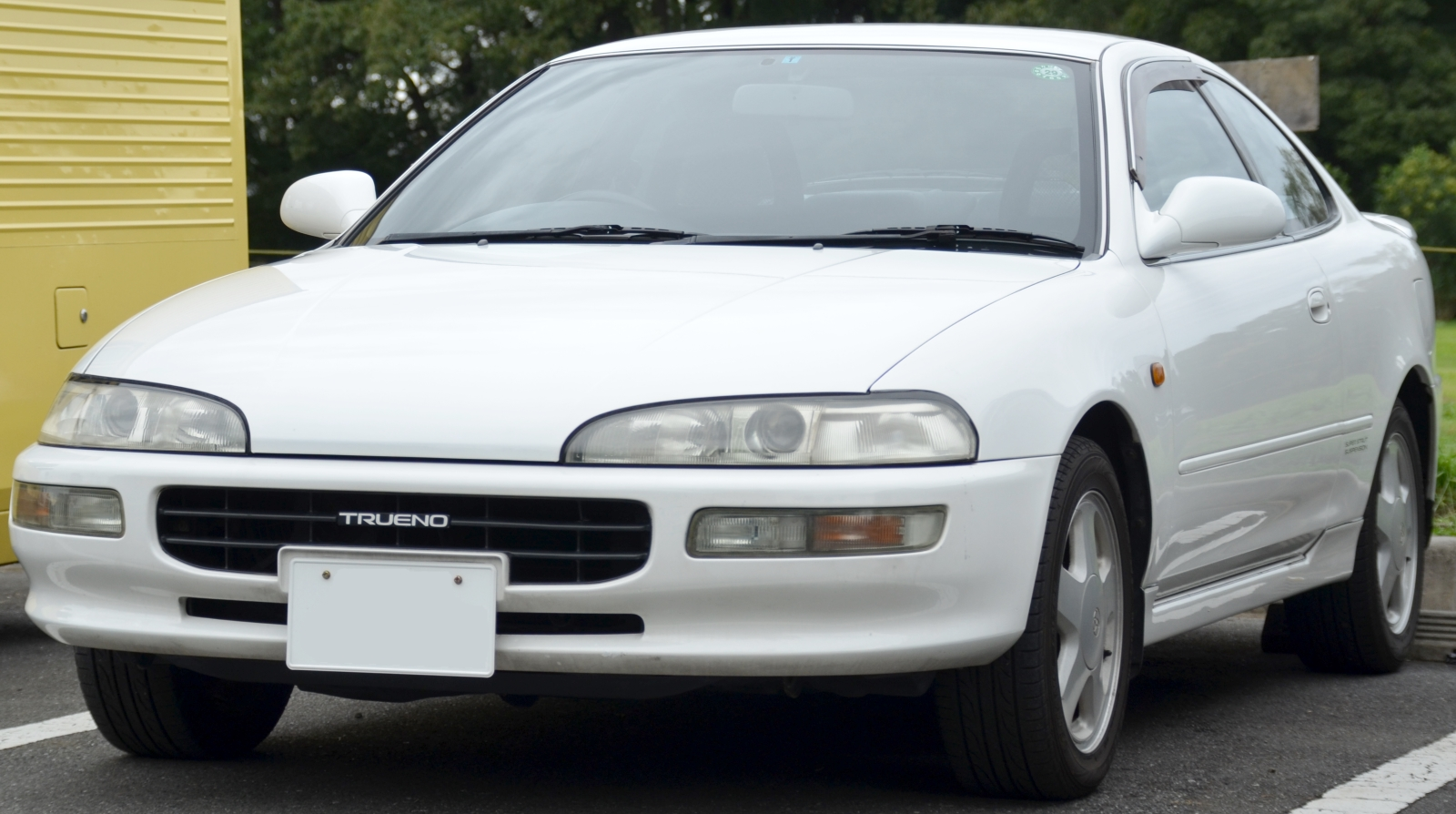
- Toyota Sprinter Trueno GT-APEX (AE101, facelift)

Overview
- Model code: AE100 (1.5 L); AE101 (1.6 L)
- Production: 1991–1995
- Assembly: Japan: Susono, Shizuoka (Kanto Auto Works); Japan: Yokosuka, Kanagawa

Body and chassis
- Body style: 2-door coupé
- Layout: Front engine, front-wheel drive
- Related: Toyota Corolla (E100); Toyota Sprinter (E100); Toyota Sprinter Marino/Corolla Ceres; Geo Prizm (E100); Holden Nova (LG)

Powertrain
- Engine: 1.5 L 5A-FE I4; 1.6 L 4A-FE I4; 1.6 L 4A-GE I4; 1.6 L 4A-GZE I4 supercharger
- Transmission: 5-speed C50/C56/E58 manual; 4-speed A240L/A245E automatic

Dimensions
- Wheelbase: 2,465 mm (97.0 in)
- Length: Pre-facelift: 4,275 mm (168.3 in) (Levin); 4,285 mm (168.7 in) (Trueno); Facelift: 4,300 mm (169.3 in) (Levin); 4,310 mm (169.7 in) (Trueno)
- Width: 1,695 mm (66.7 in)
- Height: 1,305 mm (51.4 in)
- Curb weight: 980–1,150 kg (2,160.5–2,535.3 lb)

The Sprinter Trueno and Corolla Levin underwent a full overhaul in June 1991 with the sixth generation models, based on the E100 series. Developed during the peak of the Japanese asset price bubble in the early 1990s, the latest technologies in body, chassis, engine, transmission and safety were put into the new E100 series. Consequently, the body size increased close to the maximum width the Japanese government regulations would allow for compact cars (1,700 mm [66.9 in] max) and became 70–80 kg (154–176 lb) heavier, making it less attractive as a sports compact model than with previous generations.

As with previous generations, this series continues to offer two separate styles and names, sold via different dealership chains in Japan. Unlike previous generations, however, the new E100 coupés were not officially exported elsewhere, making these models exclusive to Japan.

The chassis was completely new in this generation, with a much higher and rigid body than the previous generation E90 series. Sharing the same wheelbase as with the Corolla/Sprinter sedans, the suspension featured re-tuned front and rear MacPherson struts.

The biggest improvement in this generation was the high-performance 4A-GE engine found in the GT and GT-APEX models. Many of the parts were redesigned, with the intake side camshaft now having Toyota's Variable Valve Timing or VVT (a precursor to the later VVT-i with a discontinuous variable valve timing mechanism), and used a five-valve-per-cylinder head design (three inlet, two exhaust) for a total of 20 valves. This was seen as revolutionary at that time as Yamaha, who typically collaborated with Toyota to produce their high-performance engines, were actively using five-valve-per-cylinder designs in their 1985–2007 Genesis engined sport bikes. Prior to this model engine's introduction, Mitsubishi was the first automobile manufacturer to offer a five-valve-per-cylinder engine in 1989 with the 3G81 engine. The valve covers have also been redesigned in tandem with a new cylinder head, featuring silver cam covers with chrome lettering, hence the name "Silver Top". In addition, it was equipped with individual throttle bodies to increase engine throttle response, which was rare for a commercial vehicle of its class. Unlike the 16-valve "smallport" version of the 4A-GE engine offered in the earlier AE92 series, a MAF sensor was used instead of a MAP sensor. Because of this, it requires the use of an intake plenum. Maximum power was 160 PS (118 kW; 158 hp). The supercharged 4A-GZE engine offered in the GT-Z retained the same 16-valve head as with the previous versions, but it did receive changes to the engine internals as well as a minor cosmetic change to the top-mounted intercooler that featured Toyota's then-new logo. It produced 170 PS (125 kW; 168 hp).

The body panels were all new, with many of them being redesigned to make way for a more modern, rounder, aerodynamic and luxury styling than its previous incarnations. The Levin received a new front bumper design while the Trueno had a front bumper design that was largely similar to that of the previous facelifted AE92. The GT-Z versions again featured functional bonnet scoops to direct fresh air to the intercooler but, unlike the AE92s, the scoops were integrated into the bonnets' outer skins rather than being add-on pieces attached to non-GT-Z bonnets. The most significant design change in this generation, however, was the removal of the retractable pop-up headlights used in the Trueno since the AE86 models. Due to changing industry trends at the time, the use of hidden headlamps for the Trueno started to wane in popularity in the early 90's after last using them in the E90 series, and so to compensate for this change, the retractable headlamps were replaced with fixed headlights similar to the Levin but in the style of the combo lights from the previous generation AE91/92 models. This was done to maintain its distinction between the Levin and the Trueno with the latter's front fascia design while still providing a more modern look (as mentioned above). The series was given a minor facelift in May 1993, which included revised bumpers and taillights. This includes a slightly larger grille on the front bumper of the Trueno.

Trim grades were also revised at the start of this generation, simplifying the lineup from six different trim grades to five. The low-priced S trim grade, as part of the AE100 series, replaced the previous G trim grade of the AE91 series and received the economical 1.5 L 5A-FE engine, which produced 105 PS (77 kW; 104 hp). This trim received a limited-edition version called the S Limited in December 1994. The successor to the preceding ZS and XS trim grades was the SJ, which featured the updated 4A-FE engine producing 115 PS (85 kW; 113 hp). A limited-edition model of the SJ was the SJ Limited, introduced in January 1992 and again in February 1994. January 1992 also saw a limited edition of the GT-APEX called the GT-APEX Limited, which was produced for that run only. The female-oriented Lime/Lissé trim grade of the AE91 series was dropped. An updated TEMS electronically controlled suspension (upper and lower G-sensitive type called Super Strut Suspension (SSsus)) was standard for GT-Z and optional for GT-APEX. The GT-Z was also equipped with a viscous limited-slip differential (LSD) as standard equipment.

The AE92 Corolla Levin was exported to Hong Kong with Japanese market specifications and was offered in two trim levels; the base SJ and the top-of-the-line GT-APEX.

Japanese Formula 1 driver Ukyo Katayama was appointed as the image representative for marketing as he was popular in Japan at the time. A commercial was broadcast in which Katayama runs a Levin on the Mine Circuit with the catchphrase "右京、レビンす" (Ukyo, Levin).

Sprinter Trueno

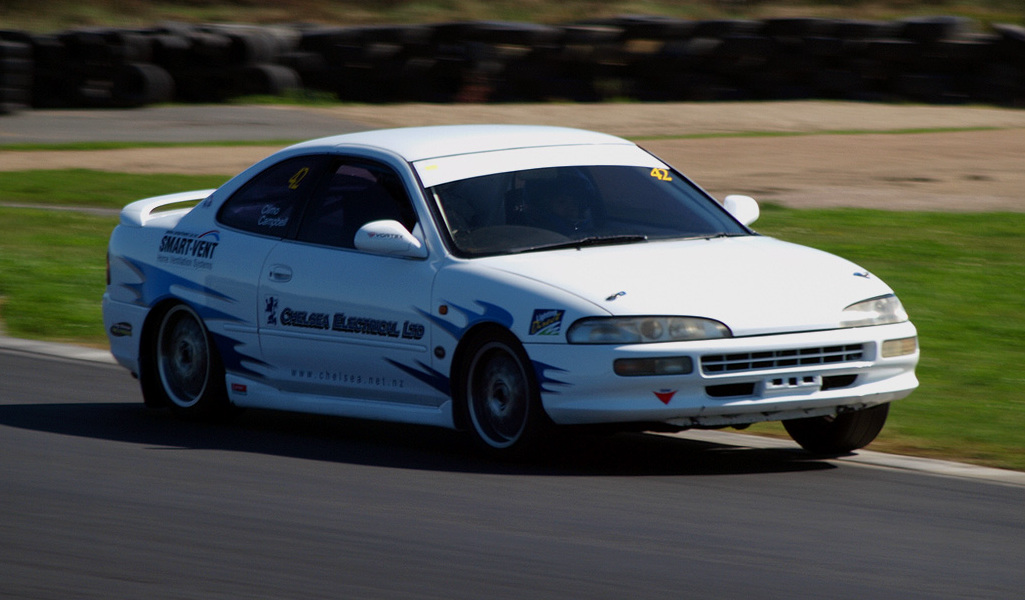
Sprinter Trueno GT-APEX (AE101, pre-facelift)

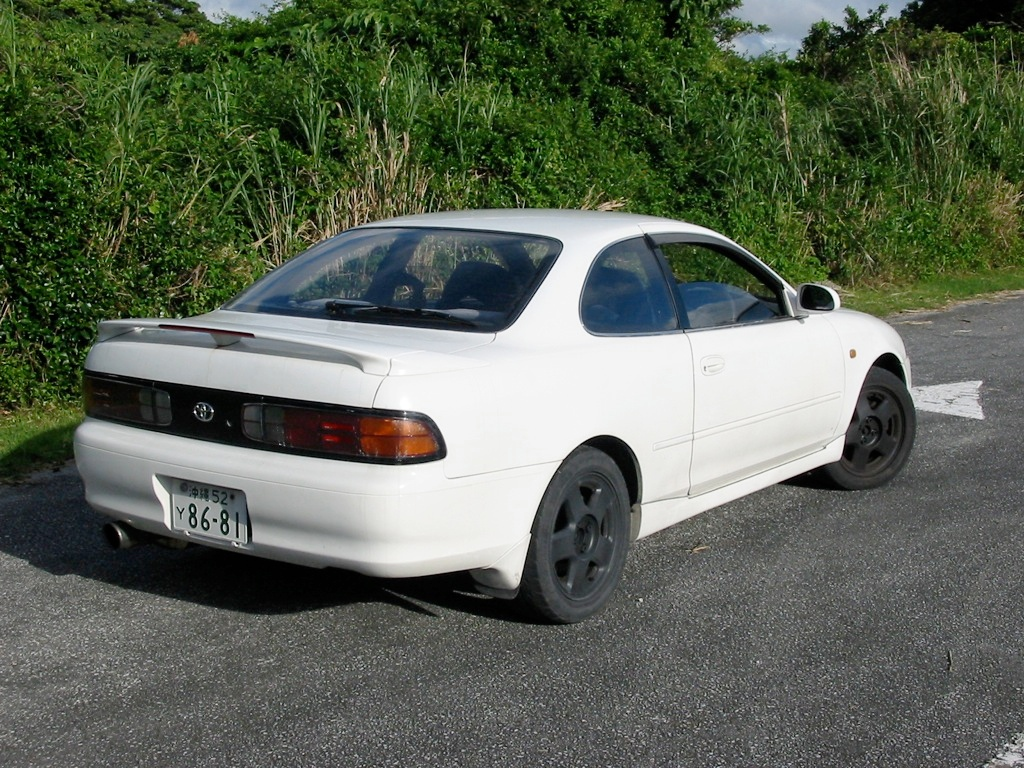
Sprinter Trueno GT-APEX (AE101, pre-facelift)

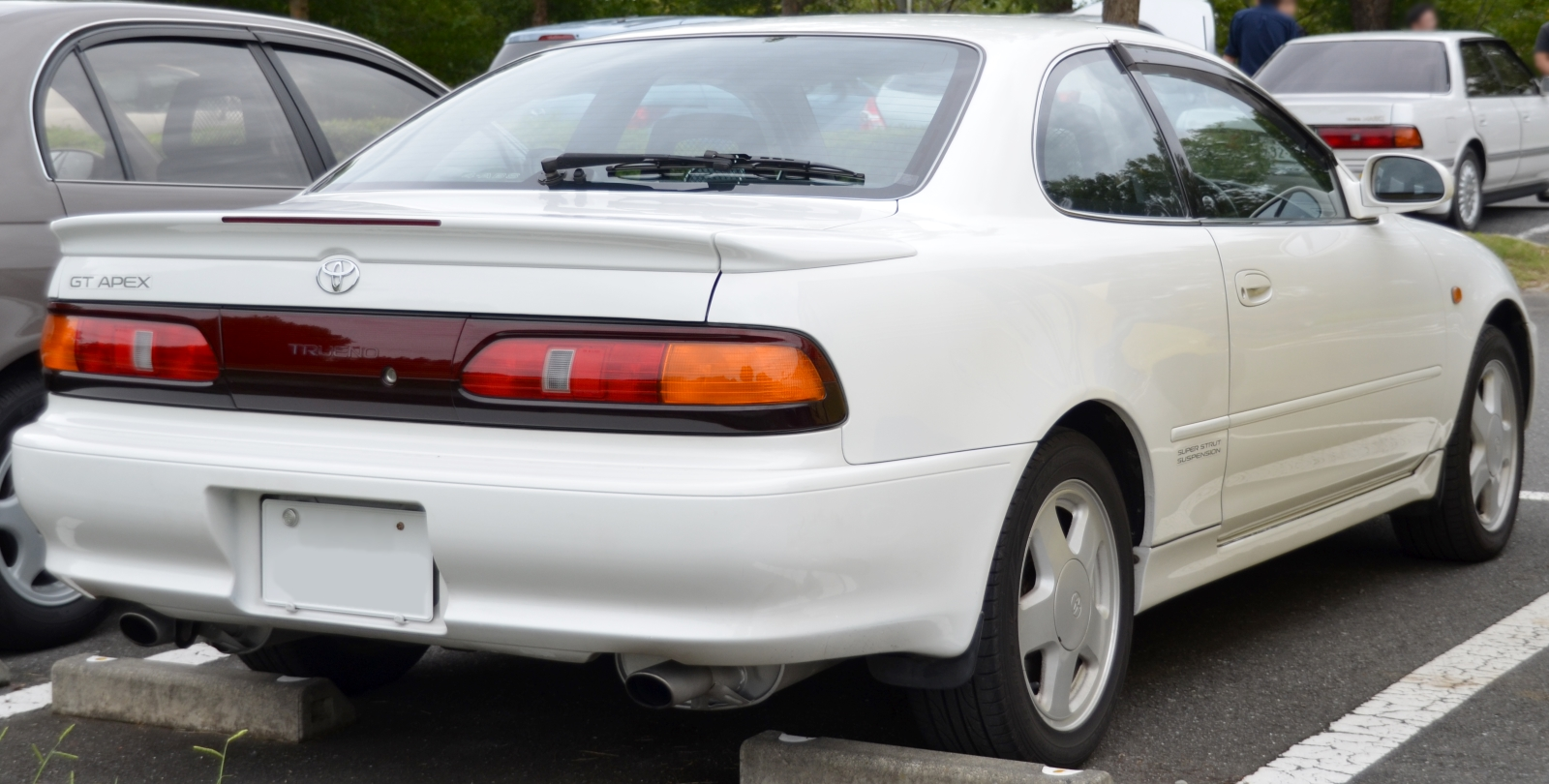
Sprinter Trueno GT-APEX (AE101, facelift)
Corolla Levin

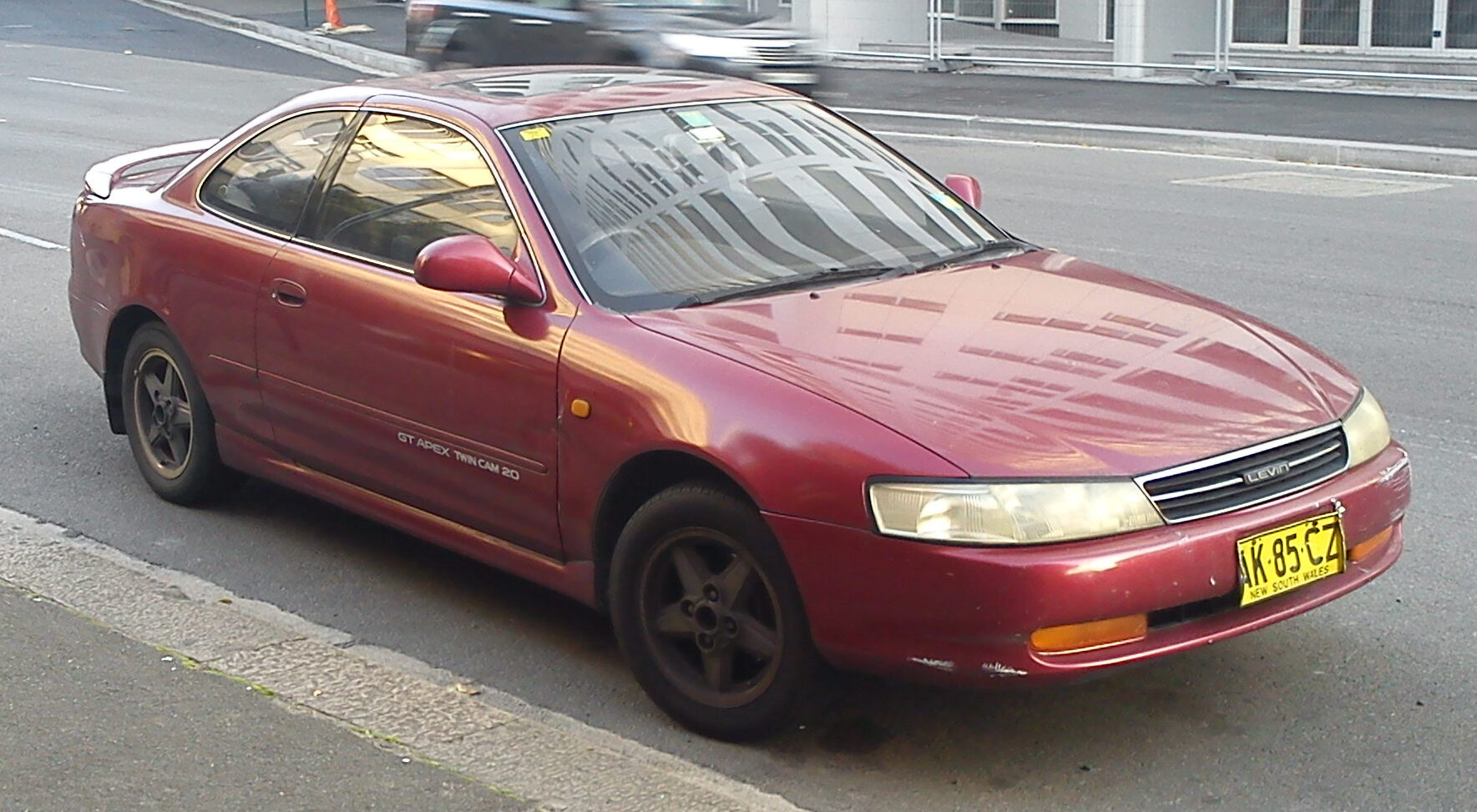
Corolla Levin GT-APEX (AE101, pre-facelift)

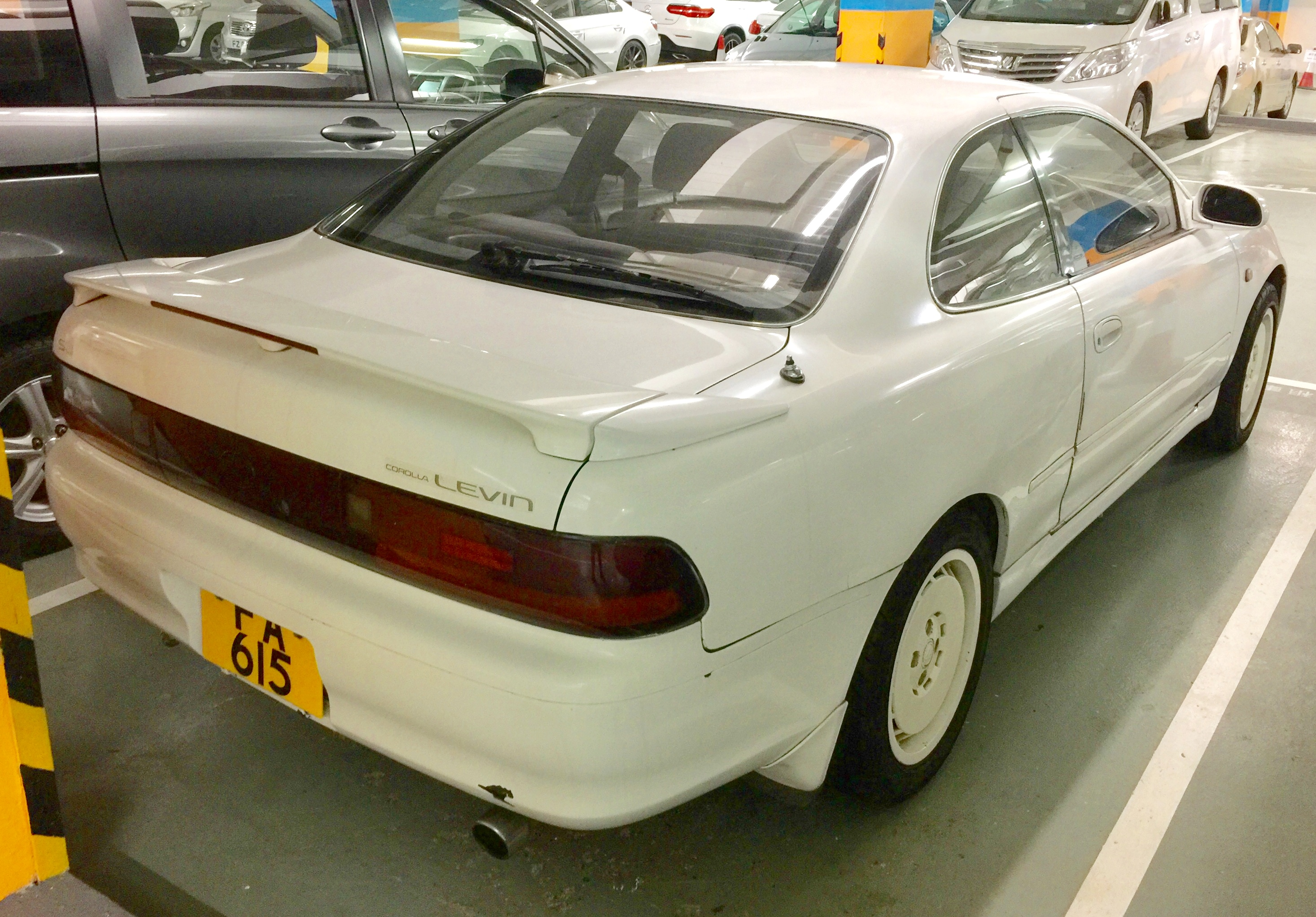
Corolla Levin SJ (AE101, pre-facelift)

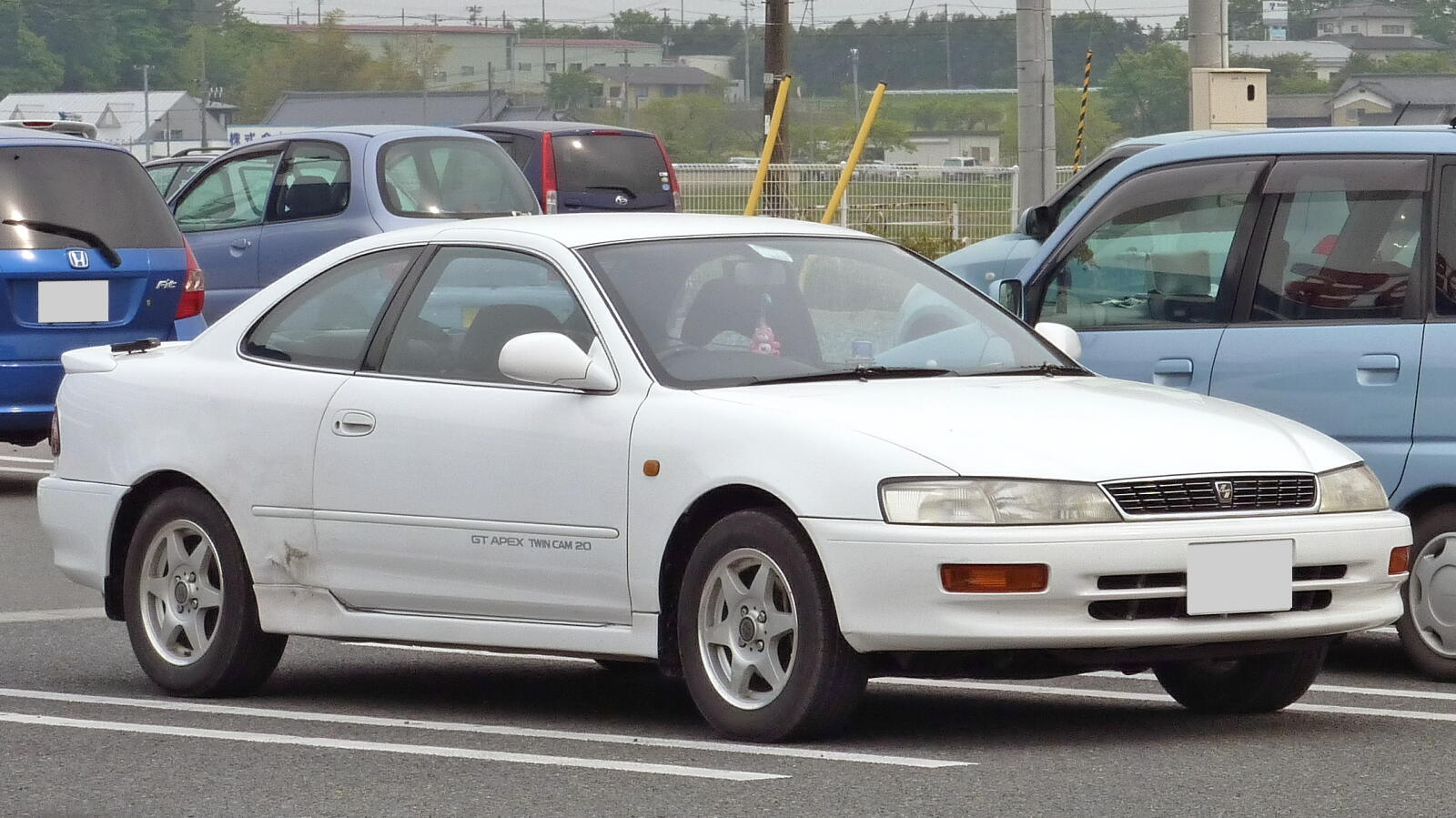
Corolla Levin GT-APEX (AE101, facelift)

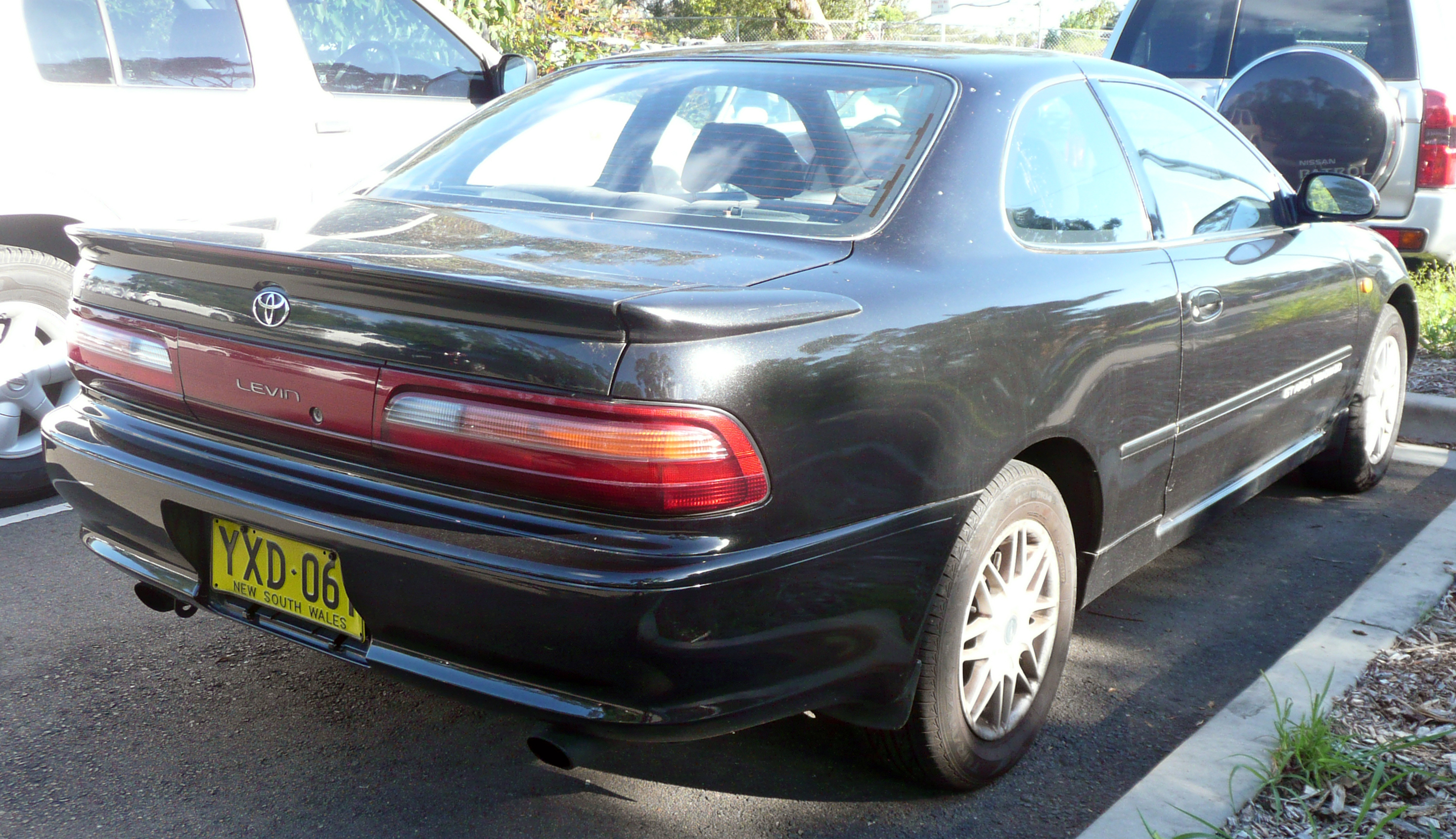
Corolla Levin GT-APEX (AE101, facelift)
Engines

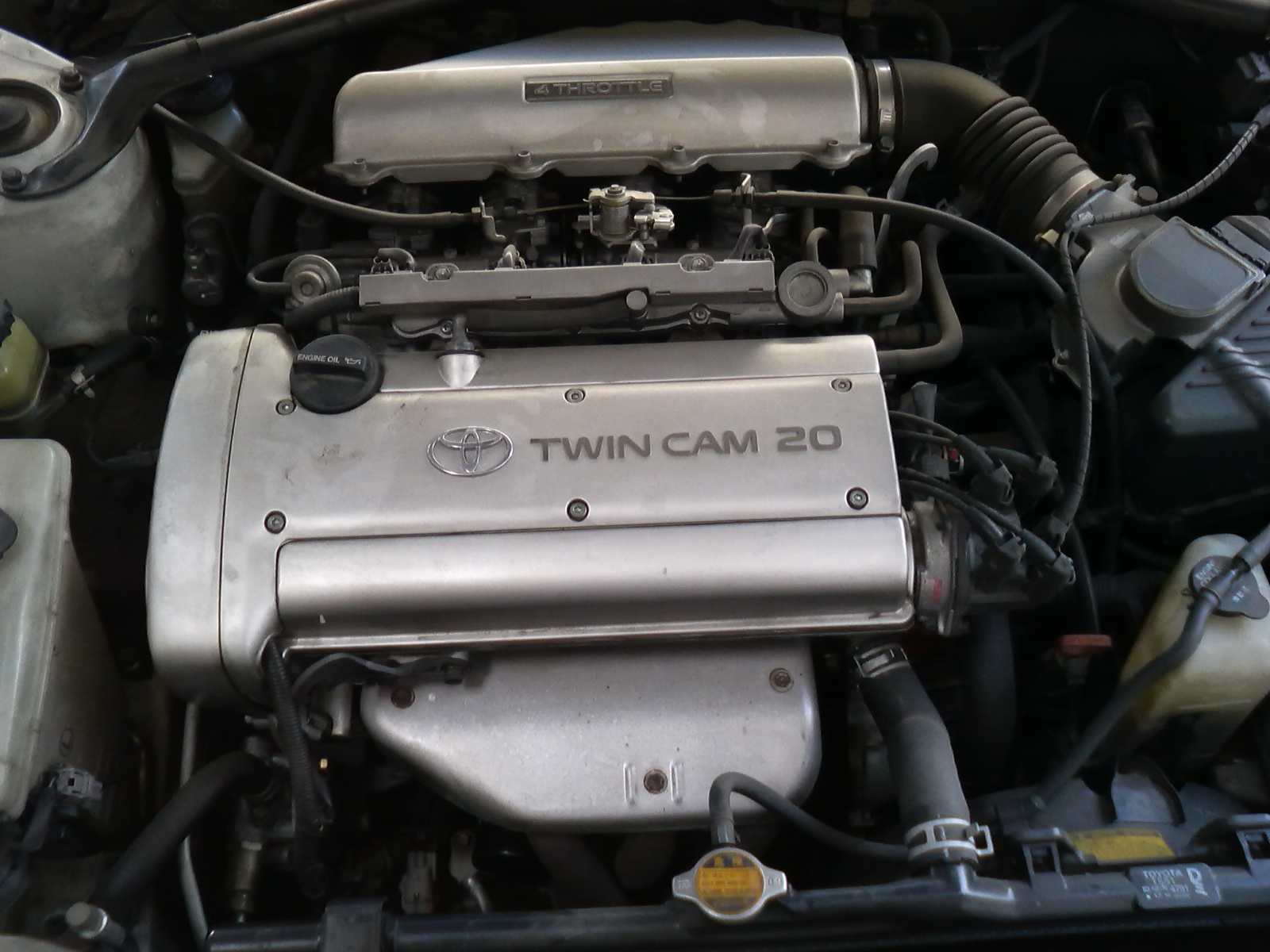
"Silver Top" 20-valve 4A-GE engine

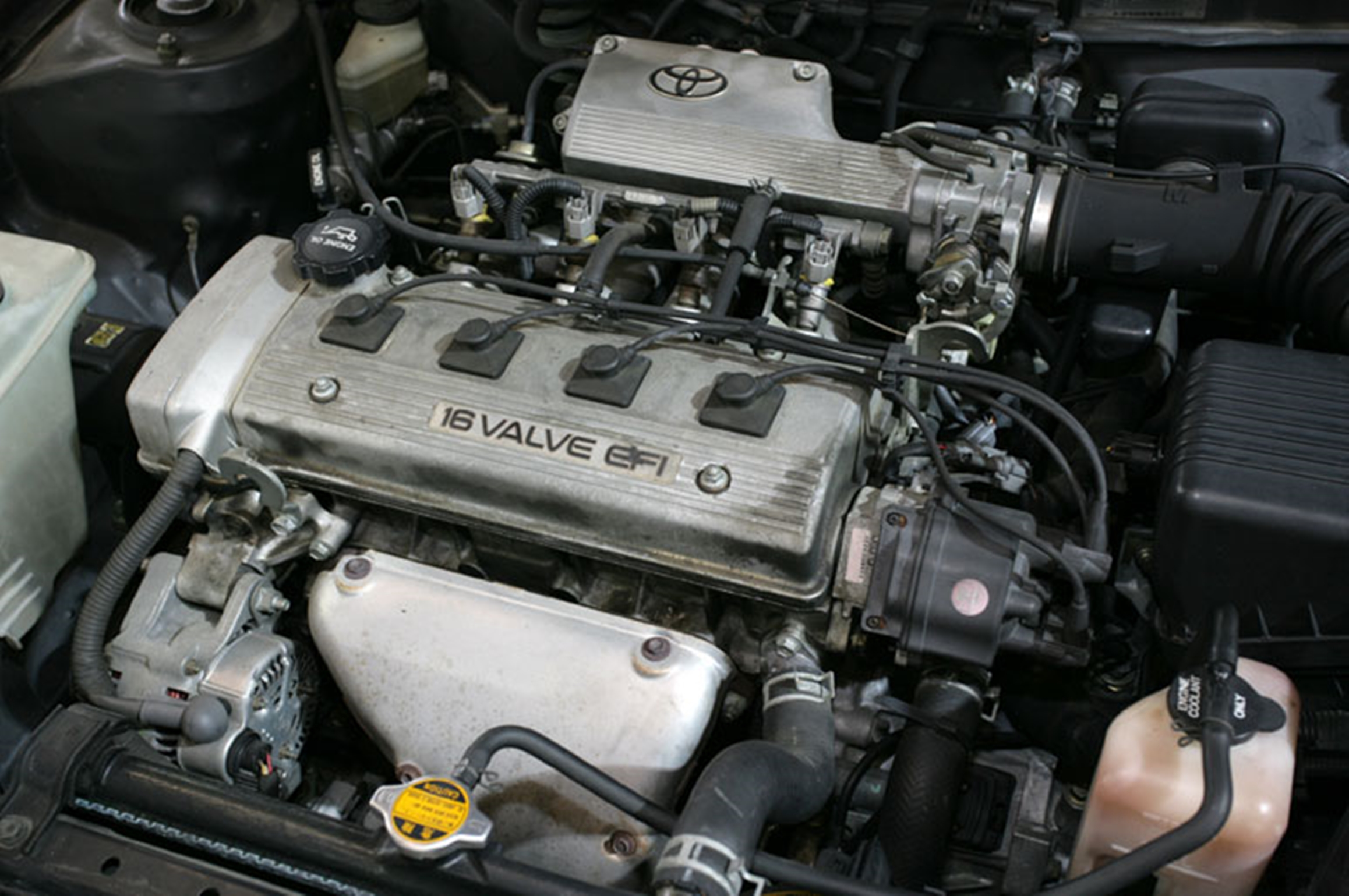
The updated 4A-FE engine

== AE110 & AE111 series (1995–2000) ==
Seventh generation
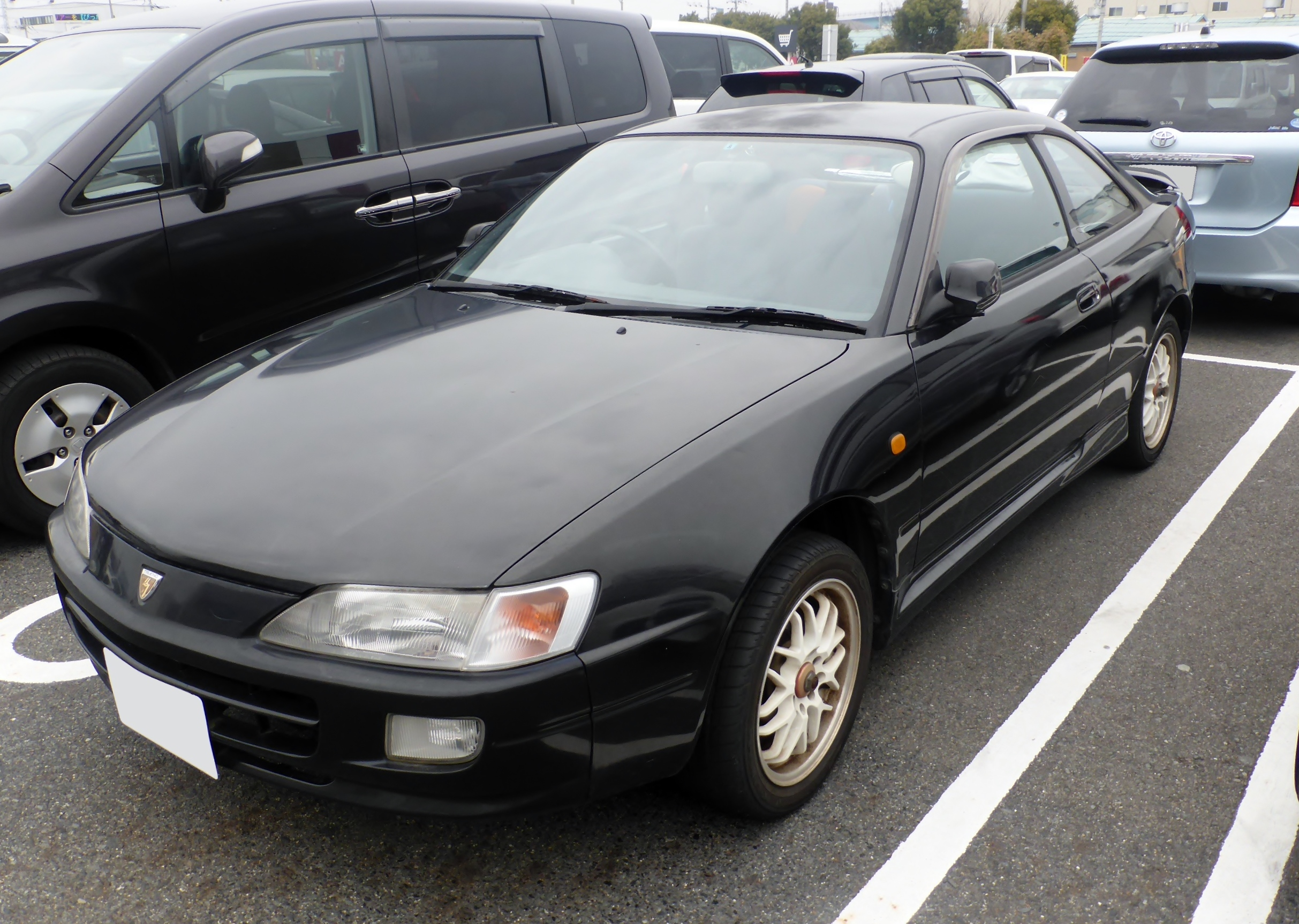
- Toyota Sprinter Trueno BZ-G (AE111, pre-facelift)

Overview
- Model code: AE110 (1.5 L); AE111 (1.6 L)
- Production: 1995–2000
- Assembly: Japan: Susono, Shizuoka (Kanto Auto Works); Japan: Yokosuka, Kanagawa

Body and chassis
- Body style: 2-door coupé
- Layout: Front engine, front-wheel drive
- Related: Toyota Corolla (E110); Toyota Sprinter (E110); Toyota Sprinter Carib (E110); Toyota Corolla Spacio (E110); Toyota Sprinter Marino/Corolla Ceres; Chevrolet Prizm (E110)

Powertrain
- Engine: 1.5 L 5A-FE I4; 1.6 L 4A-FE I4; 1.6 L 4A-GE I4
- Transmission: 5-speed C50/C52 manual; 6-speed C160 manual; 4-speed A240L/A245E/A246E automatic

Dimensions
- Wheelbase: 2,465 mm (97.0 in)
- Length: Pre-facelift: 4,285 mm (168.7 in) (Corolla Levin); 4,300 mm (169.3 in) (Sprinter Trueno); Facelift: 4,305 mm (169.5 in)
- Width: 1,695 mm (66.7 in)
- Height: 1,305 mm (51.4 in)
- Curb weight: 950–1,110 kg (2,094.4–2,447.1 lb)

The seventh and final generation of the Sprinter Trueno and Corolla Levin was introduced in May 1995. This is the last series to use the Sprinter Trueno name, and the last to be offered as a sport compact coupé.

Due to a recession known as the Lost Decades that was happening in Japan at the time, many cost-cutting measures were put in place for the E110 series, which included sharing many of the same parts and platform from its predecessor. The weight of the twin coupés was reduced significantly with the revised structural design, the use of Toyota Super Olefin Polymer (TSOP) thermoplastic resin materials for the bumpers and interior and several other modifications. Like previous generations, the series continued to use different styles for the Levin and Trueno, however the front fascia would be changed to a more subtle design in 1997 that is nearly identical to each other with some slight differences.

The initial models (known as Zenki) were manufactured from 1995 to 1997, with the facelifted models (known as Kouki) manufactured from 1997 to 2000 afterwards. New trim levels were introduced, replacing the S, SJ, GT and GT-APEX trims of the previous generation. These are FZ, FZ Limited, XZ, BZ-V, BZ-G, BZ-R and BZ-R V. Initially, the lineup consisted of the FZ, FZ Limited, XZ, BZ-V and BZ-G trims. The low-priced FZ (as well as the limited edition FZ Limited offered in December 1995 and 1996), as part of the AE110 series, featured the detuned 1.5 L 5A-FE engine with revised intake, now producing 100 PS (74 kW; 99 hp). For the AE111 series, the XZ featured the 1.6 L 4A-FE engine, and the BZ-V, BZ-G and BZ-R all featured the 20-valve 4A-GE engine. The 4A-GE in this generation was updated with revised internals, the replacement of a MAF sensor with a MAP sensor, and a new valve cover, this time in black, hence the name "Black Top". This new 4A-GE engine produced 165 PS (121 kW; 163 hp). The supercharged GT-Z trim with the 4A-GZE engine is dropped.

In May 1996, the driver's side airbag and ABS became standard safety equipment for all trim levels. In April 1997, in time for the facelifted models, the lineup would be refreshed for one final time by adding the BZ-R trim while replacing the BZ-V trim with the BZ-R V trim. The BZ-R trim featured a 6-speed manual transmission, LSD, bigger front rotors, improved calipers, a taller rear spoiler and Super Strut Suspension (SSsus), all of which could be added to the BZ-G and BZ-R V models as factory options. Additionally, a set of Recaro SR3 (confetti pattern) seats could be installed as a factory option. The safety equipment was once again updated with the implementation of Toyota's Global Outstanding Assessment (GOA) passive safety vehicle body technology, dual airbags and seat belts with pretensioners and force limiters as standard.

The effects of the Lost Decades recession as well as the declining demand of sports coupés in recent years have spelled the end of the Sprinter Trueno and Corolla Levin (as well as several other sports coupés around the same timeframe). Toyota decided to cut their lineup of front-wheel drive coupés by introducing the T230 series Celica (which shared the same platform as the E120 series Corolla introduced in 2000) in 1999, which was primarily developed to replace both the T200 series Celica and the Japan-only Curren, but also served as a replacement for both the Sprinter Trueno and Corolla Levin. The Sprinter Trueno and Corolla Levin were both discontinued in August 2000 with the launch of the E120 series Corolla that same year while the entire Sprinter lineup was retired around that same timeframe (with the wagons continuing production up until 2002), with the Sprinter sedans being replaced by a hatchback called the Allex.

Sprinter Trueno

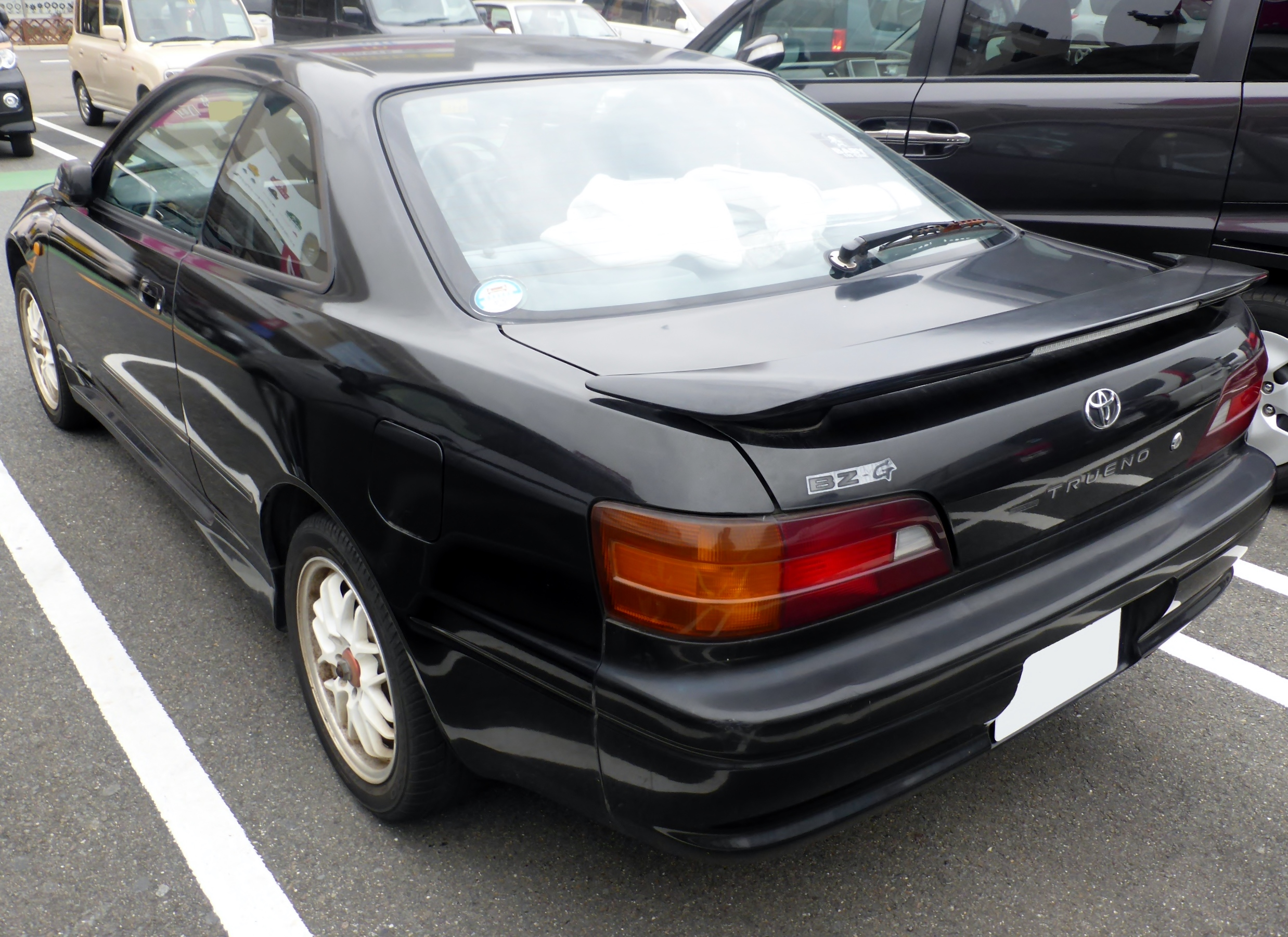
Sprinter Trueno BZ-G (AE111, pre-facelift)

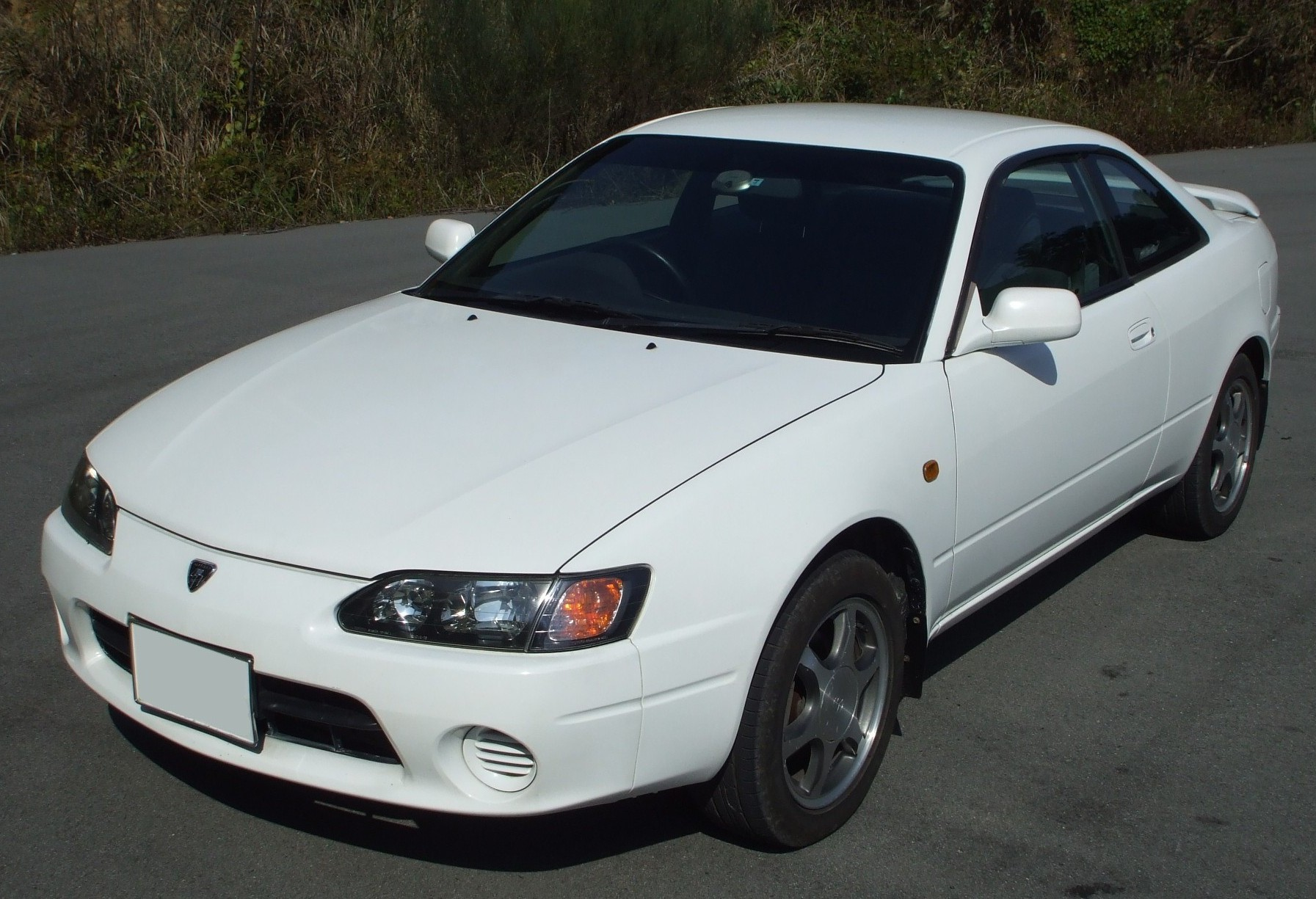
Sprinter Trueno XZ (AE111, facelift)

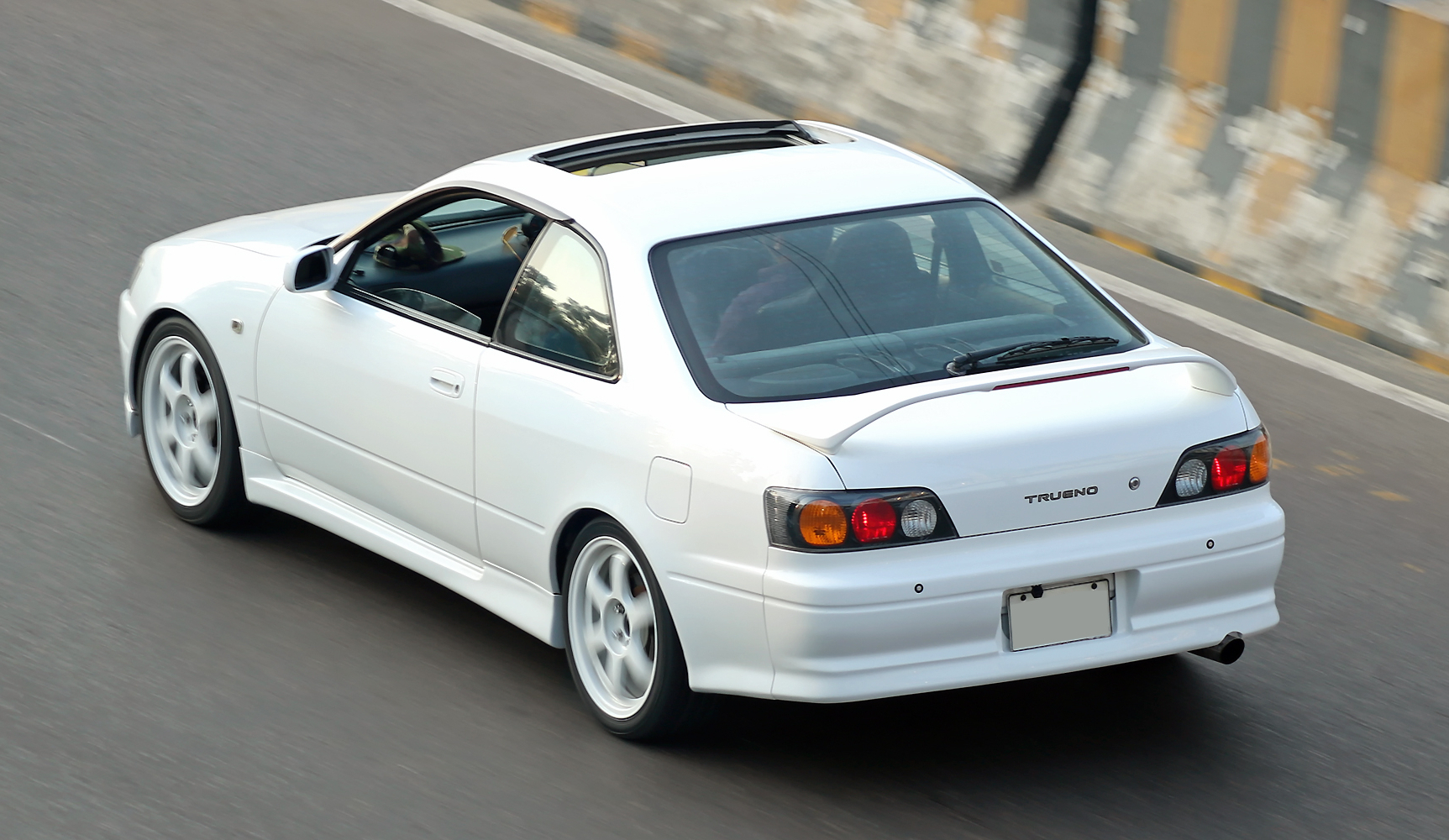
Sprinter Trueno BZ-G (AE111, facelift)
Corolla Levin

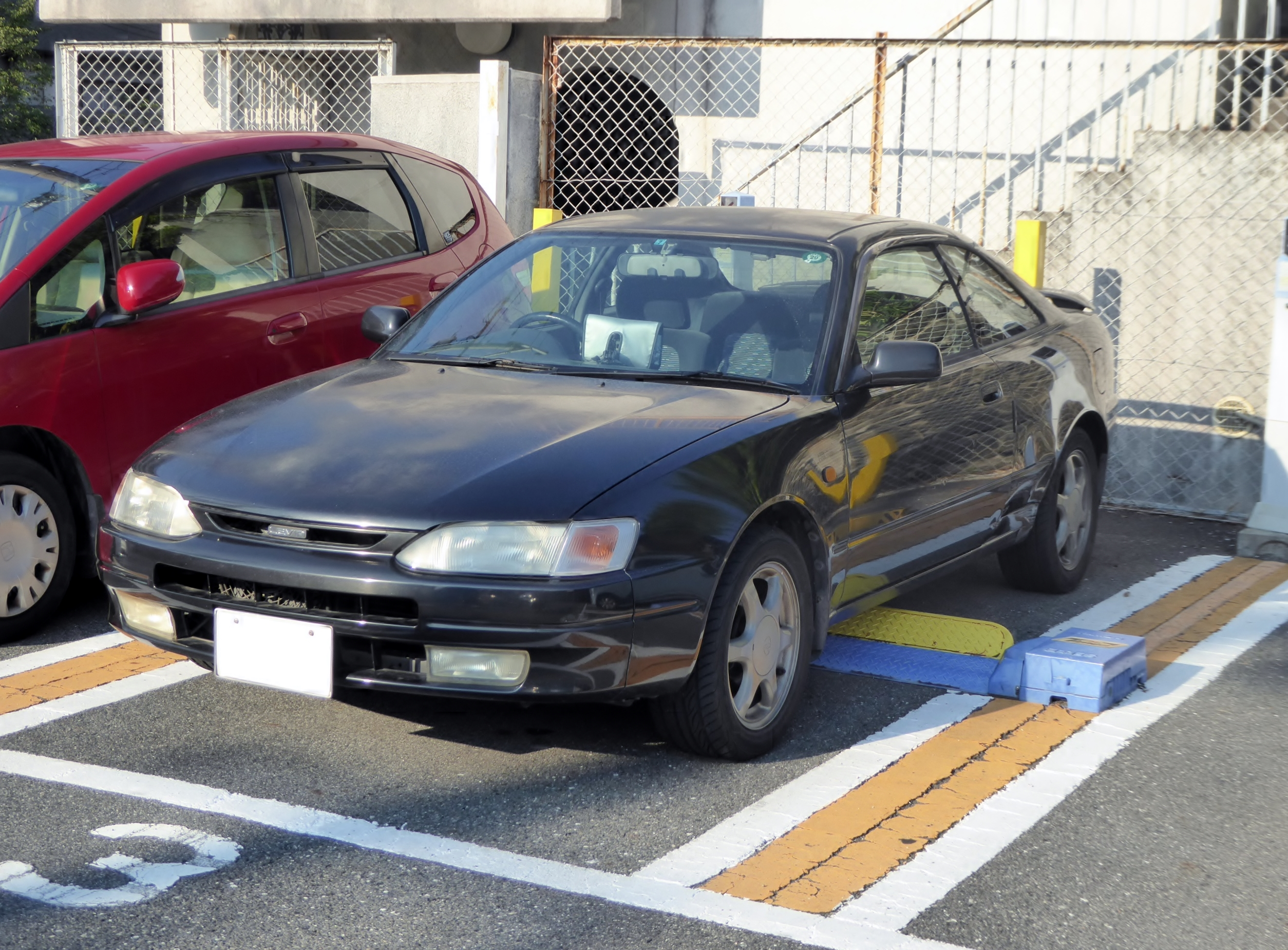
Corolla Levin FZ (AE110, pre-facelift)

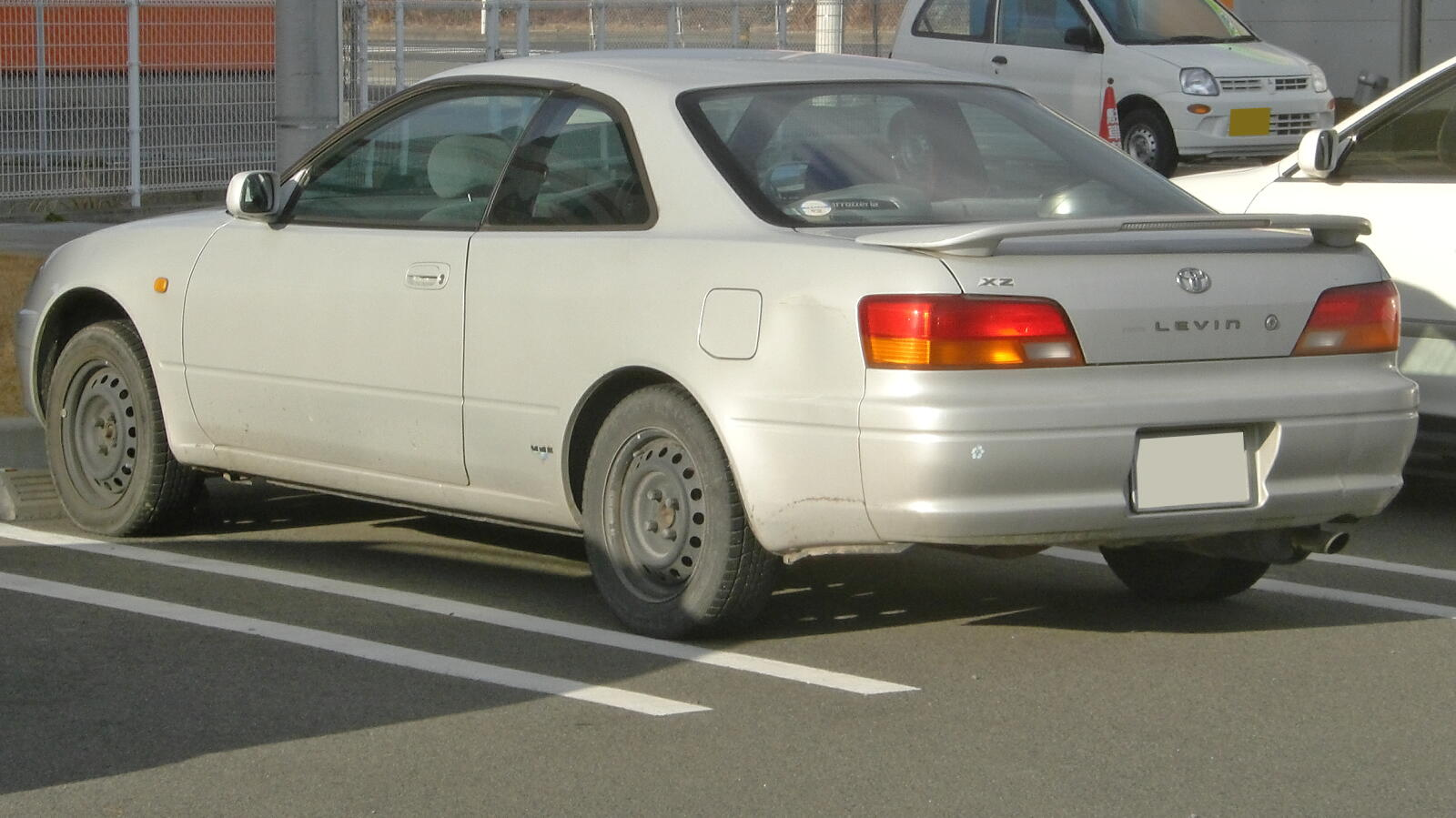
Corolla Levin XZ (AE111, pre-facelift)

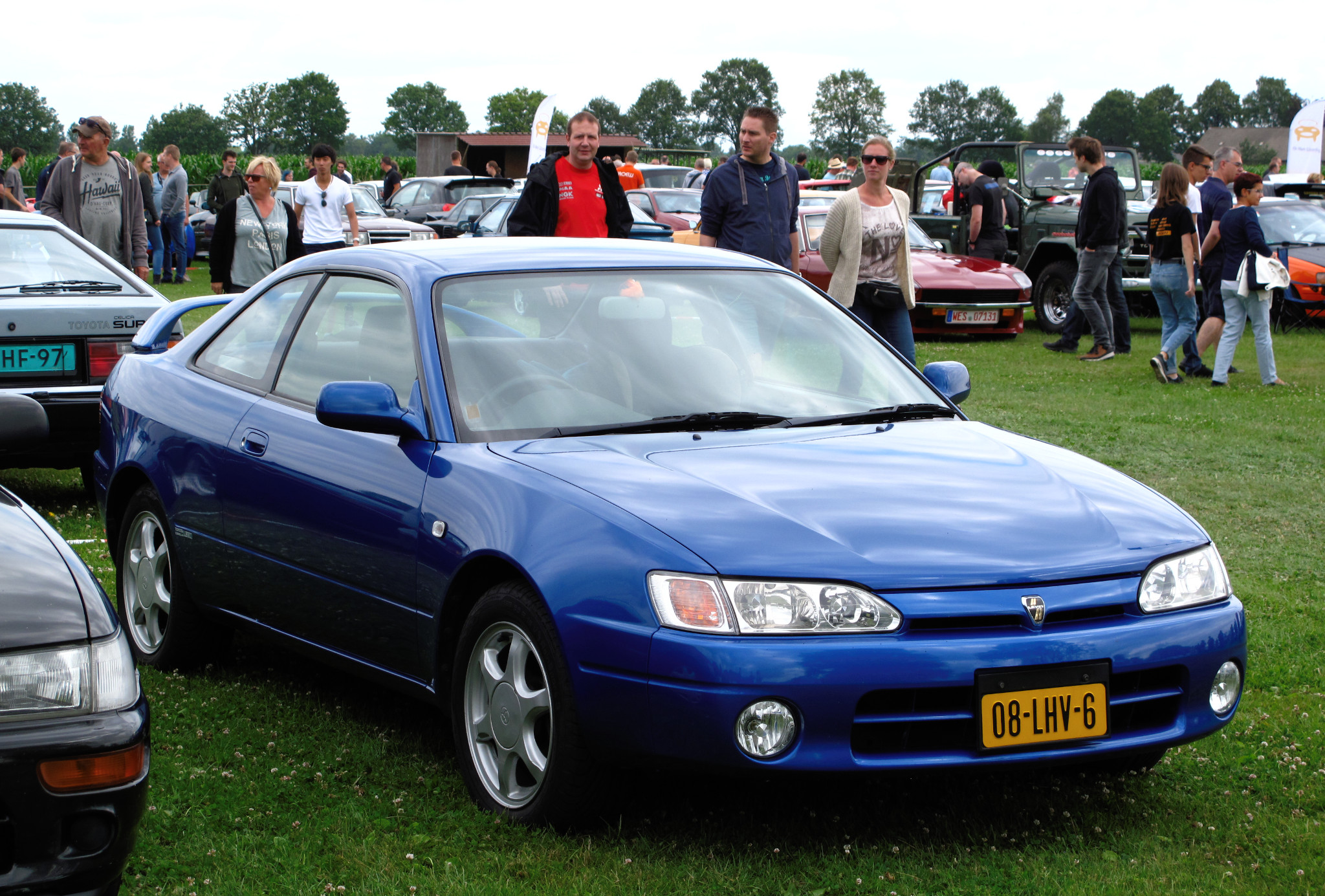
Corolla Levin BZ-G (AE111, facelift)

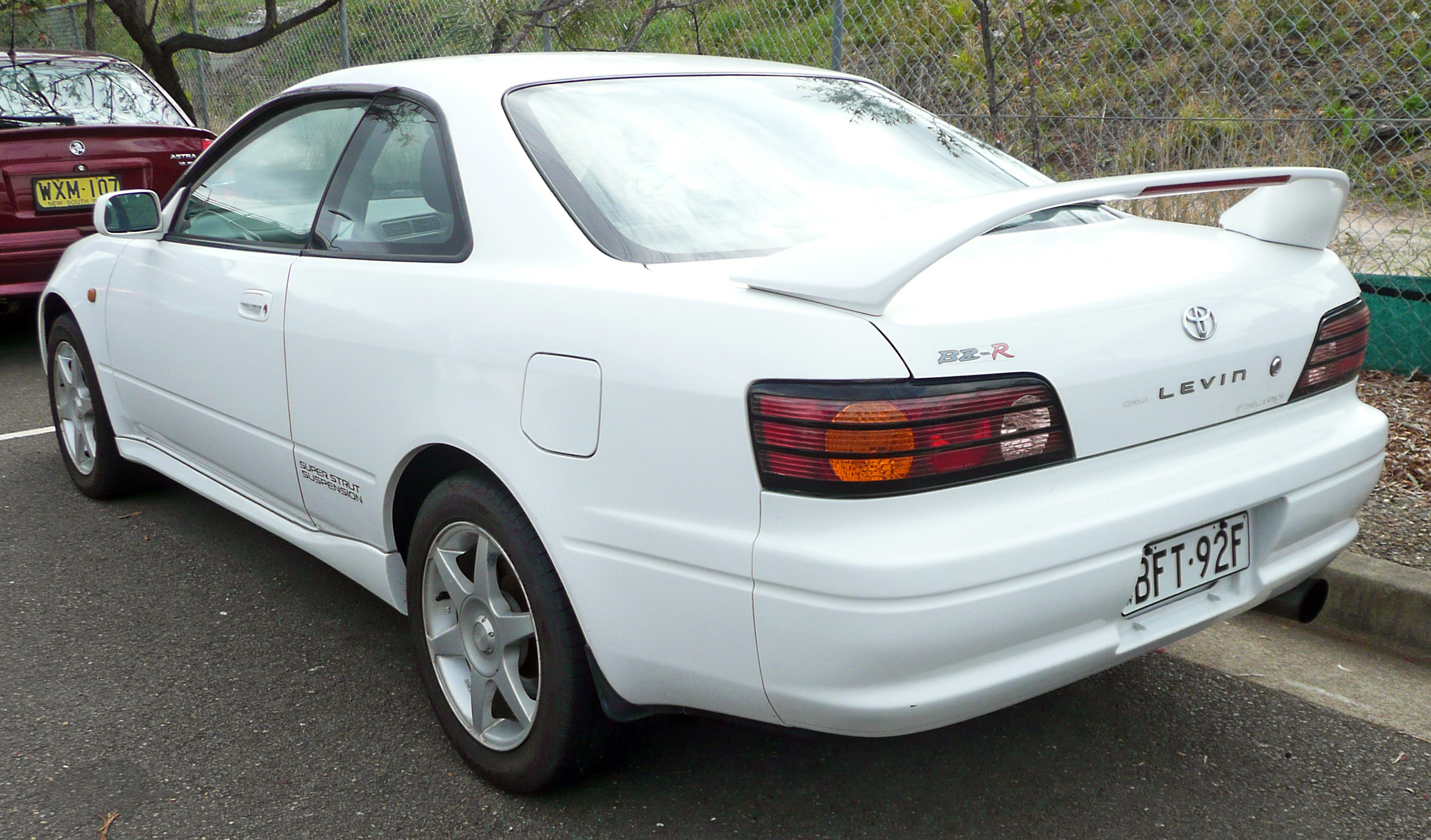
Corolla Levin BZ-R (AE111, facelift)
Engines

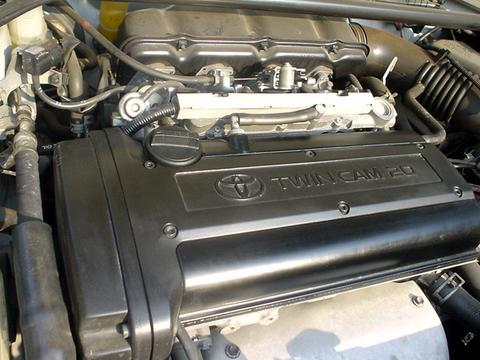
"Black Top" 20-valve 4A-GE engine

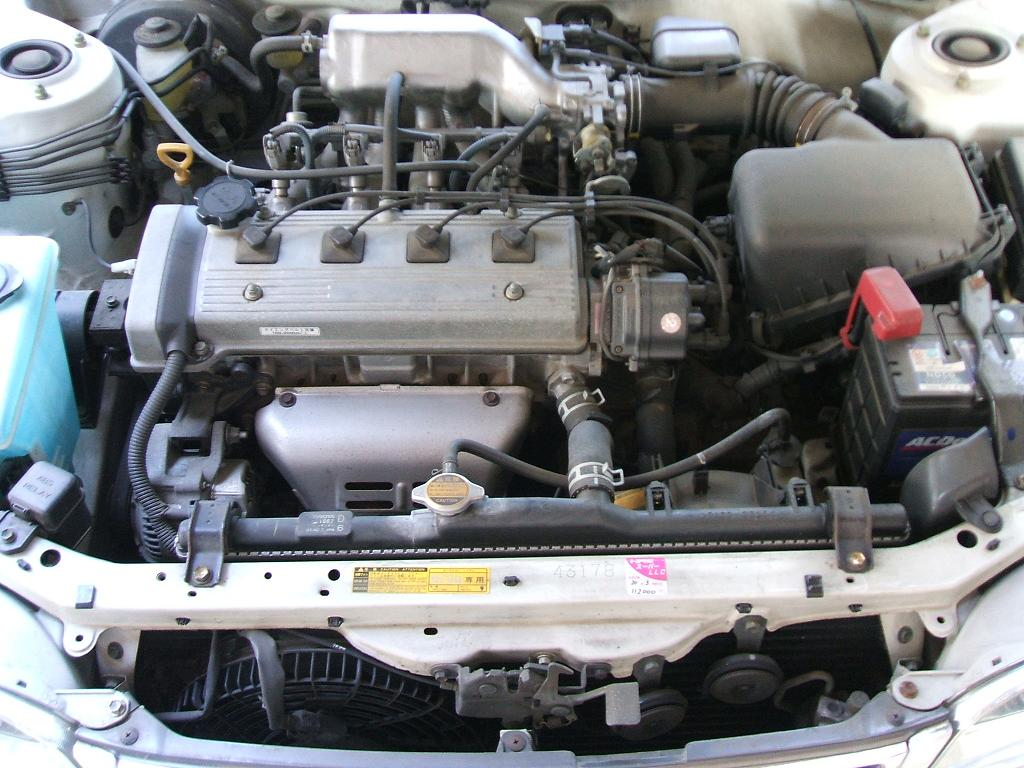
5A-FE engine with updated intake manifold

== Other uses of "Trueno" and "Levin" names ==
From 1999 to 2018, the name "Levin" was later reused for the E110, E120, E150 and E180 Corolla hatchbacks in Australia and New Zealand, where the sporty models had the Levin label.

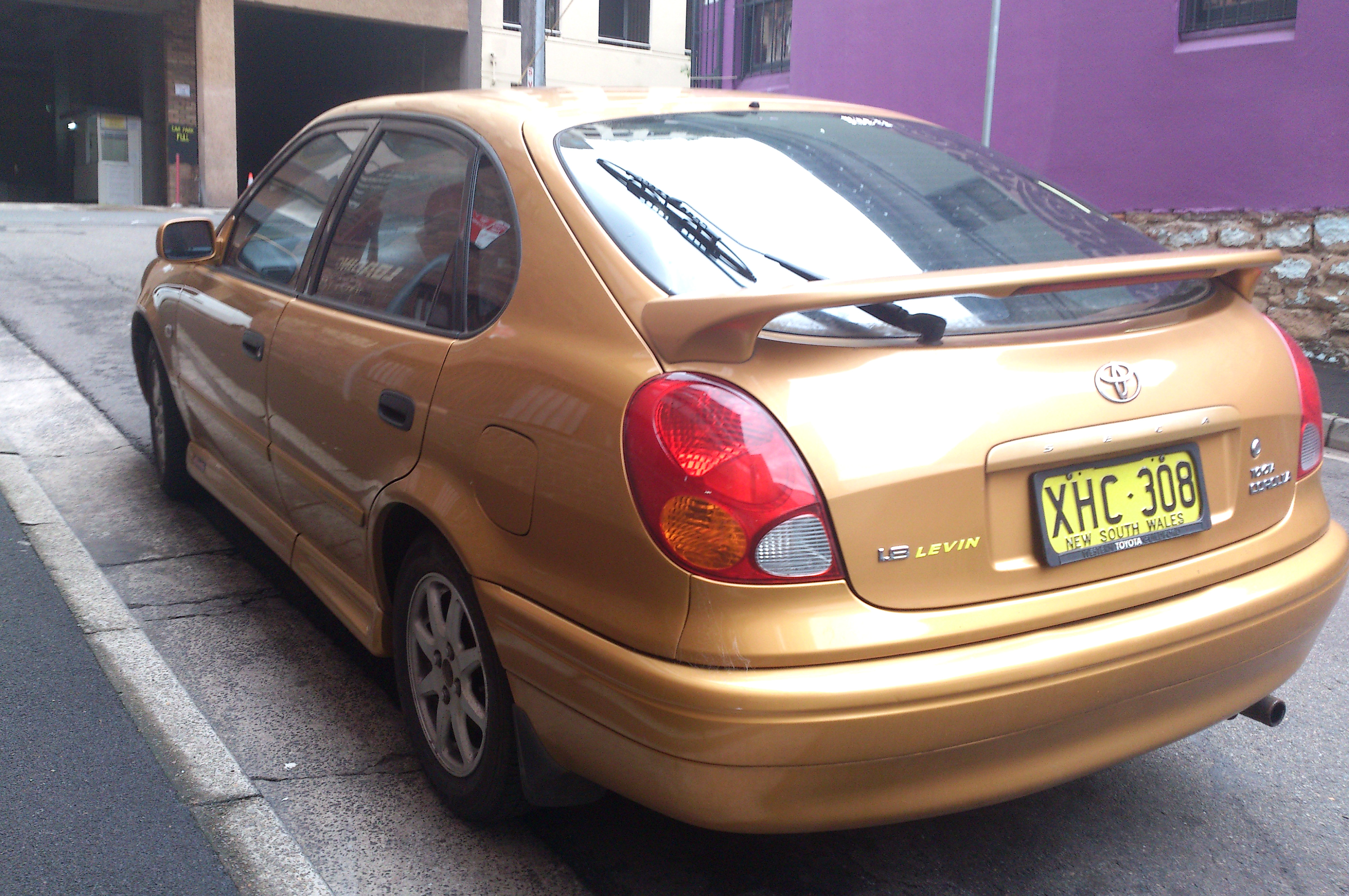
Corolla Seca Levin (AE112, Australia)

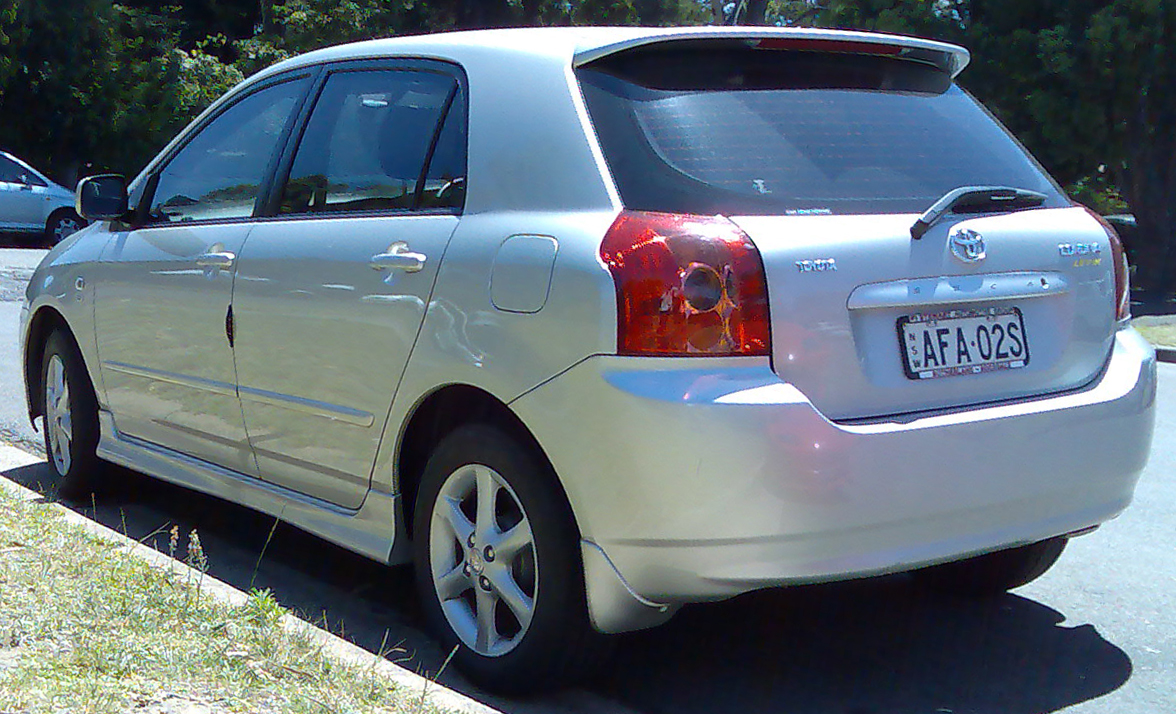
Corolla Seca Levin (ZZE122, Australia)

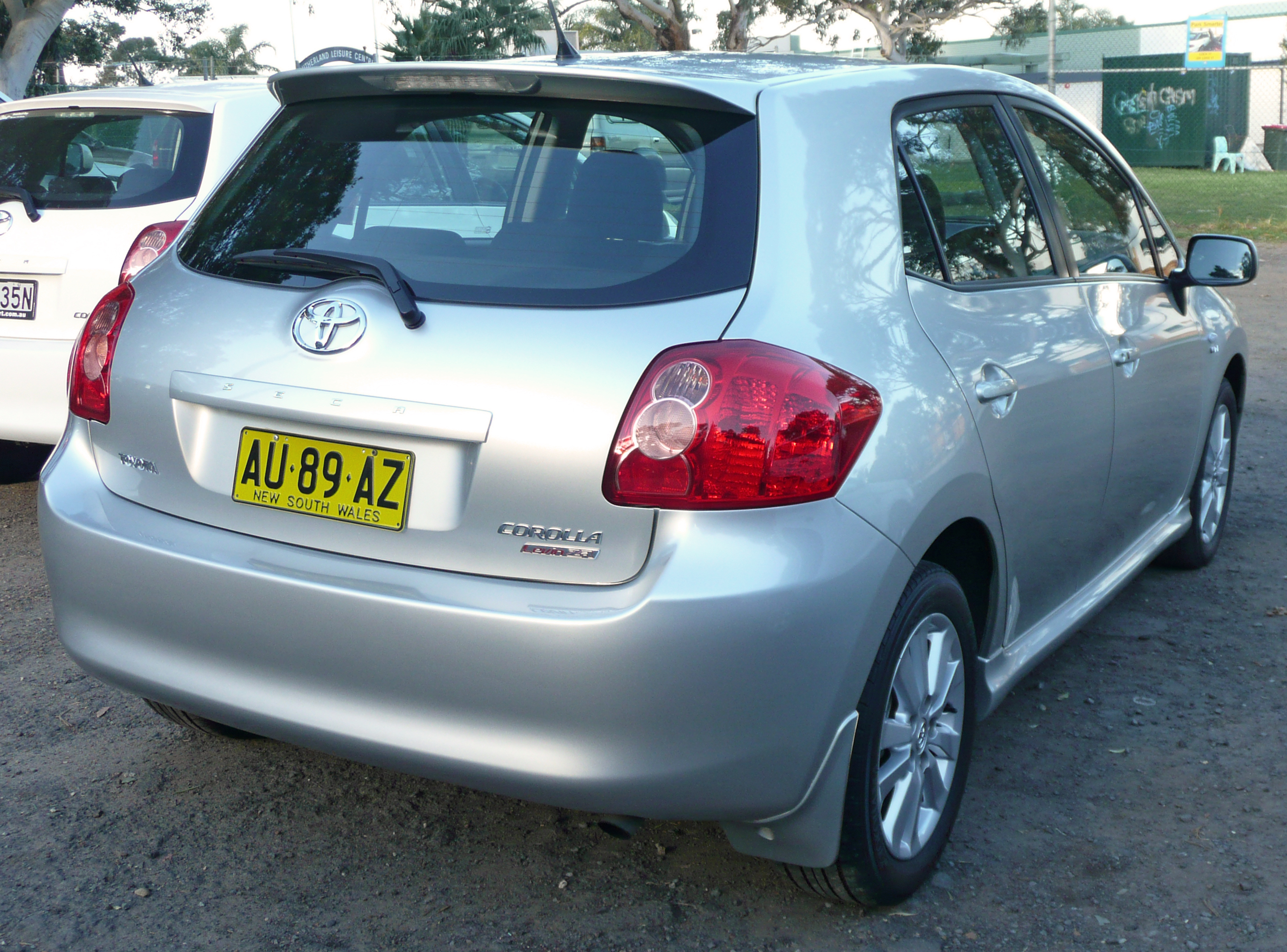
Corolla Seca Levin ZR (ZRE152, Australia)

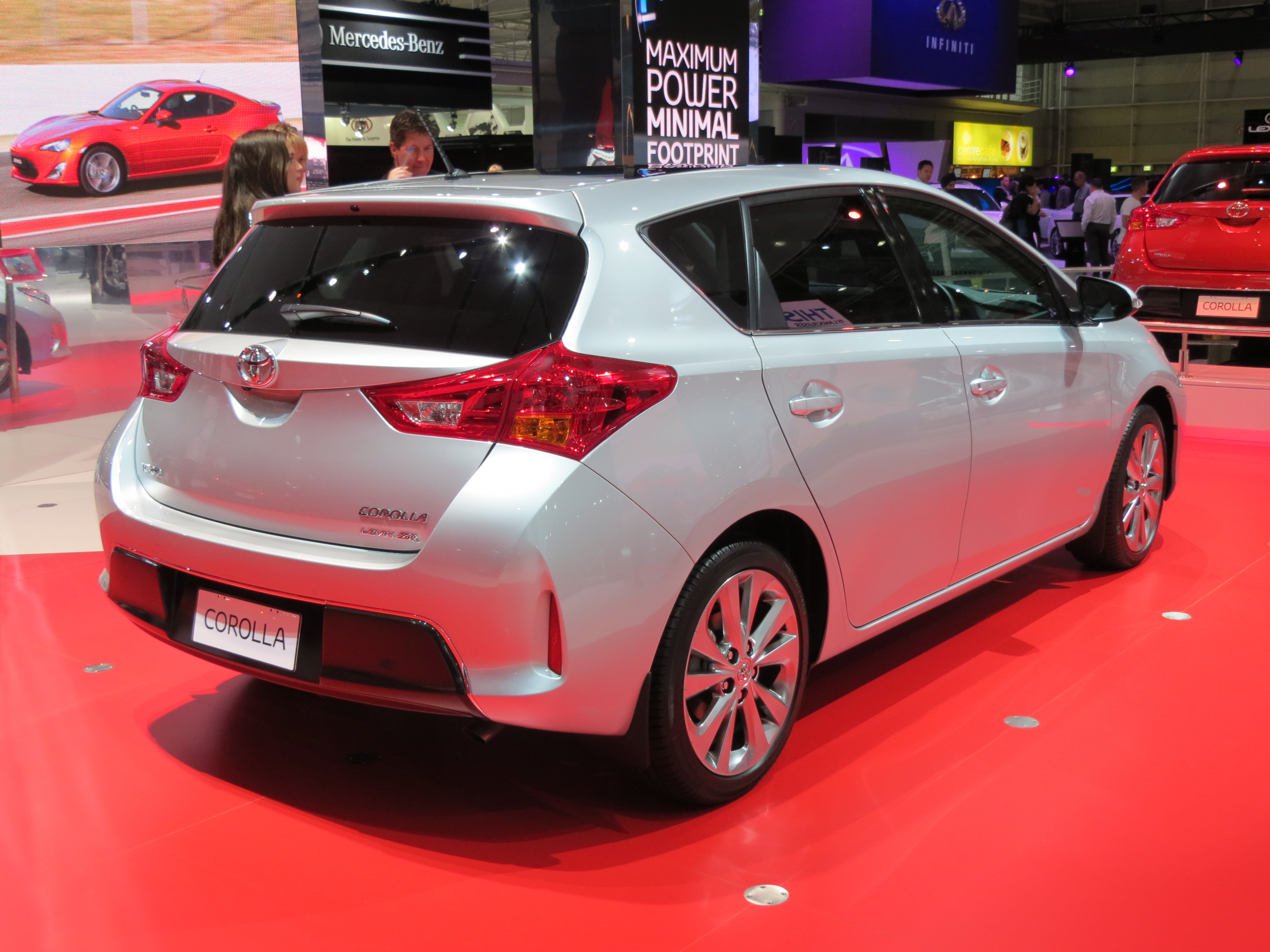
Corolla Levin ZR (ZRE182, Australia)

In China, the sporty twin models of E180 and E210 Corolla saloons manufactured by GAC Toyota are sold under the Levin (Chinese: 雷凌; pinyin: Léilíng) name. The E180 Levin was based on the North American market Corolla L/LE but featured a different grill, headlights, wings and taillights. In 2015, the line up was expanded with Hybrid and PHEV models which featured a different front bumper.

For the E210 Levin, the models were split into two versions: regular Levin and Levin Sport, which were based on the international market "sporty" Corolla and North American market Corolla SE/XSE, respectively. There was also a long wheelbase version of the Levin Sport called Levin GT (Chinese: 凌尚; pinyin: Língshàng). In 2025, the Levin lineup was simplified to a single model called Levin L, based on the long wheelbase Levin GT with Levin Sport styling.

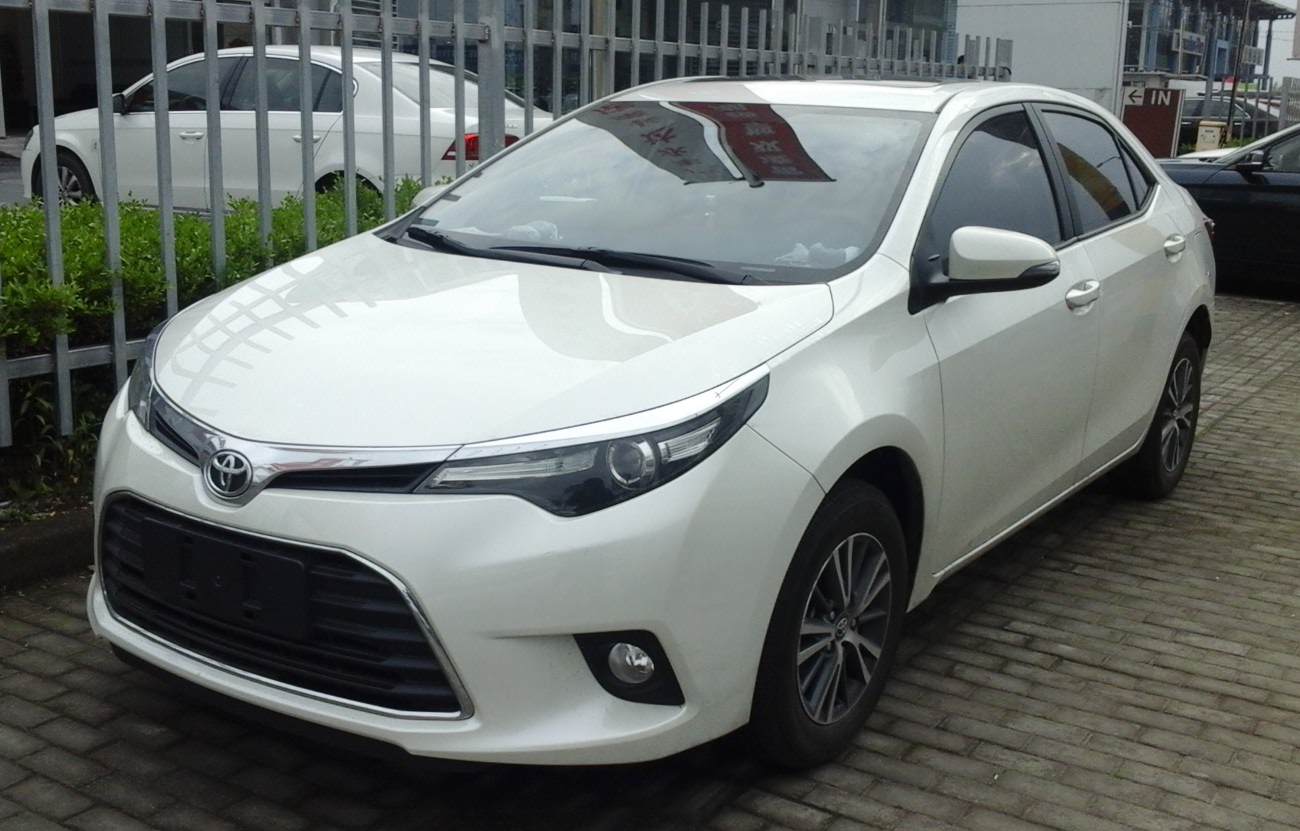
GAC Toyota Levin (ZRE181, China, pre-facelift)

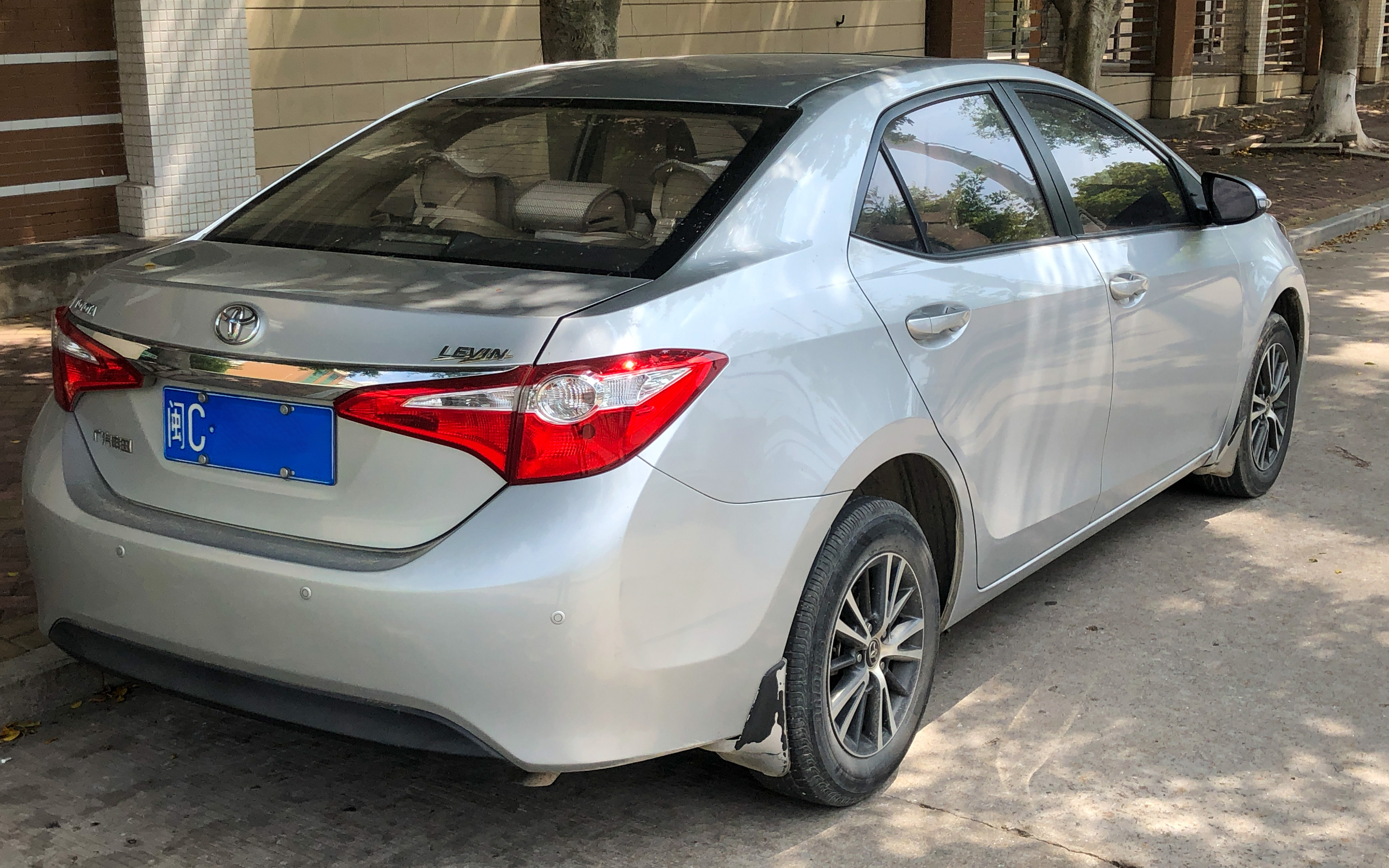
GAC Toyota Levin (ZRE181, China, pre-facelift)

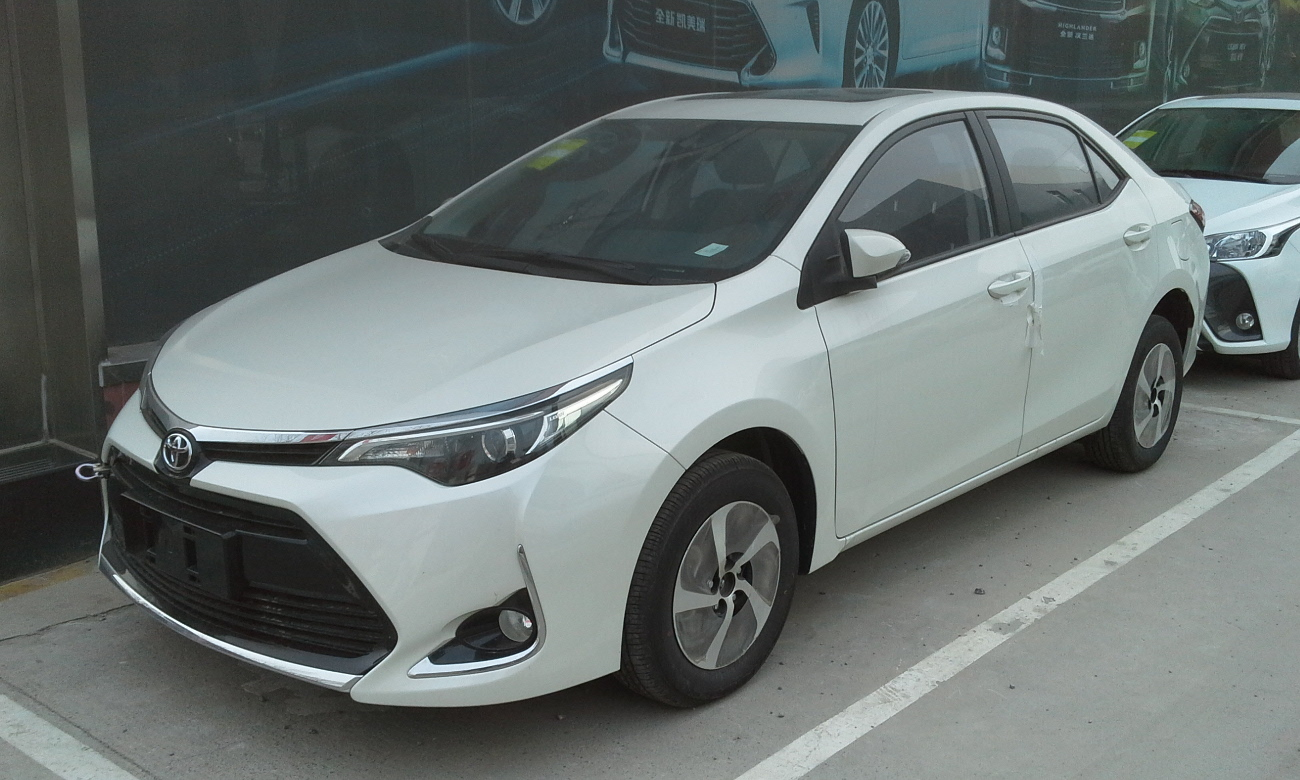
GAC Toyota Levin (NRE181, China, facelift)

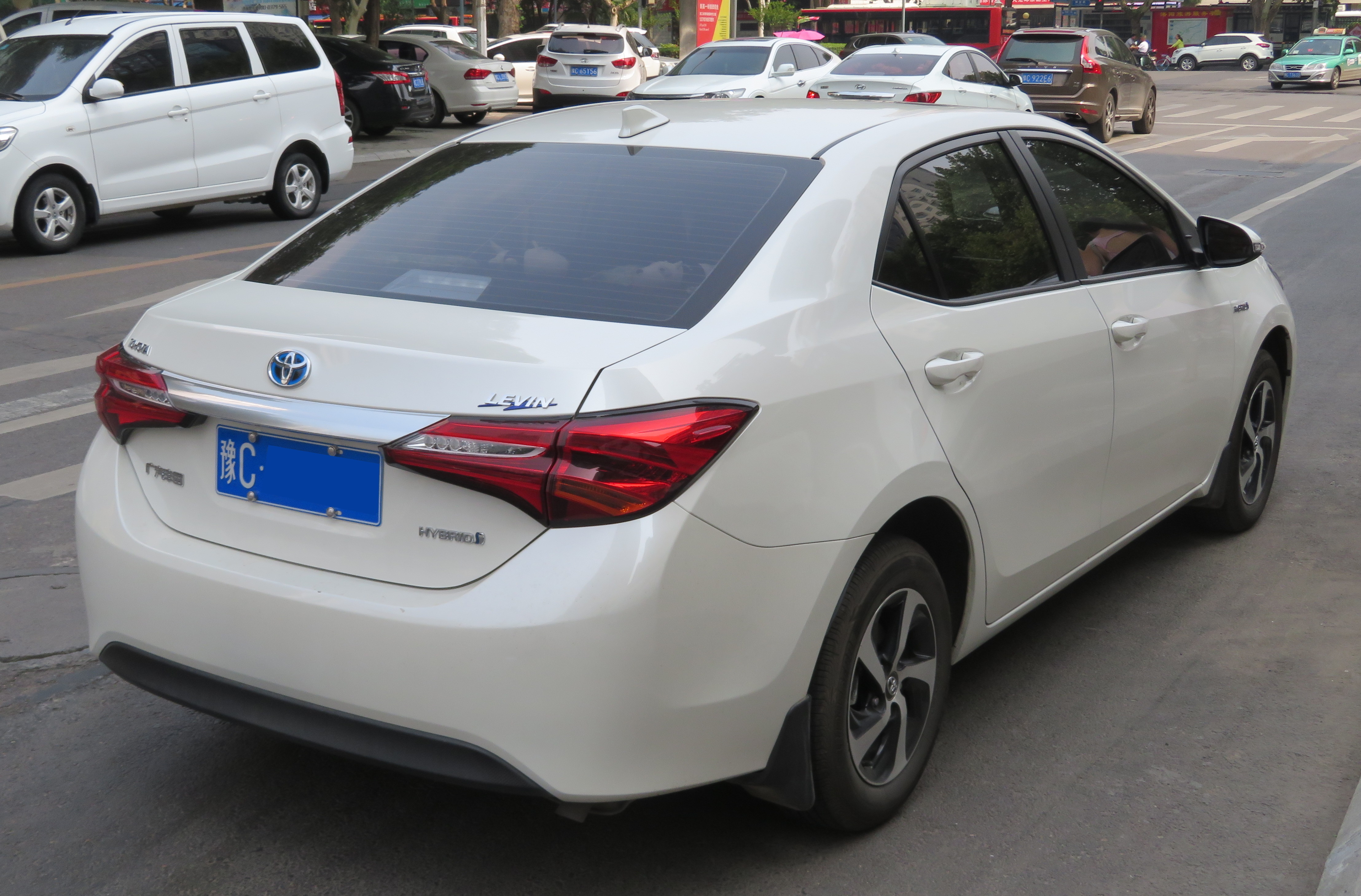
GAC Toyota Levin Hybrid (ZWE182, China, facelift)

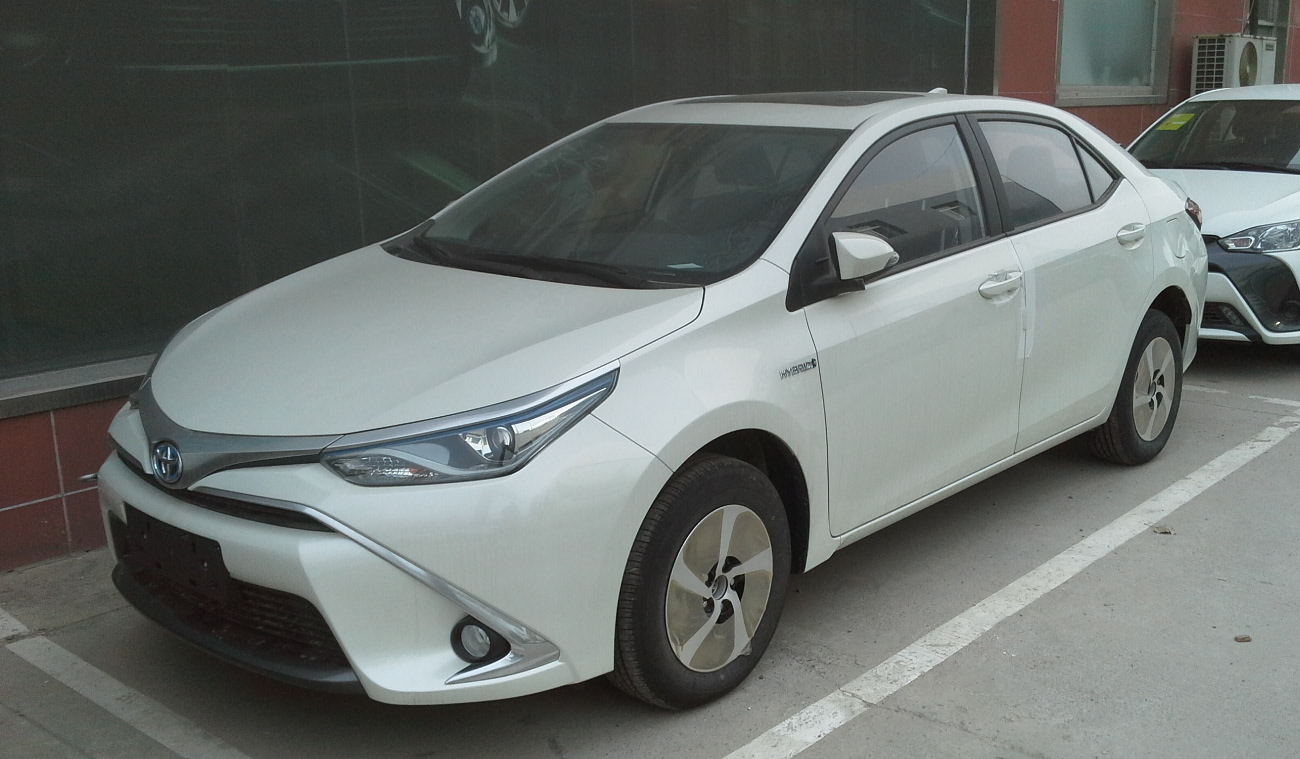
GAC Toyota Levin Hybrid (ZWE182, China)

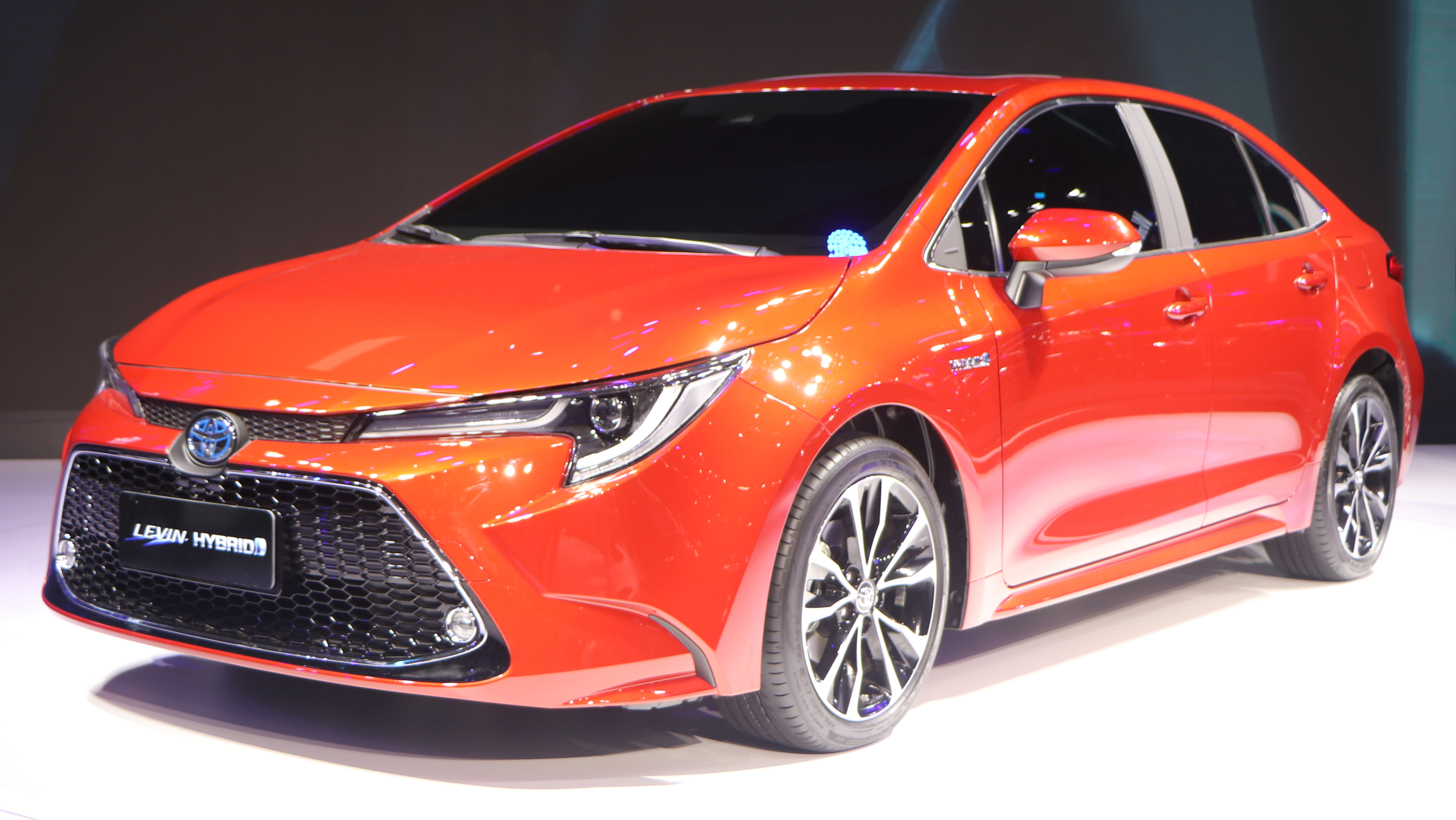
GAC Toyota Levin Hybrid (ZWE211, China, pre-facelift), based on the regular "sporty" E210 Corolla

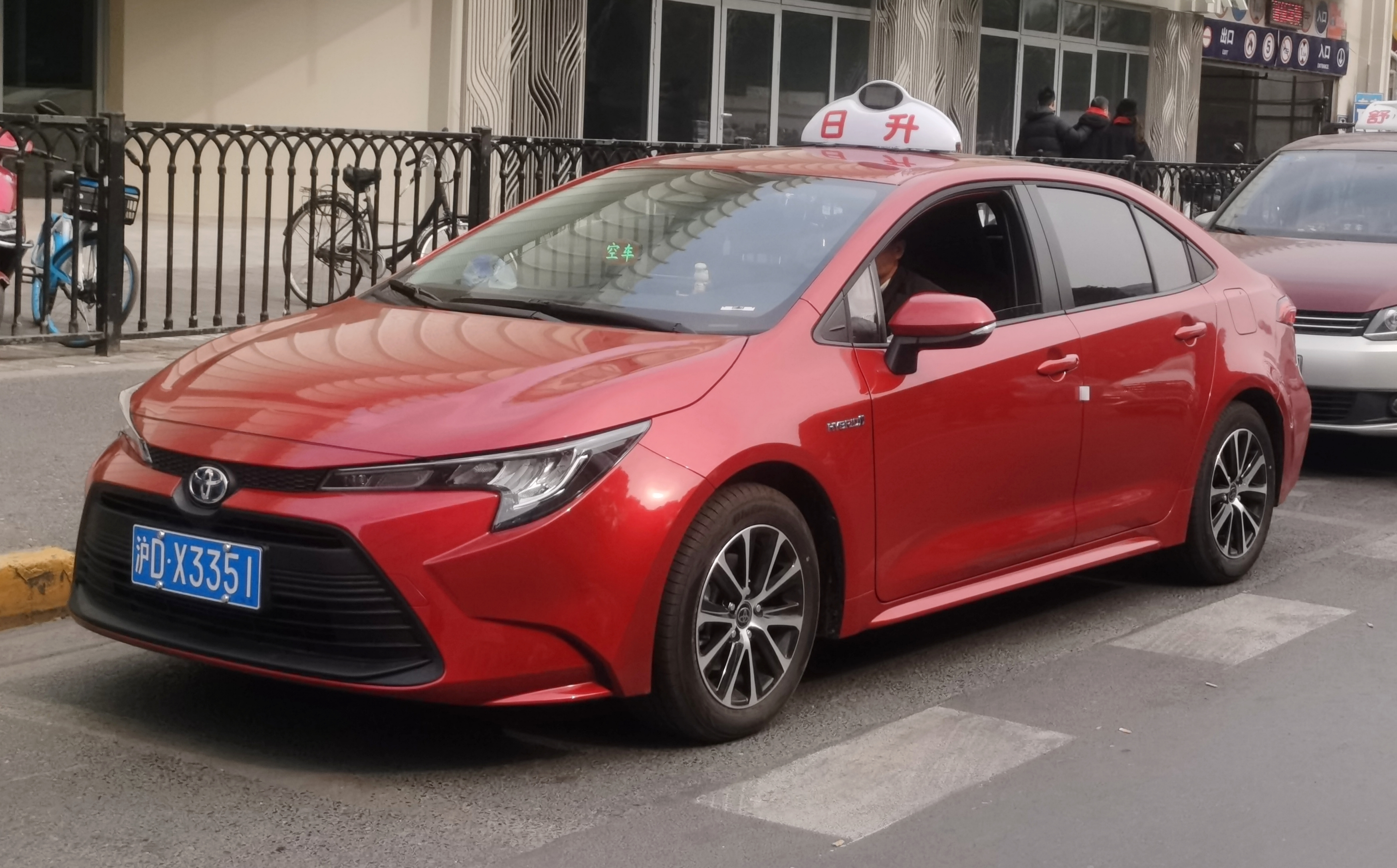
GAC Toyota Levin Hybrid (ZWE219, China, facelift)

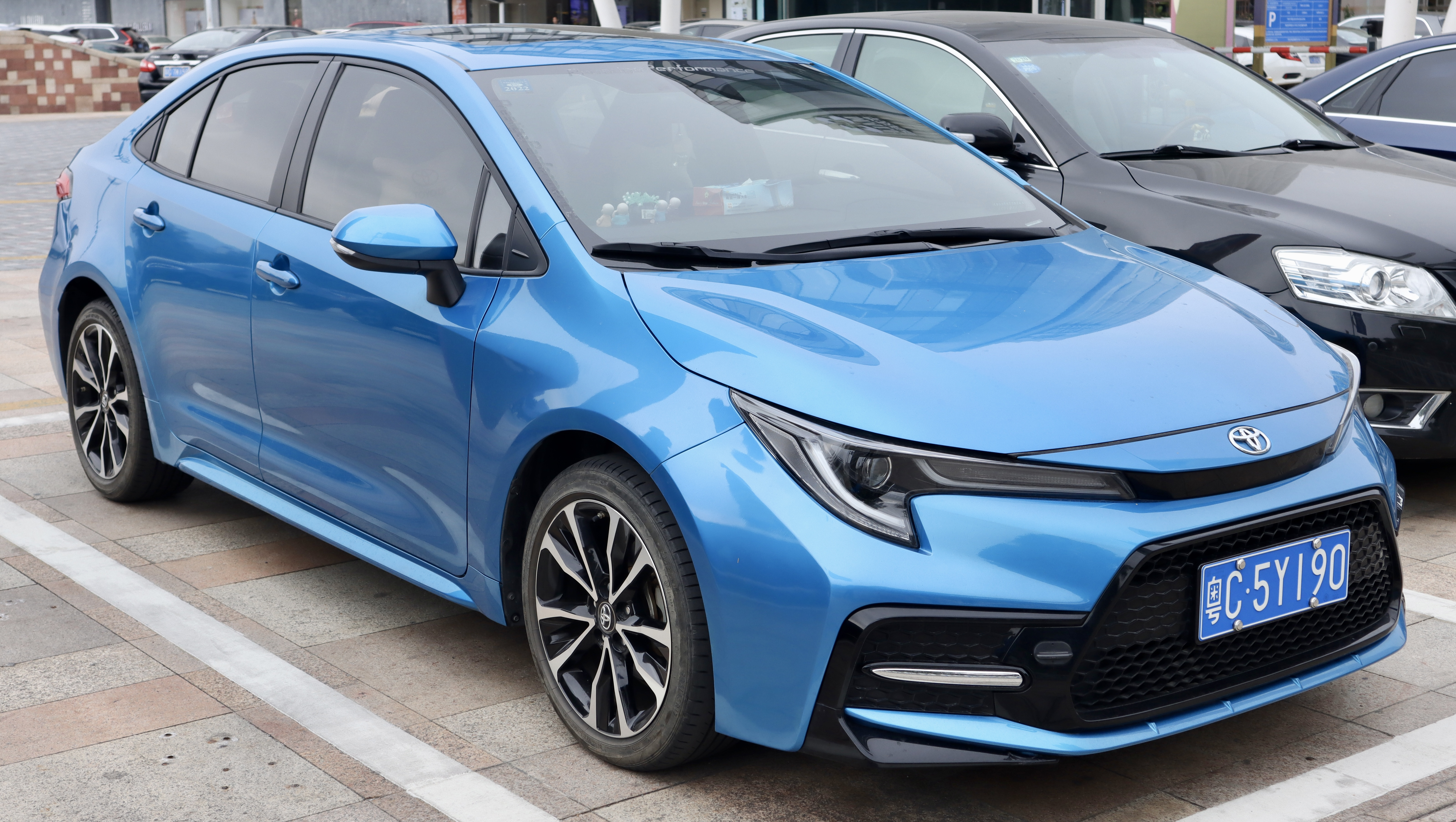
GAC Toyota Levin Sport (NRE210, China), based on the North American market E210 Corolla SE/XSE models

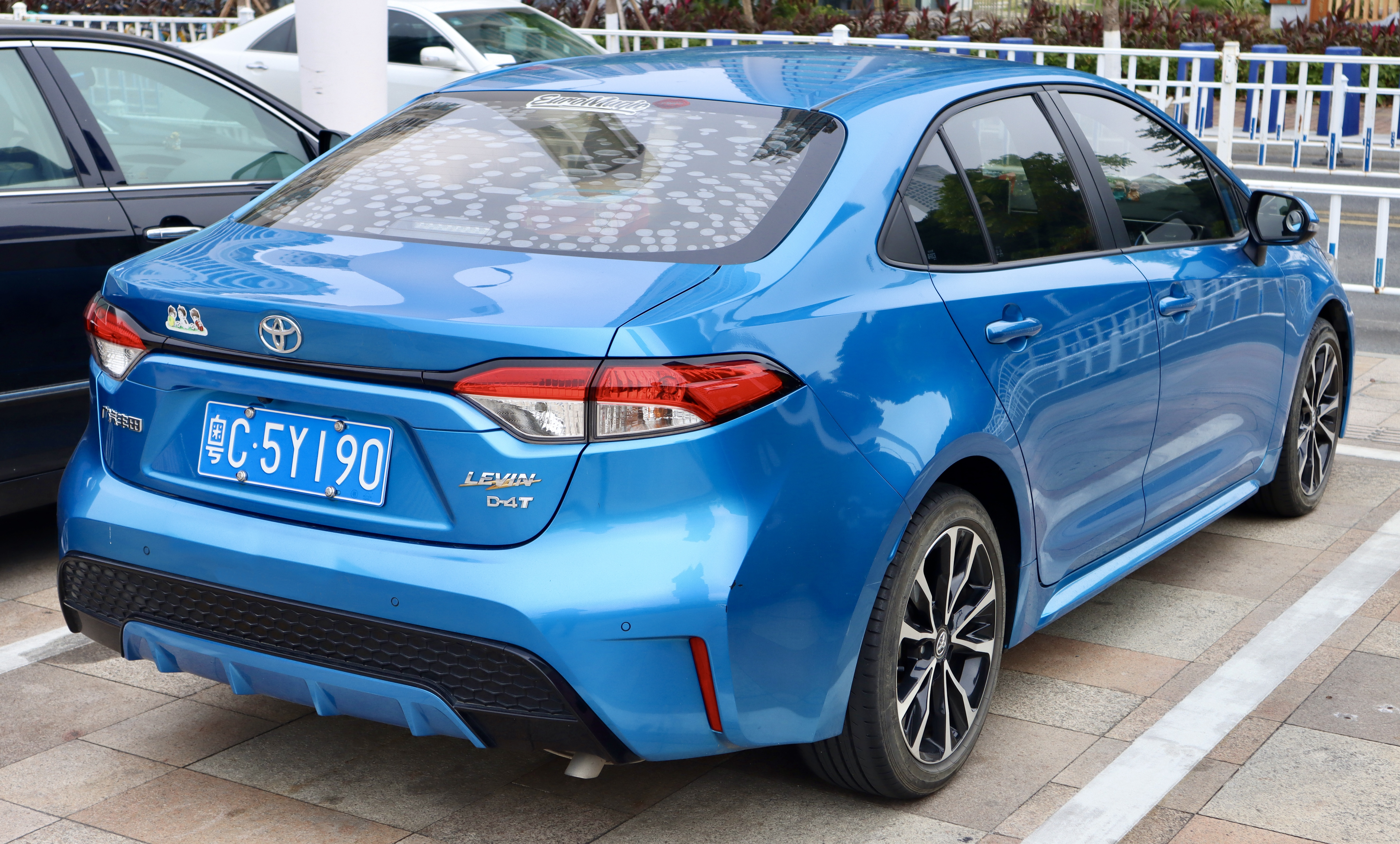
GAC Toyota Levin Sport (NRE210, China)

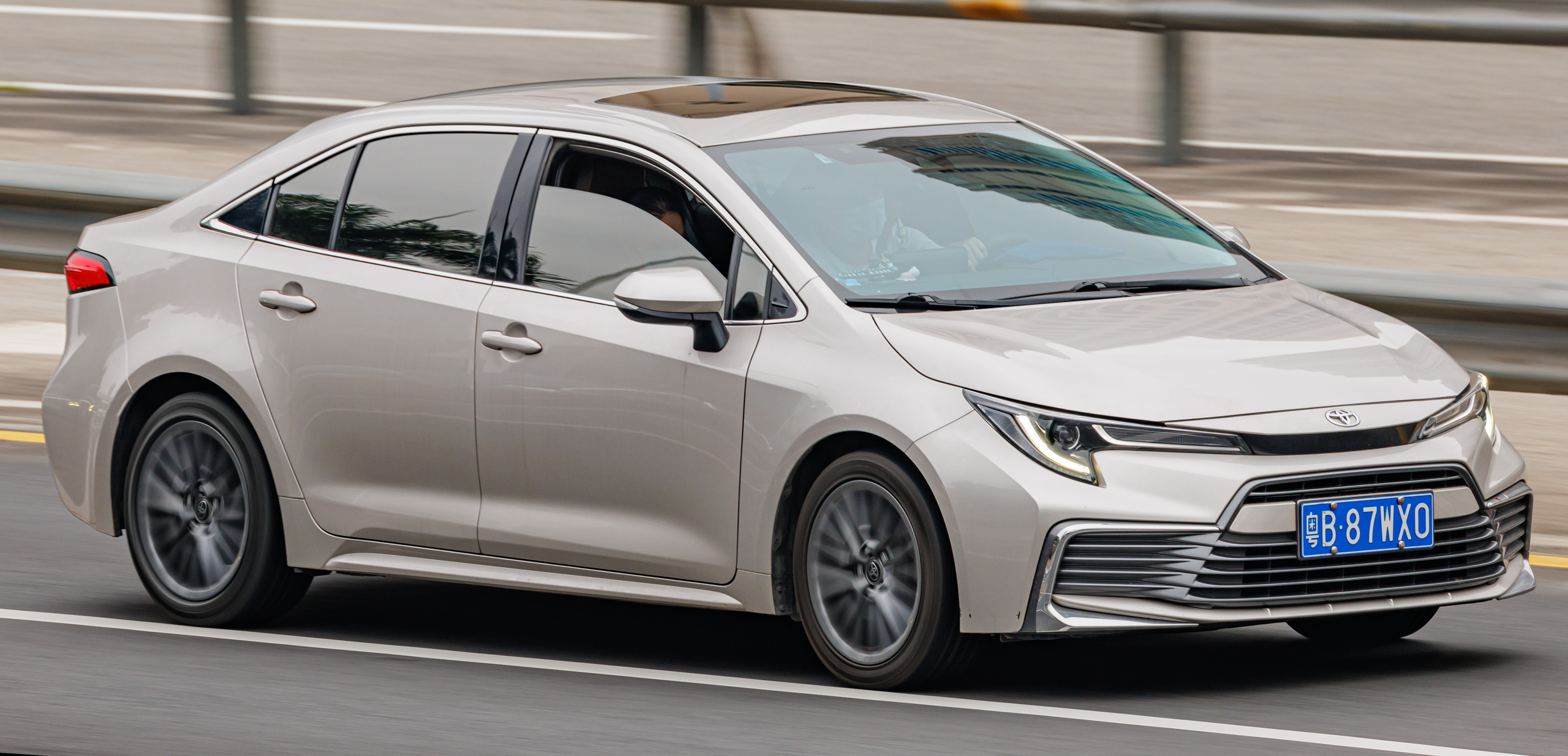
GAC Toyota Levin GT (MZEA12, China)

In June 2023, a limited edition of the GR86 called the Trueno Edition was introduced to celebrate the 40th anniversary of the AE86 Sprinter Trueno. It is available exclusively for the North American market and is limited to 860 units.

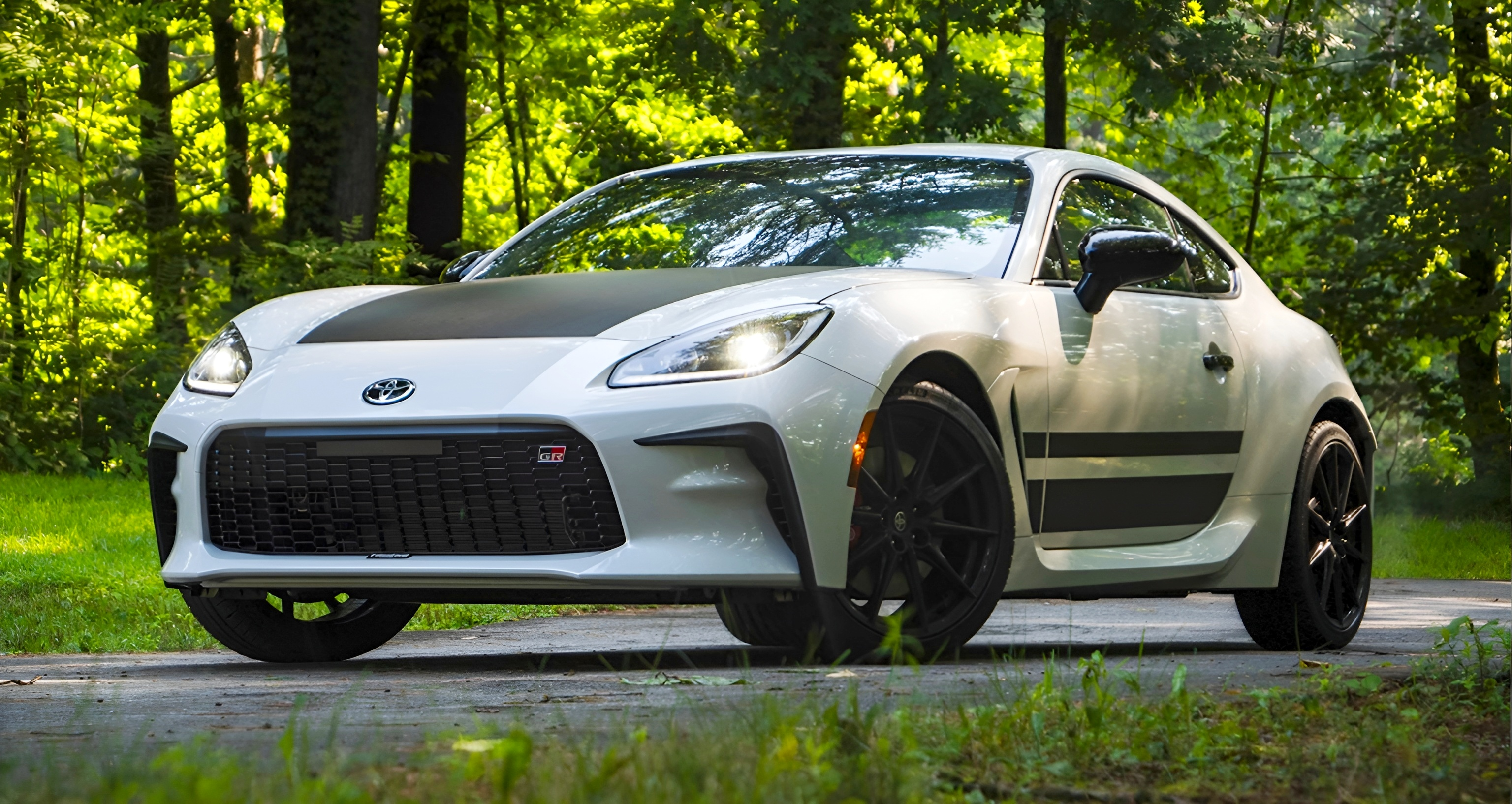
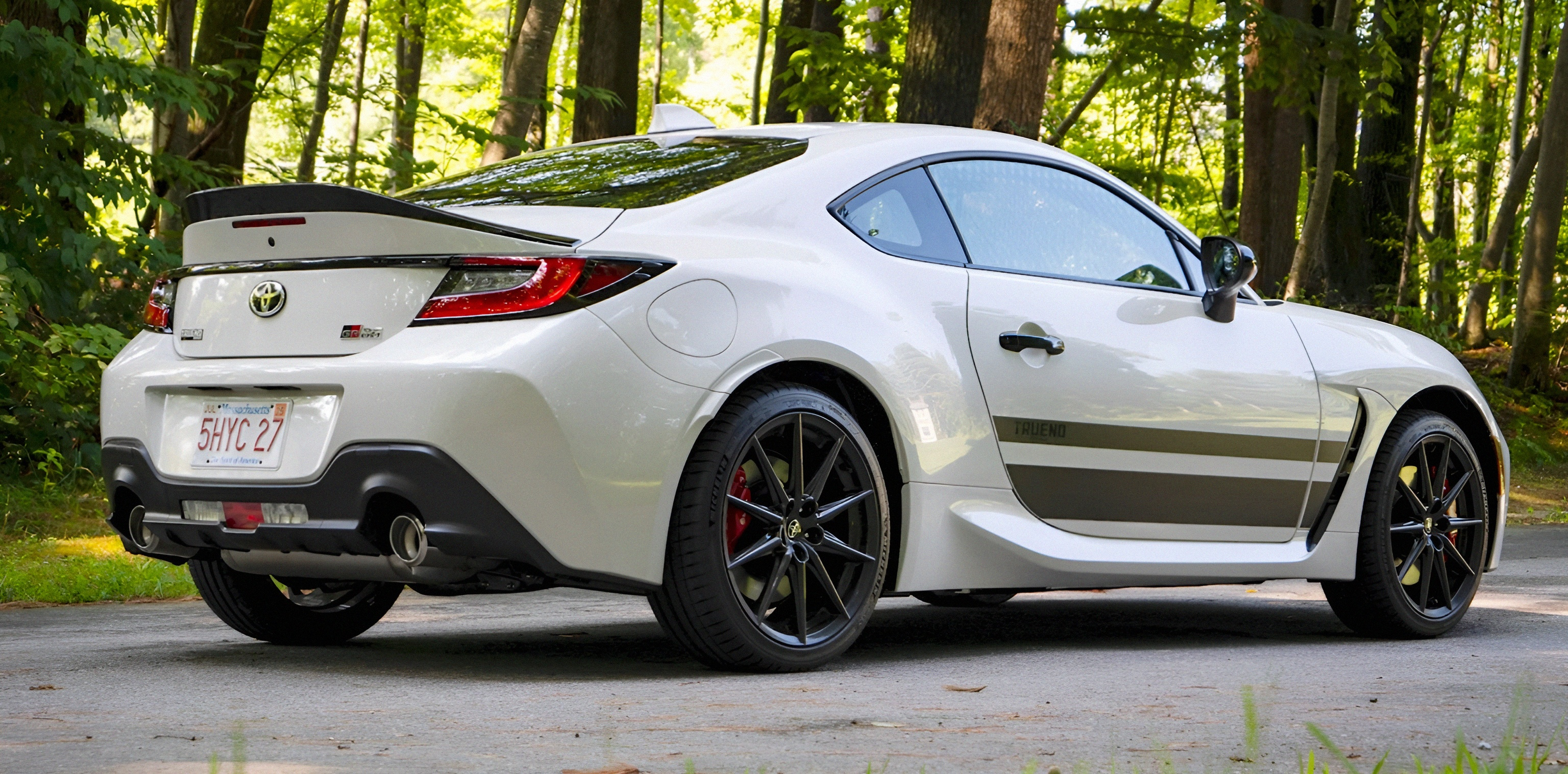
Toyota GR86 Trueno Edition (ZN8, North America)

== See also ==
- Toyota Corolla
- Toyota Sprinter
- List of Toyota vehicles
