= TVIS =

TVIS may refer to:

- T-VIS, which stands for Toyota Variable Induction System, is a variable intake system designed by Toyota.
- Treadmill with Vibration Isolation System is a treadmill which has been designed for use on the International Space Station.
