= Toyota A engine =

Family of internal combustion engines

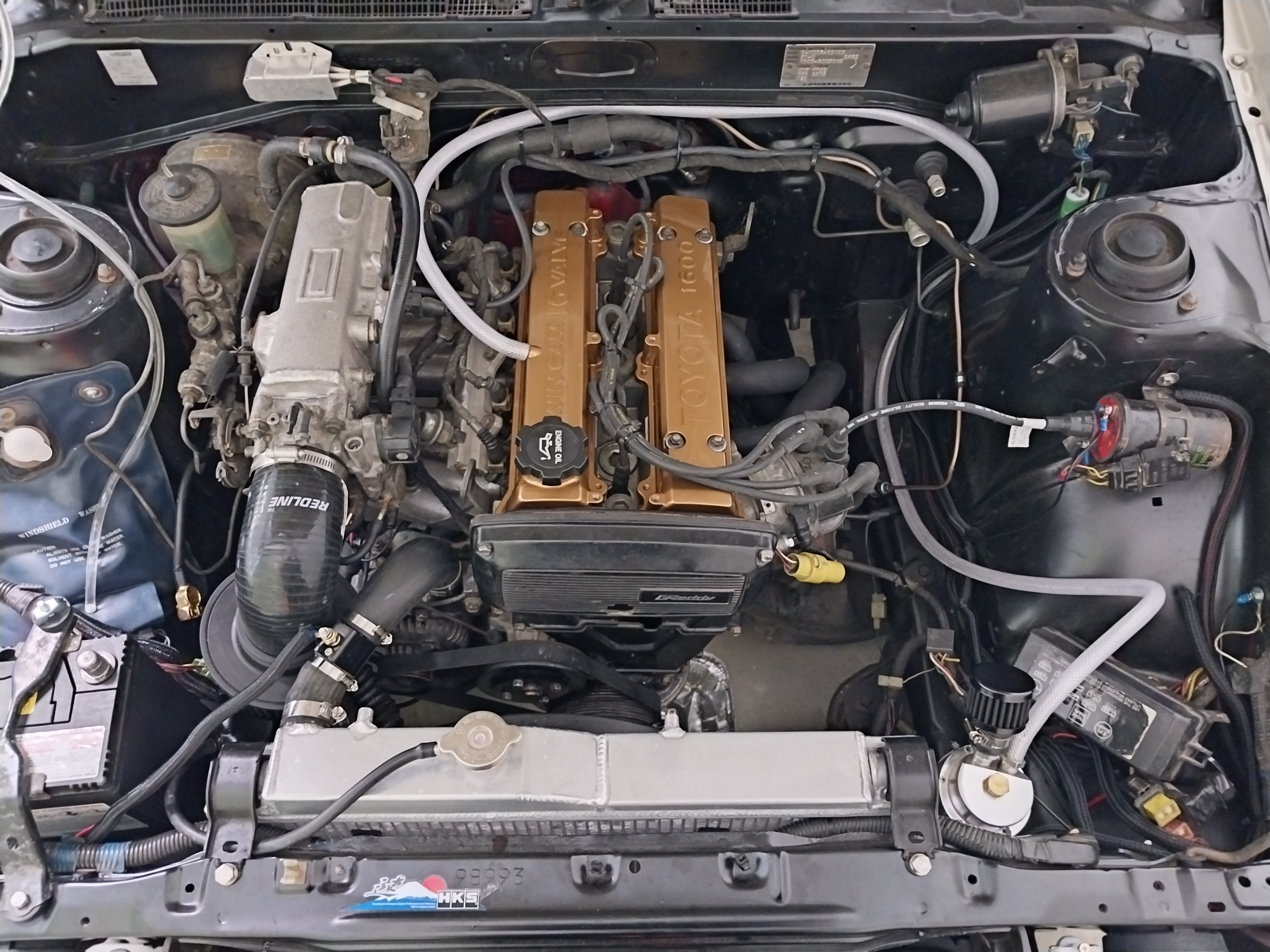
- 4A-GE engine

Overview
- Manufacturer: Toyota
- Production: 1978–2006

Layout
- Configuration: Inline 4
- Cylinder block material: Cast iron
- Cylinder head material: Aluminum
- Valvetrain: SOHC, DOHC

Combustion
- Fuel system: Carbureted, Fuel injected
- Fuel type: Gasoline

The Toyota A Series engines are a family of inline-four internal combustion engines with displacement from 1.3 L to 1.8 L produced by Toyota Motor Corporation. The series has cast iron engine blocks and aluminum cylinder heads. To make the engine as short as possible, the cylinders are siamesed.

The development of the series began in the late 1970s, when Toyota wanted to develop a completely new engine for the Toyota Tercel, the successor of Toyota's K engine. The goal was to achieve good fuel efficiency and performance as well as low emissions with a modern design. The A-series includes one of the first Japanese mass-production DOHC, four-valve-per-cylinder engines, the 4A-GE, and a later version of the same engine was one of the first production five-valve-per-cylinder engines.

Toyota joint venture partner Tianjin FAW Xiali produces the 1.3 L 8A and resumed production of the 5A in 2007.

== 1A ==
1A

Overview
- Manufacturer: Toyota
- Production: 1978–1980

Layout
- Configuration: Inline-four engine
- Displacement: 1.5 L (1,452 cc)
- Cylinder bore: 77.5 mm (3.05 in)
- Piston stroke: 77 mm (3.03 in)
- Cylinder block material: Cast iron
- Cylinder head material: Aluminum
- Valvetrain: SOHC 2 valves x cyl.
- Compression ratio: 9.0:1

Combustion
- Fuel system: Single 2-barrel downdraft carburetor
- Fuel type: Gasoline
- Cooling system: Water cooled

Output
- Power output: 80 PS (59 kW; 79 hp)
- Torque output: 11.5 kg⋅m (113 N⋅m; 83 lbf⋅ft)

Chronology
- Predecessor: T
- Successor: 3A

The 1.5 L 1A was produced between 1978 and 1980. All variants were belt-driven 8-valve counter-flow SOHC engines with a single, twin-barrel downdraft carburetor. It used Toyota's Turbulence Generating Pot (TGP) lean combustion system to meet Japanese emissions standards at the time with only an oxidation (2-way) catalyst. The 1A engine was only 550 mm (21.6 in) long.

=== 1A-C ===
Applications:

- AL10 Tercel

=== 1A-U ===
Using Toyota two-way catalyst.

Output:

- 80 PS (59 kW; 79 hp) at 5,600 rpm and 11.5 kg⋅m (113 N⋅m) at 3,600 rpm (compression at 9.0:1)

Applications:

- AL10 Tercel/Corsa (Japan only)

== 2A ==
2A
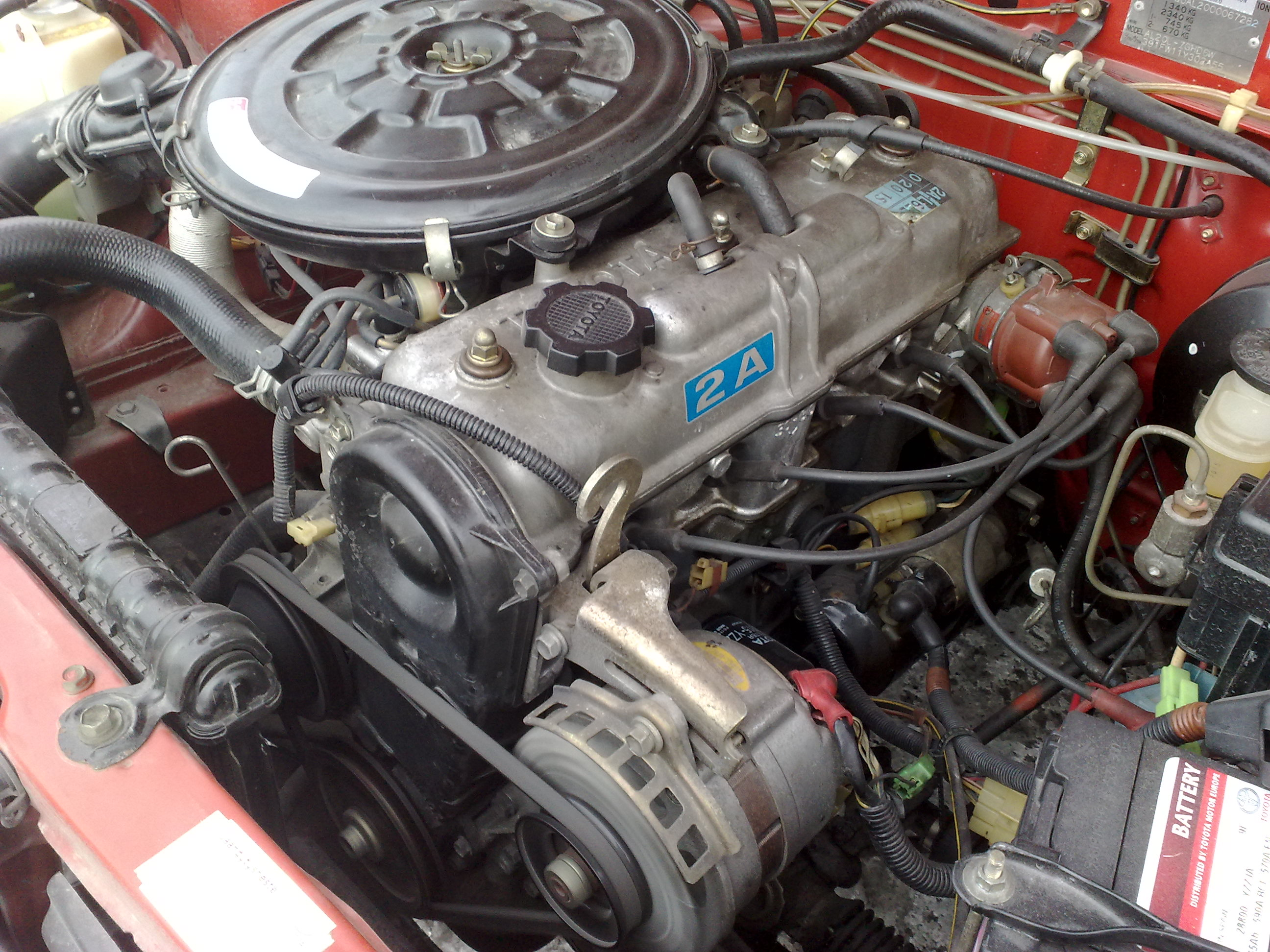

Overview
- Manufacturer: Toyota
- Production: 1979–1989

Layout
- Configuration: Inline 4
- Displacement: 1.3 L; 79.0 cu in (1,295 cc)
- Cylinder bore: 76 mm (2.99 in)
- Piston stroke: 71.4 mm (2.81 in)
- Cylinder block material: cast-iron
- Cylinder head material: aluminum
- Valvetrain: SOHC 2 valves x cyl.
- Compression ratio: 9.3:1

Combustion
- Fuel system: Single downdraft carburetor
- Fuel type: Gasoline
- Cooling system: Water cooled

Output
- Power output: 65 PS (48 kW; 64 hp); 75 PS (55 kW; 74 hp)
- Torque output: 98 N⋅m (72 lb⋅ft); 106 N⋅m (78 lb⋅ft)

Chronology
- Predecessor: 4K
- Successor: 2E

The 1.3 L 2A was produced from 1979 through 1989. 2A engines in 1982 onwards AL20 Tercels have a slightly different valve cover and timing belt cover than early AL11 Tercels, as well as an automatic choke, and automatically controlled hot air intake (HAI) system. It also has higher compression ratio, and reformulated combustion chambers to improve the fuel economy and emissions. All variants used belt-driven SOHC eight-valve counter-flow cylinder heads with a single downdraft carburetor.

=== 2A, 2A-L, 2A-LC ===
Output:

- 65 PS (48 kW; 64 hp) at 6,000 rpm and 98 N⋅m (72 lb⋅ft) at 3,800 rpm (compression at 9.3:1)

Applications:

- AE80 Corolla 1983–1985 (excluding Japan, 2A-LC in Australia)
- AL11 Tercel 1979–1982 (excluding Japan and North America)
- AL20 Tercel 1982–1984 (excluding Japan and North America)

=== 2A-U, 2A-LU ===
Using Toyota TTC-C catalytic converter.

Output:

- 75 PS (55 kW; 74 hp) at 6,000 rpm and 106 N⋅m (78 lb⋅ft) at 3,600 rpm (compression at 9.3:1)

Applications:

- AE80 Corolla 1983–1985 (Japan only)
- AL20 Corolla II 1982–1986 (Japan only)
- AL11 Corsa (Japan only)
- AL20 Corsa 1982–1989 (Japan only)
- AE80 Sprinter 1983–1985 (Japan only)
- AL11 Tercel
- AL20 Tercel 1982–1989 (Japan only)

== 3A ==
3A
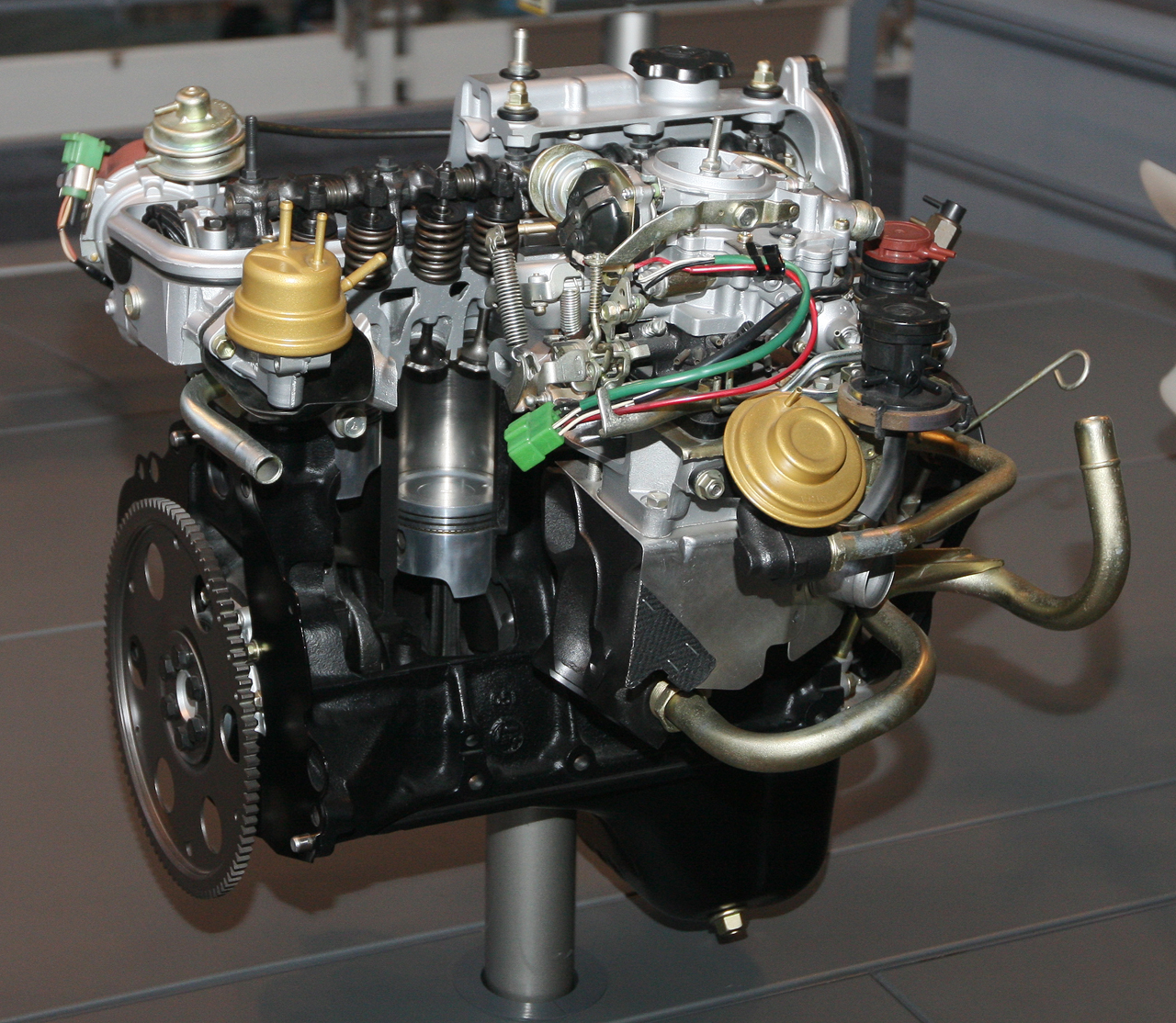
- 1979 Toyota 3A-U engine

Overview
- Manufacturer: Toyota
- Production: 1979–1989

Layout
- Configuration: Inline 4
- Displacement: 1,452 cc (1.5 L)
- Cylinder bore: 77.5 mm (3.05 in)
- Piston stroke: 77 mm (3.03 in)
- Cylinder block material: Cast iron
- Cylinder head material: Aluminum
- Valvetrain: SOHC 2 valves x cyl.
- Compression ratio: 9.0:1, 9.3:1

Combustion
- Fuel system: Single carburetor
- Fuel type: Gasoline
- Cooling system: Water cooled

Output
- Power output: 71 PS (52 kW; 70 hp); 83.5 PS (61 kW; 82 hp); 86 PS (63 kW; 85 hp); 90 PS (66 kW; 89 hp)
- Torque output: 108 N⋅m (80 lb⋅ft); 118 N⋅m (87 lb⋅ft); 121 N⋅m (89 lb⋅ft)

Chronology
- Predecessor: 1A
- Successor: 5A, 3E

The 1.5 L 3A was produced from 1979 through 1989. The 3A engine is the successor of Toyota's first A engine, the 1A. All variants were belt-driven eight-valve counter-flow SOHC engines but no longer used Toyota's "Turbulence Generating Pot" pre-combustion system from the 1A.

=== 3A, 3A-C ===
Output:

- 71 PS (52 kW; 70 hp) at 5,600 rpm and 108 N⋅m (80 lb⋅ft) at 3,800 rpm (compression at 9.0:1, European spec)
- 60 hp (45 kW; 61 PS) at 4,500 rpm (N. America, AL-21 3 door liftback)
- 62 hp (46 kW; 63 PS) at 4,800 rpm (N. America, AL-25 5-door wagon)

Applications:

- AL12 Tercel 1979–1982 (excluding Japan)
- AL21/25 Tercel 1982–1988 (excluding Japan)

=== 3A-U, 3A-LU ===
Using Toyota TTC-C catalytic converter. On some models marked as 3A-II.

Output:

- 83.5 PS (61 kW; 82 hp) at 5,600 rpm and 118 N⋅m (87 lb⋅ft) at 3,600 rpm (compression at 9.0:1)

Applications:

- AA60 Carina 1981–1987 (Japan only)
- AT150 Carina 1984–1988 (Japan only)
- AE70 Corolla 1979–1983 (Japan only)
- AE81/85 Corolla 1983–1987 (Japan only)
- AL21 Corolla II 1982–1986 (Japan only)
- AT140 Corona 1982–1987 (Japan only)
- AT150 Corona 1983–1987 (Japan only)
- AL12 Corsa (Japan only)
- AL21/25 Corsa 1982–1989 (Japan only)
- AW10 MR2 1984–1989 (Japan only)
- AE70 Sprinter 1979–1983 (Japan only)
- AE81/85 Sprinter 1983–1987 (Japan only)
- AL25 Sprinter Carib 1982–1988 (Japan only)
- AL21/25 Tercel 1982–1989 (Japan only)

=== 3A-HU ===
High compression version with Toyota TTC-C catalytic converter.

Output:

- 86 PS (63 kW; 85 hp) at 6,000 rpm and 121 N⋅m (89 lb⋅ft) at 4,000 rpm (compression at 9.3:1)

Applications:

- AL21 Corolla II 1982–1984 (Japan only)
- AL21 Corsa 1982–1984 (Japan only)
- AL21 Tercel 1982–1984 (Japan only)

=== 3A-SU ===
Twin carburetted swirl-intake version with Toyota TTC-C catalytic converter, introduced in August 1984 along with a facelift for the Tercel (and its sister variants) in Japan. Features two variable-venturi carburetors, which Toyota wanted to test in Japan before launching them in export along E series engine, albeit in single carburetted version. Because of the swirl-intake, the sealing surface between cylinder head and valve cover is different from other SOHC A-engines, featuring vertical curves on the manifold side of the head. Thus, those parts are not interchangeable between each other. The swirl was supposed to improve burning of the air-fuel mixture, thus enabling cleaner emissions, improving fuel economy, and increasing power.

Output:

- 90 PS (66 kW; 89 hp) at 6,000 rpm (compression at 9.3:1)

Applications:

- AL21 Corolla II 1984–1986 (Japan only)
- AL21/25 Corsa 1984–1989 (Japan only)
- AL25 Sprinter Carib 1984–1988 (Japan only)
- AL21/25 Tercel 1984–1989 (Japan only)

== 4A ==
4A
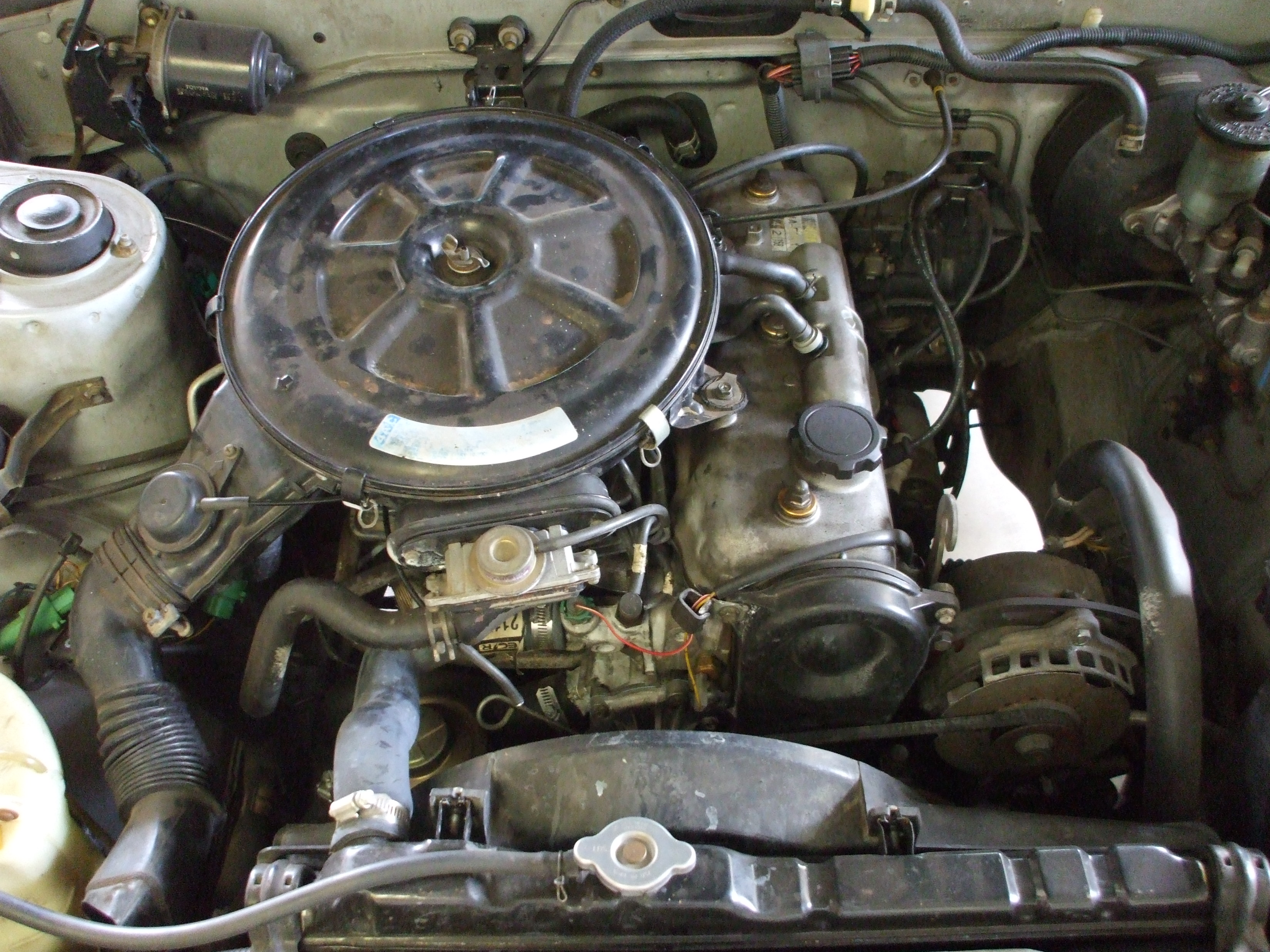
- 4A-C Engine in a 1987 AE86 SR5 Corolla

Overview
- Manufacturer: Toyota
- Production: 1982–2002

Layout
- Configuration: Inline-4
- Displacement: 1,587 cc (1.6 L)
- Cylinder bore: 81 mm (3.19 in)
- Piston stroke: 77 mm (3.03 in)
- Cylinder block material: Cast iron
- Cylinder head material: Aluminum
- Valvetrain: SOHC 2 valves x cyl.; DOHC 4 & 5 valves x cyl.
- Valvetrain drive system: Timing belt
- Compression ratio: 8.0:1, 8.9:1, 9.0:1, 9.3:1, 9.4:1, 9.5:1, 10.3:1, 10.5:1, 11.0:1

Combustion
- Supercharger: Toyota SC12 (4A-GZE)
- Turbocharger: No
- Fuel system: Carburetor; EFI
- Fuel type: Gasoline
- Oil system: Wet sump
- Cooling system: Water-cooled

Chronology
- Predecessor: 2T
- Successor: 3ZZ

The 4A was produced from 1980 through 2002. All 4A engines have a displacement of 1,587 cc (1.6 L). The cylinder bore was enlarged from the previous 3A engines at 81 mm (3.19 in), but the stroke remained the same as the 3A at 77 mm (3.03 in), giving it an over-square bore/stroke ratio which favours high engine speeds.

Numerous variations of the 4A design were produced, from basic SOHC 8-valve all the way to DOHC 20-valve versions. The power output also varied greatly between versions, from 52 kW (71 PS; 70 hp) at 4,800 rpm in the basic California-spec 4A-C to 125 kW (170 PS; 168 hp) at 6,400 rpm in the supercharged 4A-GZE.

=== 4A, 4A-C, 4A-L, 4A-LC ===
The basic 4A is a SOHC 8 valve carburated engine which produces 78–90 PS (57–66 kW; 77–89 hp) at 4800 rpm and 115 N⋅m (85 lb⋅ft) of torque at 2800 rpm, though the power and torque output figures vary between different regions of the world. in European versions, the combustion chambers were reformulated in early 1986, resulting in an increase of 2 hp, up to 63 kW (86 PS; 85 hp) at 5600 rpm, along with improvements in fuel economy and emissions.

North American market engines:

- 4A-LC 1.6 L I4, 8-valve SOHC, 52 kW (70 hp; 71 PS) at 4800 rpm
- 4A-C 1.6 L I4, 8-valve SOHC, 55 kW (74 hp; 75 PS) at 5200 rpm

European (and other) market engines: (excepting Sweden and Switzerland)

- 4A-L 1.6 L, I4, 8-valve SOHC, 58 kW (79 PS; 78 hp) at 5600 rpm, and torque 12.5 kg⋅m (123 N⋅m; 90 lbf⋅ft) at 4000 rpm (compression at 9.0:1) (Indonesia)
- 4A-L 1.6 L, I4, 8-valve SOHC, 62 kW (84 PS; 83 hp) at 5600 rpm, and torque 13.3 kg⋅m (130 N⋅m; 96 lbf⋅ft) at 3600 rpm (compression at 9.3:1) (Europe)

Australian/Swiss/Swedish market engines: Australia, Sweden, and Switzerland shared emissions rules for a period in the 1970s and eighties.

- 4A-LC 1.6 L, I4, 8-valve SOHC, 57 kW (78 PS; 77 hp) at 5600 rpm

Applications

- AT151 Carina II 1983–1987 (Europe only)
- AT160 Celica 1985–1989 (excluding Japan)
- AE71 Corolla 1982–1984 (North America, Australia & South Africa only)
- AE82/86 Corolla 1983–1987 (excluding Japan)
- AT151 Corona 1983–1987 (excluding Japan)
- A60 Daihatsu Charmant 1984-1987 (excluding Japan)
- Elfin Type 3 Clubman
- Chevrolet Nova (USA NUMMI rebadged Sprinter) 1985-1988

=== 4A-ELU ===
Fuel injection was added. This increased output to 74 kW (100 PS; 99 hp) at 5600 rpm and 13 kg⋅m (127 N⋅m; 94 lbf⋅ft) at 4000 rpm. This version is also equipped with Toyota TTC-C catalytic converter.

Applications:

- AT151 Carina 1984–1988 (Japan only)
- AE82 Corolla 1983–1987 (Japan only)
- AE82 Sprinter 1983–1987 (Japan only)

=== 4A-F ===
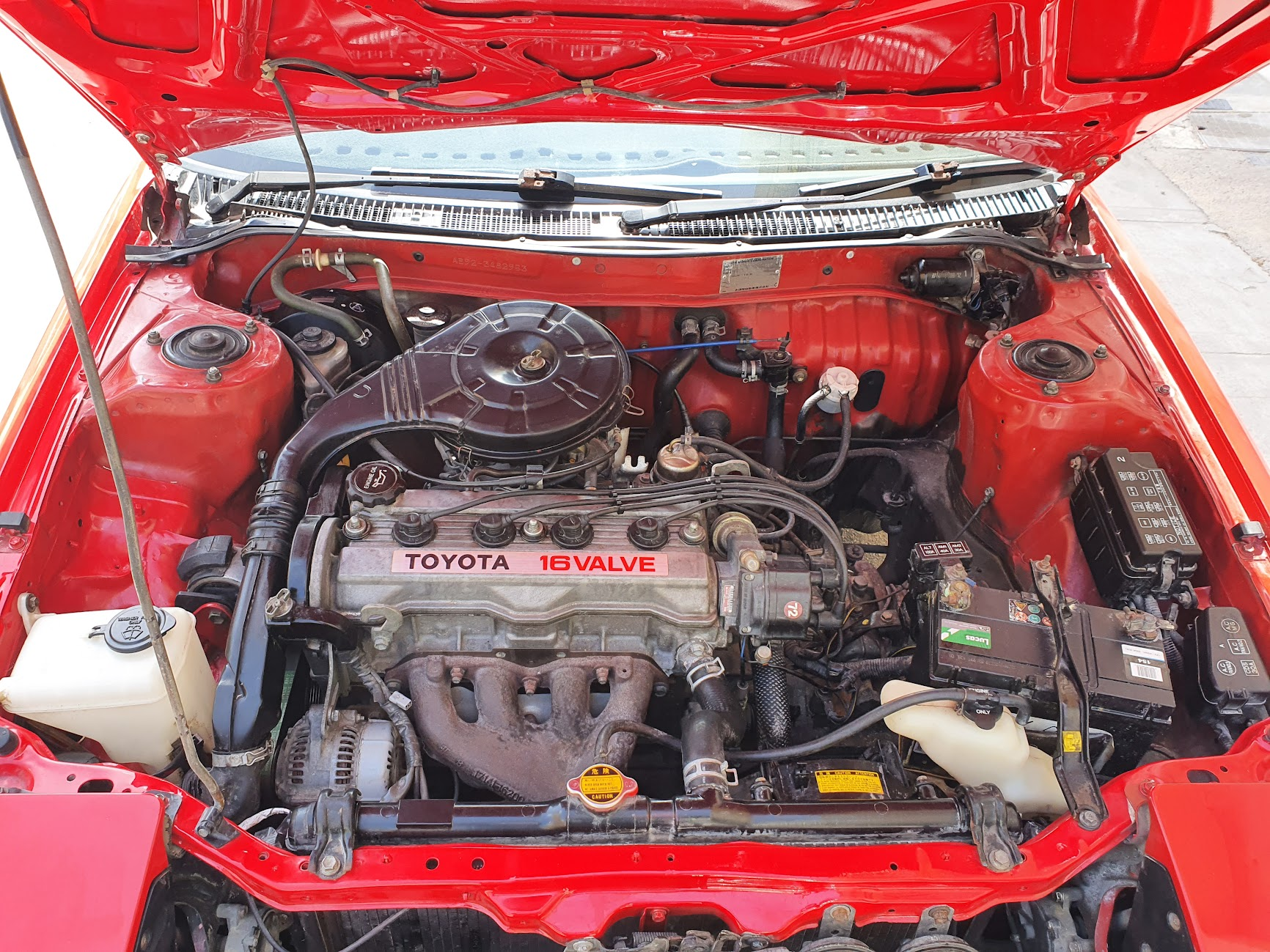
4A-F engine in AE92 Toyota Corolla XL coupé.

A narrow-valve (22.3°) DOHC 16-valve carburetor-equipped version, the 4A-F, was produced from 1987 through 1990. Output was 70 kW (94 hp) at 6,000 rpm and 13.8 kg⋅m (135 N⋅m) at 3,600 rpm (compression at 9.5:1, EU spec). This engine featured an aluminum-alloy cylinder head with scissor-gear driven twin overhead camshafts, centered spark plugs, and employed pent-roof combustion chambers which were designed to improve thermal efficiency. It also featured a fully counterweighted crankshaft with five journals and eight balance weights. The 4A-F was designed to provide more powerful torque in the low-to-mid RPM range as well improving top-end power output.

This engine was the first in the series to use Toyota's dual camshaft system known as High-Mecha Twin Cam, where the timing belt drives the exhaust camshaft and the exhaust camshaft then drives the inlet camshaft via scissor gears. The inlet camshaft acts as a slave camshaft to the exhaust camshaft (the latter acting as a master camshaft for the engine), which led to the system being unofficially known as the "slave-cam system". In contrast, on the 4A-GE engines, both camshafts are driven directly by the timing belts rather than being geared together.

There was a version which featured dual Weber carburetors for Thai market limited edition AE92 Corolla Sporty sedan in 1988, converted by TRD Thailand. It produced 78 kW (105 hp) at 6,000 rpm and 14.9 kg⋅m (146 N⋅m) at 4,200 rpm.

Applications:

- AT171 Carina II 1987–1992 (Europe only)
- AE92/95 Corolla 1987–1992 (excluding Japan)
- AE95 Corolla 1988–1989 (Japan only)
- AE101 Corolla 1992–1998 (Asia, Africa & Latin-America)
- AE111 Corolla 1997–2001 (Asia, Africa & Latin-America)
- AT171/177 Corona 1987–1992 (excluding Japan)
- AE95 Sprinter 1988–1989 (Japan only)

=== 4A-FE ===
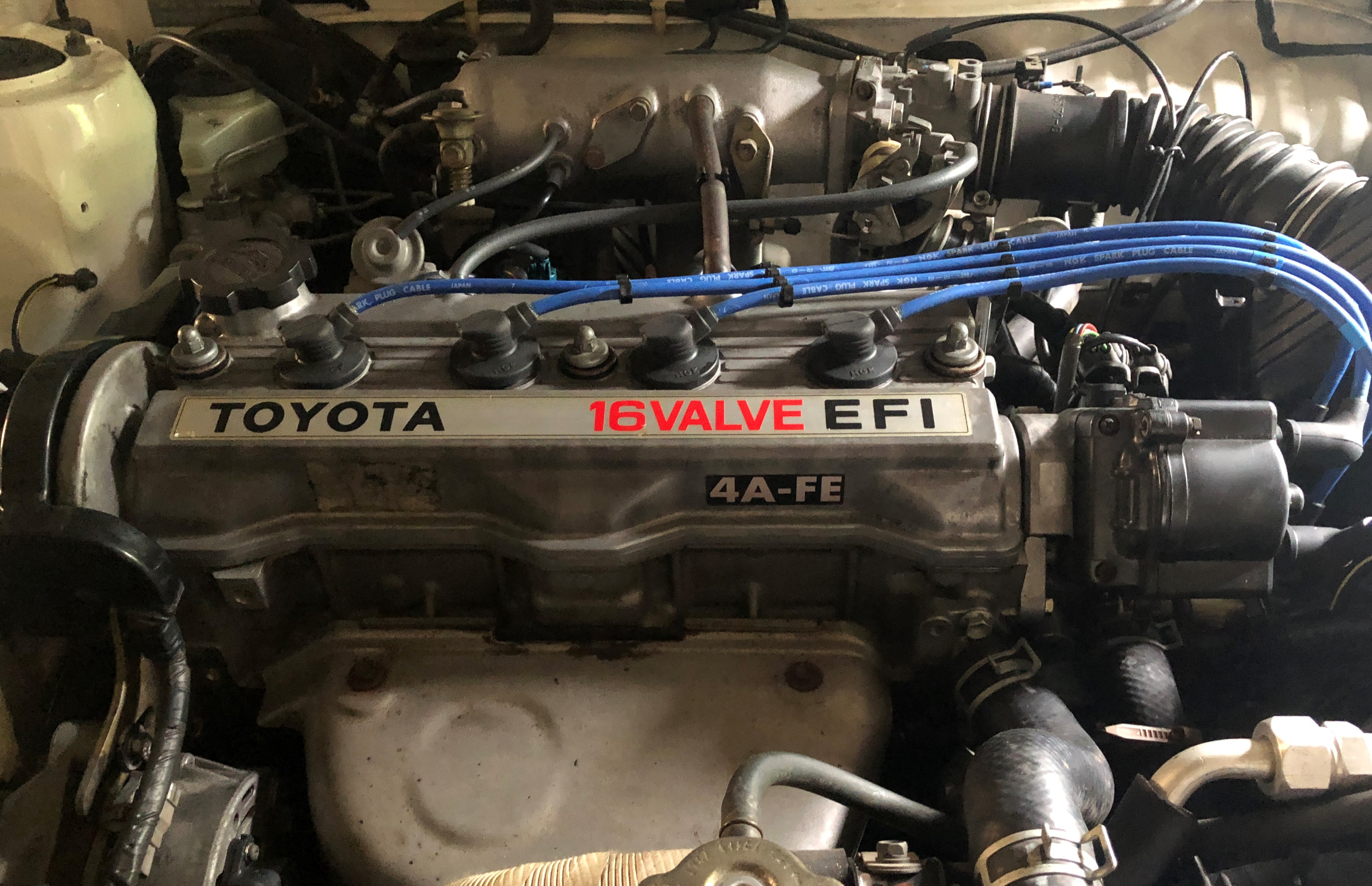
1st generation 4A-FE engine.

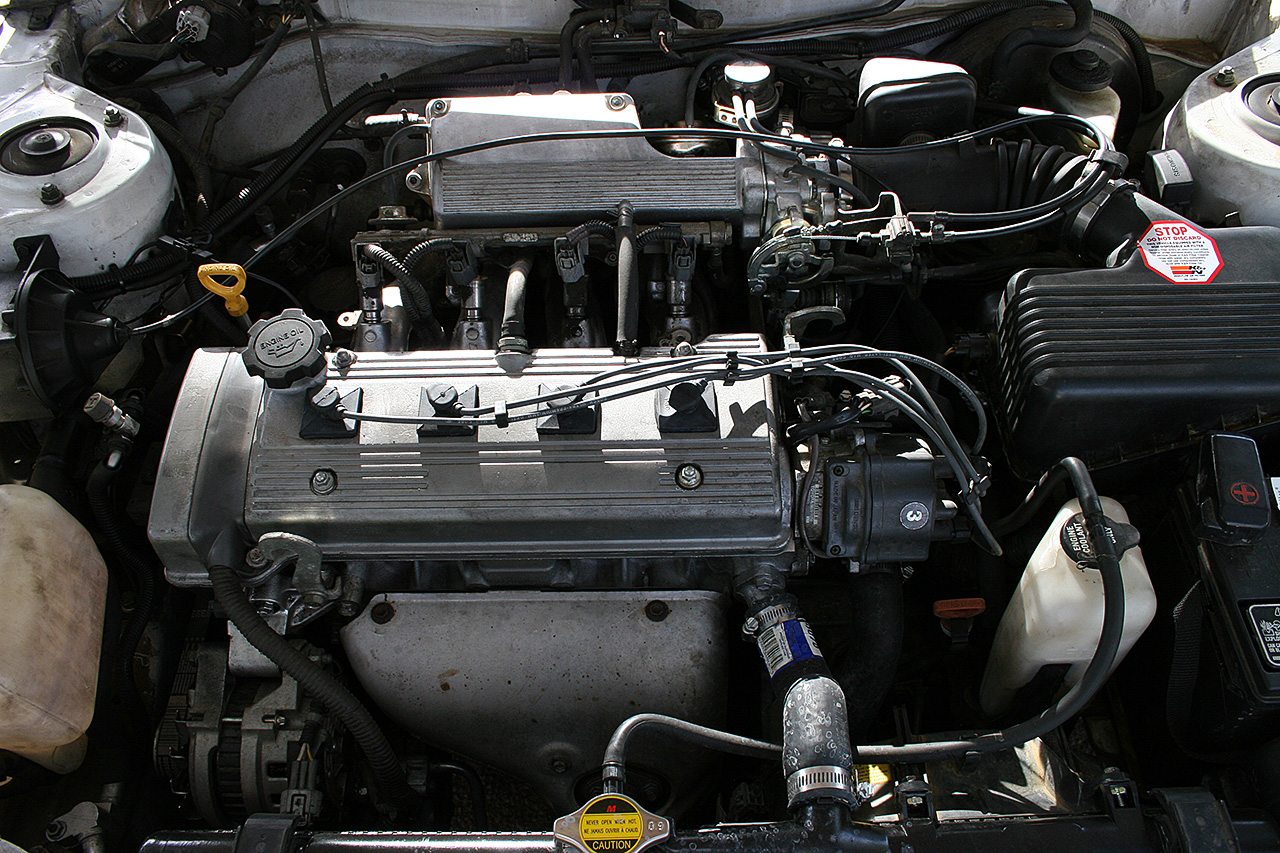
2nd generation 4A-FE engine.

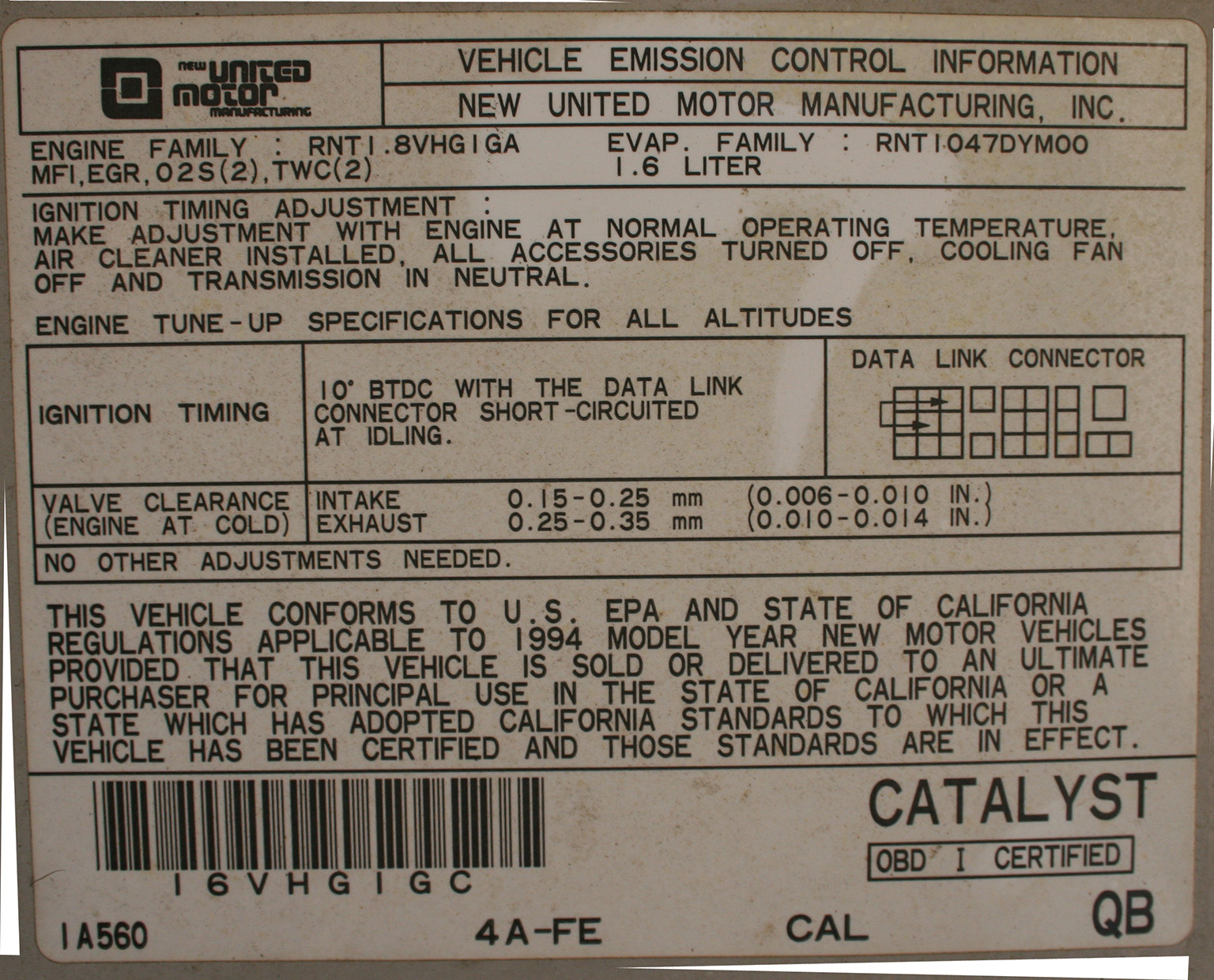
4A-FE engine sticker.

The fuel injected 4A-FE is the successor of the carbureted 4A-F, manufactured from 1987–2001. Toyota designed this engine with fuel economy in mind. The 4A-FE is basically the same as the 4A-F (introduced in the sixth generation of Corollas), the most apparent difference being the electronic fuel injection system as noted by the 'E'. The engine was succeeded by the 3ZZ-FE, a 1.6-liter engine with VVT-i technology.

There are three generations of this engine, which can be identified by the external shape of the engine. The first generation (1987–1996) featured a plate on the head which read "16 valve EFI" and fuel injectors in the head.

The second generation had a higher profile cam design in the head, a cam cover with ribs throughout its length, and fuel injectors in the intake manifold runners. Mechanically, the late-model engines received MAP load sensing and redesigned pistons, intake ports, and intake manifold. The second generation engine was produced from 1992–1998 (1993–1996 in the US).

The third generation (1996–2001) was released exclusively for the Asian market (Japan, Philippines, Pakistan, Thailand, Indonesia, and Malaysia) only. Although it is very similar to the second generation externally, it only has a slight difference in the top section of the intake manifold and throttle body. This last generation also has a higher additional output of 5 hp (4 kW) compared to the second generation.

- Engine displacement: 1.6 L (1,587 cc)
- Layout: DOHC Inline-4
- Valves: 16, 4 for each cylinder
- Redline: 6300 rpm
- Compression ratio: 9.5:1
- Fuel Delivery System: TCCS or MPFI

North American market engines:

- 76 kW (102 hp; 103 PS) at 5,800 rpm, and torque 145 N⋅m (107 lb⋅ft; 14.8 kg⋅m) at 4,800 rpm

European market engines:

- 105 PS (77 kW; 104 hp) at 6,000 rpm, and torque 142 N⋅m (105 lb⋅ft; 14.5 kg⋅m) at 3,200 rpm

Asian market engines:

- 115 PS (85 kW; 113 hp) at 6,000 rpm

Note: power and torque specs for North America and Europe are from the 1988–1992 Corollas.

The 4A-FE is different from the 4A-GE in terms of performance and power. Although both have the same displacement and are DOHC, they were optimized for different uses. The first obvious difference are the valves, the engine's intake and exhaust valves were placed 22.3° apart (compared to 50° in the G-Engines). The second is that it employed Toyota's High-Mecha Twin Cam system, where both camshafts are geared together with a singular timing belt driving the exhaust camshaft and the exhaust camshaft drives the inlet camshaft via scissor gears (both camshafts on the G-Engine are driven by the timing belts instead). Some of the less directly visible differences were compact combustion chamber designs with heavily shrouded valves, less aggressive camshaft profiles, a cast crankshaft (rather than a forged crankshaft in the 4A-GE), ports of a small cross sectional area, a very restrictive intake manifold with long runners joined to a small displacement plenum and other changes. Even though the valve angle is closer to what is considered in some racing circles to be ideal for power (approximately 25 degrees), its other design differences and the intake which is tuned for a primary harmonic resonance at low RPM means that it has about 10% less power compared to the 4A-GE engine. This engine design improves fuel efficiency and torque, but compromises power. Power ratings varied from 75–78 kW (100–105 hp) in the US market.

Applications

- AT220 Avensis 1997–2000 (excluding Japan)
- AT171/175 Carina 1988–1992 (Japan only)
- AT190 Carina 1984–1996 (Japan only)
- AT171 Carina II 1987–1992 (Europe only)
- AT190 Carina E 1992–1997 (Europe only)
- AT180 Celica 1989–1993 (excluding Japan)
- AE92/95 Corolla 1988–1997
- AE101/104/109 Corolla 1991–2002
- AE111/114 Corolla 1995–2002
- AE101 Corolla Ceres 1992–1998 (Japan only)
- AE111 Corolla Spacio 1997–2001 (Japan only)
- AT175 Corona 1988–1992 (Japan only)
- AT190 Corona 1992–1996
- AT210 Corona 1996–2001
- AE95 Sprinter 1989–1991 (Japan only)
- AE101/104/109 Sprinter 1992–2002 (Japan only)
- AE111/114 Sprinter 1995–1998 (Japan only)
- AE95 Sprinter Carib 1988–1990 (Japan only)
- AE111/114 Sprinter Carib 1996–2001 (Japan only)
- AE101 Sprinter Marino 1992–1998 (Japan only)
- AE92/AE111 Corolla/Conquest 1993–2002 (South Africa)
- Geo Prizm base model (based on Toyota AE92/AE101 chassis) 1989–1997

=== 4A-FHE ===
Same as the first generation 4A-FE, only more aggressive tune for more output. Called an EFI-S engine.

Output:

- 110 PS (81 kW; 108 hp) at 6,000 rpm and 14.5 kg⋅m (142 N⋅m; 105 lbf⋅ft) at 4,800 rpm (compression at 9.5:1)

Applications:

- AT171 Carina 1990–1992 (Japan only)
- AE95 Sprinter Carib 1990–1995 (Japan only)

=== 4A-GE (16-valve) ===
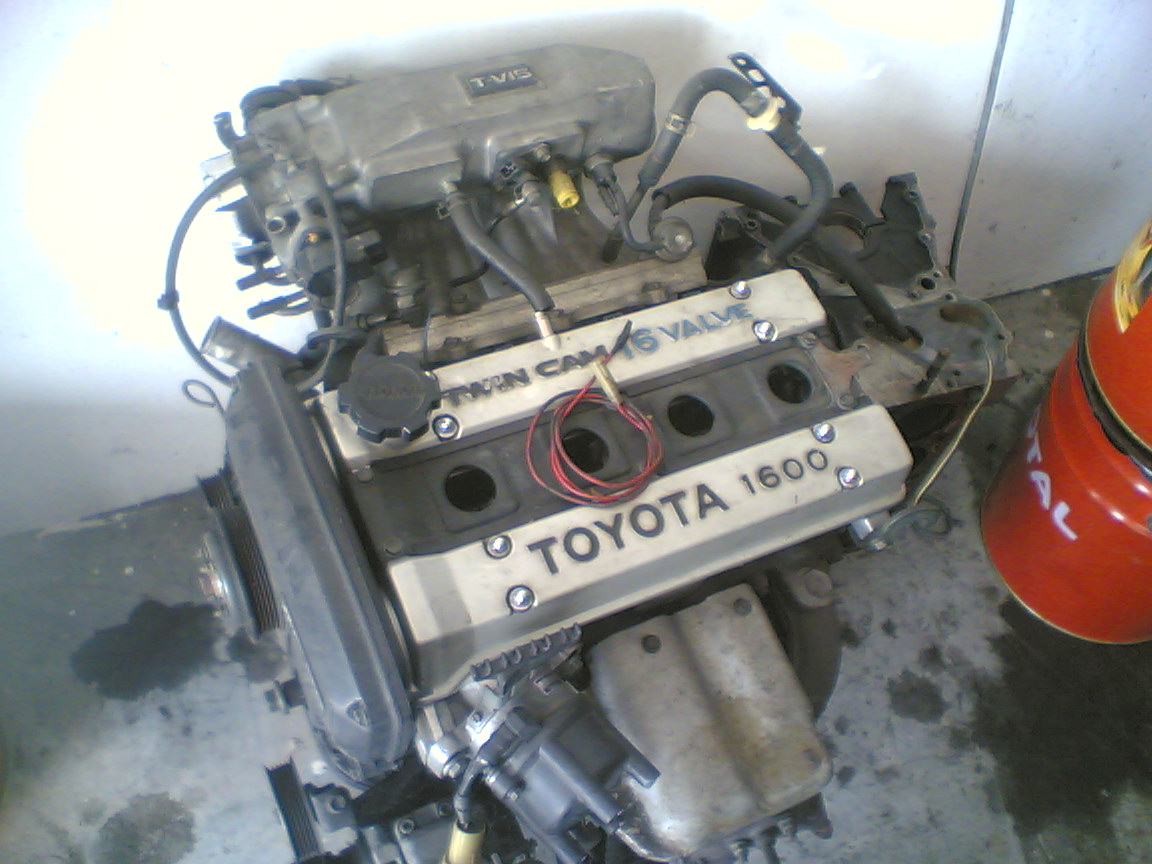
An early 4A-GE engine with the spark plug wires removed. The cam covers feature black-and-blue lettering and the 'T-VIS' acronym is present on the intake manifold plenum.

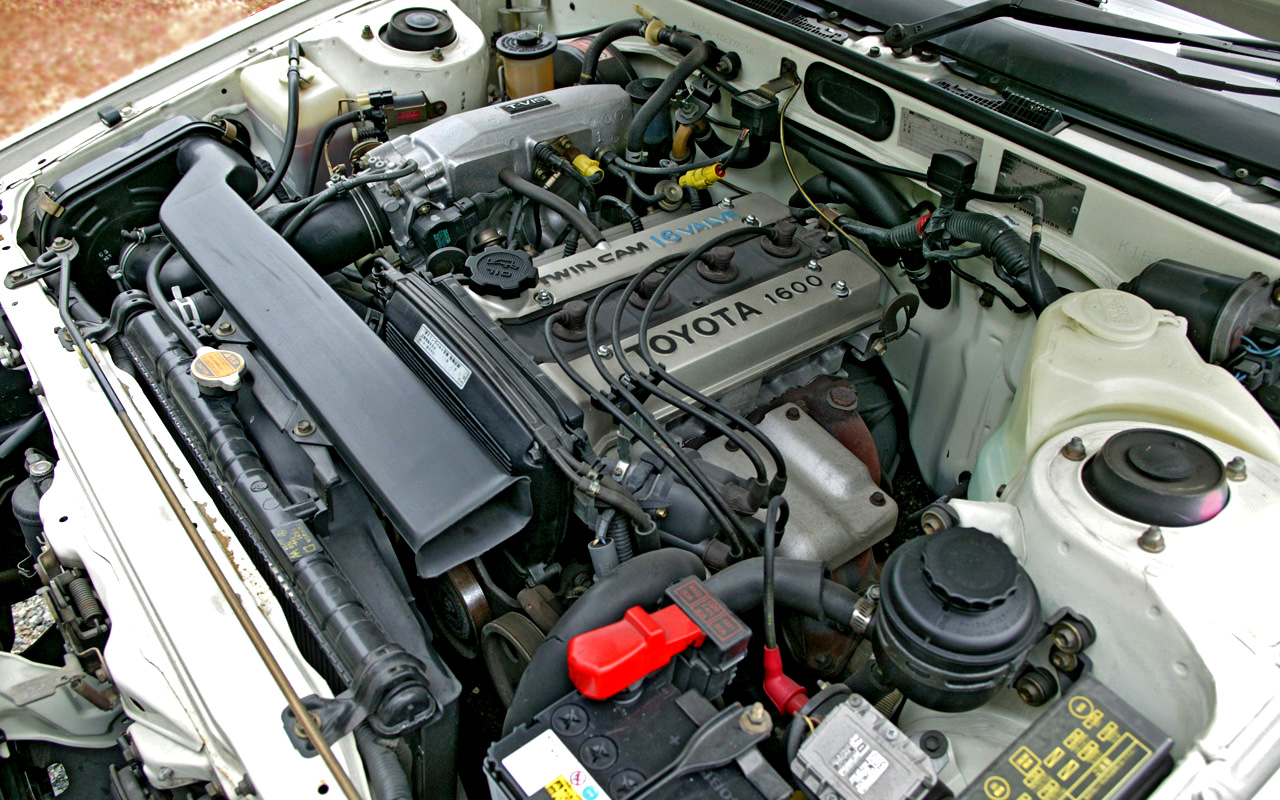
4A-GE with T-VIS

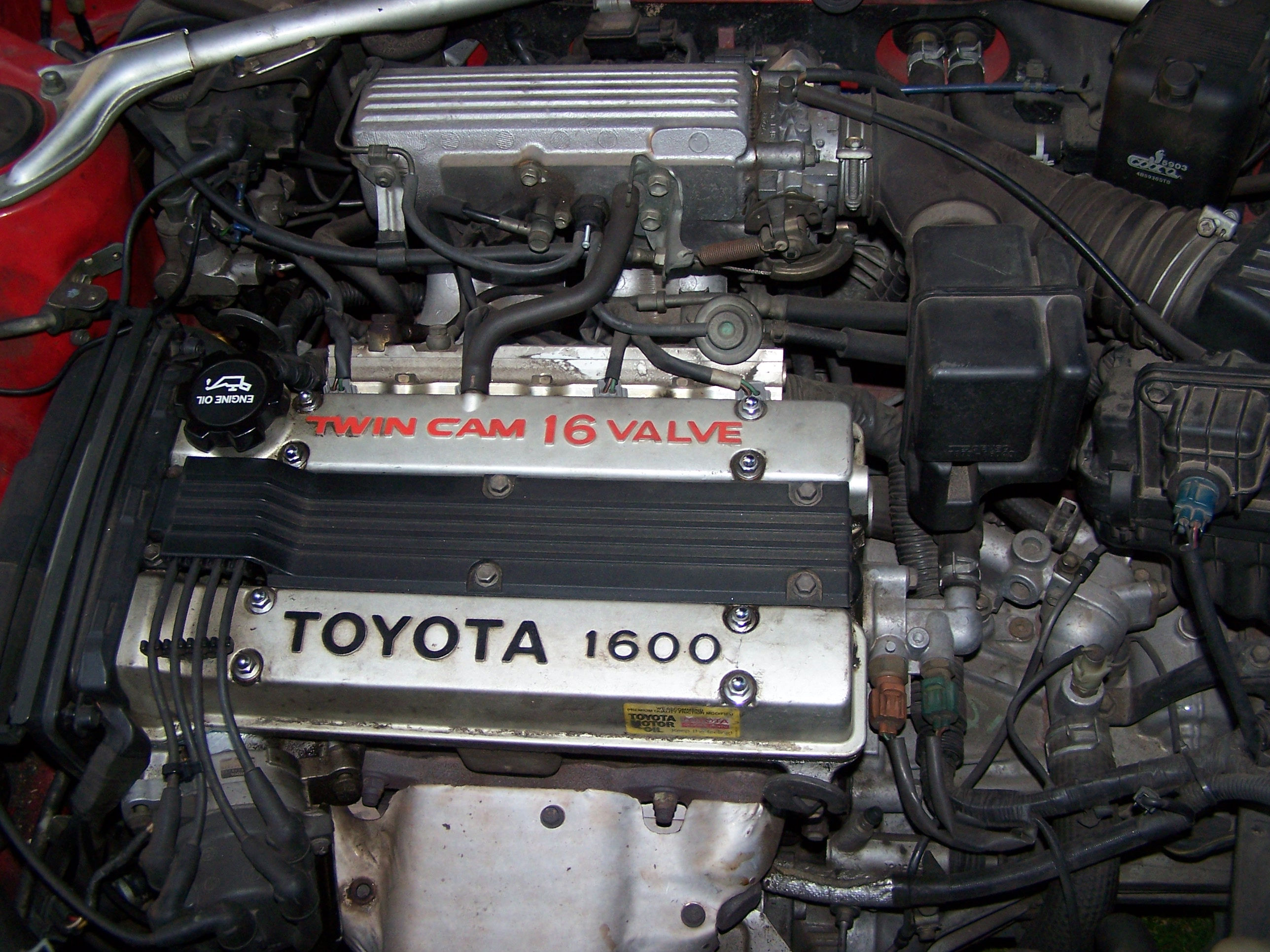
The most powerful of the 16-valve 4A-GE engines, commonly known as the "red top" (due to the red writing), which produces 140 PS (103 kW) at 6,600 rpm.

The 4A-GE was a series of high-performance four-cylinder twincam engines made by Toyota and was built at Toyota's Shimoyama plant alongside the 4A and 2A engines. The reliability and performance of these engines has earned them a fair number of enthusiasts and a fan base as they are a popular choice for an engine swap into other Toyota cars such as the KE70 and KP61. New performance parts are still available for sale even today because of its strong fan base. Production of the various models of this version lasted for five generations, from May 1983 through 1991 for the 16-valve versions and up to 2000 for the 20-valve 4A-GE versions.

==== First Generation "Blue Top" (Early Bigport) ====
The first-generation 4A-GE which was introduced in May 1983 replaced the 2T-G as Toyota's most popular twincam engine. This engine was called 4A-GEU ("U" for emission control) in Japan; 4A-GEC ("C" for California emission standard) for North American specifications; and the transverse version was named 4A-GEL/GELC/GELU. This engine was identifiable via silver cam covers with the lettering on the upper cover painted black and blue, as well as the presence of three reinforcement ribs on the back side of the block. It was extremely light and strong for a production engine using an all-iron block, weighing in at only 123 kg (271 lb) - over fifteen percent reduction compared to 2T-GEU. It was also 4 dB quieter. While originally conceived of as a two-valve design, Toyota changed the 4A-GE to a four-valve after a year of evaluation.

The 4A-GEC produced 112 hp (84 kW; 114 PS) in the American market. The use of a vane-type air flow meter (AFM), which restricted air flow slightly but produced cleaner emissions that conformed to the U.S. regulations, limited the power considerably - the 4A-GEU Japanese model, which uses a manifold absolute pressure (MAP) sensor, was rated at 130 PS (96 kW; 128 hp) in gross rating. Nonetheless, Japanese cars tested no faster than their American counterparts despite their higher power rating and a lower curb weight. In addition to North America, the 4A-GEC engine was also offered in Sweden, Switzerland and West Germany. In Sweden and Switzerland, the engine was rated higher at 120 PS (88 kW; 118 hp), while the version destined for West Germany was rated at 116 PS (85 kW; 114 hp). Both were rated in DIN net and the power differences were mainly due to the different exhaust systems. Another version of this engine was the standard 4A-GE similar to the Japanese version, but without a catalytic converter. The European version has a compression ratio of 10.0:1 instead of 9.4:1 for the rest of the world, and was rated at 124 PS (91 kW; 122 hp).

Toyota designed the engine for performance; the valve angle was a relatively wide 50 degrees, which at the time was believed to be ideal for high power production.

The first-generation 4A-GE is nicknamed the "bigport" engine because it had intake ports of a very large cross-sectional area. While the port cross-section was suitable for a very highly modified engine at very high engine speeds, it caused a considerable drop in low-end torque due to the decreased air speeds at those rpm. To compensate for the reduced air speed, the first-generation engines included the T-VIS feature, in which dual intake runners are fitted with butterfly valves that opened at approximately 4,200 rpm. The effect is that at lower rpm (when the airspeed would normally be slow) four of the eight runners are closed, which forces the engine to draw in all its air through half the runners in the manifold. This not only raises the airspeed which causes better cylinder filling, but due to the asymmetrical airflow a swirl is created in the combustion chamber, meaning better fuel atomization. This enabled the torque curve to still be intact at lower engine speeds, allowing for better performance across the entire speed band and a broad, flat torque curve around the crossover point. During rising engine speed, a slight lurch can occur at the crossover point and an experienced driver will be able to detect the shift in performance. Production of the first-generation engine model lasted until May 1987.

==== Second Generation "Red & Black Top" (Late Bigport) ====
The second-generation 4A-GE produced from June 1987 to May 1989 featured larger diameter bearings for the connecting-rod big ends 42 mm (1.65 in) and added four additional reinforcement ribs on the back of the engine block, for a total of seven. The T-VIS feature is retained, as well as the MAP sensor (MAF sensor in the US-market). It is visually similar to the first-generation engine (only the upper cam cover now featured red and black lettering) and the US-market power output was only increased to 115 hp (117 PS; 86 kW). The Japanese market was rated at 120 PS (118 hp; 88 kW), this time in net rating. The first- and second-generation engines are very popular with racers and tuners because of their availability, ease of modification, simple design, and lightness.

==== Third Generation "Red Top" (Smallport) ====
The third-generation appeared in June 1989 and was in production until June 1991. This engine has the silver cam covers with the words only written in red, hence the nickname "red top". Toyota increased the compression ratio from 9.4:1 to 10.3:1. To correct the air-speed problems of the earlier generations, the intake ports in this cylinder head were re-designed to have a smaller cross-section, and hence it has been nicknamed the "smallport" head. This change in the intake ports negated the need for the earlier twin-runner intake manifold and it was replaced with a single-runner manifold. Additional engine modifications to extend life and reliability included under-piston cooling oil squirters, thicker connecting rods and other components. Also of note, the pistons were changed to utilize a 20 mm (0.79 in) fully floating gudgeon pin unlike the 18 mm (0.71 in) pressed-in pins of the earlier versions. Other internal revisions were made to the pistons. They were slightly modified to make space for the under-piston cooling oil squirters found in this engine version. In addition to this, the piston ring size were changed to 1.2 mm (0.047 in) (top ring), 1.5mm (second ring) and 2.8 mm (0.11 in) (oil ring), this change in size made it difficult to obtain as compared to the earlier 16 valves versions of the 4A-GE 1.5 mm (0.059 in) (top ring), 1.5 mm (0.059 in) (second ring), 3 mm (0.12 in) (oil ring). All non-US market 4A-GEs continued to use a MAP sensor, while all of the North American market 4A-GE engines came with a MAF sensor. For North American market cars, this revision increased the power to 132 PS (97 kW; 130 hp). In non-NA market cars, this revision produced 130–140 PS (96–103 kW; 128–138 hp), depending on the market.

The 4A-GE engine was first introduced in the 1983 Sprinter Trueno AE86 and the Corolla Levin AE86. The AE86 marked the end of the 4A-GE as a rear wheel drive (RWD or FR) mounted engine. Alongside the RWD AE86/AE85 coupes, a front wheel drive (FWD or FF) Corolla was produced and all future Corollas/Sprinters were based around the FF layout. The AW11 MR2 continued use of the engine as a rear mid-engine, rear-wheel-drive layout, transversely-mounted midship. The engine was retired from North American Corollas in 1991, although it continued to be available in the Geo Prizm GSi (sold through Chevrolet dealerships) from 1990 to 1992. All 4A-GE engines (including the 20-valve versions below) feature a forged crankshaft rather than a cheaper and more commonly used cast version.

Clarification: In the U.S. market, the 4A-GE engine was first used in the 1985 model year Corolla GT-S only, which is identified as an "AE88" in the VIN but uses the AE86 chassis code on the firewall as the AE88 is a "sub" version of the AE86. The 4A-GE engines for the 1985 model year are referred to as "blue top" as opposed to the later "red top" engines, because the paint color on the valve covers is different, to show the different engine revision, using different port sizes, different airflow metering, and other minor differences on the engine.

The American Spec AE86 (VIN AE88, or GT-S) carried the 4A-GE engine. In other markets, other designations were used. Much confusion exists, even among dealers, as to which models contained what equipment, especially since Toyota split the Corolla line into both RWD and FWD versions, and the GT-S designation was only well known as a Celica version at that time.

Applications

- AA63 Carina 1983.06–1985 (Japan only)
- AT160 Carina 1985–1988 (Japan only)
- AT171 Carina 1988–1992 (Japan only)
- AA63 Celica 1983–1985
- AT160 Celica 1985–1989
- AE82 Corolla 1984.10–1987
- AE86 Corolla Levin/Sprinter Trueno 1983.05–1987
- AE92 Corolla 1987–1993
- AT141 Corona 1983.10–1985 (Japan only)
- AT160 Corona 1985–1988 (Japan only)
- AW11 MR2 1984.06–1989
- AE82 Sprinter 1984.10–1987 (Japan only)
- AE92 Sprinter 1987–1992 (Japan only)
- Chevrolet Nova Twin Cam (based on Sprinter AE82 chassis) 1988
- Geo Prizm GSi (based on Sprinter AE92 chassis) 1990–1992

4A-GE (16-valve) specifications
	Gen 1 "Blue Top" (Early Bigport)	Gen 2 "Red & Black Top" (Late Bigport)	Gen 3 "Red Top" (Smallport)
Production	May 1983–May 1987	June 1987–May 1989	June 1989–June 1991
Layout	DOHC Straight-4 (Inline-4)		
Capacity	1,587 cc (1.6 L; 96.8 cu in)		
Bore × Stroke	81.0 mm × 77.0 mm (3.19 in × 3.03 in)		
Valves	16 valves, 4 per each cylinder		
Ignition	Distributor		
Fuel Delivery System	MPFI		
Fuel Metering	Manifold Absolute Pressure (MAP); Air Flow Meter (AFM) (North America, Sweden, Switzerland and West Germany)		
Fuel Requirements	Regular / Premium Switch Selectable (US: 87–91 AKI; Japan: 90–100 RON)		
Maximum Redline	7,600 rpm		
Dry Weight	123 kg (271 lb) (early version)		
Horsepower	130 PS (96 kW; 128 hp) at 6,600 rpm (Japan; gross rating); 124 PS (91 kW; 122 hp) at 6,600 rpm (Europe); 120 PS (88 kW; 118 hp) at 6,600 rpm (Sweden and Switzerland); 116 PS (85 kW; 114 hp) at 6,600 rpm (West Germany); 114 PS (84 kW; 112 hp) at 6,600 rpm (North America)	125 PS (92 kW; 123 hp) at 6,600 rpm (Europe); 120 PS (88 kW; 118 hp) at 6,600 rpm (Japan); 117 PS (86 kW; 115 hp) at 6,400 rpm (North America)	140 PS (103 kW; 138 hp) at 7,200 rpm (Japan and general export); 132 PS (97 kW; 130 hp) at 6,800 rpm (North America); 130 PS (96 kW; 128 hp) at 7,000 rpm (Europe)
Torque	149 N⋅m (110 lb⋅ft; 15 kg⋅m) at 5,200 rpm (Japan; gross rating); 142 N⋅m (105 lb⋅ft; 14 kg⋅m) at 5,200 rpm (Europe); 140 N⋅m (103 lb⋅ft; 14 kg⋅m) at 5,200 rpm (Sweden and Switzerland); 135 N⋅m (100 lb⋅ft; 14 kg⋅m) at 4,800 rpm (North America)	145 N⋅m (107 lb⋅ft; 15 kg⋅m) at 5,000 rpm (Europe); 142 N⋅m (105 lb⋅ft; 14 kg⋅m) at 5,200 rpm (Japan); 142 N⋅m (105 lb⋅ft; 14 kg⋅m) at 6,000 rpm (Europe); 131 N⋅m (97 lb⋅ft; 13 kg⋅m) at 6,800 rpm (North America)	147 N⋅m (108 lb⋅ft; 15 kg⋅m) at 6,000 rpm (Japan and general export); 142 N⋅m (105 lb⋅ft; 14 kg⋅m) at 6,000 rpm (North America and Europe)
Compression Ratio	9.4:1; 10.0:1 (Europe)		10.3:1
Variable Intake System	T-VIS		None
Intake Valve Diameter	29.5 mm (1.16 in)		
Exhaust Valve Diameter	25.5 mm (1.00 in)		
Intake Valve Lift	7.1 mm (0.28 in)		
Exhaust Valve Lift	7.1 mm (0.28 in)		
Injector Size	Top-Feed 365 cc		
Piston Cooling	No		

=== 4A-GE (20-valve) ===
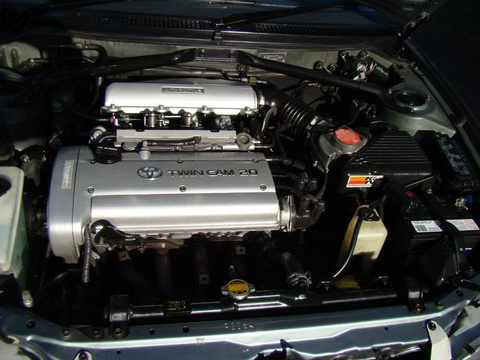
Silver Top 20-Valve 4A-GE

==== Fourth Generation "Silver Top" ====
The fourth-generation 4A-GE engine was produced from 1991 to 1995. It has silver cam covers with chrome lettering, hence the nickname "silver top". This engine yet again features a completely new cylinder head which uses five valves per cylinder instead of four. It uses Toyota's Variable Valve Timing (VVT) system on the intake cam, an increased compression ratio (10.5:1), and the intake system was replaced with a short manifold with individual throttles and velocity stacks, however the vane-type airflow meter was retained, requiring the use of a plenum. The previous 16-valve head used a sharply curved intake port, while the 20-valve engine used a very upright straight port. This engine produces 160 PS (118 kW; 158 hp) at 7,400 rpm with 16.5 kg⋅m (162 N⋅m; 119 lbf⋅ft) of torque at 5,200 rpm.

In South Africa, the 7A-FE engine was used in place of the 20-valve 4A-GE engine in 1993 despite other countries (except North America) moving towards the new engine, as South African fuel was not suitable at the time for the 20-valve 4A-GE engines. The 20-valve 4A-GE engine would eventually arrive in the Corolla RXi and RSi in the "black top" revision in 1997.

Applications:

- AE101 Corolla Levin coupe 1991–1995 (Japan only)
- AE101 Sprinter Trueno coupe 1991–1995 (Japan only)
- AE101 Corolla Ceres hardtop 1992–1995 (Japan only)
- AE101 Sprinter Marino hardtop 1992–1995 (Japan only)
- AT210 Carina 1996–2001 (Japan only)
- AE101 Corolla 1991–2000 (Japan only)
- AE101 Sprinter 1991–2000 (Japan only)

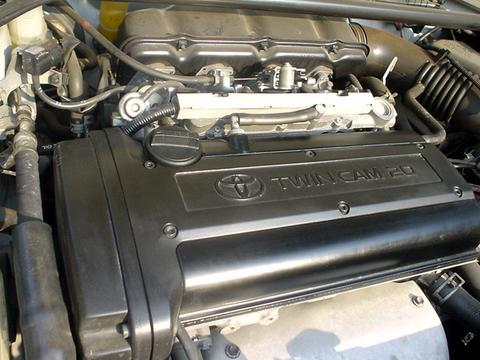
Black Top 20-Valve 4A-GELU

==== Fifth Generation "Black Top" ====
The fifth-generation 4A-GE engine produced from 1995 to 2000 is the final version of the 4A-GE engine and has black cam covers. It uses Toyota Variable Valve Timing (VVT) system on the intake cam. This engine is commonly known as the "black top" due to the color of the valve cover, and yet again features an even higher compression ratio (11:1). The air flow sensor was replaced by a MAP sensor, the diameter of the four individual throttle bodies was increased from 43 to 45 mm (1.69 to 1.77 in), the exhaust ports diameter were increased by 3 mm, the intake cam lift was increased from 7.9 to 8.2 mm (0.31 to 0.32 in), and the intake ports were significantly improved in shape and contour, with the width of the opening at the head increased as well. Additionally, the black top had a lighter flywheel, a larger plenum, lighter connecting rods and revised rubber velocity stacks, and was also offered in 1997 with a six-speed C160 transaxle. This revision increased the power to 165 PS (121 kW; 163 hp) at 7,800 rpm with 16.5 kg⋅m (162 N⋅m; 119 lbf⋅ft) of torque at 5,600 rpm. The 'Blacktop' has become a favorite among enthusiasts and is used as an easy power upgrade for the early Toyota Corolla models, especially for use in the drift scene. Due to the relatively high state of tuning of the stock engine, most power/torque gains come from higher lift cams and engine management.

Some people have said that the power figures of the 20-valve engines from Toyota are inflated; this statement was likely caused by using less than 100 RON fuel (Japanese premium fuel standard; roughly equivalent to 94 AKI or (R+M)/2 fuel) that both 20-valve engines require.

Applications

- AE111 Corolla Levin coupe 1995–2000 (Japan only)
- AE111 Sprinter Trueno coupe 1995–2000 (Japan only)
- AE101 Corolla Ceres hardtop 1995–1998 (Japan only)
- AE101 Sprinter Marino hardtop 1995–1998 (Japan only)
- AE101G Corolla BZ touring wagon 1995–1999 (Japan)
- AE111 Corolla 1995–2000 (Japan only)
- AE111 Sprinter 1995–1999 (Japan only)
- AE111 Sprinter Carib 1997–2000 (Japan only)
- AE111 Corolla RSi and RXi 1997–2002 (South Africa)
- AT210 Carina 1996-2001 (Japan only)

4A-GE (20-valve) specifications
	Gen 4 "Silver Top"	Gen 5 "Black Top"
Production	June 1991–May 1995	May 1995–August 2000
Layout	DOHC Straight-4 (Inline-4)	
Capacity	1,587 cc (1.6 L; 96.8 cu in)	
Bore × Stroke	81.0 mm × 77.0 mm (3.19 in × 3.03 in)	
Valves	20 valves, 5 per each cylinder	
Ignition	Distributor	
Fuel Delivery System	MPFI	
Fuel Metering	Air Flow Meter (AFM)	Manifold Absolute Pressure (MAP)
Fuel Requirements	100 RON Premium (94 AKI or (R+M)/2)	
Maximum Rev Limit	7,800 rpm	8,200 rpm (Auto + 5spd) / 8,400 rpm (6spd)
Horsepower	160 PS (118 kW; 158 hp) at 7,400 rpm	165 PS (121 kW; 163 hp) at 7,800 rpm
Torque	16.5 kg⋅m (162 N⋅m; 119 lbf⋅ft) at 5,200 rpm	16.5 kg⋅m (162 N⋅m; 119 lbf⋅ft) at 5,600 rpm
Compression Ratio	10.5:1	11.0:1
Variable Valve Timing	Toyota VVT (intake cam)	
Intake Valve Diameter	43 mm (1.7 in)	45 mm (1.8 in)
Exhaust Valve Diameter	7.1 mm (0.28 in)	7.4 mm (0.29 in)
Intake Valve Lift	7.9 mm (0.31 in)	8.2 mm (0.32 in)
Exhaust Valve Lift	7.1 mm (0.28 in)	7.4 mm (0.29 in)
Injector Size	Side-Feed 365 cc	
Piston Cooling	No	

=== 4A-GZE ===
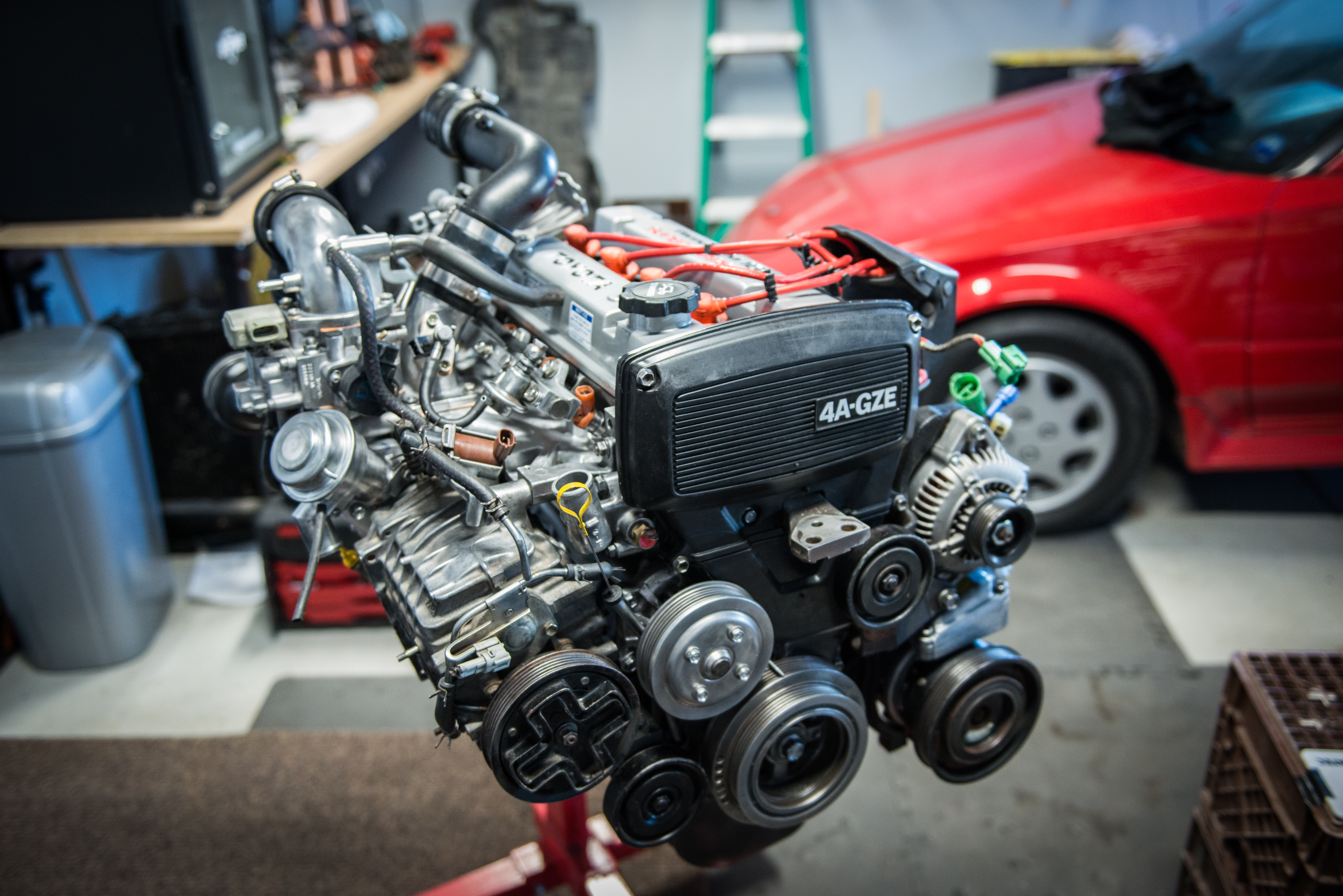
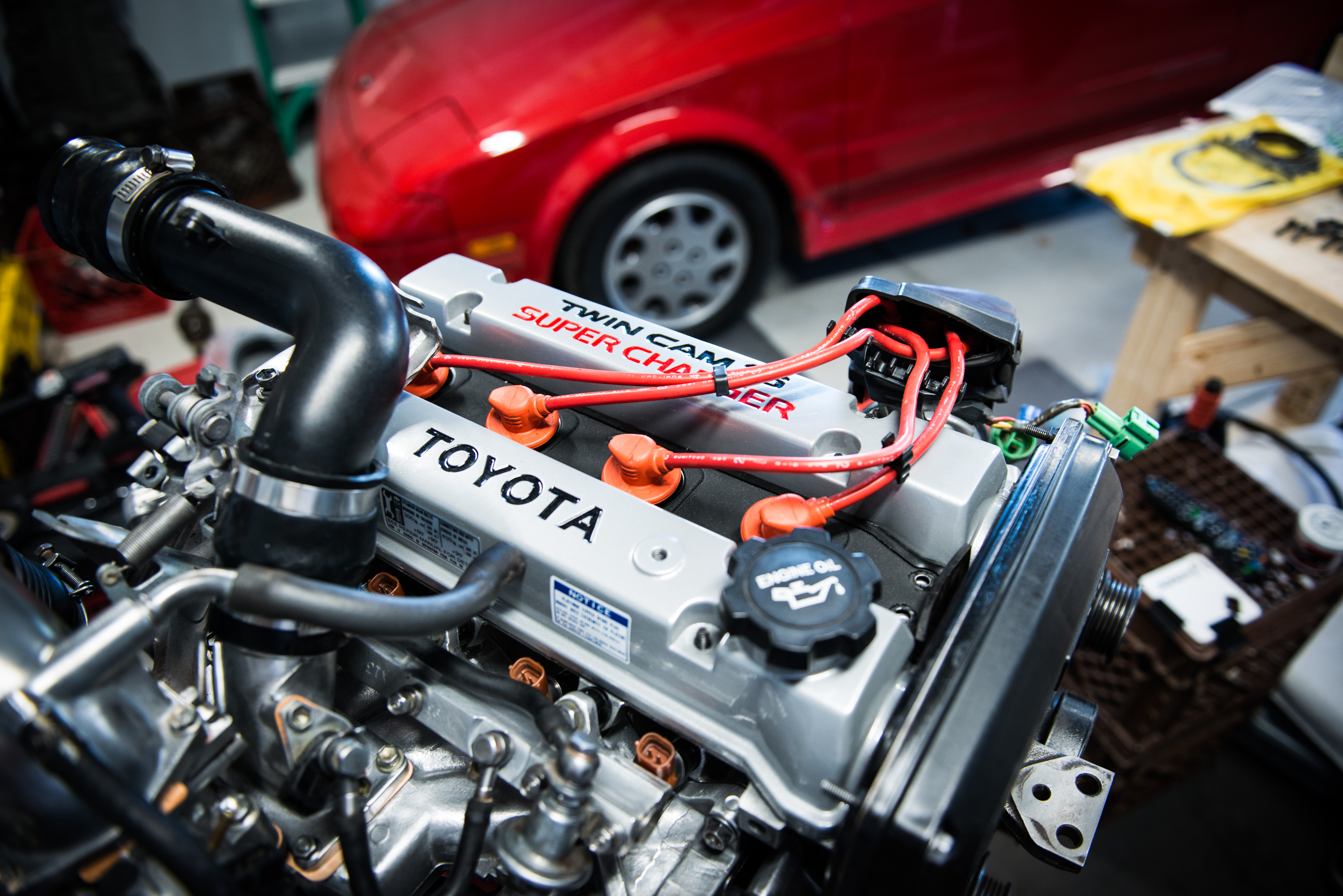
The 1st generation 4A-GZE used in the Toyota MR2 Supercharged. Note the roots type supercharger on the intake side in the first image. The 4A-GZE, 1G-GZE and 2TZ-FZE are the only factory supercharged engines manufactured by Toyota.

The 4A-GZE was a supercharged version of the 4A-GE produced in various forms from August 1986 through 1995. All three generations shared forged and ceramic coated pistons, a SC12 Roots type supercharger, and a stronger 7-rib block and crankshaft, similar to the 1987–1989 "Late Bigport" second-generation 4A-GE. Toyota Racing Development also developed supercharger kits for the 4A-GZE engines.

The 4A-GZE is popular for turbo conversions, as many parts do not need to be modified to support the extra boost.

==== First Generation ====
The first-generation 4A-GZE produced 8 psi (0.55 bar) peak manifold pressure. It used dished, forged and coated pistons with an 8.0:1 compression ratio. Compared to the 4A-GE, the main differences for the long block were casting holes for a knock sensor and coolant bypass pipes, lower duration cam timing (232º), the upgraded pistons, different valve covers, and the omission of T-VIS. The first-generation 4A-GZE was rated at 145 PS (107 kW; 143 hp) at 6400 rpm and 19.4 kg⋅m (190 N⋅m; 140 lbf⋅ft) at 4400 rpm.

The 4A-GZE was first used in the 1986 supercharged Toyota MR2 AW11 until May 1989. It was also used in the 1987–1989 Toyota Corolla AE92 and Sprinter AE92 (Japan-only). Despite having the same specifications, the MR2 was equipped with a distributor and a single ignition coil while the Corolla and Sprinter was equipped with a distributor-less design and twin coil packs.

Applications:

- AW11 MR2 1986–1989 (Japan, 1988–1989 North America)
- AE92 Corolla 1987–1989 (Japan only)
- AE92 Sprinter 1987–1989 (Japan only)

==== Second Generation ====
In late 1989, the 4A-GZE was updated with an 8.9:1 compression, and MAP D-Jetronic load sensing and a smaller supercharger pulley producing 10 psi (0.69 bar). These updated 4A-GZE engines were rated at 165 PS (121 kW; 163 hp) and 21.2 kg⋅m (208 N⋅m; 153 lbf⋅ft). Fuel requirements were increased from this generation onwards, requiring at least 100 RON fuel. It can be denoted by a gray cover on the top-mounted intercooler with an emblem reading "Twin Cam 16 Supercharger". While this cover was also used on early AE92s with the first-generation 4A-GZE, the lack of AFM and its subsequent replacement with MAP in the later AE92s makes this generation easily recognizable.

Applications:

- AE92 Corolla 1989–1991 (Japan only)
- AE92 Sprinter 1989–1991 (Japan only)

==== Third Generation ====
In mid 1991, the 4A-GZE was further upgraded with the "smallport" cylinder head and the block was equipped with piston skirt oil jets for cooling. These minimal updates further increased output to 170 PS (125 kW; 168 hp) and 21.2 kg⋅m (208 N⋅m; 153 lbf⋅ft). It can be denoted by a black cover on the top-mounted intercooler with an emblem featuring Toyota's then-new logo followed by the word "Supercharger". While its naturally aspirated counterpart (4A-GE) used five valves per cylinder for a total of 20 valves in its redesigned cylinder head during this timeframe, the 4A-GZE's cylinder head remained unchanged and continued to use four valves per cylinder for a total of 16 valves.

Applications:

- AE101 Corolla 1991–1995 (Japan only)
- AE101 Sprinter 1991–1995 (Japan only)

4A-GZE Specifications
	Gen 1	Gen 2	Gen 3
Production	June 1985–May 1989	May 1989–June 1991	June 1991–May 1995
Layout	DOHC Straight-4 (Inline-4)		
Capacity	1,587 cc (1.6 L; 96.8 cu in)		
Bore × Stroke	81.0 mm × 77.0 mm (3.19 in × 3.03 in)		
Valves	16 valves, 4 per each cylinder		
Ignition	Distributor (AW11), DLI (AE92)	DLI	
Fuel Delivery System	MPFI		
Fuel Metering	Air Flow Meter (AFM)	Manifold Absolute Pressure (MAP)	
Fuel Requirements	Regular / Premium Switch Selectable (US: 87–91 AKI; Japan: 90–100 RON)	100 RON Premium (94 AKI or (R+M)/2)	
Maximum Redline	7,600 rpm		
Horsepower	145 PS (107 kW; 143 hp) at 6400rpm	165 PS (121 kW; 163 hp) at 6400rpm	170 PS (125 kW; 168 hp) at 6400rpm
Torque	19.4 kg⋅m (190 N⋅m; 140 lbf⋅ft) at 4400rpm	21.2 kg⋅m (208 N⋅m; 153 lbf⋅ft) at 4400rpm	
Compression Ratio	8.0:1	8.9:1	8.9:1
Variable Intake System	None		
Intake Valve Diameter	29.5 mm (1.16 in)		
Exhaust Valve Diameter	25.5 mm (1.00 in)		
Intake Valve Lift	7.1 mm (0.28 in)		
Exhaust Valve Lift	7.1 mm (0.28 in)		
Injector Size	Top-Feed 365 cc		
Supercharger	SC12		
Factory Boost	7–8 psi (0.48–0.55 bar)	9–10 psi (0.62–0.69 bar)	
Piston Cooling	No		Oil Jets

=== Racing Applications ===
Due to its durability, performance and relatively low cost, 4A-GE and 4A-GZE engines and their derivatives have been popular for both professional and amateur racing since their introduction. The most notable application of the 4A-GE in racing was as in the Formula Atlantic series, where in full race trim the engine will produce 250 PS (184 kW; 247 hp) at 10,000 rpm.

== 5A ==
5A
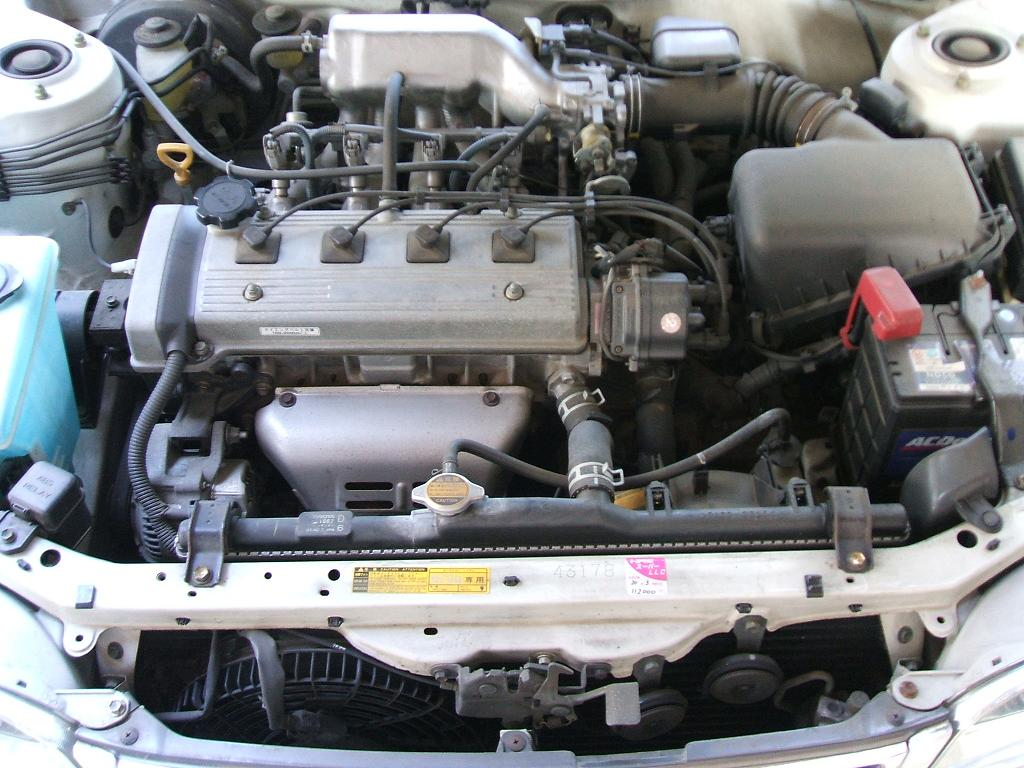
- 5A-FE engine

Overview
- Manufacturer: Toyota
- Production: 1987–2006

Layout
- Configuration: Inline 4
- Displacement: 1,498 cc (1.5 L)
- Cylinder bore: 78.7 mm (3.10 in)
- Piston stroke: 77 mm (3.03 in)
- Cylinder block material: Cast iron
- Cylinder head material: Aluminum
- Valvetrain: DOHC 4 valves x cyl.

Combustion
- Fuel system: Carburetor, Fuel injection
- Fuel type: Gasoline
- Cooling system: Water cooled

Output
- Power output: 85 PS (63 kW; 84 hp); 100 PS (74 kW; 99 hp); 105 PS (77 kW; 104 hp); 120 PS (88 kW; 118 hp)
- Torque output: 12.4 kg⋅m (122 N⋅m; 90 lbf⋅ft); 13.3 kg⋅m (130 N⋅m; 96 lbf⋅ft); 13.4 kg⋅m (131 N⋅m; 97 lbf⋅ft); 14.1 kg⋅m (138 N⋅m; 102 lbf⋅ft)

Chronology
- Predecessor: 3A
- Successor: 1NZ

The 1.5 L (1,498 cc) 5A was produced from 1987 through 2006. The carbureted 5A-F was produced in 1987 and the fuel injected 5A-FE was produced that year and again from 1995 through 1998. Both used a cylinder bore and stroke of 78.7 mm × 77 mm (3.10 in × 3.03 in) and had 4 valves per cylinder with DOHC heads using the narrow-valve (22.3°) angle. It uses the same High-Mecha Twin Cam system from the 4A-F and 4A-FE.

=== 5A-F ===
Output for the carb version was 85 PS (63 kW; 84 hp) at 6000 rpm and 12.4 kg⋅m (122 N⋅m; 90 lbf⋅ft) at 3600 rpm.

Applications:

- AT170 Carina 1988–1990 (Japan only)
- AE91 Corolla 1987–1989 (Japan only)
- AT170 Corona 1987–1989 (Japan only)
- AE91 Sprinter 1987–1989 (Japan only)

=== 5A-FE ===
Output for the 1987 FI version was 105 PS (77 kW; 104 hp) at 6000 rpm and 131 N⋅m (13.4 kg⋅m; 97 lb⋅ft) at 4800 rpm. A later one produced 100 PS (74 kW; 99 hp) at 5600 rpm and 138 N⋅m (14.1 kg⋅m; 102 lb⋅ft) at 4400 rpm.

Toyota joint venture partner Tianjin FAW Xiali produces the 5A-FE (dubbed 5A+) for its Vela and Weizhi (C1) subcompact sedans. This version produces 100 PS (74 kW; 99 hp) at 6000 rpm and 130 N⋅m (13.3 kg⋅m; 96 lb⋅ft) at 4400 rpm.

Applications

- AT170 Carina 1990–1992 (Japan only)
- AT192 Carina 1992–1996 (Japan only)
- AT212 Carina 1996–2001 (Japan only)
- AE91 Corolla 1989–1992 (Japan only)
- AE100 Corolla 1991–2001 (Japan only)
- AE110 Corolla 1995–2000 (Japan only)
- AE100 Corolla Ceres 1992–1998 (Japan only)
- AT170 Corona 1989–1992 (Japan only)
- AL50 Soluna 1996–2003 (Asia)
- AE91 Sprinter 1989–1992 (Japan only)
- AE100 Sprinter 1991–1995 (Japan only)
- AE110 Sprinter 1995–2000(Japan only)
- AE100 Sprinter Marino 1992–1998 (Japan only)
- AXP42 Vios 2002–2006 (China only)
- Yema SQJ6451
- Xiali Vela (China)
- Xiali Weizhi (China)
- Geely CK (China)
- Geely MK (China)

=== 5A-FHE ===
Same as the first generation 5A-FE, only more aggressive tune for more output. This engine produces up to 120 PS (88 kW; 118 hp) due to slightly larger throttle than the standard 5A-FE and different cam profiles. Called an EFI-S engine.

Applications:

- AE91 Corolla 1989–1992 (Japan only)
- AE91 Sprinter 1989–1992 (Japan only)
- AE91 Toyota G Touring 1994–1999 (Japan only)
- AE100 Toyota G Touring 1994–1999 (Japan only)

== 6A ==
6A

Overview
- Manufacturer: Toyota
- Production: 1988–1992

Layout
- Configuration: Inline 4
- Displacement: 1.4 L (1,397 cc)
- Cylinder bore: 76 mm (2.99 in)
- Piston stroke: 77 mm (3.03 in)
- Cylinder block material: Cast iron
- Cylinder head material: Aluminum
- Valvetrain: DOHC 4 valves x cyl.

Combustion
- Fuel type: Gasoline
- Cooling system: Water cooled

Output
- Power output: 60 kW (80 hp; 82 PS)
- Specific power: 42.9 kW (57.5 hp; 58.3 PS)
- Torque output: 11.9 kg⋅m (117 N⋅m; 86 lbf⋅ft)

The 1.4 L (1,397 cc) 6A-FC was produced from 1989 through 1992. It is the only 1.4 variant of the A-series engines. Output is 60 kW (80 hp; 82 PS) and 11.9 kg⋅m (117 N⋅m; 86 lbf⋅ft).

It is a 4-valve, narrow-valve angle DOHC engine using Toyota's High-Mecha Twin Cam system, mainly installed in Australian and European market Corollas.

=== 6A-FC ===
Applications:

- AE90 Corolla and Holden Nova 1989–1992 (Australia only)

== 7A ==
7A
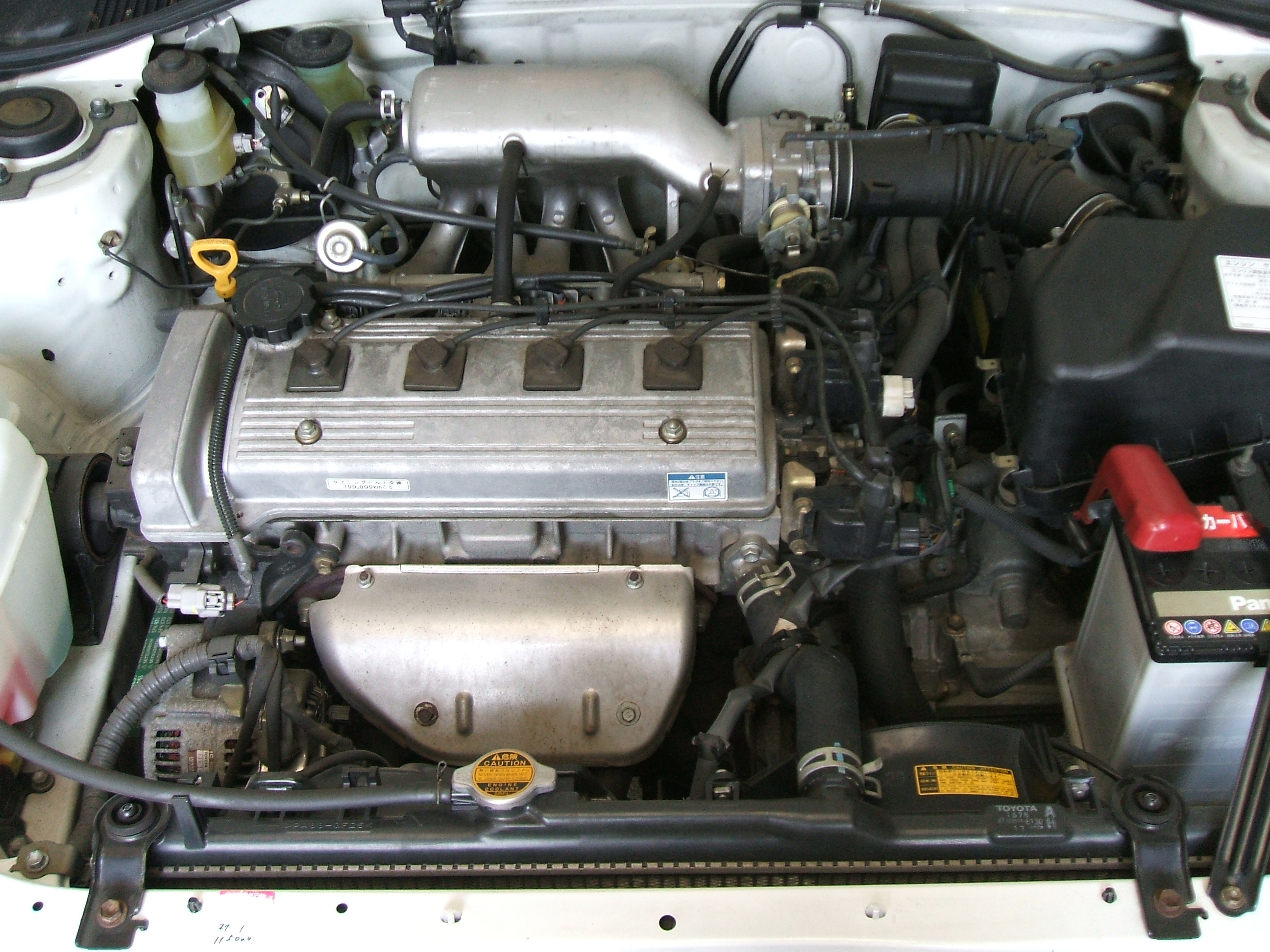
- 7A-FE Engine

Overview
- Manufacturer: Toyota
- Production: 1990–2002

Layout
- Configuration: Inline 4
- Displacement: 1,762 cc (1.8 L)
- Cylinder bore: 81 mm (3.2 in)
- Piston stroke: 85.5 mm (3.37 in)
- Cylinder block material: Cast iron
- Cylinder head material: Aluminum
- Valvetrain: DOHC 4 valves x cyl.
- Compression ratio: 9.5:1

Combustion
- Fuel system: Fuel injection
- Fuel type: Gasoline
- Cooling system: Water cooled

Output
- Power output: 78 kW (105 hp; 106 PS); 82 kW (110 hp; 112 PS); 86 kW (115 hp; 117 PS); 88 kW (118 hp; 120 PS)
- Torque output: 15.2 kg⋅m (149 N⋅m; 110 lbf⋅ft); 15.9 kg⋅m (156 N⋅m; 115 lbf⋅ft); 16 kg⋅m (157 N⋅m; 116 lbf⋅ft); 16.2 kg⋅m (159 N⋅m; 117 lbf⋅ft); 24.2 kg⋅m (237 N⋅m; 175 lbf⋅ft)

Chronology
- Predecessor: 3T
- Successor: 1ZZ

The 1,762 cc (1.8 L) 7A was produced from 1990 through 2002. Cylinder bore and stroke was 81 mm × 85.5 mm (3.19 in × 3.37 in). The largest production A-series engine was the 7A-FE, produced from 1993 through 2002. It is a 4-valve DOHC narrow-valve angle economy engine stroked out from the 4A, also using the 4A-FE's High-Mecha Twin Cam concept. It is a non-interference type engine.

An early Canadian version produced 86 kW (115 hp; 117 PS) at 5600 rpm and 15.2 kg⋅m (149 N⋅m; 110 lbf⋅ft) at 2800 rpm. The common (1993 to 1995 North American) version is rated at 82 kW (110 hp; 112 PS) at 5600 rpm and 15.9 kg⋅m (156 N⋅m; 115 lbf⋅ft) at 2800 rpm. The engine output was changed for the 1996 to 1997 (North American) version mainly due to a different antipollution system and different intake which made it rate at 78 kW (105 hp; 106 PS) at 5200 rpm and 16.2 kg⋅m (159 N⋅m; 117 lbf⋅ft) of torque at 2800 rpm.

In the United States, the most common application of the 7A-FE was in the 1993–1997 Corolla (7th generation). It was also used in some 1994–1999 Celicas (6th generation) at the base ST trim level, as well as the Toyota Corolla's clone, the Geo Prizm.

The Indonesian and Russian versions of the 7A-FE has the strongest naturally aspirated output at 120 PS (88 kW; 118 hp) at 6000 rpm and 16 kg⋅m (157 N⋅m; 116 lbf⋅ft) at 4400 rpm. It was used in the AE112 Corolla from 1998 to 2001.

In the Australian market, the AE112 Corolla Sportivo had a turbocharged and intercooled 7A-FE, sometimes unofficially referred to as the "7A-FTE". This was a conversion as opposed to a ground-up turbo design, and retains the same 9.5:1 compression ratio used in the naturally aspirated 7A-FE. Output was 115 kW (154 hp; 156 PS) at 5,600 rpm and torque was 24.2 kg⋅m (237 N⋅m; 175 lbf⋅ft) at 3600 rpm, thanks to an IHI RHF4B turbocharger with 0.55 bar of boost pressure. Only 110 Corolla Sportivos were built.

Toyota never made a wide-valve angle high-performance engine based on the 7A called the "7A-GE", however many enthusiasts have created one using a combination of 7A-FE parts (block and crank), 4A-GE parts (head, pistons) and custom connecting rods. The 7A-FE has a smaller crank journal and smaller wrist pins (press fit), and so a few companies have made special rods to accommodate these builds. Likewise, an unofficial supercharged "7A-GZE" has also been built from 7A-FE parts (block, crank), 4A-GZE parts (head, pistons) and custom connecting rods.

=== 7A-FE ===
Applications:

- AT221 Avensis 1997–2000 (Europe only)
- AT191 Caldina 1996–1997 (Japan only)
- AT211 Caldina 1997–2001 (Japan only)
- AT191 Carina 1994–1996 (Japan only)
- AT211 Carina 1996–2001 (Japan only)
- AT191 Carina E 1994–1997 (Europe only)
- AT200 Celica 1993–1999 (excluding Japan)
- AE92 Corolla/Conquest September 1993 – circa 1998 (South Africa)
- AE93 Corolla 1990–1992 (Australia only)
- AE102/103 Corolla 1992–1998 (excluding Japan)
- AE102 Corolla/Prizm 1993–1997 (North America)
- AE111 Corolla 1997–2000 (South Africa)
- AE111 Corolla 1998–2002 (Brazil)
- AE112/115 Corolla 1997–2002 (excluding Japan)
- AE115 Corolla Spacio 1997–2001 (Japan only)
- AE115 Corolla Linea Terra 1997–1999 (Europe only)
- AT191 Corona 1994–1997 (excluding Japan)
- AT211 Corona 1996–2001 (Japan only)
- AE115 Sprinter Carib 1995–2001 (Japan only)
- AE112 Corolla 1998–2001 (Indonesia and Australia)

== 8A ==
8A

Overview
- Manufacturer: Toyota
- Production: 1990–2006

Layout
- Configuration: Inline 4
- Displacement: 1.3 L (1,342 cc)
- Cylinder bore: 78.7 mm (3.10 in)
- Piston stroke: 69 mm (2.72 in)
- Cylinder block material: Cast iron
- Cylinder head material: Aluminum
- Valvetrain: DOHC 4 valves x cyl.
- Compression ratio: 9.3:1

Combustion
- Fuel system: Fuel injection
- Fuel type: Gasoline
- Cooling system: Water cooled

Output
- Power output: 64 kW (86 hp; 87 PS)
- Specific power: 64.1 hp (47.8 kW; 64.1 hp; 65.0 PS)
- Torque output: 11.2 kg⋅m (110 N⋅m; 81 lbf⋅ft)

Chronology
- Predecessor: 3T
- Successor: 4ZZ

The 1.3 L (1,342 cc) 8A was produced from 1990 through 2006 by Tianjin FAW Xiali for its Daihatsu and Toyota-based subcompacts. It uses the same cylinder bore of 78.7 mm (3.10 in) as the 5A but with a reduced stroke of 69 mm (2.72 in). It uses a four valves per cylinder DOHC head with narrow-valve angles. The High-Mecha Twin Cam system from the 4A-FE and 5A-FE was retained. Compression ratio is 9.3:1.

Output is 64 kW (86 hp; 87 PS) at 6,000 rpm and 11.2 kg⋅m (110 N⋅m; 81 lbf⋅ft) at 5200 rpm.

=== 8A-FE ===
Applications:

- AXP41 Toyota Vios 2002–2006 (China only)
- AXP41 Xiali Vizi 2002–2006 (China only)
- Haima CA7130 (China)
- Xiali 2000/Vela 2000–2012
- Xiali A+ 2005–2011
- Xiali Weizhi (China)
- Etsong Lubao QE6400/QE6440/FAW Lubao CA6410/Jiefang CA6440UA

== Production ==
The 1.3 L and 1.5 L A engines are built in Tianjin FAW Toyota Engine Co., Ltd. Plant No. 1.

== See also ==
- List of Toyota engines
