= Toyota Sprinter Marino =

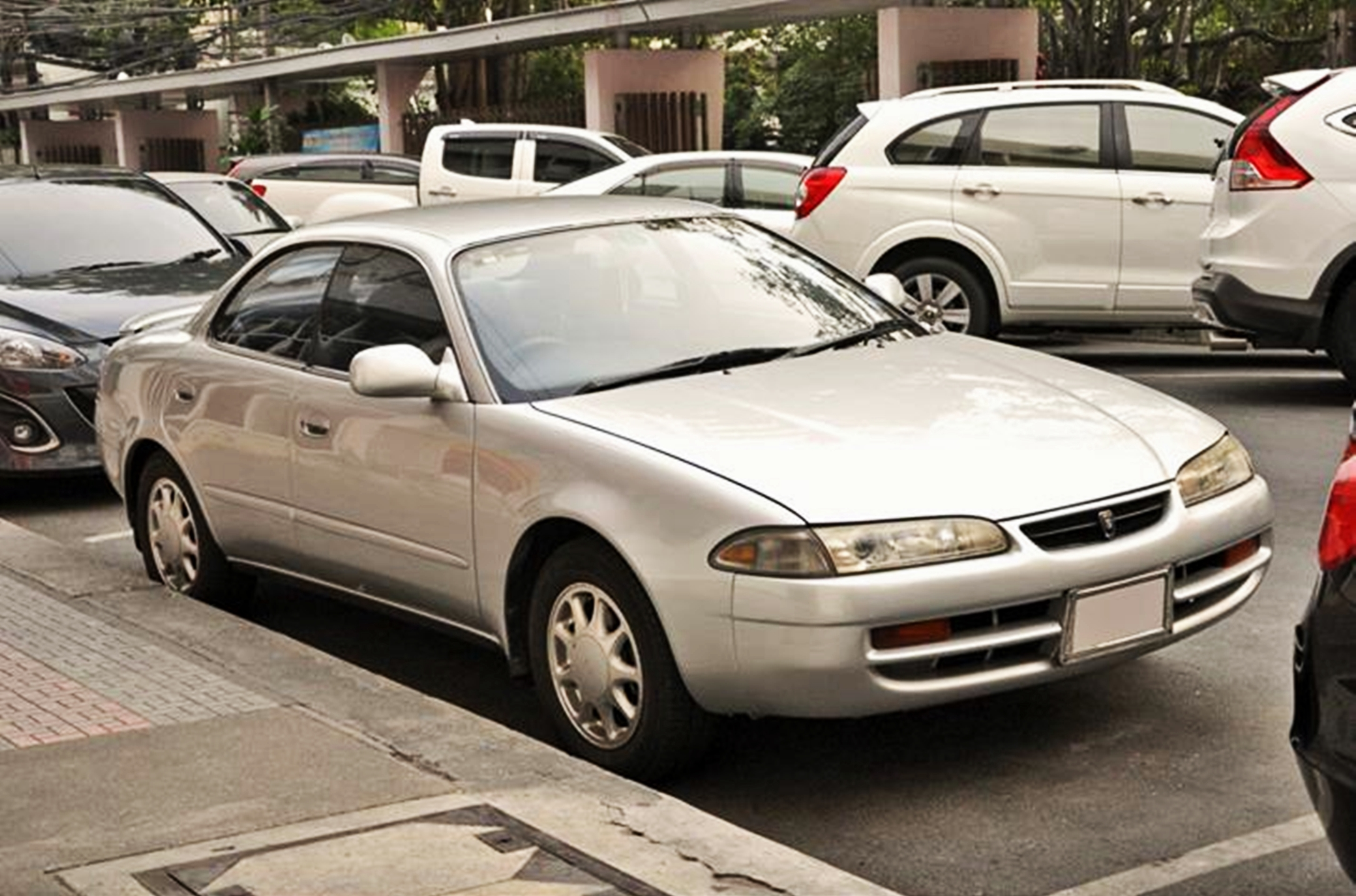
- Toyota Sprinter Marino (pre-facelift)

Overview
- Manufacturer: Toyota
- Model code: E100
- Also called: Toyota Corolla Ceres
- Production: May 1992 – June 1998
- Assembly: Japan: Yokosuka, Kanagawa (Kanto Auto Works)

Body and chassis
- Class: Compact car
- Body style: 4-door hardtop sedan
- Layout: Front-engine, front-wheel-drive
- Related: Toyota Corolla (E100); Toyota Sprinter (E100); Toyota Sprinter Trueno/Corolla Levin (E100); Geo Prizm (E100); Holden Nova (LG)

Powertrain
- Engine: Petrol: 1.5 L 5A-FE DOHC 16-valve I4 (AE100); 1.6 L 4A-FE DOHC 16-valve I4 (AE101); 1.6 L 4A-GE DOHC 20-valve I4 (AE101)
- Transmission: 4-speed A240L automatic; 4-speed A245E automatic; 5-speed C50 manual; 6-speed C56 manual

Dimensions
- Wheelbase: 2,465 mm (97.0 in)
- Length: 4,385 mm (172.6 in)
- Width: 1,695 mm (66.7 in)
- Height: 1,315 mm (51.8 in)
- Curb weight: 1,010–1,130 kg (2,226.7–2,491.2 lb)

The Toyota Sprinter Marino (Japanese: トヨタ・スプリンターマリノ, Hepburn: Toyota Supurintā Marino) is a four-door B-pillar hardtop sedan version of the Toyota Sprinter sedan produced between 1992 and 1998 (series E100 Corolla) for sale in Japan. The Toyota Corolla Ceres (Japanese: トヨタ・カローラセレス, Hepburn: Toyota Karōra Seresu) is a slightly restyled version of the Sprinter Marino, as was common practice by Japanese automakers in the 1980s and 1990s.

== Overview ==
The Sprinter Marino is named for Marino, Italy and was exclusive to Toyota Vista Store locations. While the Corolla Ceres is named after Ceres in Roman mythology and was exclusive to Toyota Corolla Store locations.

Both vehicles were built for Toyota under contract by Kanto Auto Works. The hardtop approach was used on various segments of core Toyota sedans by offering a more upscale hardtop version. These cars were offered for consumers who wanted the luxurious approach offered by the Crown hardtop, as well as the Mark II-Cresta-Chaser trio, and the next segment down on the hardtops version of Corona and Carina duo, called the Corona EXiV and the Carina ED which were all offered at reduced prices and reduced tax liability based on the vehicles size and engine displacement. The Ceres/Marino twins saw competition from other Japanese manufacturers in this size classification, such as the Nissan Presea, the Mazda Lantis and the Honda Integra.

The facelifted model was released in May 1994 with minor refreshments. Due to cost-cutting efforts as a result of the Japanese economic recession caused by the collapse of the Japanese asset price bubble, both vehicles were discontinued in June 1998.

The market segment occupied by the Sprinter Marino and Corolla Ceres was served by a new concept of vehicles Toyota manufactured under the WiLL brand, that was shared with products from other Japanese manufacturers and service providers.

== Gallery ==
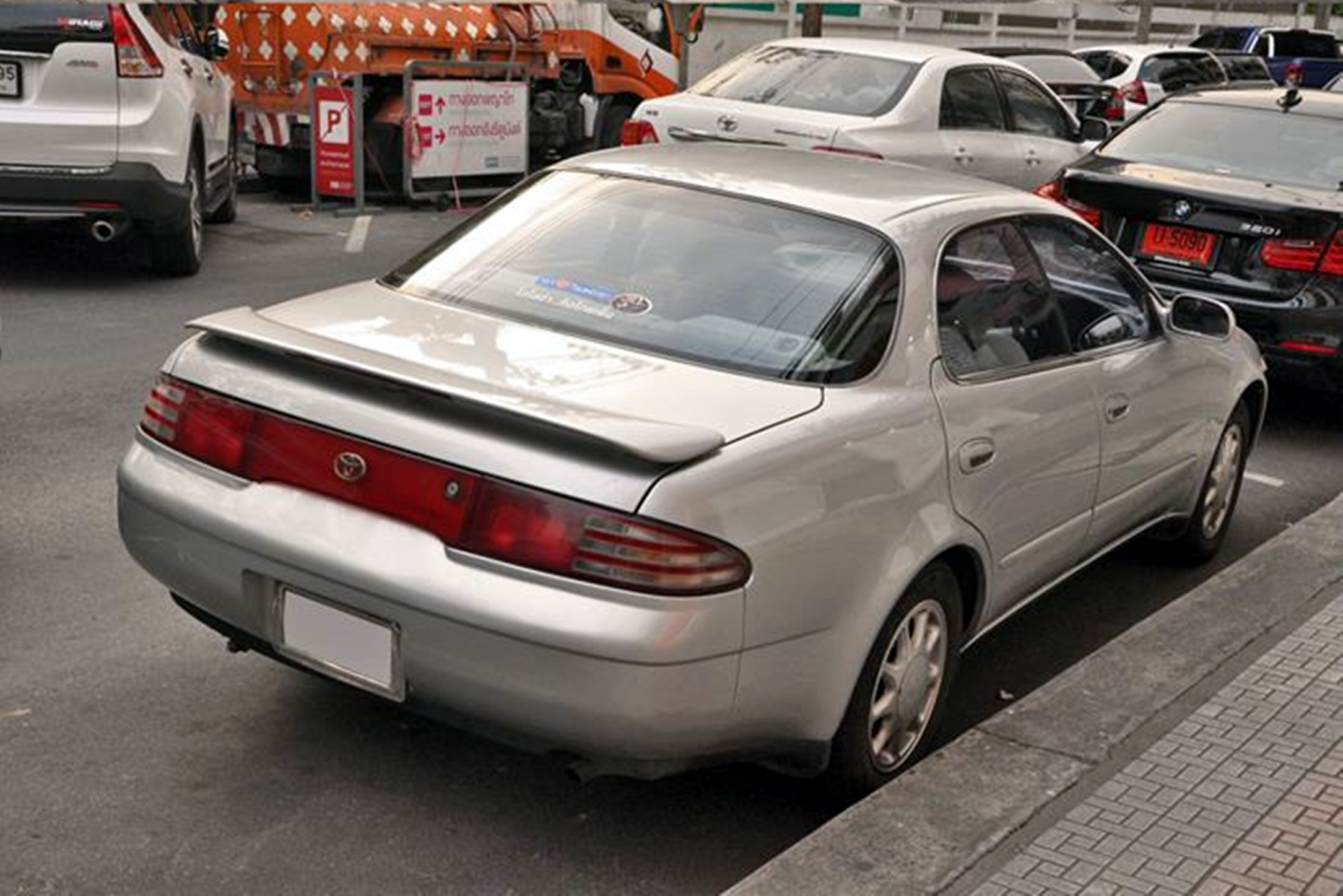
Sprinter Marino (pre-facelift)

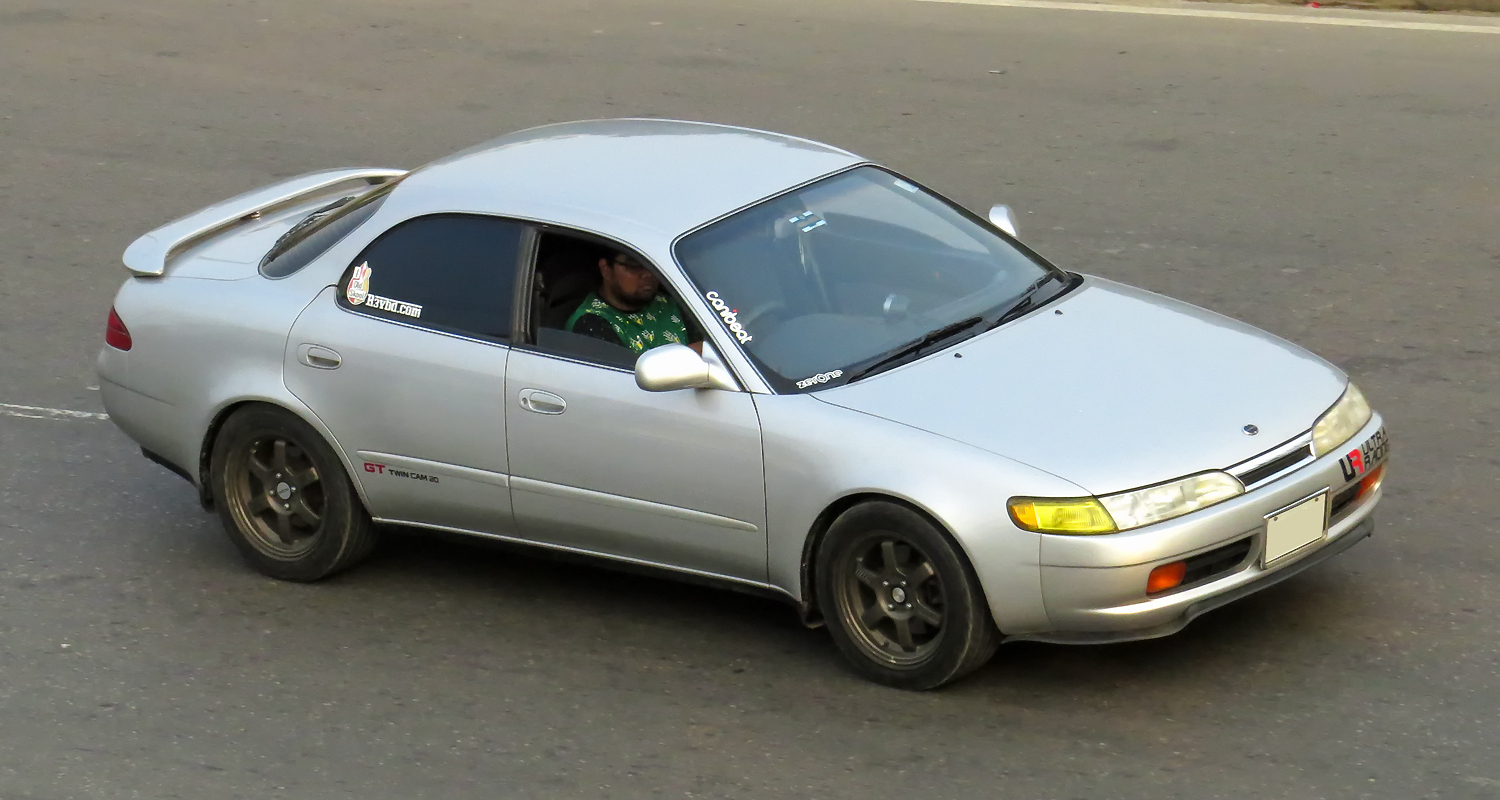
Corolla Ceres (pre-facelift)

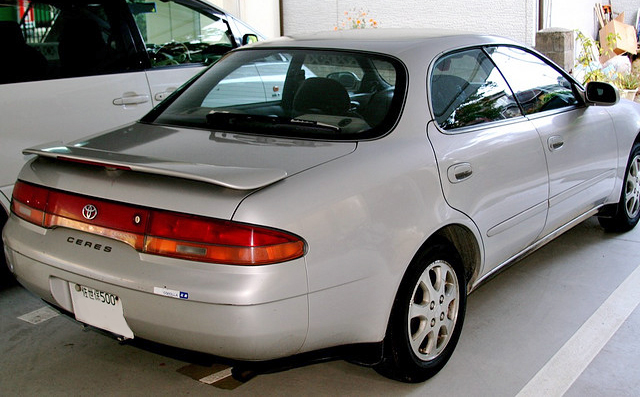
Corolla Ceres (pre-facelift)

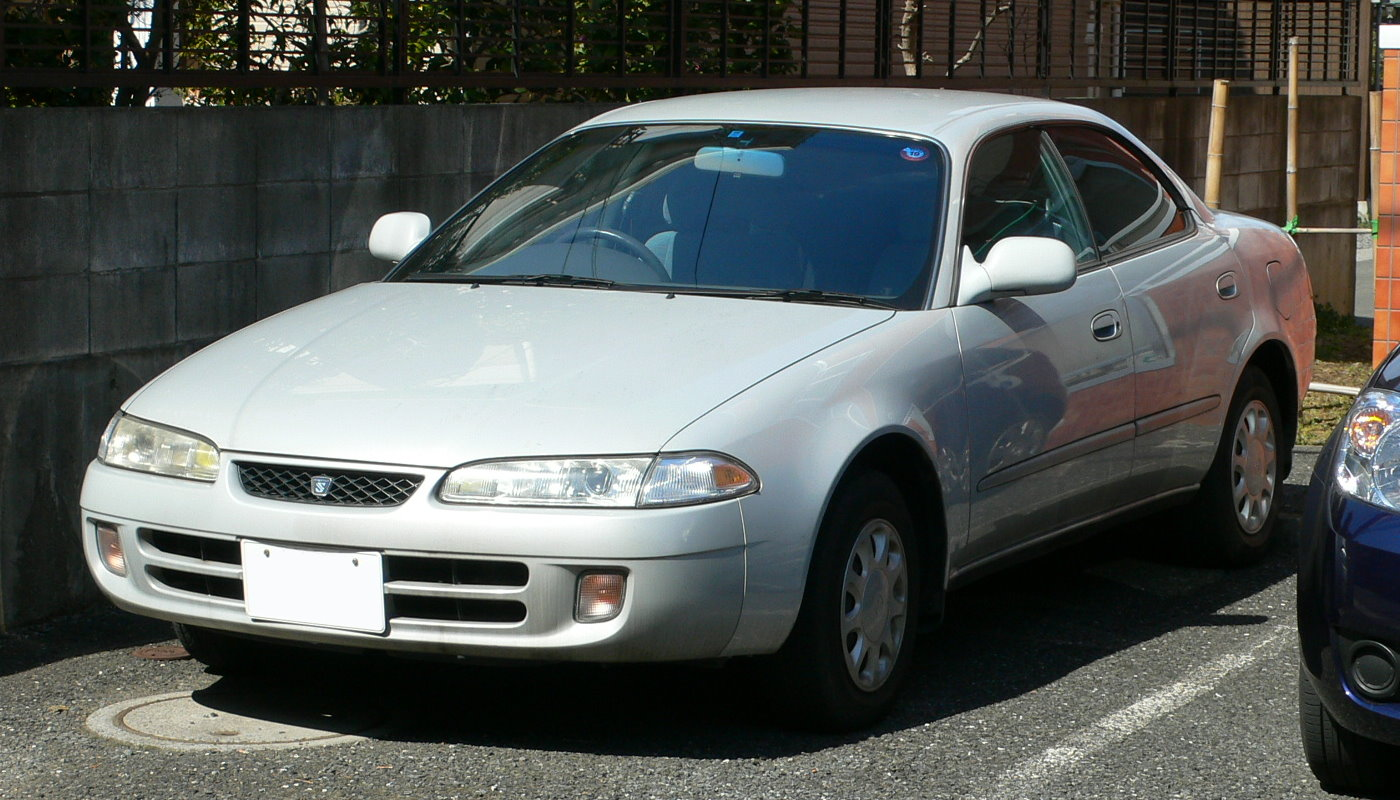
Sprinter Marino (facelift)

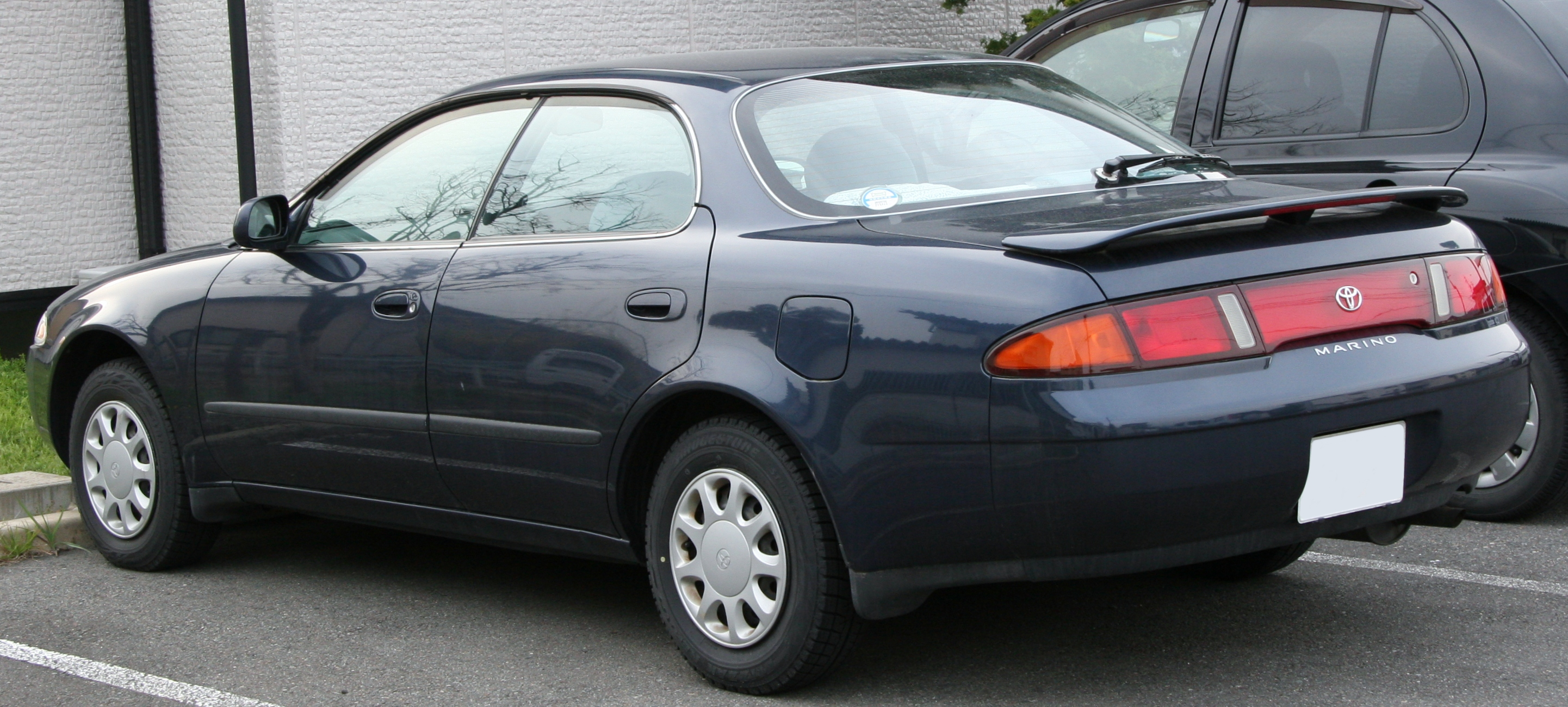
Sprinter Marino (facelift)

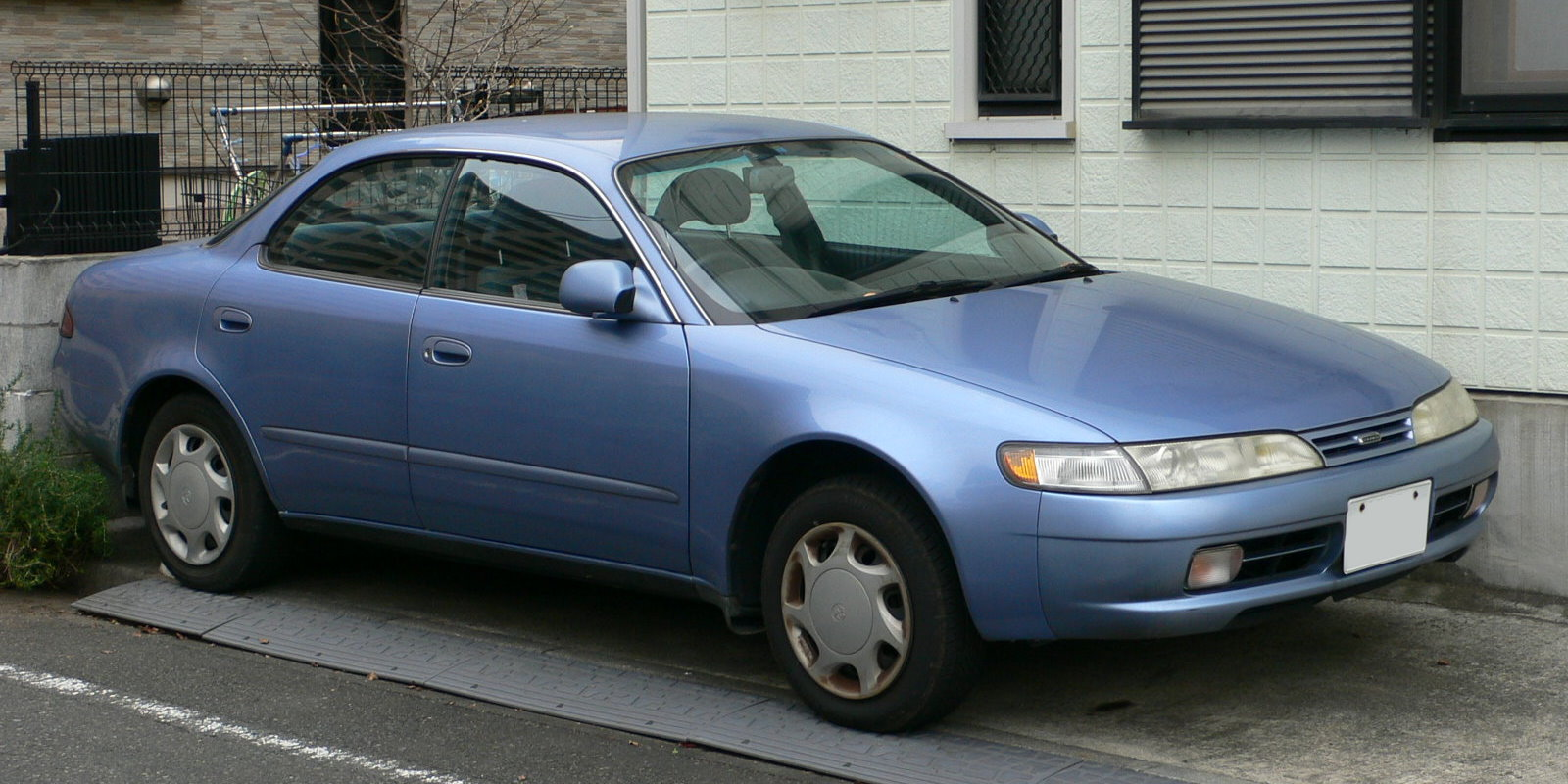
Corolla Ceres (facelift)

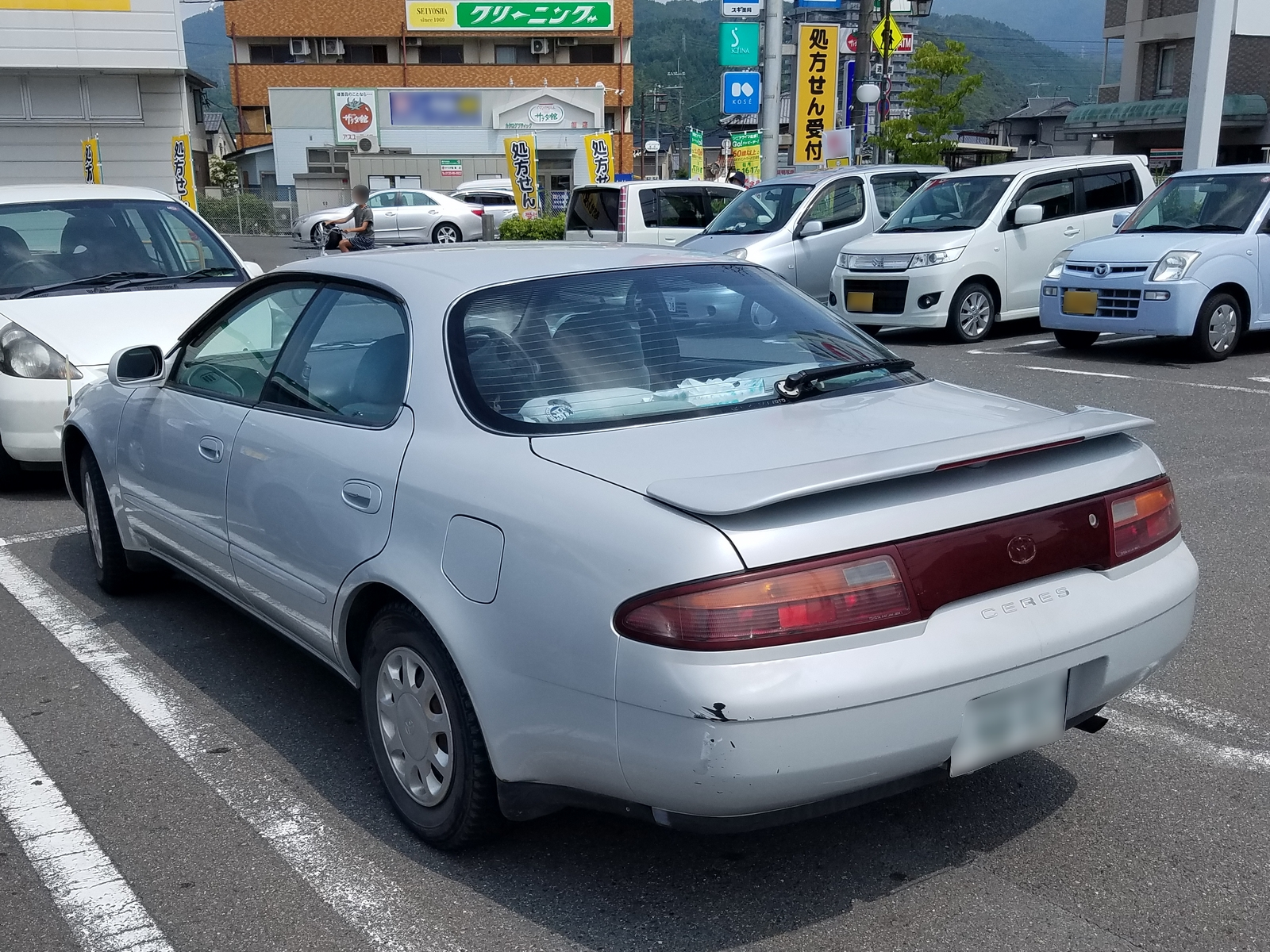
Corolla Ceres (facelift)

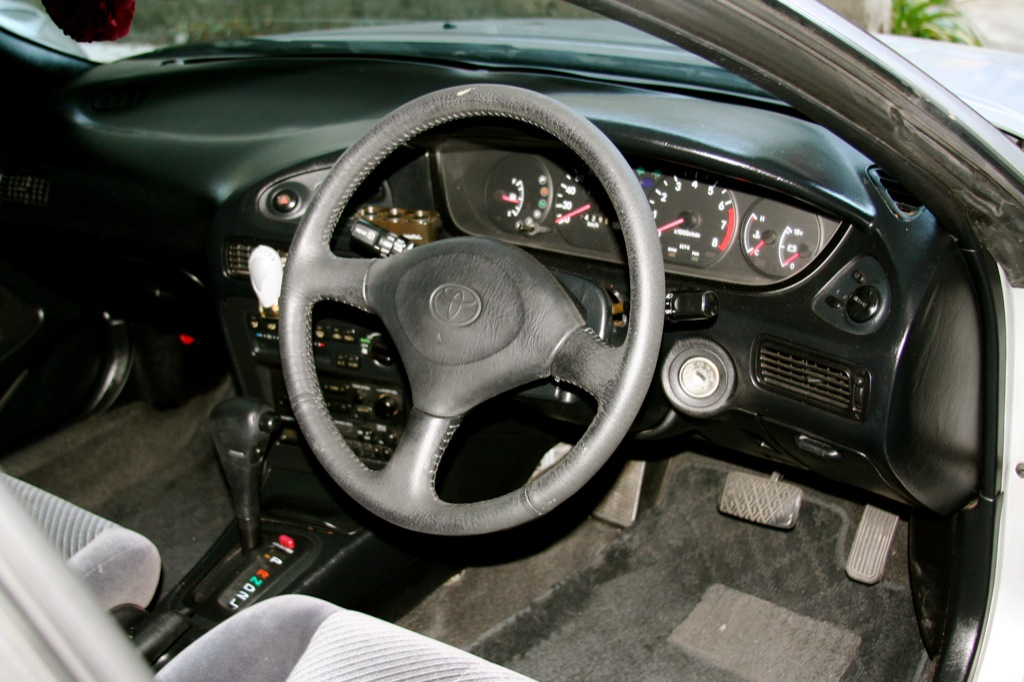
Interior (pre-facelift)

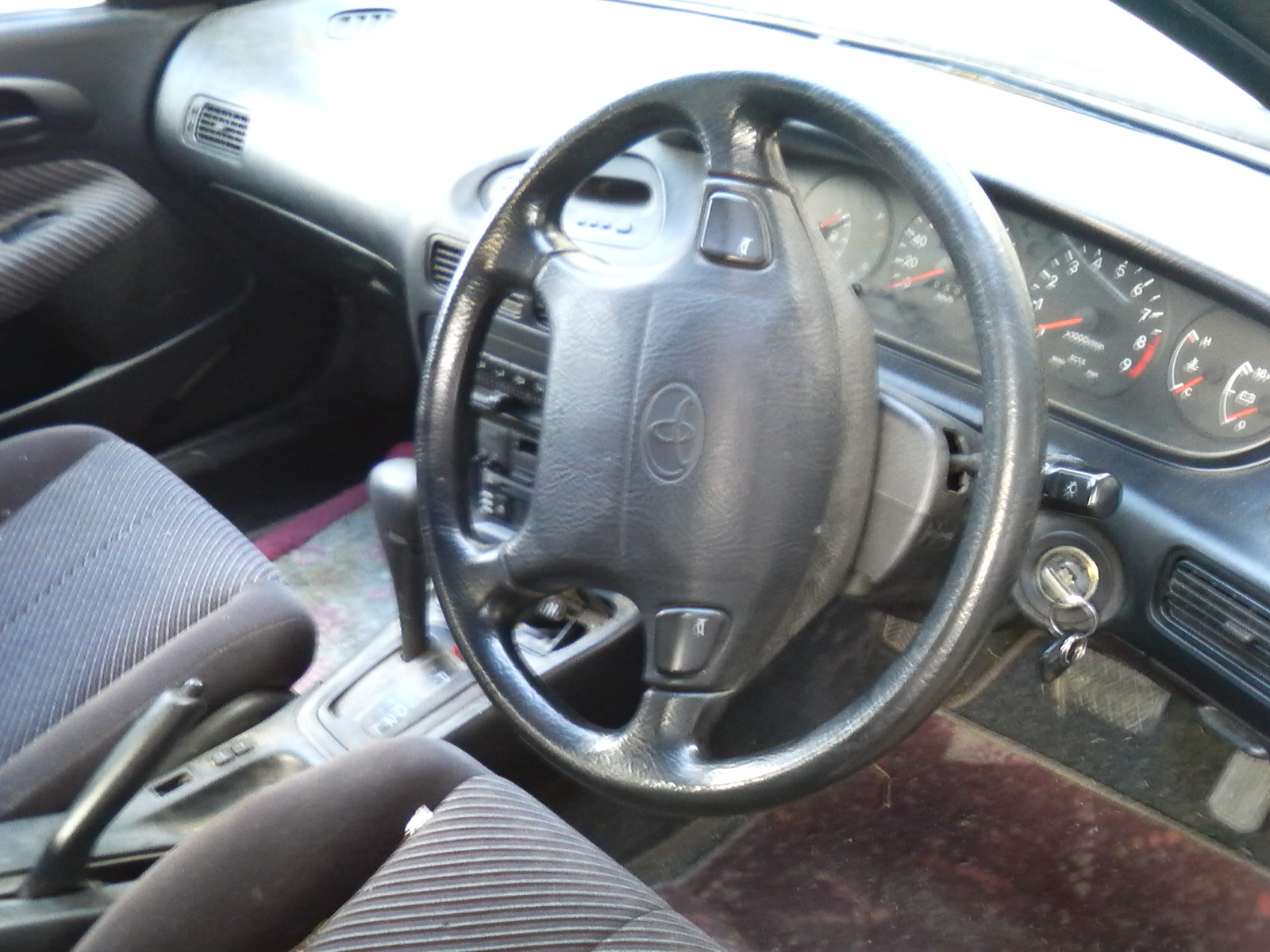
Interior (facelift)

== Powertrain ==
Code	Year	Engine	Power	Torque	Transmission	Trim
AE100	May 1992 – May 1995	1,498 cc (1.5 L; 91.4 cu in) 5A-FE I4	105 PS (77 kW; 104 hp)	135 N⋅m (100 lb⋅ft; 14 kg⋅m)	5-speed C50 manual 4-speed A240L automatic	F F Extra Package; Black Special Edition (December 1994)
AE100	May 1995 – July 1998	1,498 cc (1.5 L; 91.4 cu in) 5A-FE I4	100 PS (74 kW; 99 hp)	137 N⋅m (101 lb⋅ft; 14 kg⋅m)	5-speed C50 manual 4-speed A240L automatic	F F Extra Package; F Limited (August 1995 and December 1996)
AE101	May 1992 – April 1997	1,587 cc (1.6 L; 96.8 cu in) 4A-FE I4	115 PS (85 kW; 113 hp)	147 N⋅m (108 lb⋅ft; 15 kg⋅m)	5-speed C50 manual 4-speed A245E automatic	X X Extra Package; Black Marino/Ceres (December 1992); Black Special Edition (December 1994); X Limited (August 1995 and December 1996)
AE101	April 1997 – July 1998	1,587 cc (1.6 L; 96.8 cu in) 4A-FE I4	110 PS (81 kW; 108 hp)	149 N⋅m (110 lb⋅ft; 15 kg⋅m)	5-speed C50 manual 4-speed A245E automatic	X X Extra Package
AE101	May 1992 – May 1995	1,587 cc (1.6 L; 96.8 cu in) 4A-GE "Silver Top" I4	160 PS (118 kW; 158 hp)	162 N⋅m (119 lb⋅ft; 17 kg⋅m)	5-speed C52 manual 4-speed A245E automatic	G G Extra Package; Black Marino/Ceres G (December 1992)
AE101	May 1995 – July 1998	1,587 cc (1.6 L; 96.8 cu in) 4A-GE "Black Top" I4	165 PS (121 kW; 163 hp)	162 N⋅m (119 lb⋅ft; 17 kg⋅m)	6-speed C56 manual 4-speed A245E automatic	G G Extra Package

== Safety ==
Automatic door locking was a mandatory feature on the vehicle beginning in its first year of production (1991) – as per Japanese vehicular law (1991) whereby all vehicles for the JDM must lock all doors at 18 km/h (11 mph). A driver's airbag was available as option since the beginning and later became standard in May 1996 along with ABS. In May 1997, the body structure was upgraded with GOA (Global Outstanding Assessment) technology and additional passenger's airbag as standard.
