= T-VIS =

Toyota Variable Induction System, or T-VIS, is a variable intake system designed by Toyota to improve the low-end performance of multi-valve engines.

T-VIS is intended to improve the low-end torque of high-performance, four-stroke internal combustion engines - by changing the geometry of the intake manifold according to the engine rotation speed. The system uses two separate intake runners per cylinder, one being equipped with a butterfly valve that can either open or close the runner. All valves are attached to a common shaft which is rotated by a vacuum actuator outside the manifold. T-VIS does not actually keep one of the intake valves from opening or seal off the port for one valve.

The engine control unit (ECU) allows vacuum into the actuator by powering a solenoid valve when the engine rotation speed is low. At higher engine speeds (e.g. 4,200 rpm), vacuum is cut off and a spring inside the actuator causes the butterfly valve to fully open. The idea behind the system is that in the lower engine speed band, the speed of the intake air will be increased because the intake runner cross section per cylinder is smaller. However, when engine speed increases, the second runner is opened, decreasing airflow speed, but increasing the airflow volume, better matching the engine's airflow needs at higher revolutions and improving top end power. With modified engines it may be desirable to have the T-VIS open earlier than stock, because modifications that improve an engine's power output may do so by increasing airflow per engine revolution, resulting in a high airflow at a lower rpm.

In addition to providing more air at higher engine speeds, the system also creates a swirl in the combustion chamber at lower engine speeds. The swirl makes for more efficient combustion, and is due to the asymmetric nature of the airflow with one intake runner closed.

Applications:

- 1982.08–1990 1G-GEU/1G-GE
- 1983–1989 4A-GE
- 1986–1989 3S-GE (Both Rev 1 and Rev 2 of the 1st Generation 3S-GE)
- 1986–1993/1995 3S-GTE (through 1995 in US market, 1993 everywhere else; 1st & 2nd generation motors only)
- 1997–2000 7A-FE (lean burn models only)

== See also ==
- Acoustic Control Induction System
- Variable length intake manifold
