= Toyota Auris =

Compact car model from Toyota

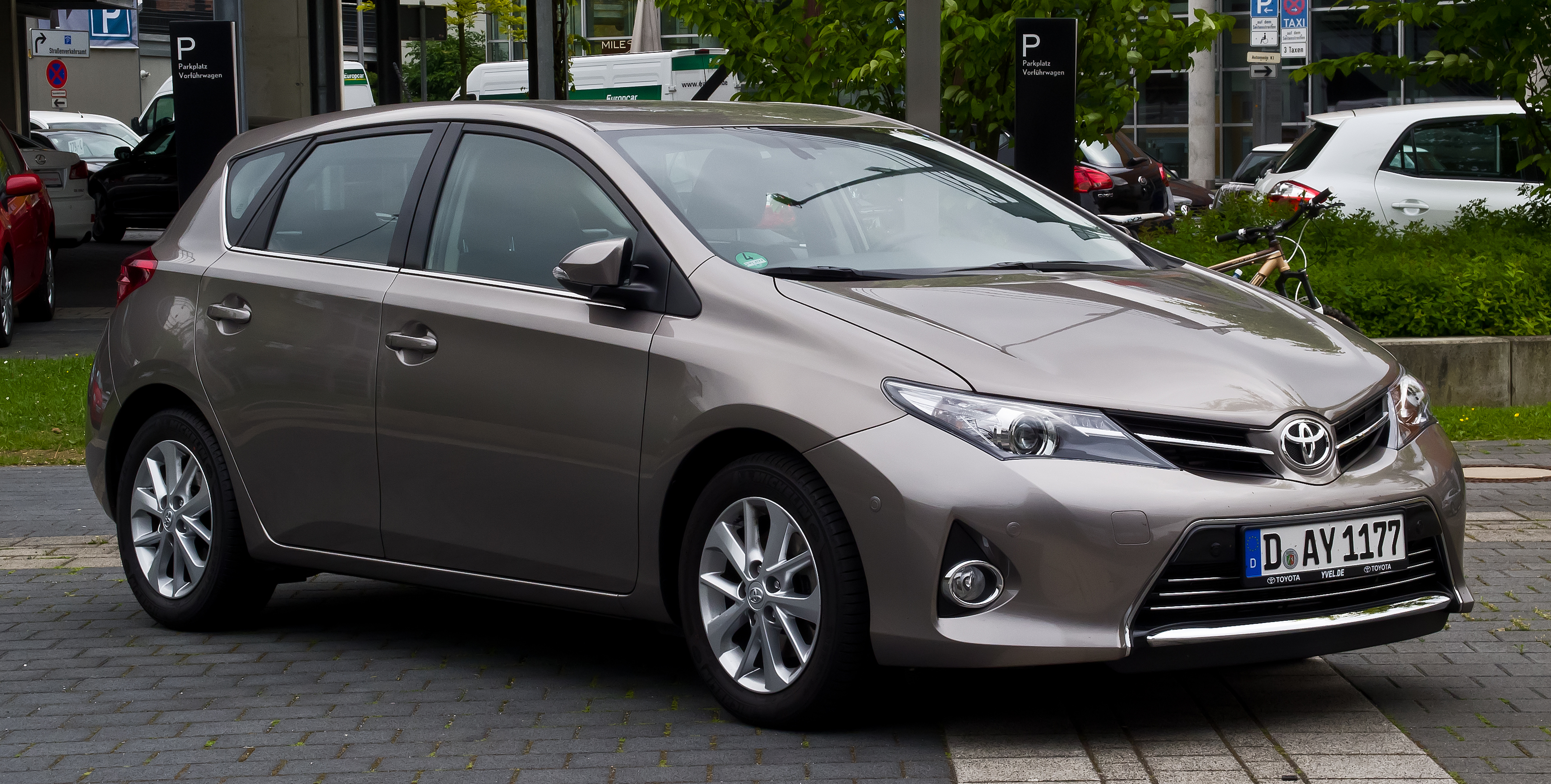
- 2013 Toyota Auris 2.0 D-4D Executive (ADE180, Germany)

Overview
- Manufacturer: Toyota
- Also called: Toyota Corolla (Australasia); Scion iM (North America, 2015–2016); Toyota Corolla iM (North America, 2016–2018)
- Production: October 2006 – July 2020

Body and chassis
- Class: Compact car (C)
- Layout: Front-engine, front-wheel drive; Front-engine, four-wheel drive

Chronology
- Predecessor: Toyota Corolla (E120) – hatchback
- Successor: Toyota Corolla (E210) – hatchback, estate car; Toyota GR Corolla – Blade

The Toyota Auris (Japanese: トヨタ・オーリス, Hepburn: Toyota Ōrisu) is a compact car derived from the Corolla, manufactured and sold by Toyota. Introduced in 2006, the first generation three/five-door hatchback shared the platform with the E150 series Corolla, while the second generation five-door hatchback and estate car called "Touring Sports" uses the E180 platform. The "Auris" name is based on the Latin word for "gold", "aurum".

In Europe, Toyota positioned the Auris as the replacement for the Corolla hatchback, while the saloon car version continued with the Corolla nameplate. Starting with the E210 model, the Auris nameplate was discontinued and used the Corolla nameplate instead, except for Taiwan, retained the Auris nameplate for the hatchback version until July 2020.

For the first generation only, the more luxurious Auris was named Toyota Blade (Japanese: トヨタ・ブレイド, Hepburn: Toyota Bureido) in Japan. The Auris succeeded the Allex in Japan and the Corolla RunX. Toyota Australia and Toyota New Zealand resisted suggestions from Toyota Japan to adopt the new European Auris name for the Corolla.

The Japanese model went on sale at Netz dealerships on 23 October 2006, while European models went on sale in early 2007. The second generation was later available at Toyopet Store dealerships from 18 April 2016.

== First generation (E150; 2006) ==
First generation (E150)
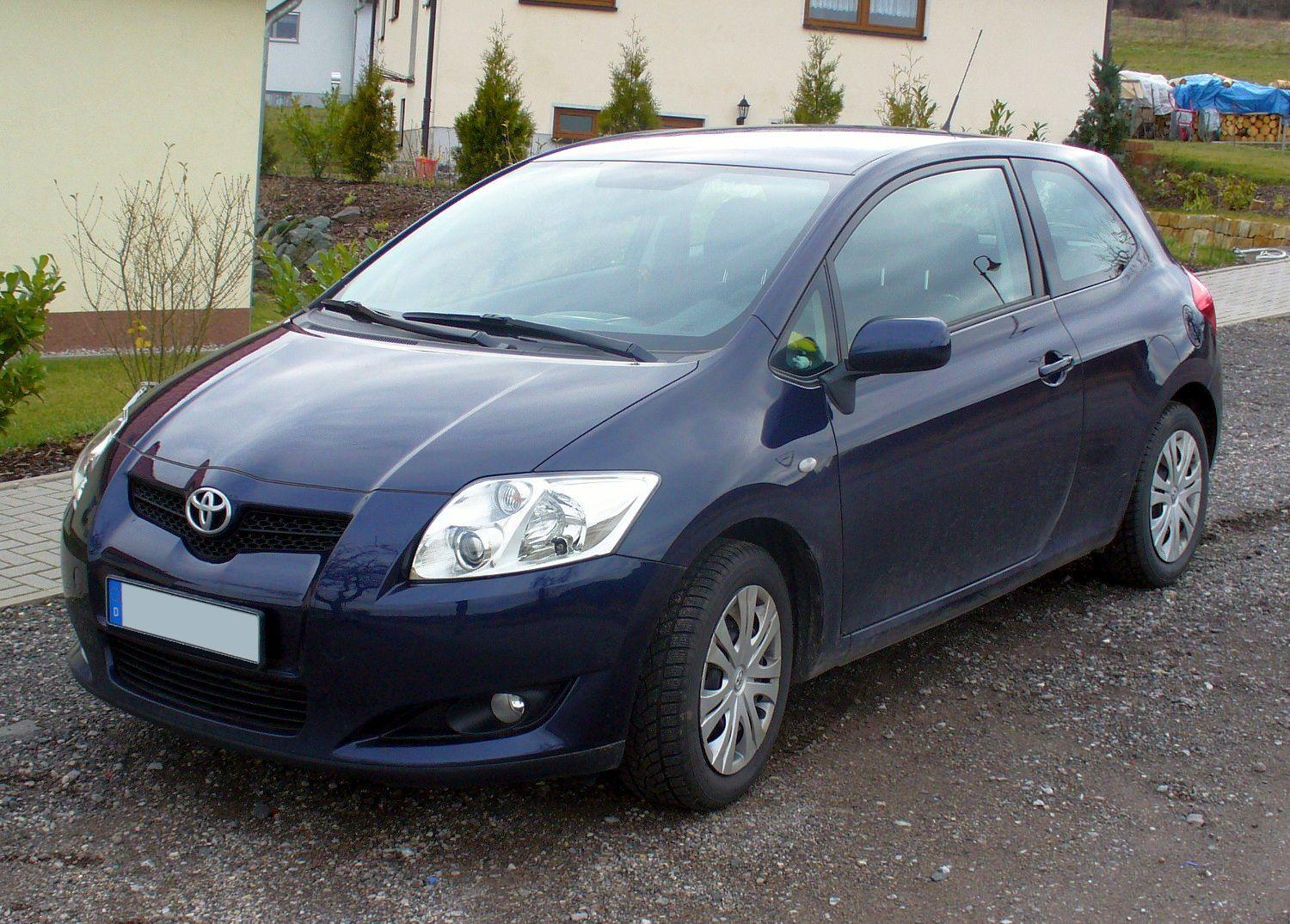
- Pre-facelift Toyota Auris 3-door (Germany)

Overview
- Also called: Toyota Corolla (Australasia); Toyota Blade (Japan)
- Production: October 2006 – July 2012
- Assembly: Japan: Toyota, Aichi (Takaoka plant); Japan: Kanegasaki, Iwate (KAW); Turkey: Adapazarı (TMMT); United Kingdom: Burnaston (TMUK)
- Designer: Koichi Suga and Samuel Guinefoleau (2004)

Body and chassis
- Body style: 3/5-door hatchback; 5-door panel van (Ireland)
- Platform: Toyota New MC platform
- Related: Toyota Corolla (E140/E150); Scion xB/Toyota Corolla Rumion

Powertrain
- Engine: Petrol: 1.33L 1NR-FE I4; 1.4L 4ZZ-FE I4; 1.5L 1NZ-FE I4; 1.6L 1ZR-FE/FAE I4; 1.8L 2ZR-FE I4; 1.8L 2ZR-FAE I4 (since 10/2009); 2.4L 2AZ-FE I4 (Blade); 3.5L 2GR-FE V6 (Blade Master); Diesel: 1.4L 1ND-TV I4; 2.0L 1AD-FTV I4; 2.2L 2AD-FHV I4
- Transmission: 4-speed automatic; 5-speed MultiMode; 5/6-speed manual; CVT (Japan)

Dimensions
- Wheelbase: 2,600 mm (102.4 in)
- Length: 4,224 mm (166.3 in)
- Width: 1,760 mm (69.3 in)
- Height: 1,516 mm (59.7 in)
- Kerb weight: 1,240–1,370 kg (2,734–3,020 lb)

The Auris space concept is a concept using Vibrant Clarity design philosophy. It included panoramic glass roof, flat rear passenger floor, high window surfaces, 19-inch alloy wheels, free form geometric lamps, prominent brake callipers, deep rear bumper with integrated chrome exhausts, gold coloured body.

The vehicle was unveiled at the October 2006 Paris Motor Show. Exterior styling was done by ED², Toyota's European design base located in southern France.

The former Kanto Auto Works produced the Auris and Blade from October 2006 to November 2011.

The Auris received a five star cabin protection rating from Euro NCAP for adults, but four stars for children.

=== Markets ===
==== Japan ====
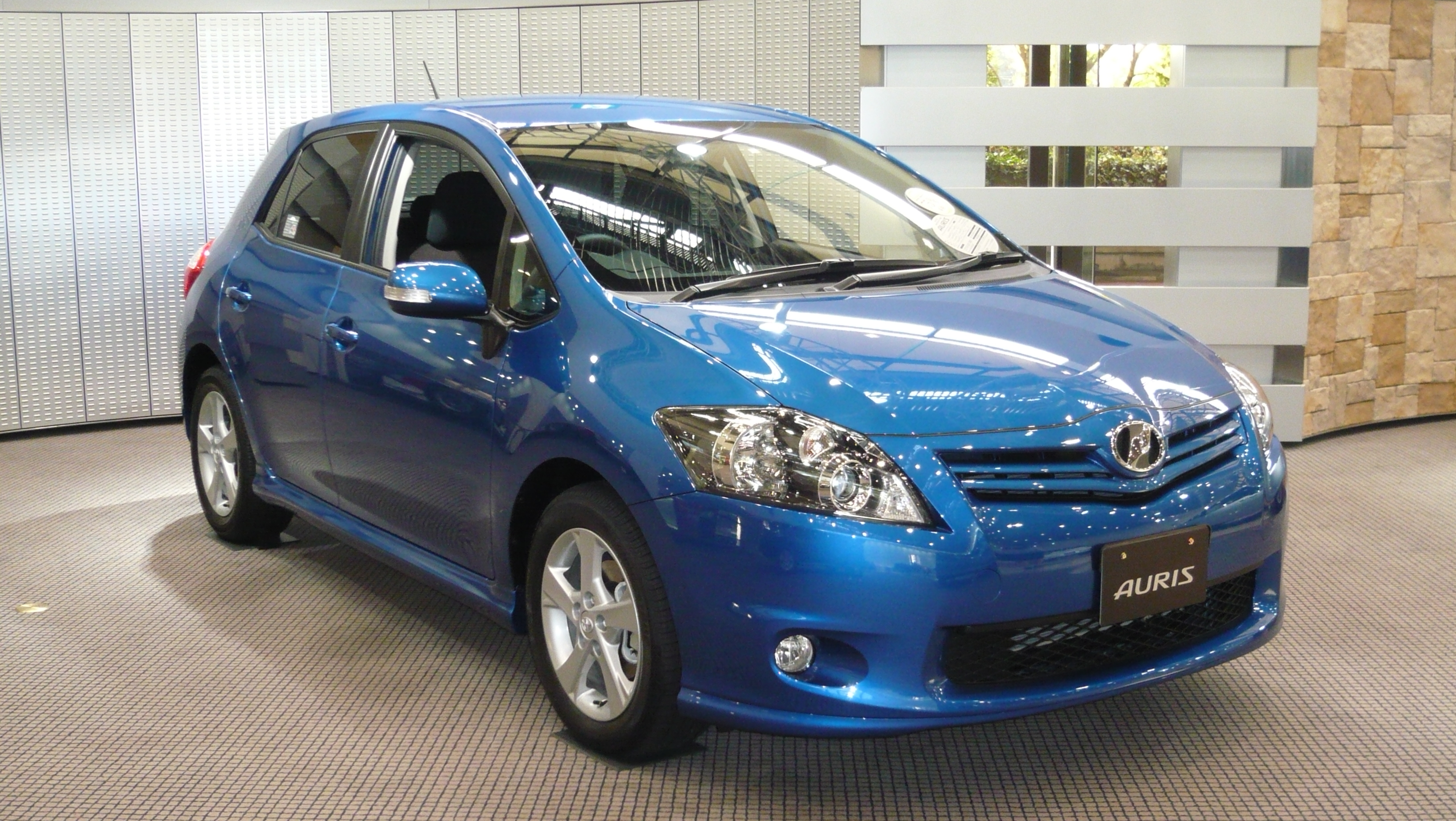
Facelift Auris 180G (ZRE152, Japan)

Introduced as a new model in 2006, the Auris replaced the Corolla Runx and Allex. Trim levels were 150X, 180G and RS. For model year 2007 on Japanese models only, G-BOOK, a subscription telematics service, was offered as an option. Japanese models were built by Iwate Plant, Kanto Auto Works, Ltd.

S package TUMI version (2007)

Designed by TUMI, this was a Japanese market limited edition (1000 units) version. It included model specific seat cloth, floor mats, a luggage mat, illuminated scuff plates, shift knob, instrument panel ornament and badging.

The vehicles were sold through Toyota's Netz dealers. Prices were between ¥2,058,000 and ¥2,499,000.

Grayge selection (2008)

This version came with a grey interior, dual zone climate control, passenger side under seat tray. The 150X M package version added rear privacy glass, smart entry and start system and anti theft system. The models went on sale on 29 January 2008, through Toyota's Netz dealers.

With the update of 2008, keyless entry, under seat tray became standard on all models.

Auris GT Concept

In January 2011, Toyota revealed the Toyota Auris GT at the Tokyo Auto Salon. Based on a 1.8L Auris. All equipment is available for purchase individually except for the supercharger. The concept was shown in Gold metallic paint with a black TRD graphic along the lower side of the car.

Chassis codes	(DBA-)ZRE152H-BHFEP	(DBA-)ZRE152H-BHXEK	(DBA-)ZRE154H-BHXEK	(DBA-)NZE151H-BHXNK	(DBA-)NZE154H-BHXNK	(DBA-)ZRE152H-BHXEP	(DBA-)ZRE154H-BHXEP
Model	RS	180G 2WD	180G 4WD	150X 2WD	150X 4WD	MY09 180G 2WD	MY09 180G 4WD
Drive	FWD	FWD	4WD	FWD	4WD	FWD	4WD
Engine	2ZR-FAE	2ZR-FE	2ZR-FE	1NZ-FE	1NZ-FE	2ZR-FAE	2ZR-FAE

Model	Years	Type/code	Power at rpm	Torque at rpm
150X 2WD	2006–2012	1,496 cc (91.3 cu in) 1NZ-FE	110 PS (81 kW; 108 hp) at 6000	140 N⋅m (103 lbf⋅ft) at 4400
150X 4WD	2006–2012	1,496 cc (91.3 cu in) 1NZ-FE	105 PS (77 kW; 104 hp) at 6000	135 N⋅m (100 lb⋅ft) at 4400
180G 2WD	2006–2009	1,797 cc (109.7 cu in) 2ZR-FE	136 PS (100 kW; 134 hp) at 6000	175 N⋅m (129 lb⋅ft) at 4400
180G 2WD	2009–2012	1,797 cc (109.7 cu in) 2ZR-FAE	144 PS (106 kW; 142 hp) at 6400	176 N⋅m (130 lb⋅ft) at 4400
180G 4WD	2006–2009	1,797 cc (109.7 cu in) 2ZR-FE	127 PS (93 kW; 125 hp) at 6000	166 N⋅m (122 lb⋅ft) at 4400
180G 4WD	2009–2012	1,797 cc (109.7 cu in) 2ZR-FAE	136 PS (100 kW; 134 hp) at 6400	167 N⋅m (123 lb⋅ft) at 4400
RS	2009–2012	1,797 cc (109.7 cu in) 2ZR-FAE	147 PS (108 kW; 145 hp) at 6400	180 N⋅m (130 lb⋅ft) at 4000

Model	Years	Type	Forward ratio	Reverse ratio	Final drive ratio
150X 2WD	2006–2012	Super CVT-i with 6-speed	2.386–0.411	2.505	5.698
150X 4WD	2006–2012	Super CVT-i with 6-speed	2.386–0.411	2.505	5.698
180G 2WD	2006–2012	Super CVT-i with 7-speed sequential shiftmatic	2.386–0.411	2.505	5.356
180G 4WD	2006–2012	Super CVT-i with 7-speed sequential shiftmatic	2.386–0.411	2.505	5.698
RS	2009–2012	6-speed manual	3.538–0.7	3.333	4.294

==== Australia ====
In Australia, the Auris was sold as "Corolla" hatchback with "Seca" emblem on the hatch door above the licence plate. Grades were: base-model "Ascent", mid-spec "Conquest", sports "Levin SX" and sports luxury "Levin ZR". All models are powered by the 1.8-litre 2ZR-FE engine, with either a six-speed manual or four-speed automatic. All but the Ascent came with standard alloy wheels and fog lights.

The Levin models had sports style body kits. Electric moonroof was only available as an option on Levin ZR. As of January 2009, ESC was available as standard on Conquest and Levin ZR and as an option on Ascent and Levin SX.

The Australian Corolla Hatchback received a facelift during the fourth quarter of 2009. The entire body design was given a sporty makeover. Major changes were made to the front and rear fascia, wheel designs and interior trims. The "Seca" branding was removed, and the tail light design was changed.

A newer bumper design was also adapted with a special "diffuser" fitted at the bottom to give the rear a sportier look; on either side of the diffuser are reflectors which were not featured on any previous Corolla Hatchback models. The front received new grille and revised headlamps.

Fog lights were removed from the Conquest model. Ascent continued with 15-inch steel wheels, while the rest received 16-inch alloys — Conquest and Levin SX shared the same alloys. Side mirrors now featured indicators. The trim materials were also changed, along with a new D-shaped sports steering wheel available on Conquest and Levin models. Other changes were also made to equipment and technology. Moonroof was still only available as an option on Levin ZR alone.

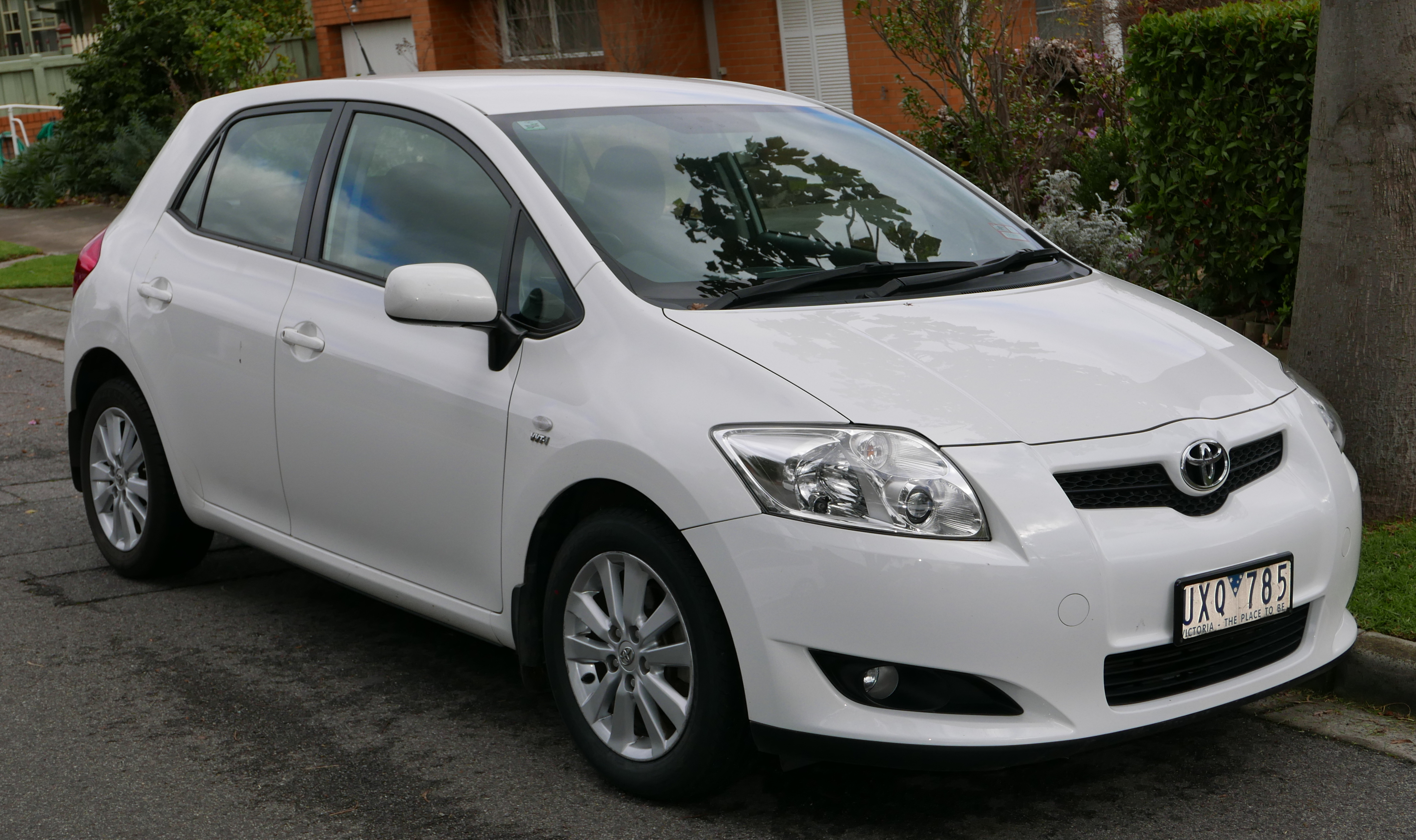
Pre-facelift Corolla Conquest Seca hatchback (ZRE152, Australia)

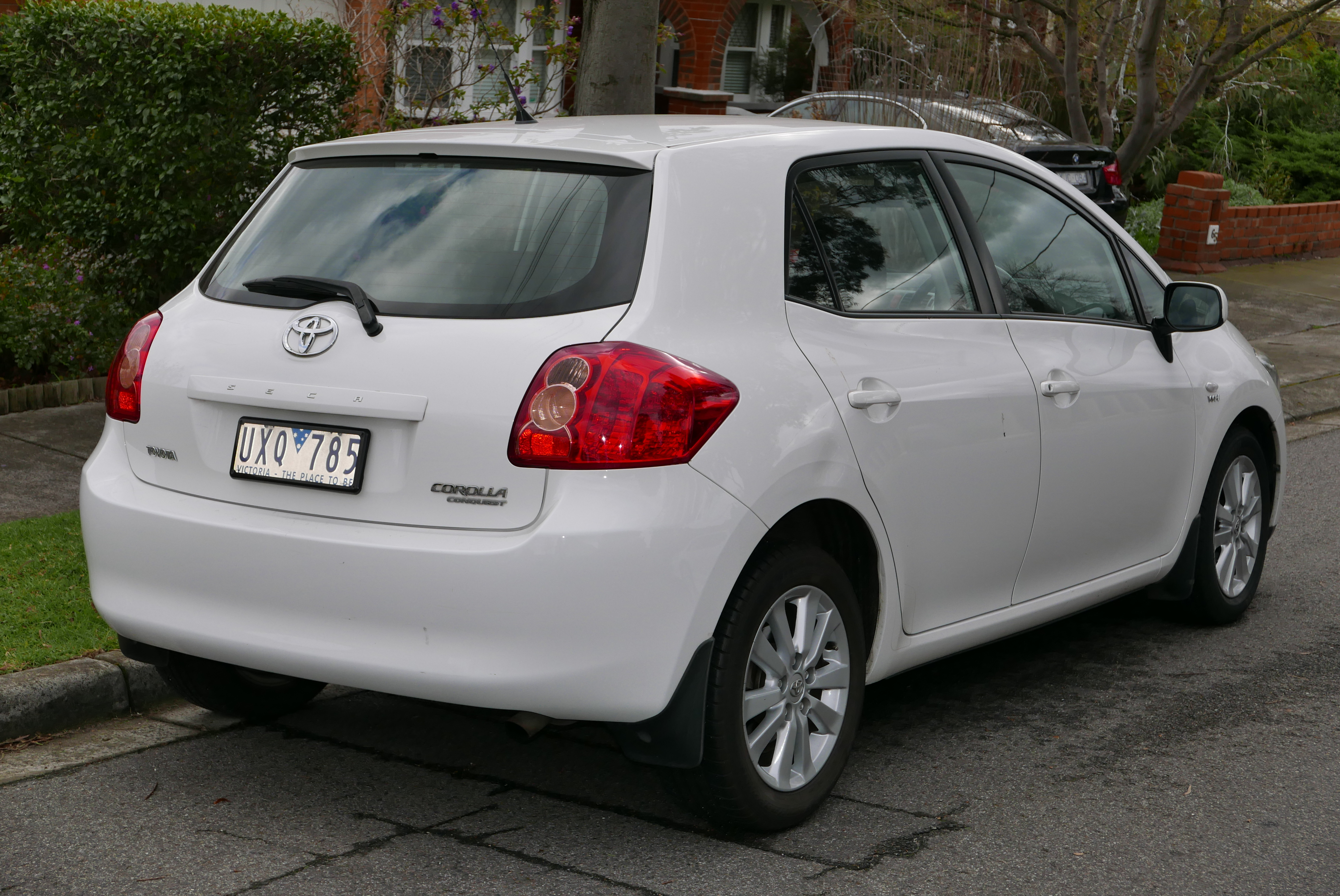
Pre-facelift Corolla Conquest Seca hatchback (ZRE152, Australia)

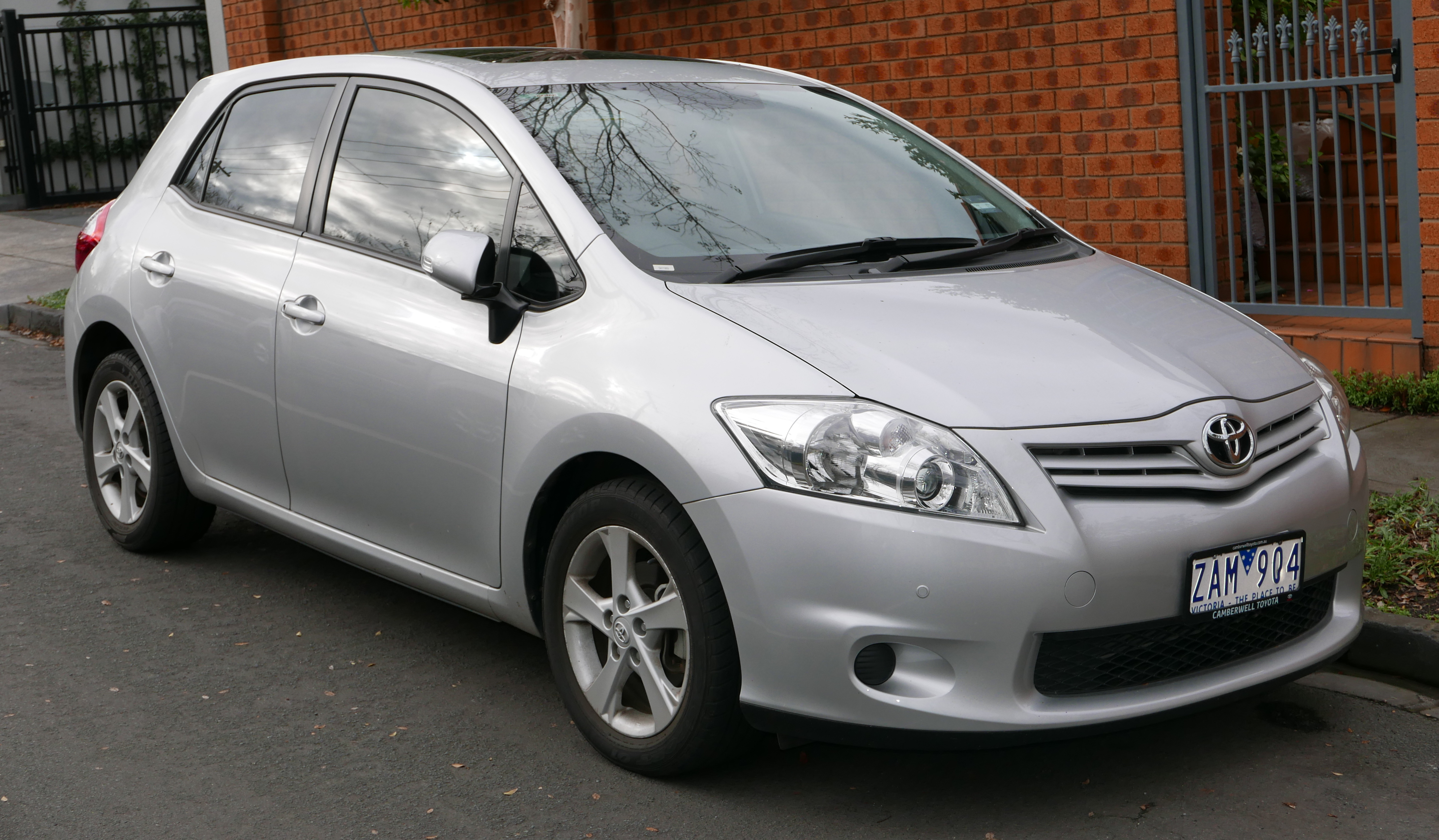
Facelift Corolla Conquest hatchback (ZRE152, Australia)

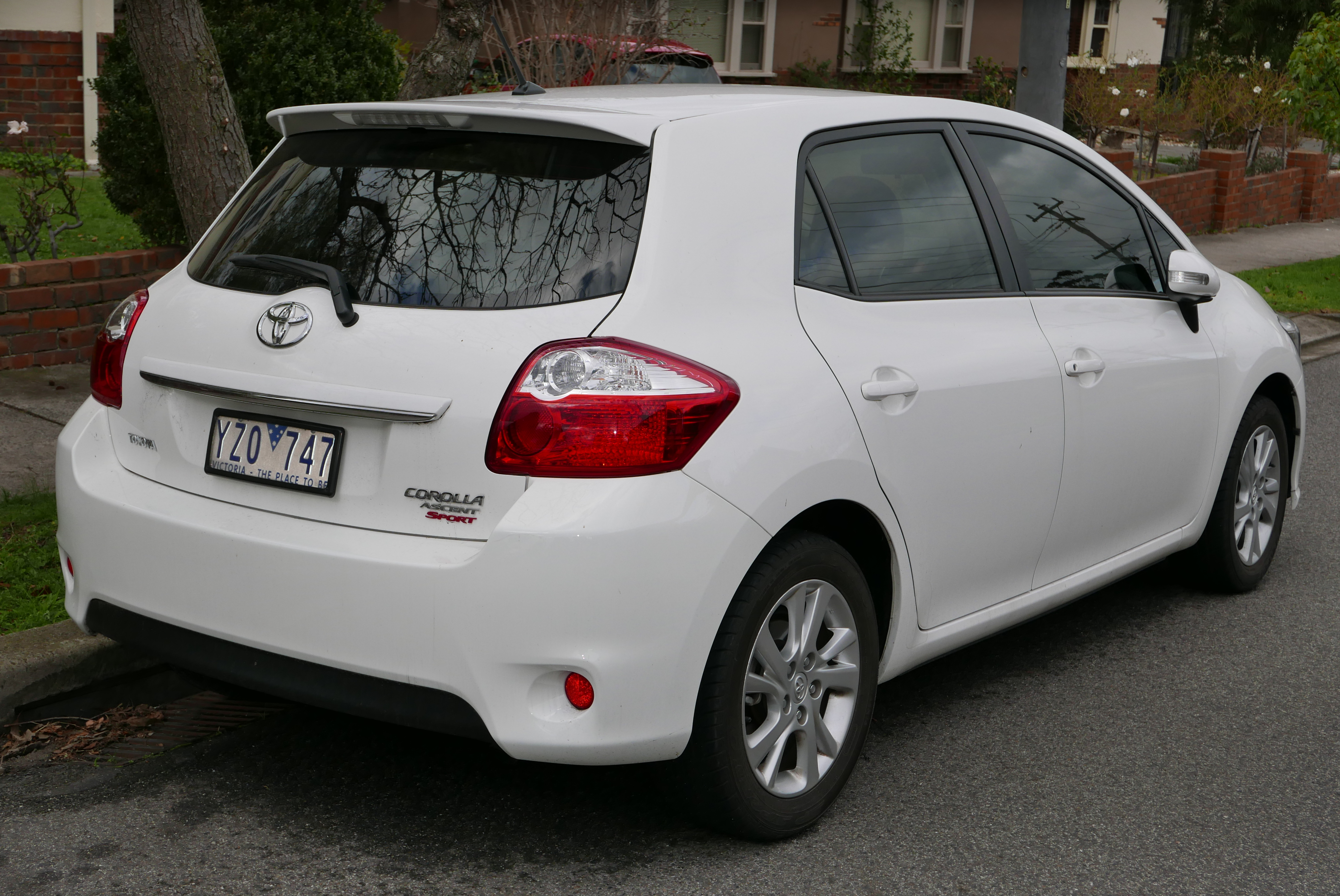
Facelift Corolla Ascent Sport hatchback (ZRE152, Australia)

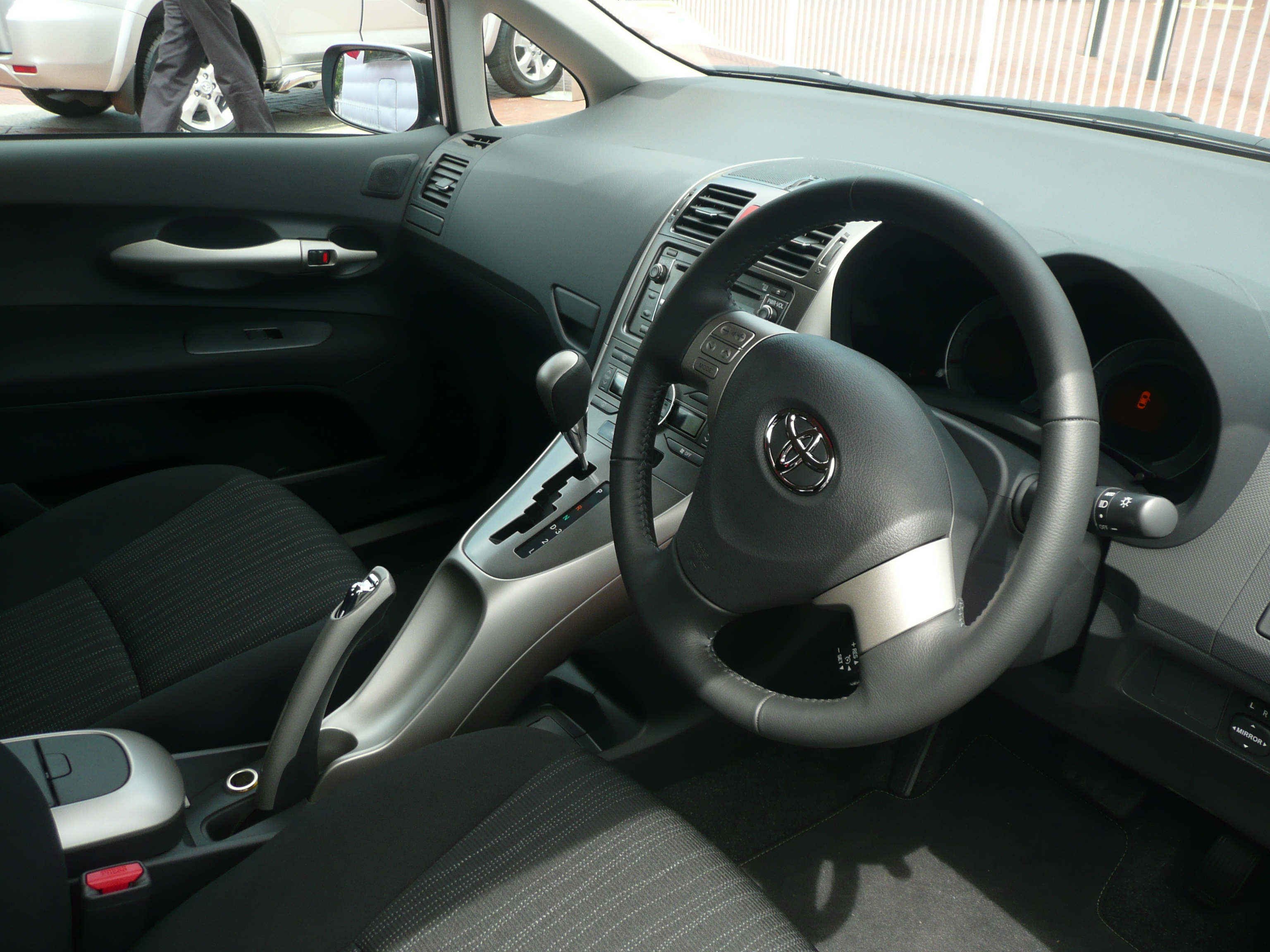
Interior (pre-facelift, Australia)

==== New Zealand ====
In New Zealand, the Auris was sold as "Corolla" hatchback. Grades were: base-model "GX", sports luxury "GLX". All models were powered by the 1.8-litre Petrol 2ZR-FE engine, with either a six speed manual or four speed automatic. GX models came with steel wheels and hubcaps, whilst GLX models came with alloys, front fog lights, leather bound steering wheel & shifter knob and cruise control. Diesel models were also available in a 1.4L and 2.0L D-4D both being a 6-speed manual only.

The New Zealand Corolla Hatchback, like Australia, received a facelift during the fourth quarter of 2009. The entire body design was given a sporty makeover. Major changes were made to the front and rear fascia, wheel designs and interior trims. Tail lights design was also changed.

A newer bumper design was also adapted with a special "diffuser" fitted at the bottom to give the rear a sportier look and on either side of the diffuser were reflectors which had not featured on any other previous Corolla Hatchback models. The front received new grille and revised headlamps.

Trim lines and options remained the same with both the GX and GLX models pre-facelifted versions.

==== Europe ====
The Auris was released on 1 February 2007 in the United Kingdom, replacing the E120 series Corolla hatchback. Toyota positioned the Auris at the lower medium segment to compete with cars such as Volkswagen Golf, Vauxhall/Opel Astra, Hyundai i30 and the Ford Focus. Trim levels were T2, T3 and T Spirit – followed by the T180 model in April 2007.

European trim levels were Terra, Strata, Luna, Sol, Premium and Prestige. In February 2007, Toyota announced an investment of £100 million in its Deeside engine factory to build a petrol engine for the Auris.

The Deeside plant would start building 1.33-litre Dual VVT-i engine beginning in 2009–10, and would also produce Auris engines previously built in Japan.

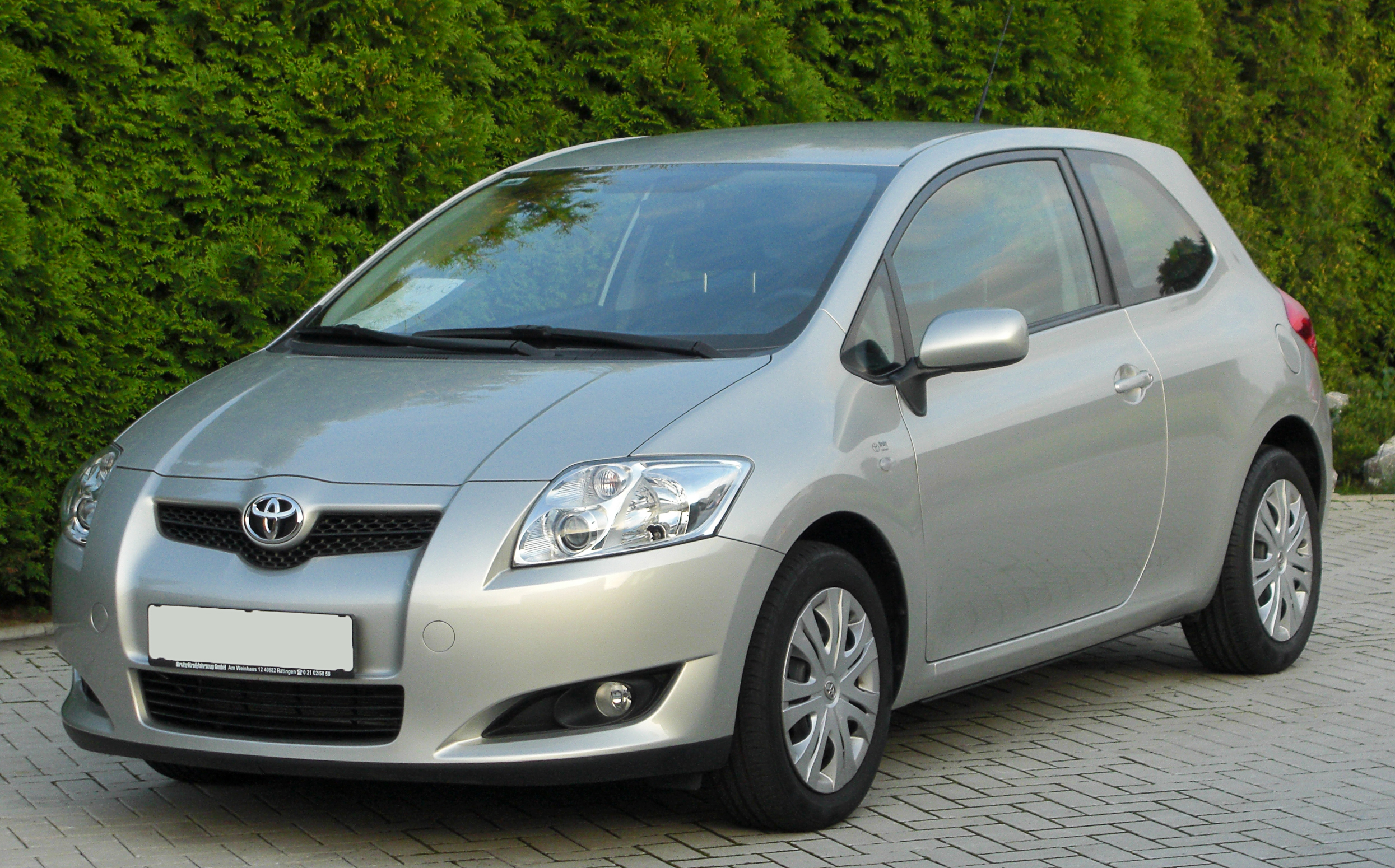
Pre-facelift Auris 1.6 Sol 3-door (ZRE151, Germany)

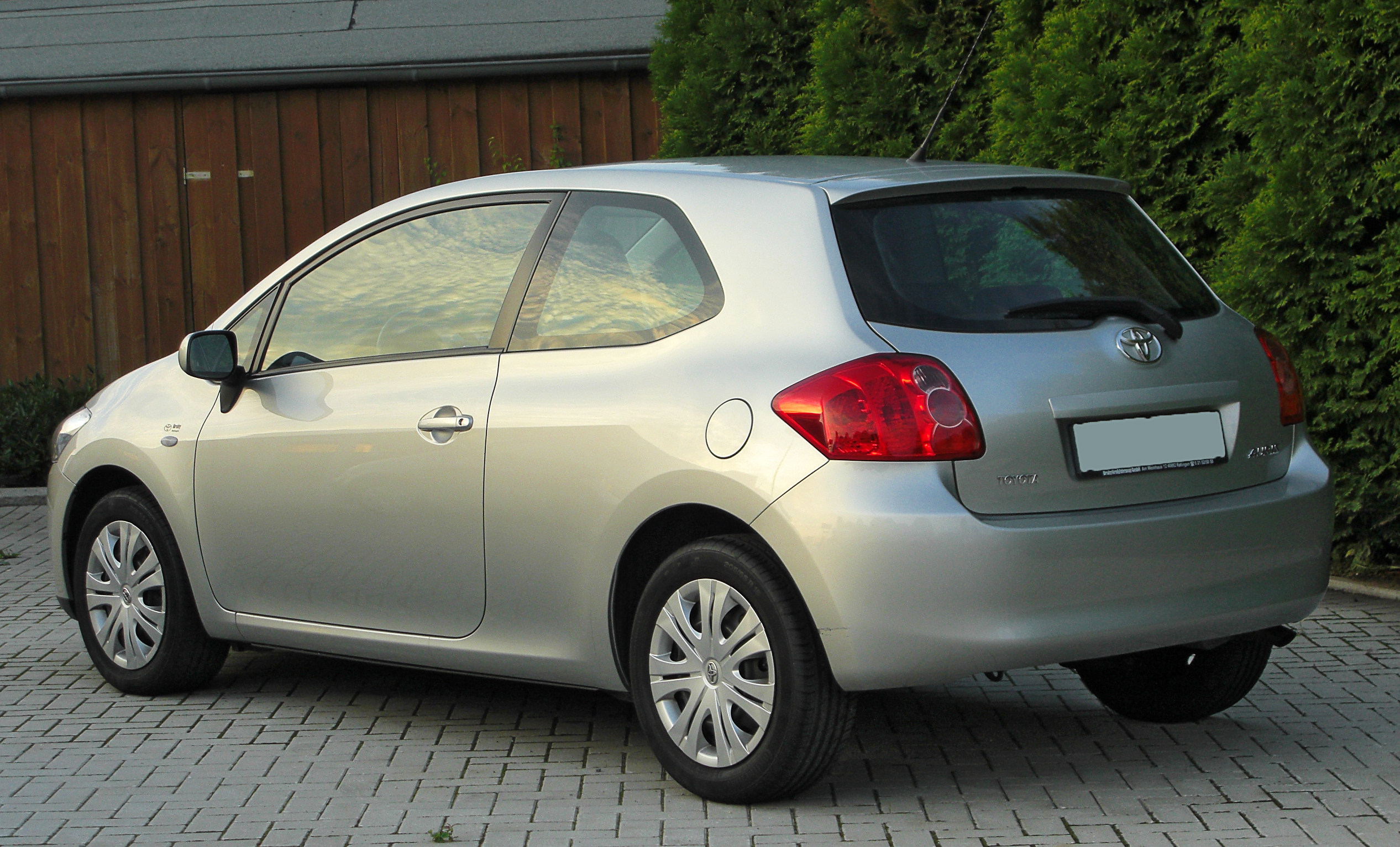
Pre-facelift Auris 1.6 Sol 3-door (ZRE151, Germany)

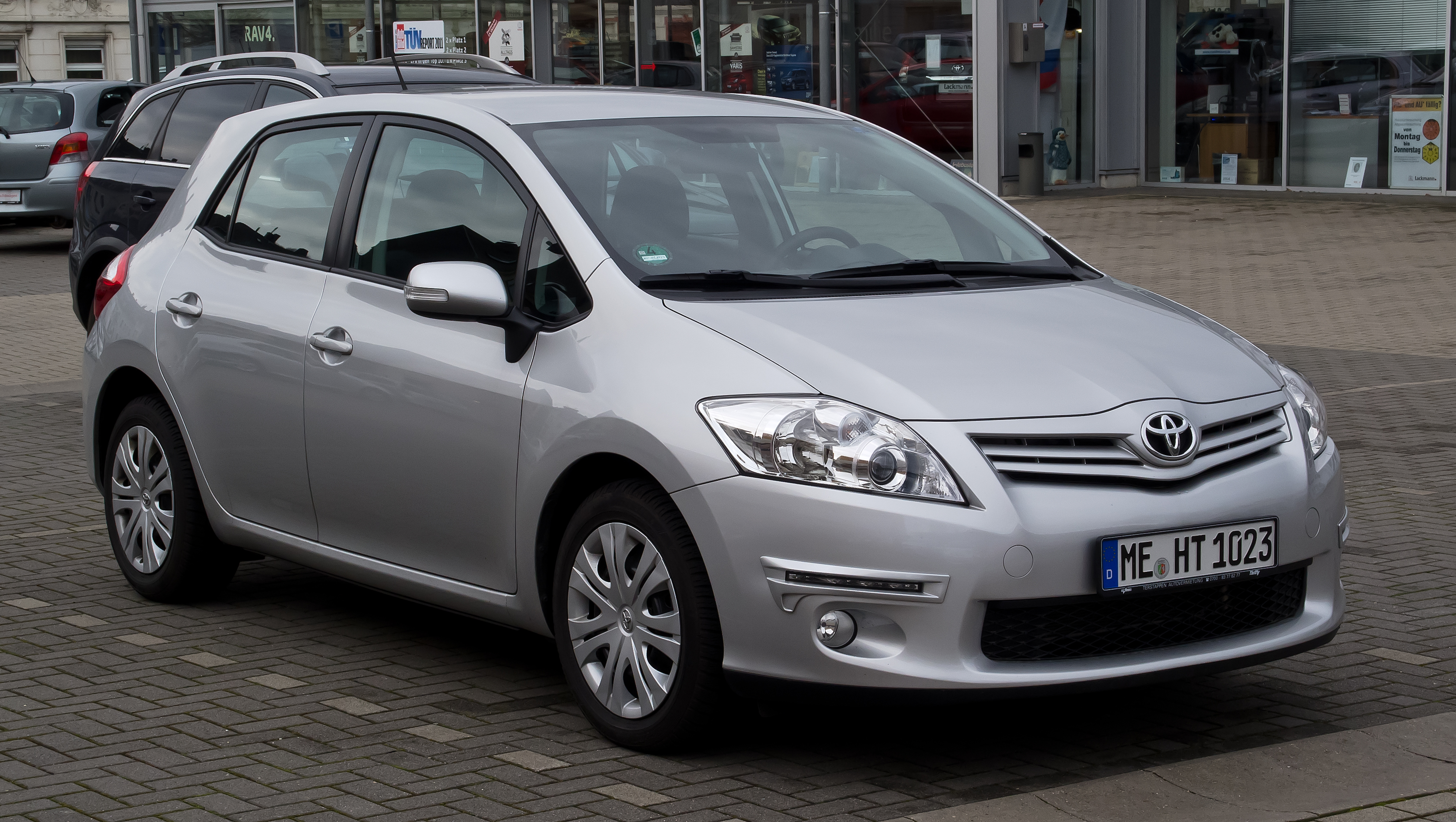
Auris 5-door (facelift; Germany)

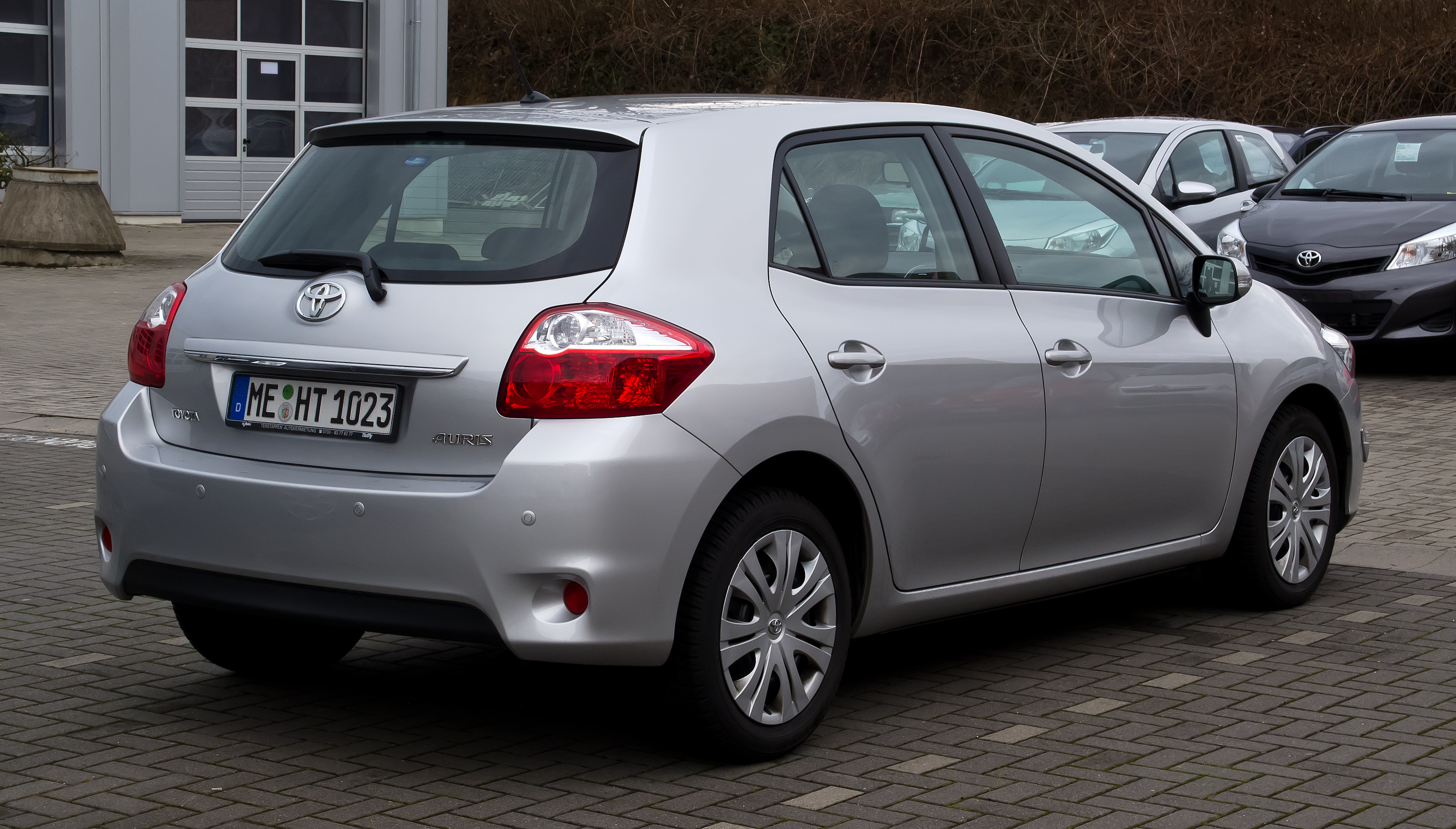
Auris 5-door (facelift; Germany)

Engines for the European Auris are:

Model	Years	Type/code	Power@rpm	torque@rpm
Petrol engines
1.33 Dual VVT-i	2008–2012	1,329 cc (81.1 cu in) I4 1NR-FE	101 PS (74 kW; 100 hp)@6000	132 N⋅m (97 lb⋅ft)@3800
1.4 VVT-i	2007–2008	1,398 cc (85.3 cu in) I4 4ZZ-FE	97 PS (71 kW; 96 hp)@6000	130 N⋅m (96 lb⋅ft)@4600
1.6 Dual VVT-i	2007–2009	1,598 cc (97.5 cu in) I4 1ZR-FE	124 PS (91 kW; 122 hp)@6000	157 N⋅m (116 lb⋅ft)@5200
1.6 Valvematic	2009–2012	1,598 cc (97.5 cu in) I4 1ZR-FAE	132 PS (97 kW; 130 hp)@6400	160 N⋅m (118 lbf⋅ft)@4400
1.8 Dual VVT-i	2007–2009	1,797 cc (109.7 cu in) I4 2ZR-FE	136 PS (100 kW; 134 hp)@6000	175 N⋅m (129 lb⋅ft)@4400
1.8 Valvematic	2009–2012	1,797 cc (109.7 cu in) I4 2ZR-FAE	147 PS (108 kW; 145 hp)@6400	180 N⋅m (133 lbf⋅ft)@4000
Diesel engines
1.4 D-4D	2007–2009	1,364 cc (83.2 cu in) I4 turbo 1ND-TV	90 PS (66 kW; 89 hp)@3800	190 N⋅m (140 lbf⋅ft)@1800–3000
1.4 D-4D	2009–2012	1,364 cc (83.2 cu in) I4 turbo 1ND-TV	90 PS (66 kW; 89 hp)@3800	205 N⋅m (151 lb⋅ft)@1800–3000
2.0 D-4D	2007–2009	1,998 cc (121.9 cu in) I4 turbo 1AD-FTV	126 PS (93 kW; 124 hp)@3600	300 N⋅m (221 lbf⋅ft)@1800
2.0 D-4D	2009–2012	1,998 cc (121.9 cu in) I4 turbo 1AD-FTV	126 PS (93 kW; 124 hp)@3600	310 N⋅m (229 lbf⋅ft)@1800–2400
2.2 D-CAT	2007–2009	2,231 cc (136.1 cu in) I4 turbo 2AD-FHV	177 PS (130 kW; 175 hp)@3600	400 N⋅m (295 lbf⋅ft)@2000–2600
2.2 D-CAT	2009–2012	2,231 cc (136.1 cu in) I4 turbo 2AD-FHV	177 PS (130 kW; 175 hp)@3600	400 N⋅m (295 lbf⋅ft)@2000–2800

"Toyota Optimal Drive" engines were introduced in 2008; this was what Toyota called their program of improving efficiency and lowering emissions without losing power. The 1NR-FE 1.33 Dual VVT-i engine featured Toyota's first Stop & Start system sold in Europe, and replaced the 1.4 VVT-i engine. The 2.0 D-4D engine added a diesel particulate filter. A 1.6 Valvematic replaced the 1.6 Dual VVT-i engine.

Model	Years	Type
Petrol engines
1.33 Dual VVT-i	2008–2012	6-speed manual
1.4 VVT-i	2007–2008	5-speed manual
1.6 Dual VVT-i	2007–2009	5-speed manual, MultiMode
1.6 Valvematic	2009–2012	6-speed manual, MultiMode
1.8 Dual VVT-i	2007–2009	6-speed manual
1.8 Valvematic	2009–2012	6-speed manual
Diesel engines
1.4 D-4D	2007–2009	5-speed manual
1.4 D-4D	2009–2012	6-speed manual, MultiMode
2.0 D-4D	2007–2009	6-speed manual
2.0 D-4D	2009–2012	6-speed manual
2.2 D-CAT	2007–2009	6-speed manual
2.2 D-CAT	2009–2012	6-speed manual

=== Auris Hybrid ===
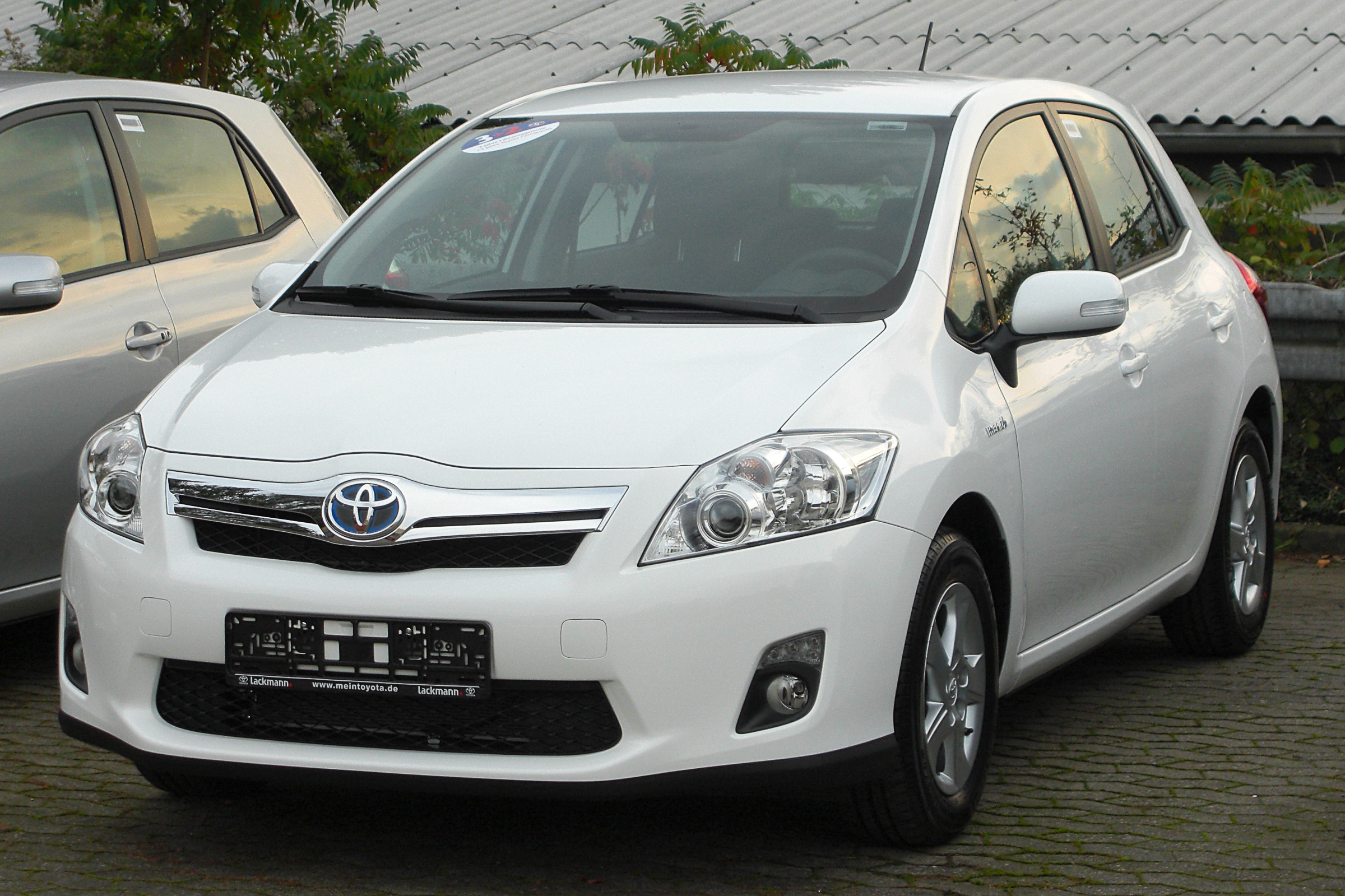
Auris 1.8 Hybrid (ZWE150, Germany)

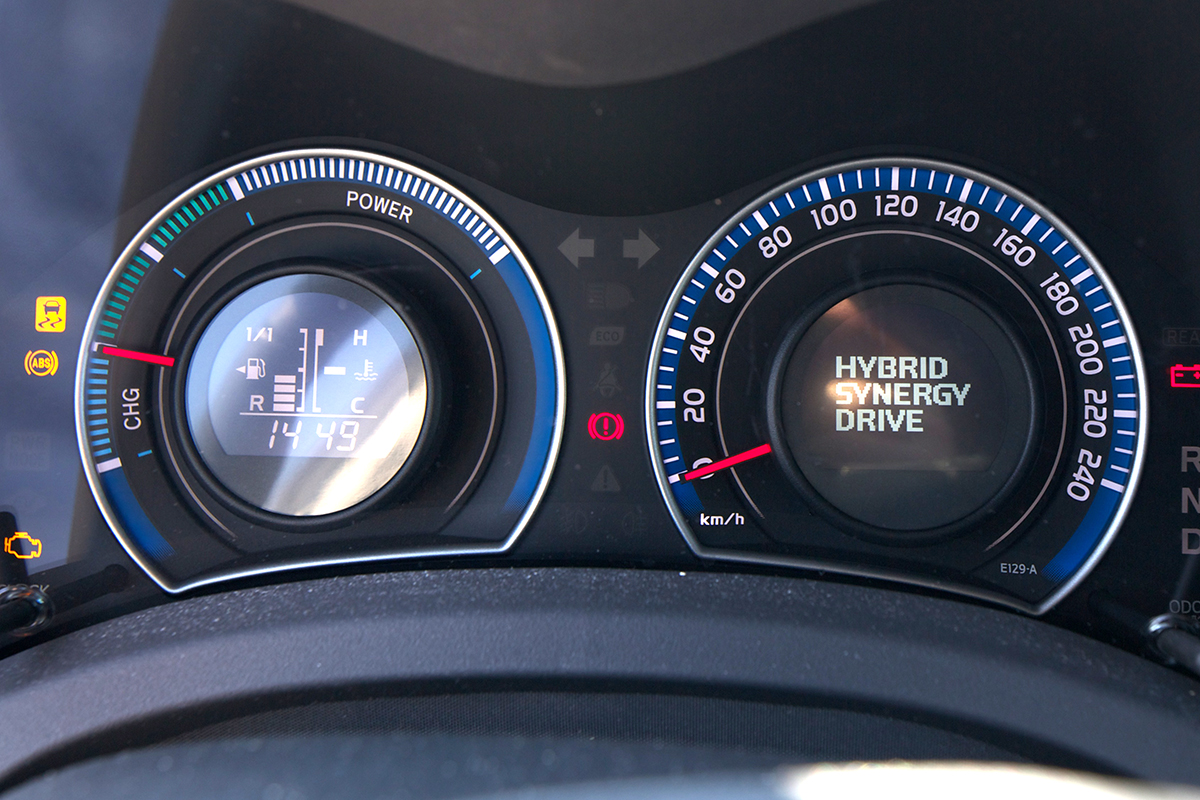
Instrument cluster

The Auris HSD Full Hybrid Concept was unveiled at the September 2009 Frankfurt Motor Show. The concept version included Hybrid Synergy Drive technology, 18-inch alloy wheels with low rolling resistance tyres, a larger, more efficient rear spoiler, 20 mm lower ride height, seats and upper dashboard with blue Gaucholino leather upholstery, instrument cluster with hybrid blue illumination, solar panel roof with ventilation.

On 17 July 2009, Toyota announced the production of hybrid Auris by Toyota Manufacturing UK (TMUK) beginning in 2010. It is equipped with engines produced at TMUK's Deeside Plant and produced at TMUK's Burnaston Plant.

The production version of the Auris Hybrid was presented at the March 2010 Geneva Motor Show. Mass production began in May 2010 at Toyota Manufacturing UK (TMUK) Burnaston plant and became the first mass-produced hybrid vehicle to be built in Europe. Sales in the United Kingdom began on 1 July 2010, at a price starting at £18,950 (US$27,450), £550 (US$800) less than the Toyota Prius.

The Auris Hybrid shares the same powertrain and batteries as the Prius. Combined fuel economy is 74.3 mpg_{‑imp} (3.80 L/100 km; 61.9 mpg_{‑US}). Carbon dioxide emissions (CO_{2}) are 89 g/km on the standard test cycle which allows the model to be exempted from paying Vehicle Excise Duty (for cars registered prior to 1 April 2017) and the London congestion charge. In July 2010, the Auris Hybrid was selected as "WhatGreenCar Car of the Year 2010" by magazine What Car?.

In 2010, Toyota sold 15,237 Auris Hybrids in Europe, and 32,725 in 2011.

=== Toyota Blade ===
The upscale sibling of the Auris is called the Blade. It replaced the Toyota Allex, which, in turn, was the replacement for the Toyota Sprinter. The Blade was sold at Japanese Toyota dealerships Toyota Store and Toyopet Store locations, while the Auris was exclusive to Toyota Corolla Store and Toyota NETZ Store locations. It has different front and rear sheetmetal, and is powered by Toyota's 2.4-litre 2AZ-FE engine. All 2.4-litre models have CVT automatic gearboxes.

In August 2007, Toyota released the Blade Master, an upgraded trim of the Blade which features Toyota's 280 PS (206 kW), 3.5-litre 2GR-FE V6 engine, larger brakes, and an upgraded suspension. Toyota discontinued the Blade in April 2012, ahead of the replacement of the Auris, without a direct successor.

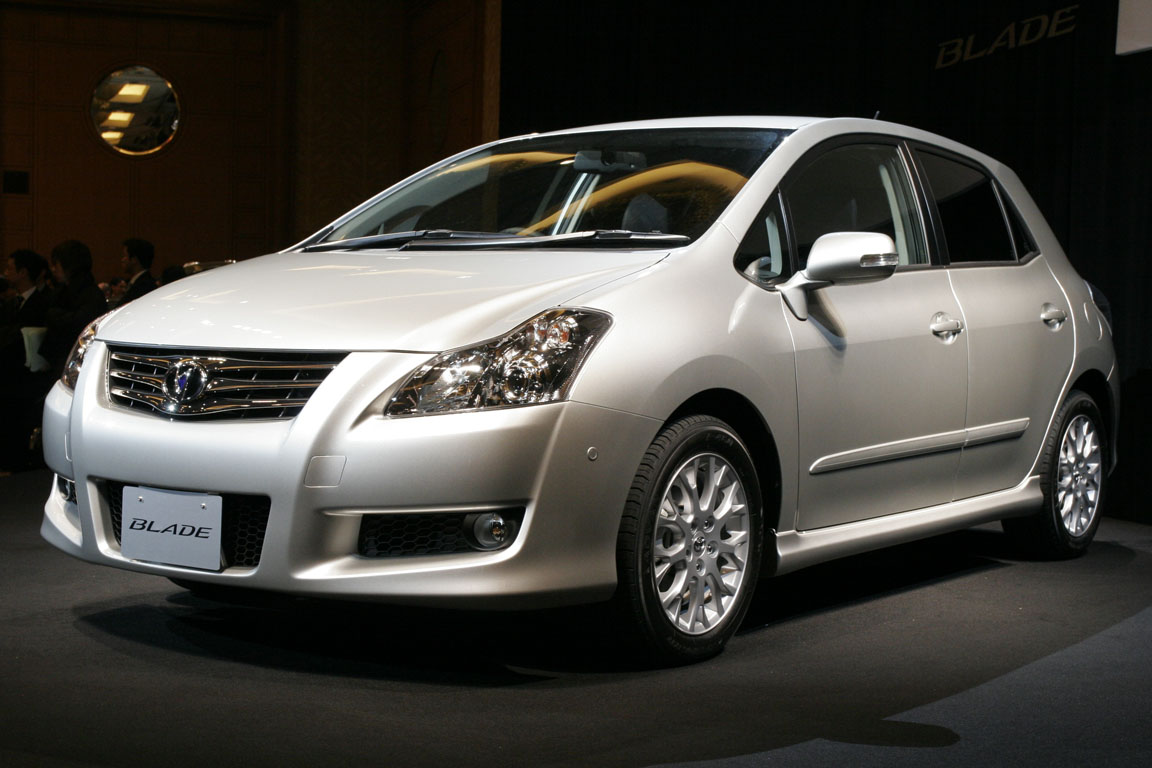
Toyota Blade 2.4 (AZE156H)

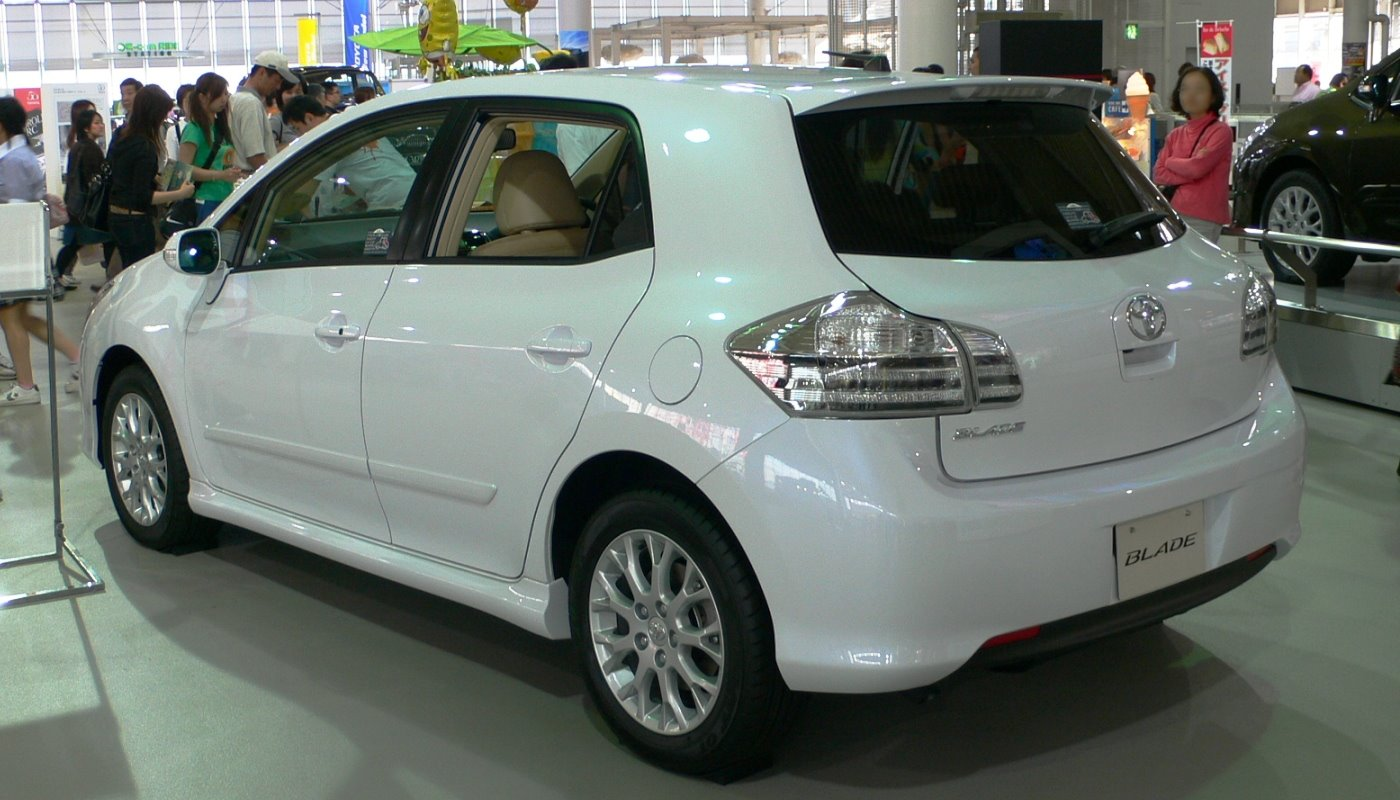
Toyota Blade 2.4 (AZE156H)

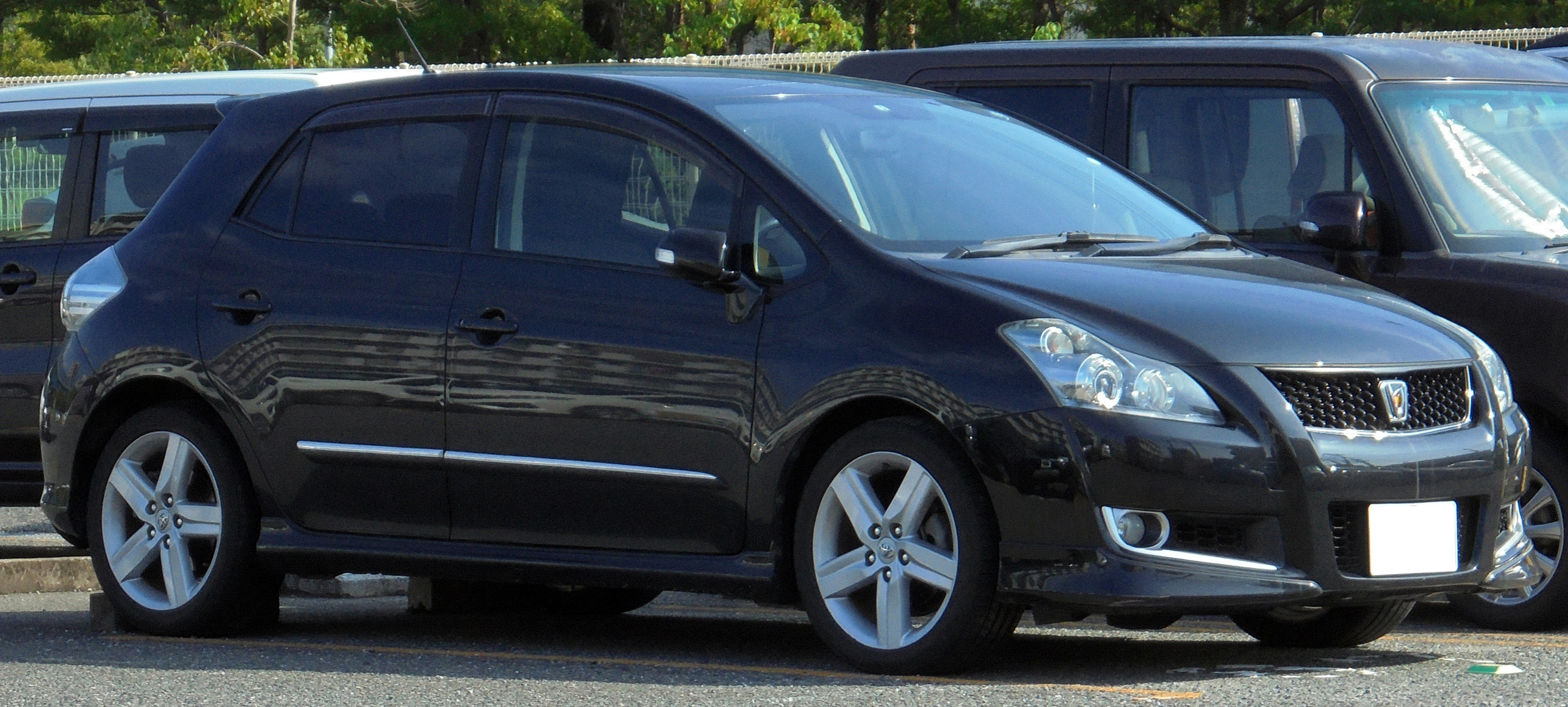
2009–2012 Toyota Blade Master G 3.5 (GRE156H)

=== Safety ===
Euro NCAP test results Toyota Auris (2006)
Test	Score	Rating
Adult occupant:	35	5 /5 stars
Child occupant:	37	4 /5 stars
Pedestrian:	21	3 /4 stars

ANCAP test results Toyota Corolla 5 door hatches with side and curtain airbags (2007)
Test	Score
Overall	5 /5 stars
Frontal offset	14.96/16
Side impact	16/16
Pole	2/2
Seat belt reminders	2/3
Whiplash protection	Not Assessed
Pedestrian protection	Marginal
Electronic stability control	Not Available

ANCAP test results Toyota Corolla variants with dual frontal airbags (2008)
Test	Score
Overall	4 /5 stars
Frontal offset	12.01/16
Side impact	14.84/16
Pole	Not Assessed
Seat belt reminders	2/3
Whiplash protection	Not Assessed
Pedestrian protection	Adequate
Electronic stability control	Not Available

ANCAP test results Toyota Corolla all hatch variants (2011)
Test	Score
Overall	5 /5 stars
Frontal offset	14.96/16
Side impact	16/16
Pole	2/2
Seat belt reminders	2/3
Whiplash protection	Good
Pedestrian protection	Adequate
Electronic stability control	Standard

== Second generation (E180; 2012) ==
Second generation (E180)
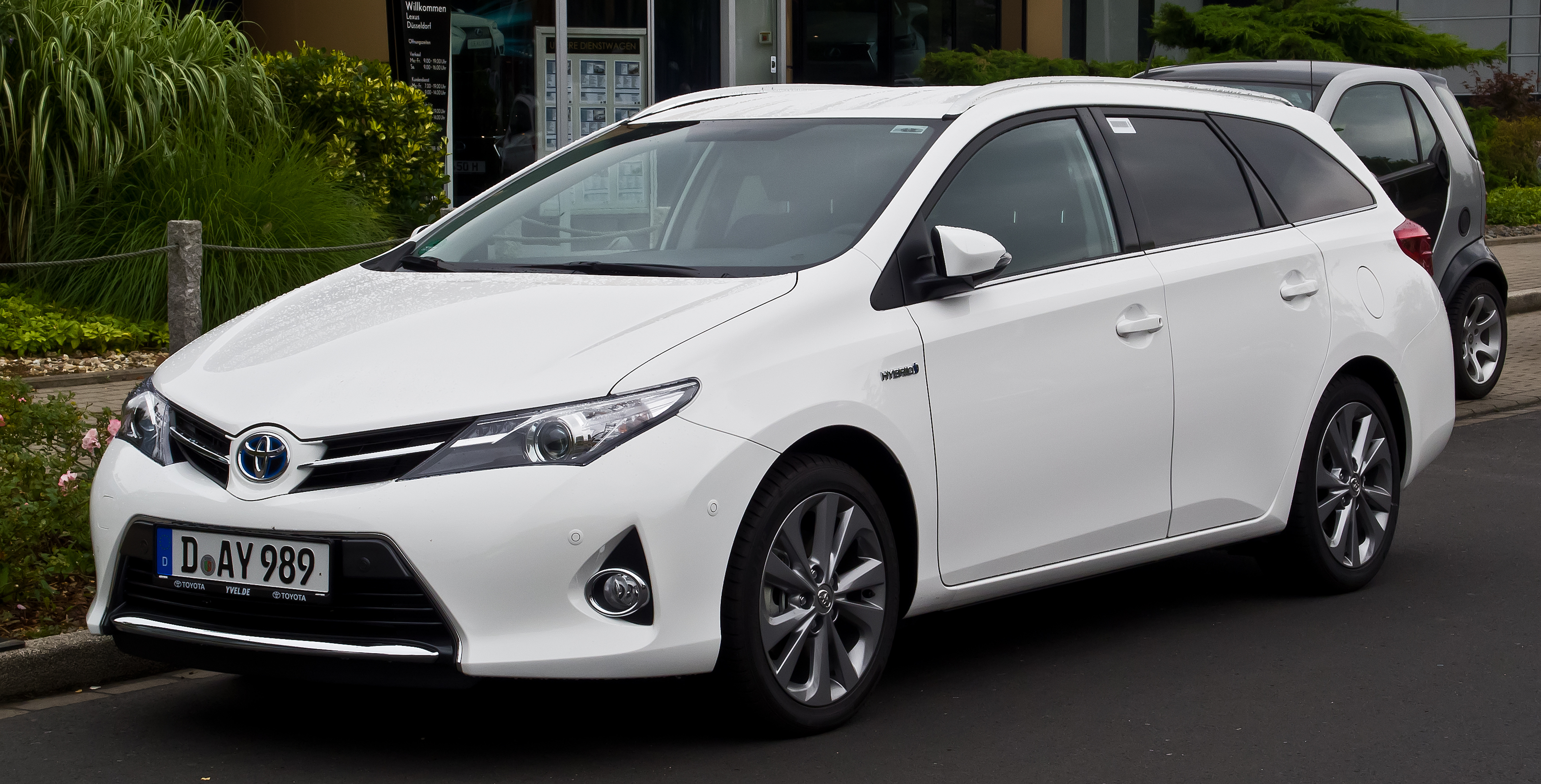
- Pre-facelift Auris Touring Sports 1.8 Hybrid Executive (ZWE186, Germany)

Overview
- Also called: Toyota Corolla (Australasia); Scion iM (November 2014 – August 2016); Toyota Corolla iM (August 2016 – 2018)
- Production: August 2012 – December 2018
- Model years: 2016–2018 (North America)
- Assembly: Japan: Toyota, Aichi (Takaoka plant); United Kingdom: Burnaston (TMUK)
- Designer: Koichi Suga (2010)

Body and chassis
- Body style: 5-door hatchback; 5-door estate car; 5-door panel van (Ireland)
- Platform: Toyota New MC platform
- Related: Toyota Corolla (E170); Lexus CT

Powertrain
- Engine: Petrol: 1196 cc 8NR-FTS VVT-iW turbo I4; 1329 cc 1NR-FE I4; 1496 cc 1NZ-FE I4; 1598 cc 1ZR-FAE V-matic I4; 1797 cc 2ZR-FAE V-matic I4; Diesel: 1364 cc 1ND-TV I4; 1598 cc 1WW I4; 1998 cc 1AD-FTV I4; Hybrid: 1798 cc 2ZR-FXE VVT-i petrol with an electric motor
- Transmission: 4-speed automatic; 5-speed MultiMode; 5/6-speed manual; CVT

Dimensions
- Wheelbase: 2,600 mm (102.4 in)
- Length: 4,275 mm (168.3 in) (2012–2015); 4,330 mm (170.5 in) (2015–2018); 4,560 mm (179.5 in) (Touring Sports, 2012–2015); 4,595 mm (180.9 in) (Touring Sports, 2015–2018)
- Width: 1,760 mm (69.3 in)
- Height: 1,460 mm (57.5 in) (2012–2015); 1,475 mm (58.1 in) (2015–2018; Touring Sports, 2012–2015); 1,485 mm (58.5 in) (Touring Sports, 2015–2018)
- Kerb weight: 1,190–1,480 kg (2,624–3,263 lb)

Chronology
- Predecessor: Toyota Matrix (North America); Toyota Corolla Rumion (Japan); Scion xB (North America)

The second generation Auris was revealed on 20 August 2012 and went on sale in Japan on the same day. It features a wider, lower stance with a more luxurious interior. Its dashboard was later used on the E170 series Corolla saloon that was released later in 2013.

The European market Auris was first shown at the 2012 Paris Motor Show, with European sales starting in early 2013. It went on sale in Australia and New Zealand in October 2012, as the Corolla Hatchback. In some parts of Asia, the sales of the new Auris was sold from the second quarter of 2013.

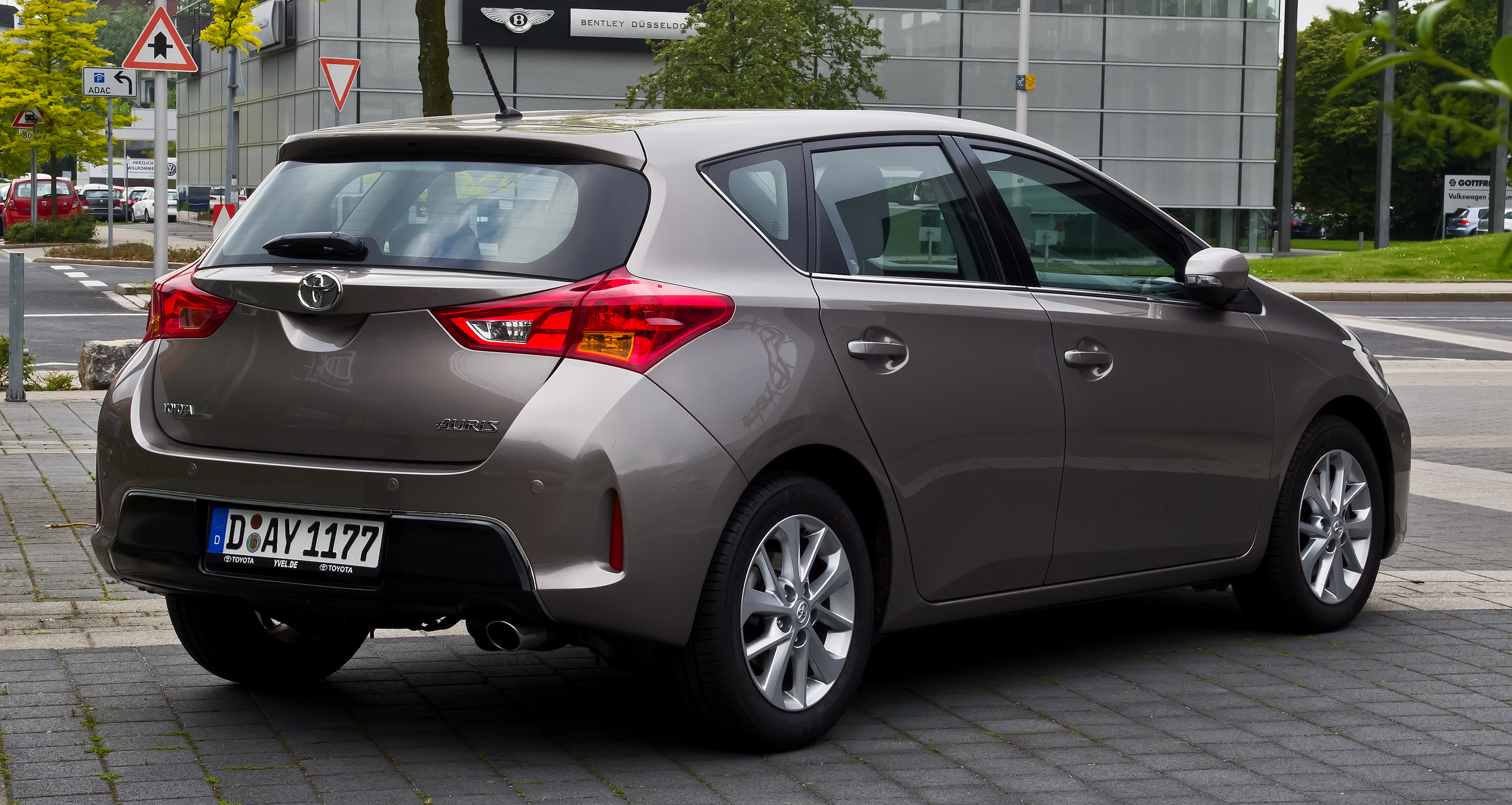
Pre-facelift Auris Hatchback 2.0 D-4D Executive (ADE180, Germany)

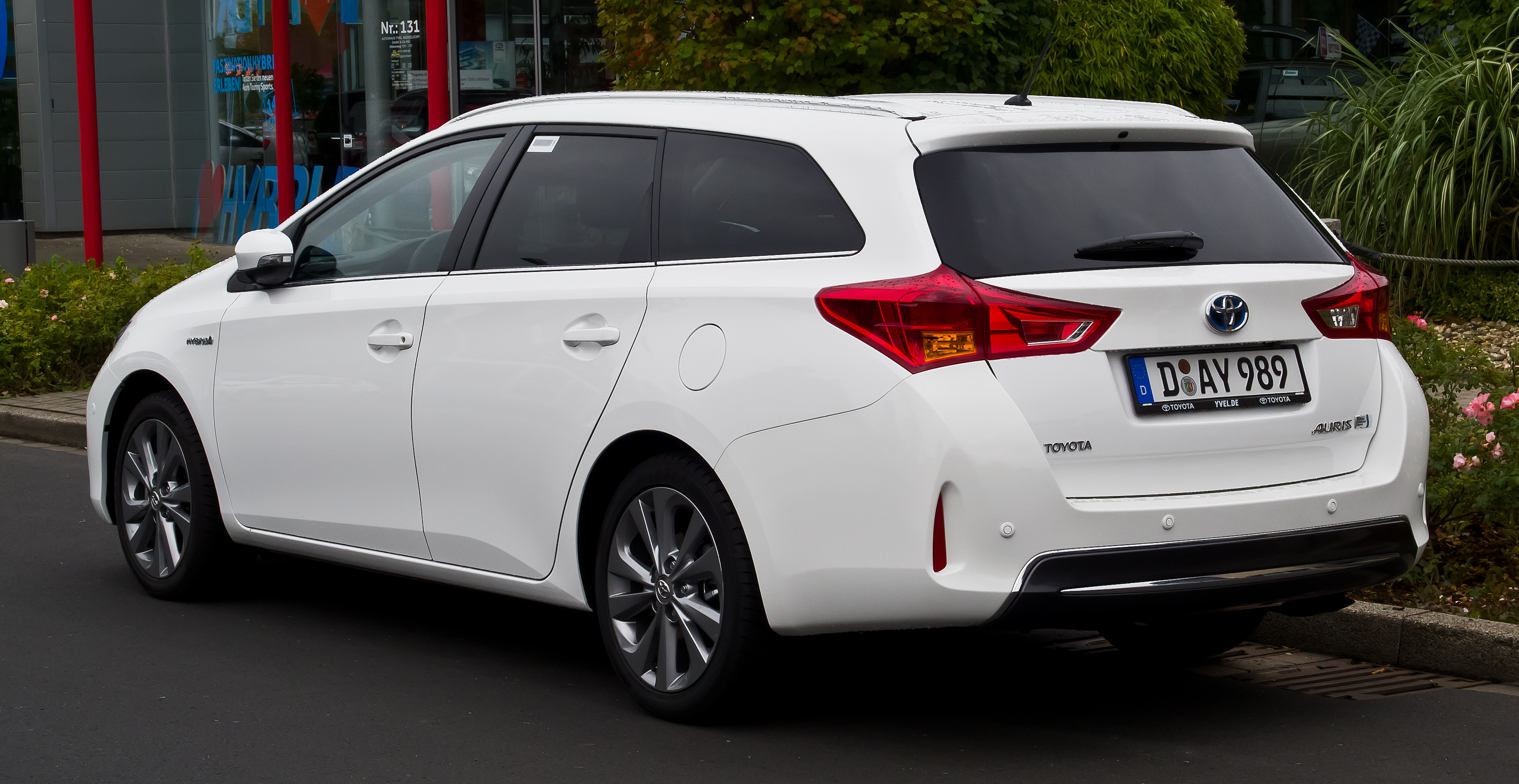
Pre-facelift Auris Touring Sports 1.8 Hybrid Executive (ZWE186, Germany)

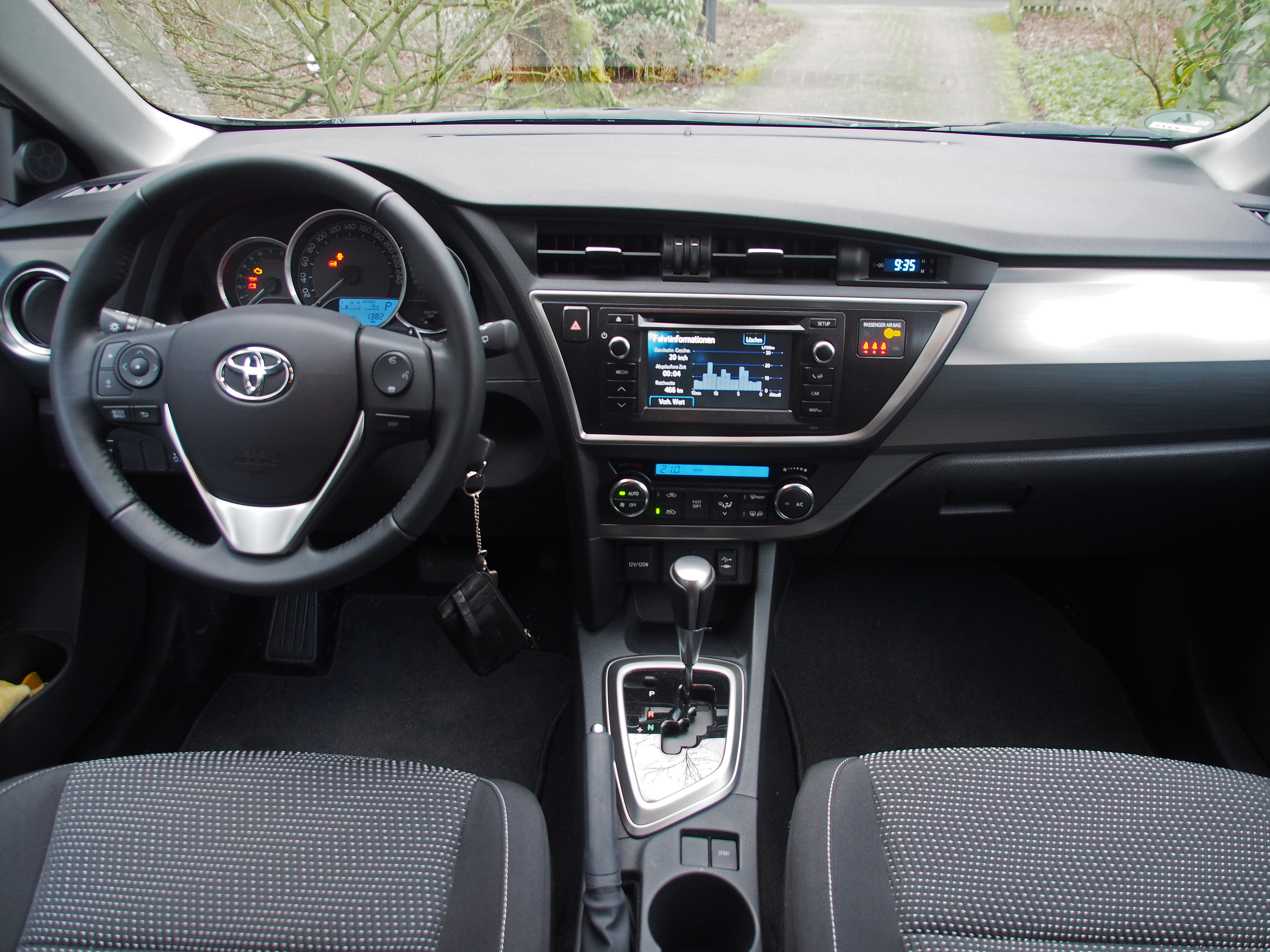
Interior

=== Touring Sports (estate car) ===
Toyota unveiled a world premiere at the 2012 Paris Motor Show of the Auris in a new estate car variant, which is 285 mm longer than the five-door hatchback. It also represents the first model in its segment to be offered with a full hybrid powertrain.

The wheelbase is kept to 2600 mm just like its five-door twin however its profile of the estate version is different, with the steeply raked windscreen flowing into the extended roofline. The estate is 285 mm longer, providing more loadspace.

The rear bumper and the tailgate has a different styling, while the sill is set to be 80 mm lower than it is on its hatchback twin. The engine lineup is carried over from the hatchback, including 1.33-litre Dual VVT-i and 1.6-litre Valvematic petrol units, plus a 1.4-litre D-4D diesel. A hybrid is also sold with a 1.8-litre VVT-i petrol engine and an electric motor, providing a maximum output of 136 HP (100 kW), enough for a 0–62 mph (0–100 km/h) sprint in 10.9 seconds and a top speed of 180 km/h (112 mph).

=== Facelift ===
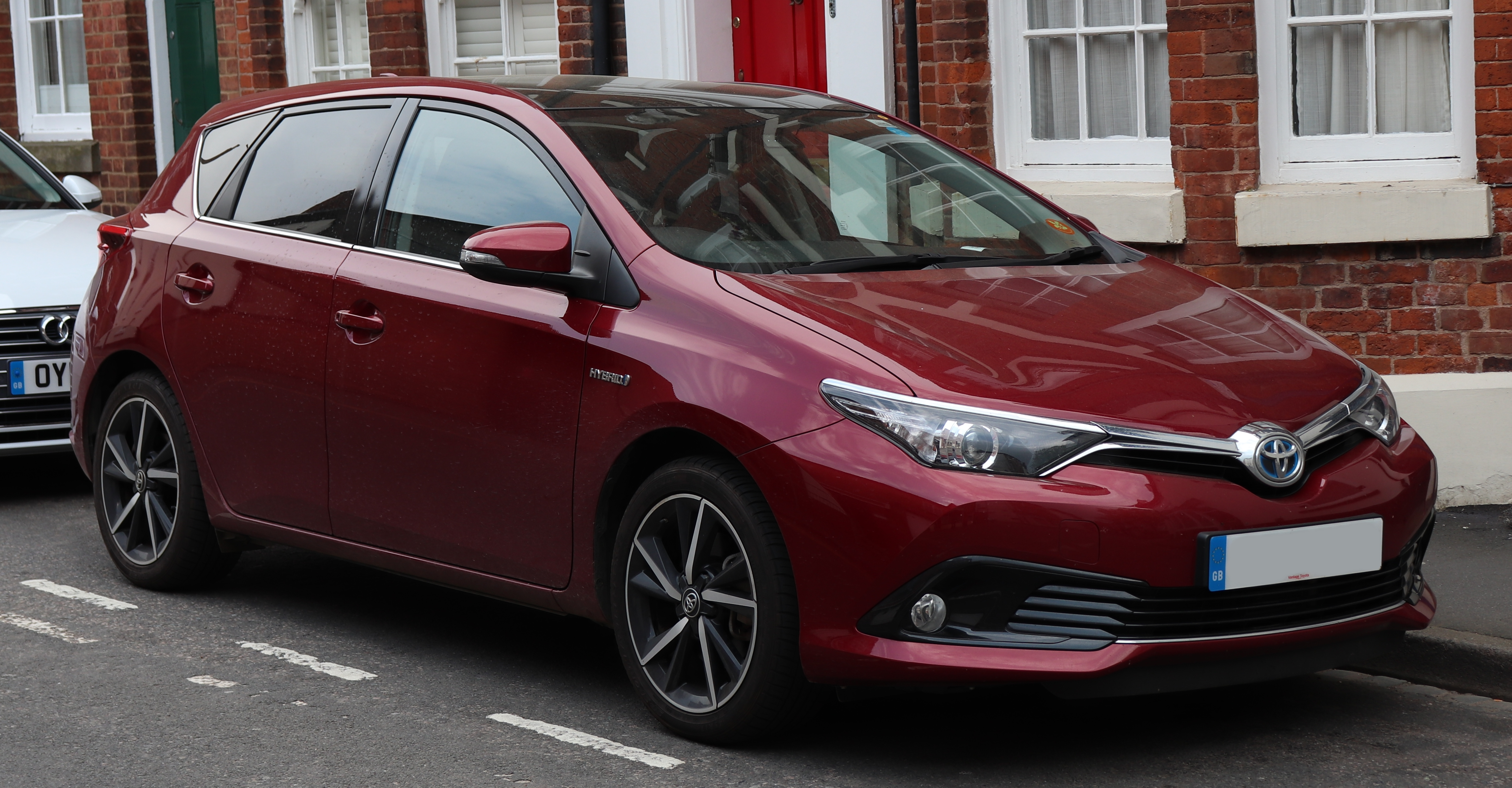
Facelift Auris 1.8 Hybrid Design hatchback (ZWE186, UK)

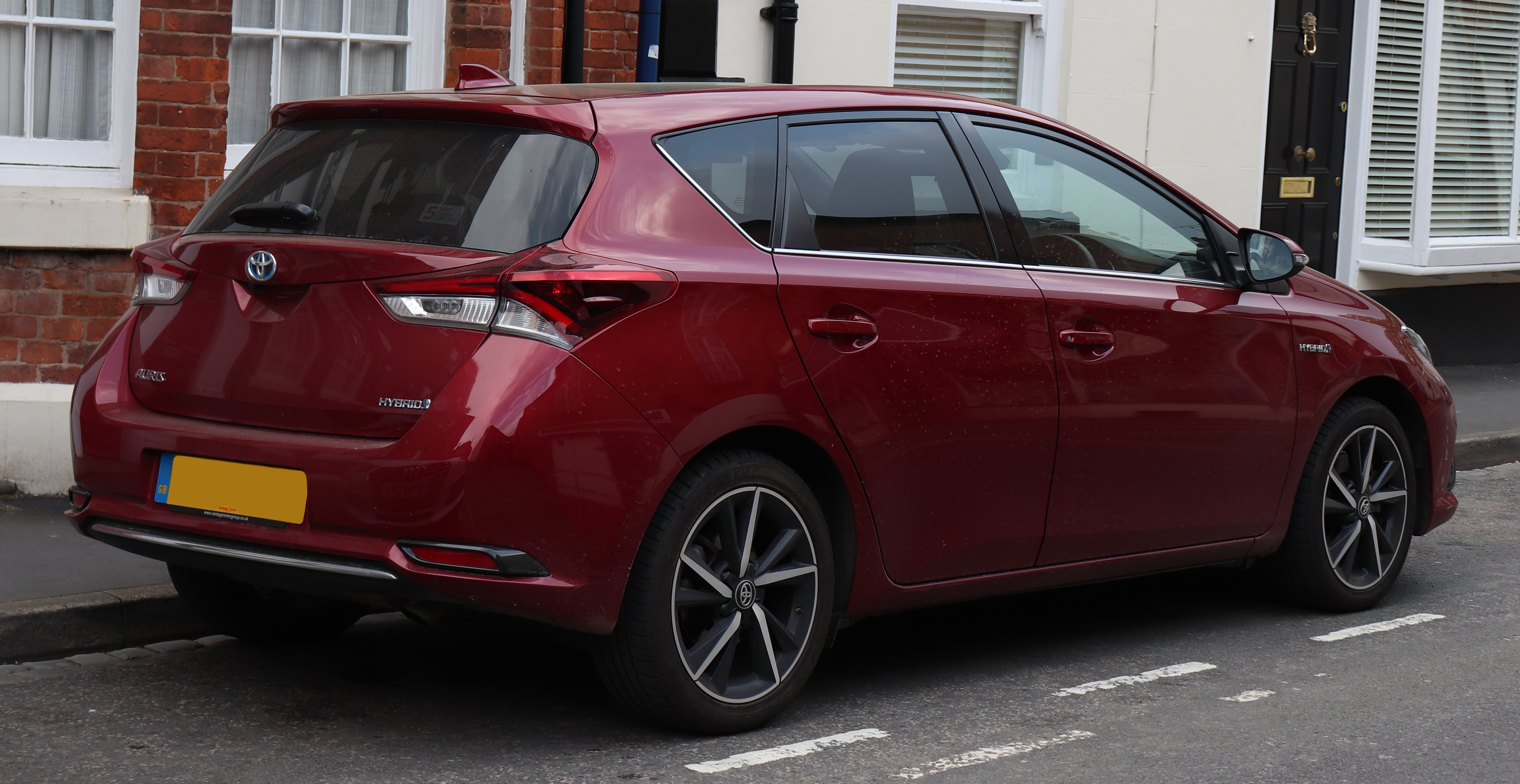
Facelift Auris 1.8 Hybrid Design hatchback (ZWE186, UK)

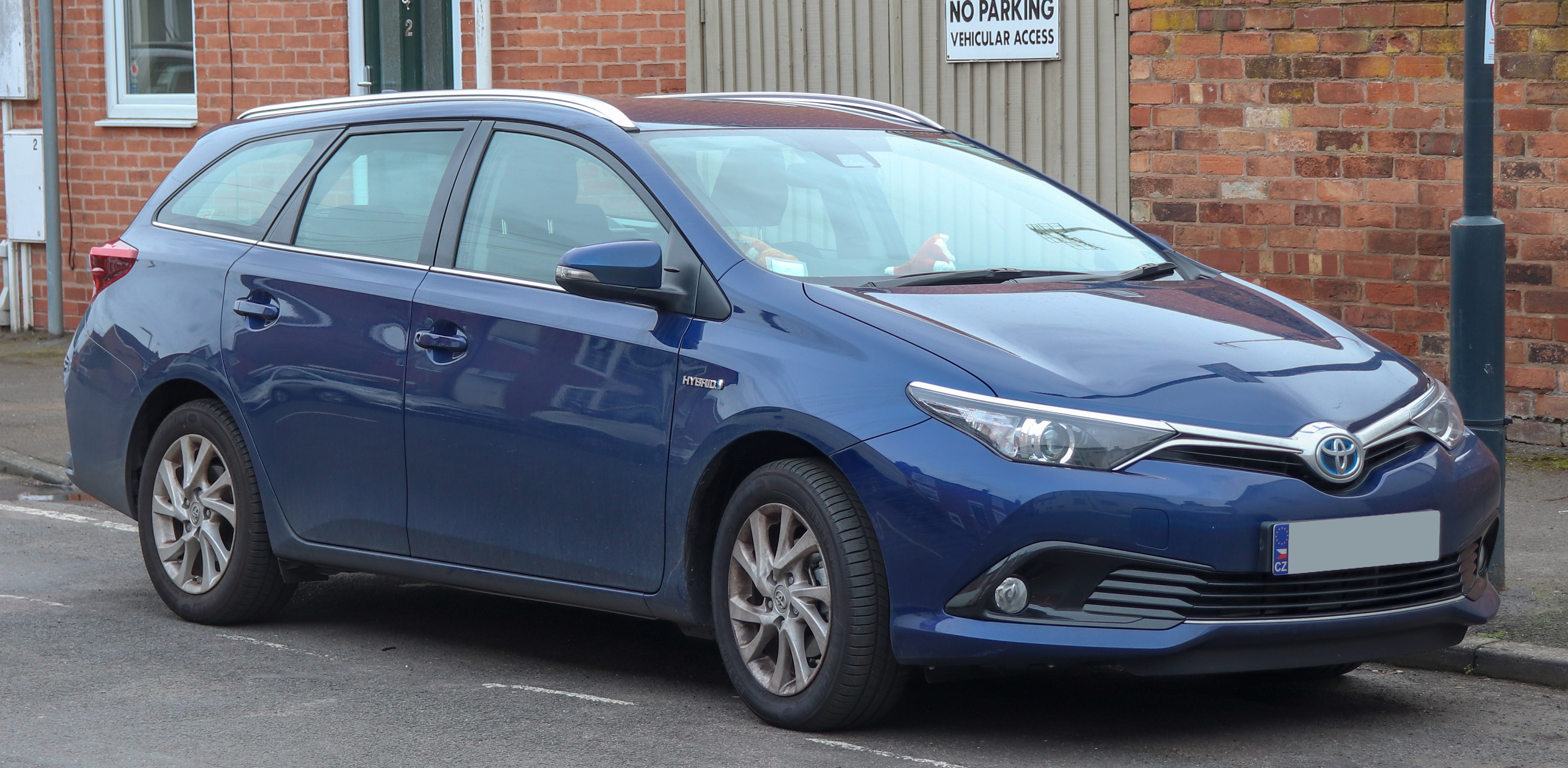
Facelift Auris 1.8 HEV Icon Tech Estate (ZWE186, UK)

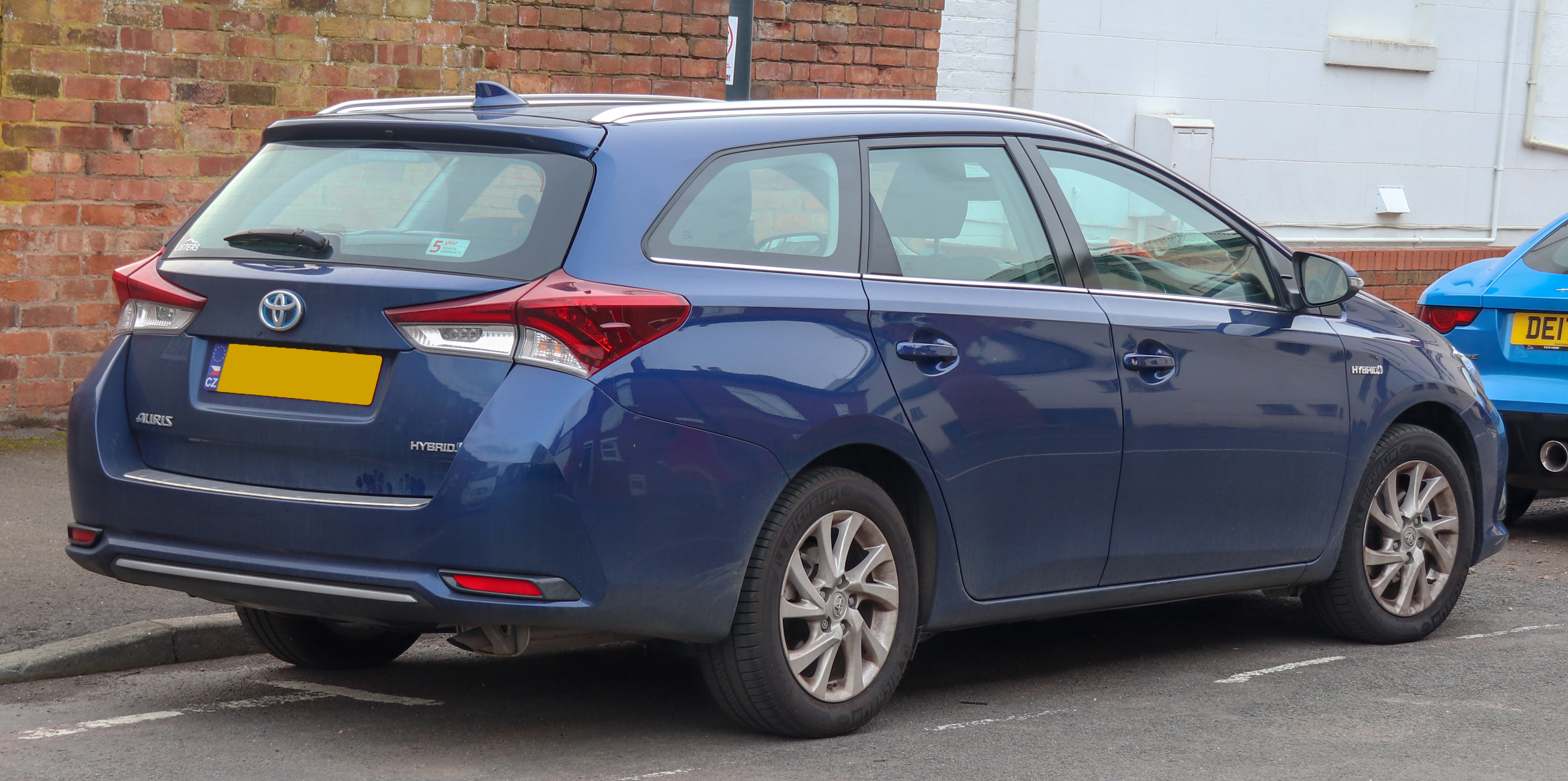
Facelift Auris 1.8 HEV Icon Tech Estate (ZWE186, UK)

=== Markets ===
==== Japan ====
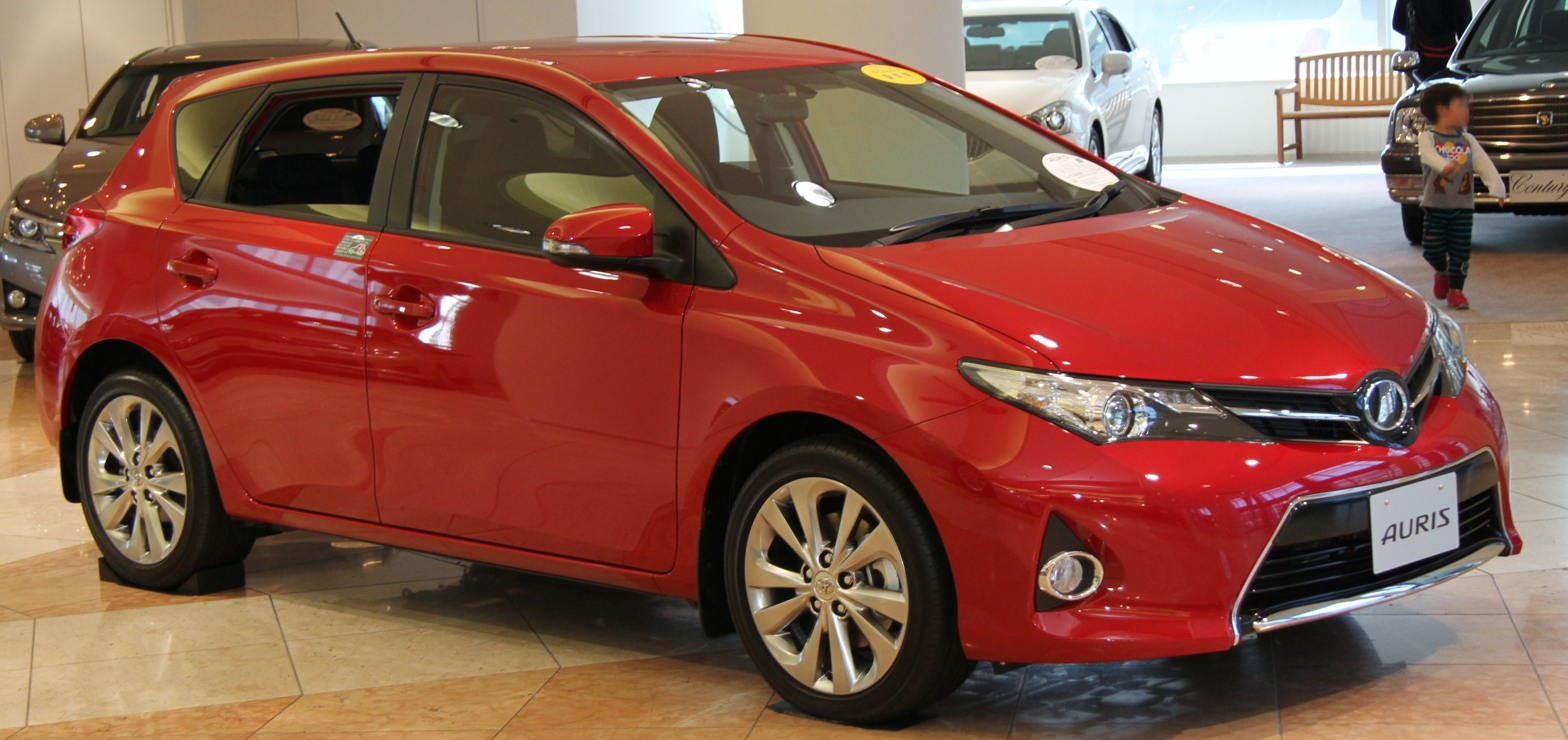
Auris 1.8 RS "S Package" (ZRE186, Japan)

For the Japanese market, the Auris is available with either 1.2-litre turbocharged 8NR-FTS, 1.5-litre 1NZ-FE or 1.8-litre 2ZR-FAE engine. The smaller motor is installed in the base model 150X. Front-wheel drive and full-time 4WD are offered. The more powerful engine is reserved for the more luxurious 180S and sporty RS models. The 180S comes only with CVT, while the sole transmission for the RS is six-speed manual. All cars with 1.8-litre engine are front-wheel-drive.

In August 2013, Toyota in Japan launched an advertising campaign for the Auris, featuring Char Aznable from the Mobile Suit Gundam series. As part of the collaboration, Toyota unveiled a one off "MS-186H-CA" Auris that takes styling cues from the anime.

The facelift model went on sale in Japan on 6 April 2015, while the Hybrid model went on sale on 18 April 2016. When the sales of the Hybrid model began, the Netz logo emblem on the front grille was replaced by the Toyota logo emblem, and it began to be sold at Toyopet Store dealerships. The Auris was discontinued there on 20 March 2018.

Model	Years	Type/code	Power at rpm	Torque at rpm
120T 2WD	2012–2018	1,196 cc (73.0 cu in) 8NR-FTS	116 PS (85 kW; 114 hp) at 5200–5600	185 N⋅m (136 lb⋅ft) at 1500–4000
150X 2WD	2012–2018	1,496 cc (91.3 cu in) 1NZ-FE	108 PS (79 kW; 107 hp) at 6000	135 N⋅m (100 lb⋅ft) at 4400
150X 4WD	2012–2018	1,496 cc (91.3 cu in) 1NZ-FE	105 PS (77 kW; 104 hp) at 6000	135 N⋅m (100 lb⋅ft) at 4800
180S 2WD	2012–2018	1,797 cc (109.7 cu in) 2ZR-FAE	143 PS (105 kW; 141 hp) at 6200	173 N⋅m (128 lb⋅ft) at 4000
RS 2WD	2012–2018	1,797 cc (109.7 cu in) 2ZR-FAE	144 PS (106 kW; 142 hp) at 6200	180 N⋅m (133 lbf⋅ft) at 3800

==== Australia and New Zealand ====
In Australia, the Auris continued to be called the Corolla Hatchback. Model grades are Ascent, Ascent Sport, Levin SX and Levin ZR. All models are motored by 1.8-litre engine matched to six-speed manual or CVT gearbox. The Levin sport models have front sports seats, carbon fibre-like interior trim and 17-inch alloys. Panoramic roof is available for the top-of-the-line Levin ZR.

Meanwhile, for the New Zealand market the GX and GLX are the equivalent of Ascent and Ascent Sport. Manual transmission is only for the base GX. The GLX, as well as the sporty Levin SX and ZR come with CVT only.

Based on the Ascent hatchback, the limited edition Corolla RZ was released in 2014. It has black alloys, special decals, and upgraded interior.

The facelift model Corolla hatchback is introduced in mid-2015 with new front fascia and restyled tail lights. The Levin moniker was dropped from the sporty models, which are now simply called Corolla SX and ZR. The SX and ZR have sporty front bumper and lower body kits which distinguish them from the Ascent and Ascent Sport. The ZR is only offered with CVT.

The Hybrid model based on the Ascent Sport was released on 14 June 2016.

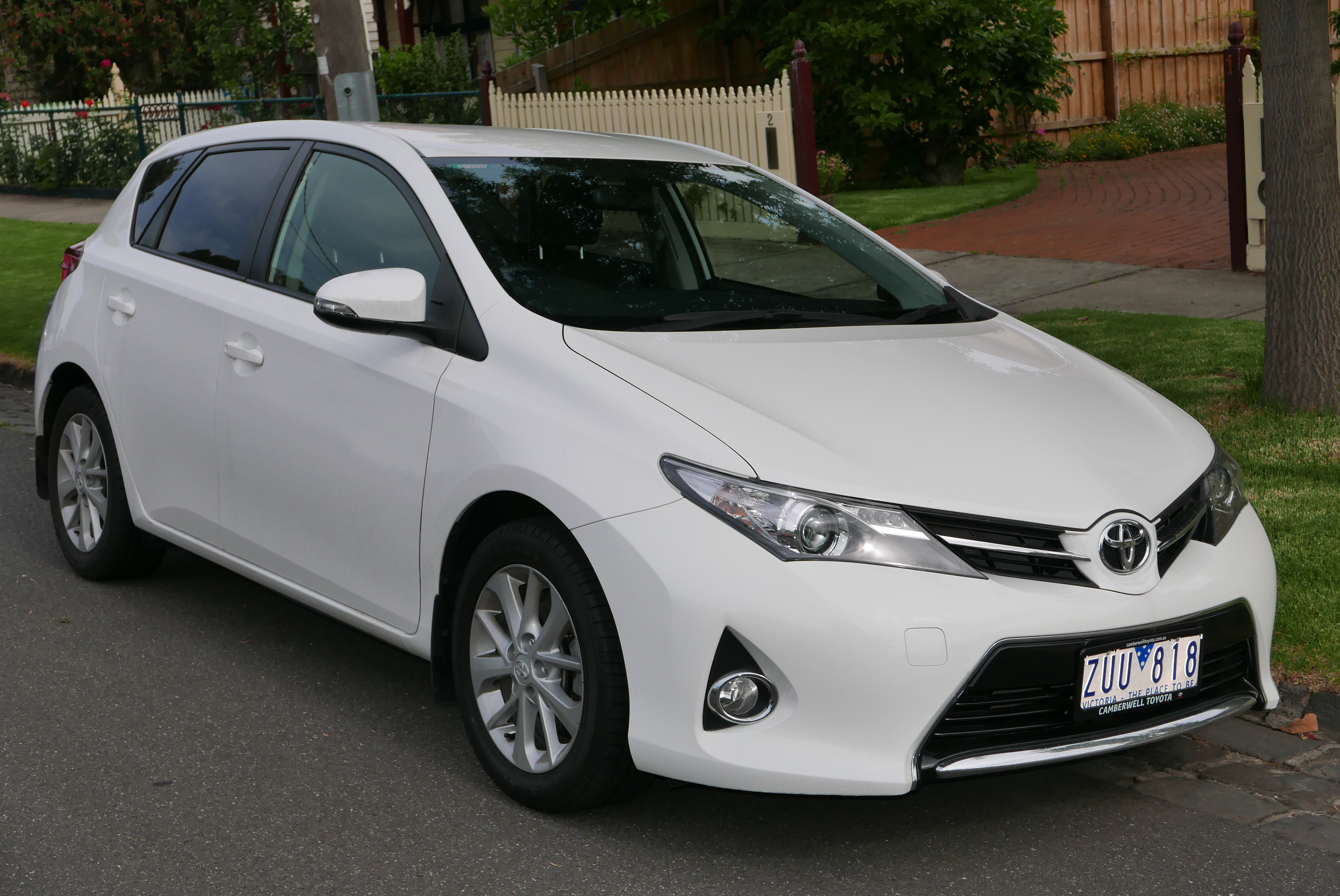
Pre-facelift Corolla Ascent Sport Hatchback (ZRE182, Australia)

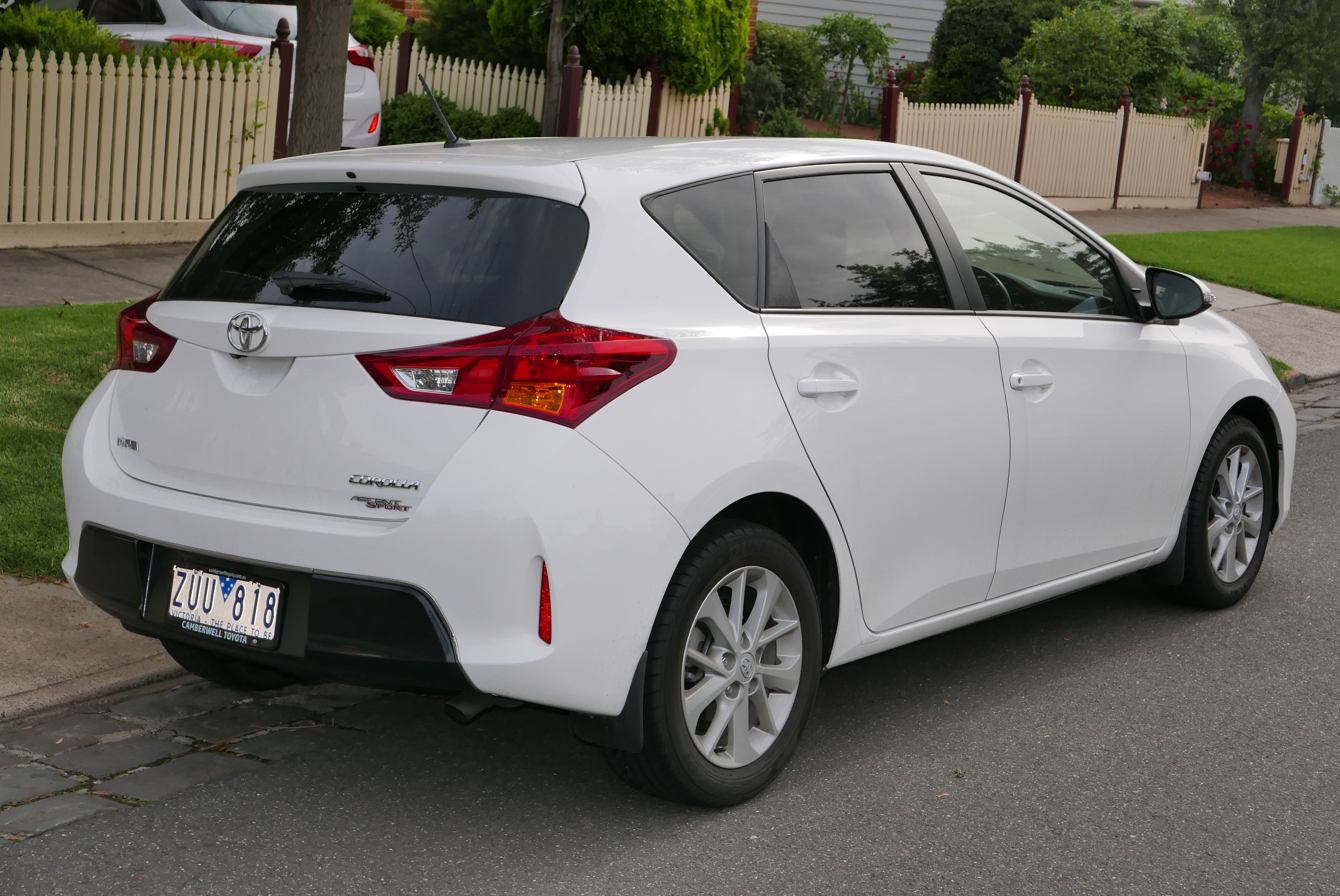
Pre-facelift Corolla Ascent Sport Hatchback (ZRE182, Australia)

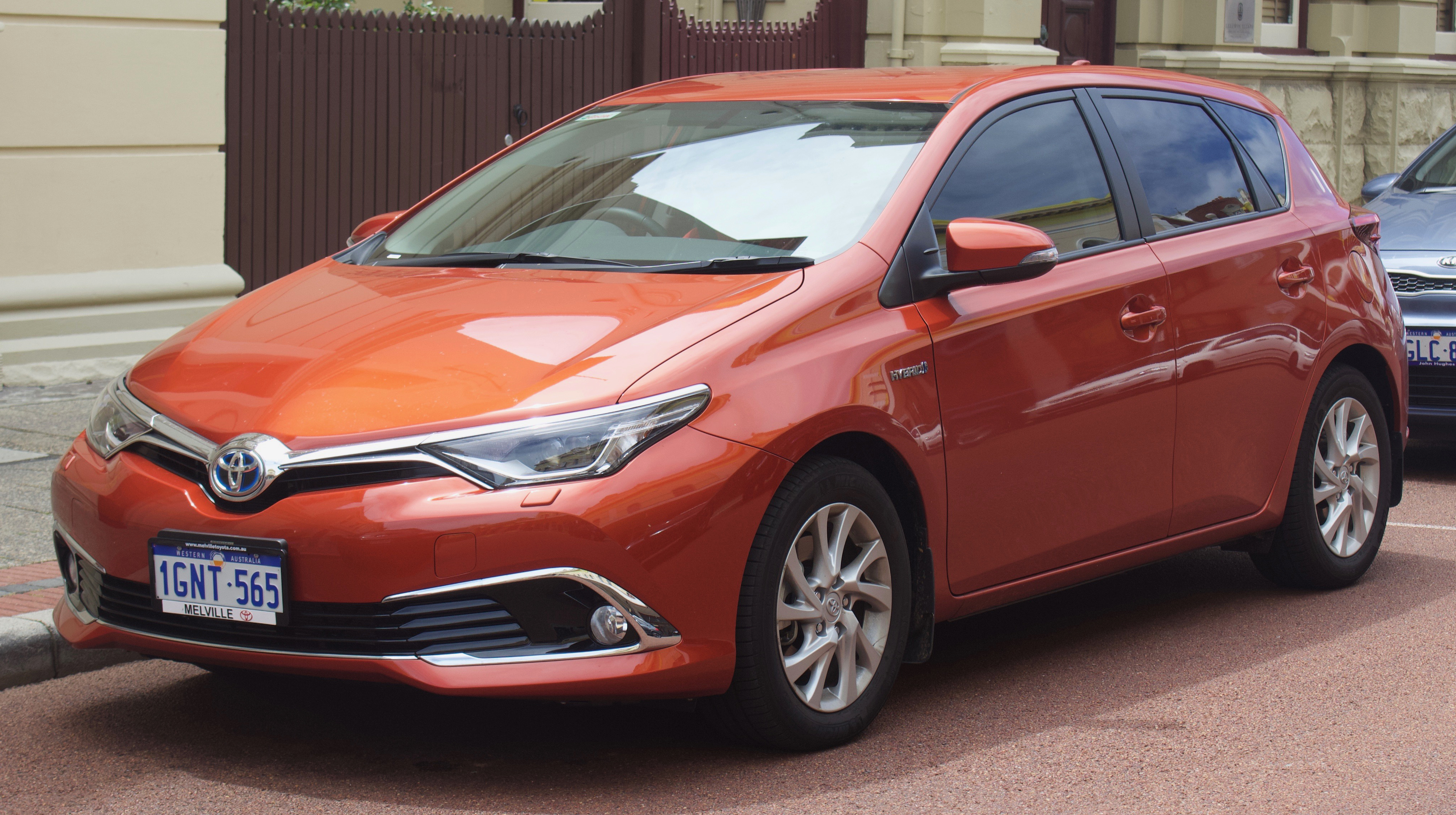
Facelift Corolla Hybrid (ZWE186, Australia)

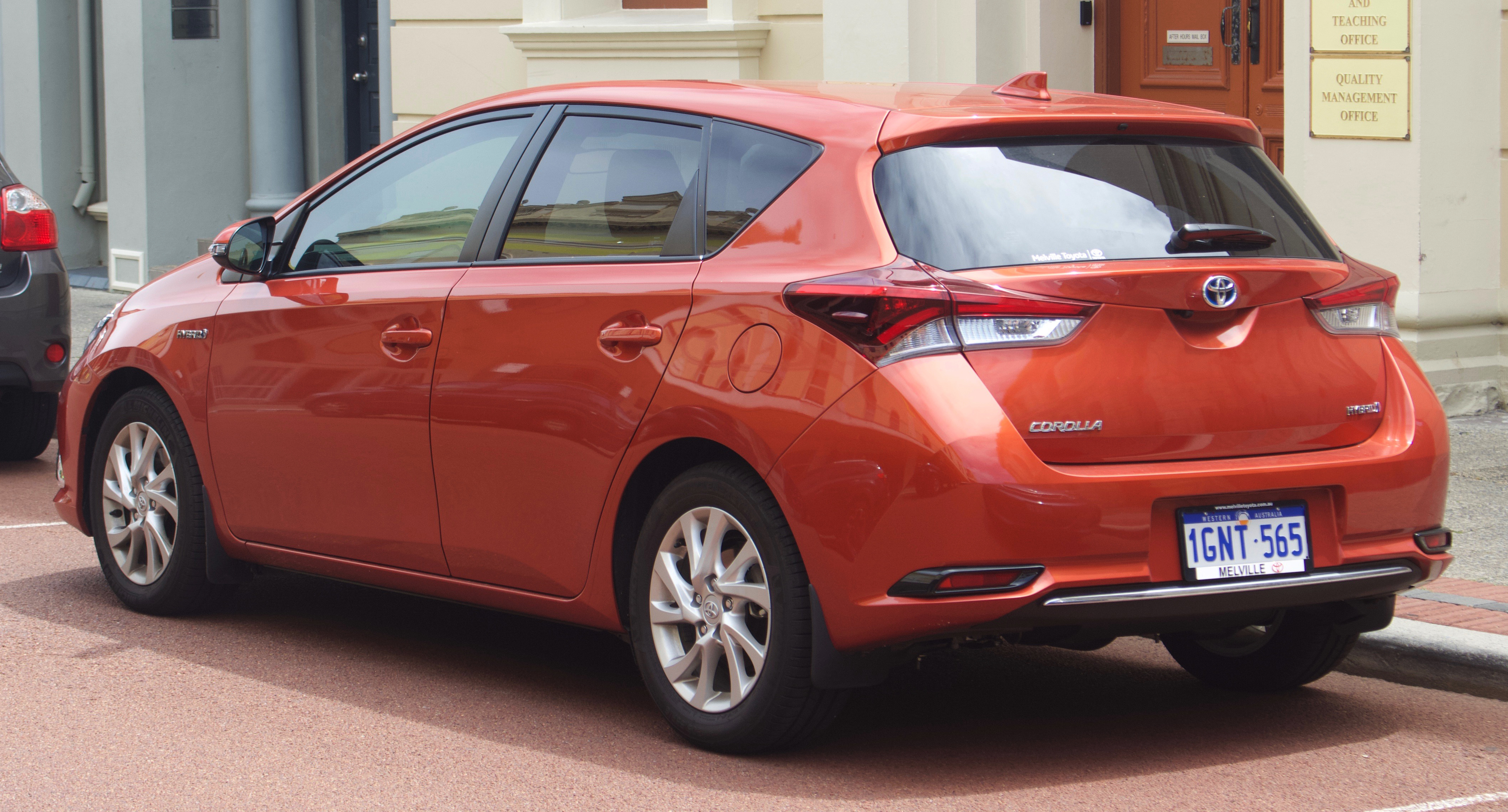
Facelift Corolla Hybrid (ZWE186, Australia)

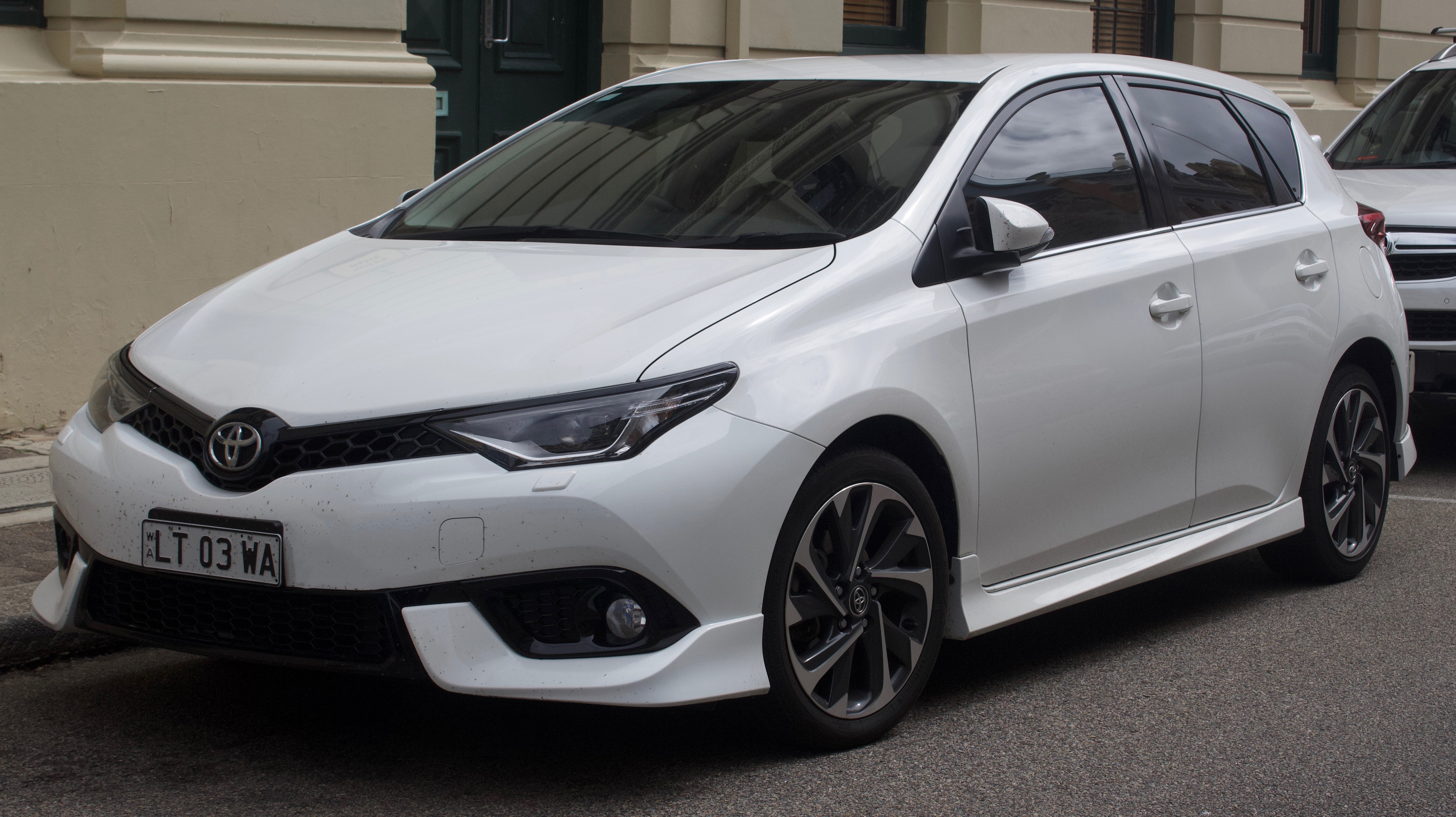
Facelift Corolla ZR hatchback (ZRE182, Australia)

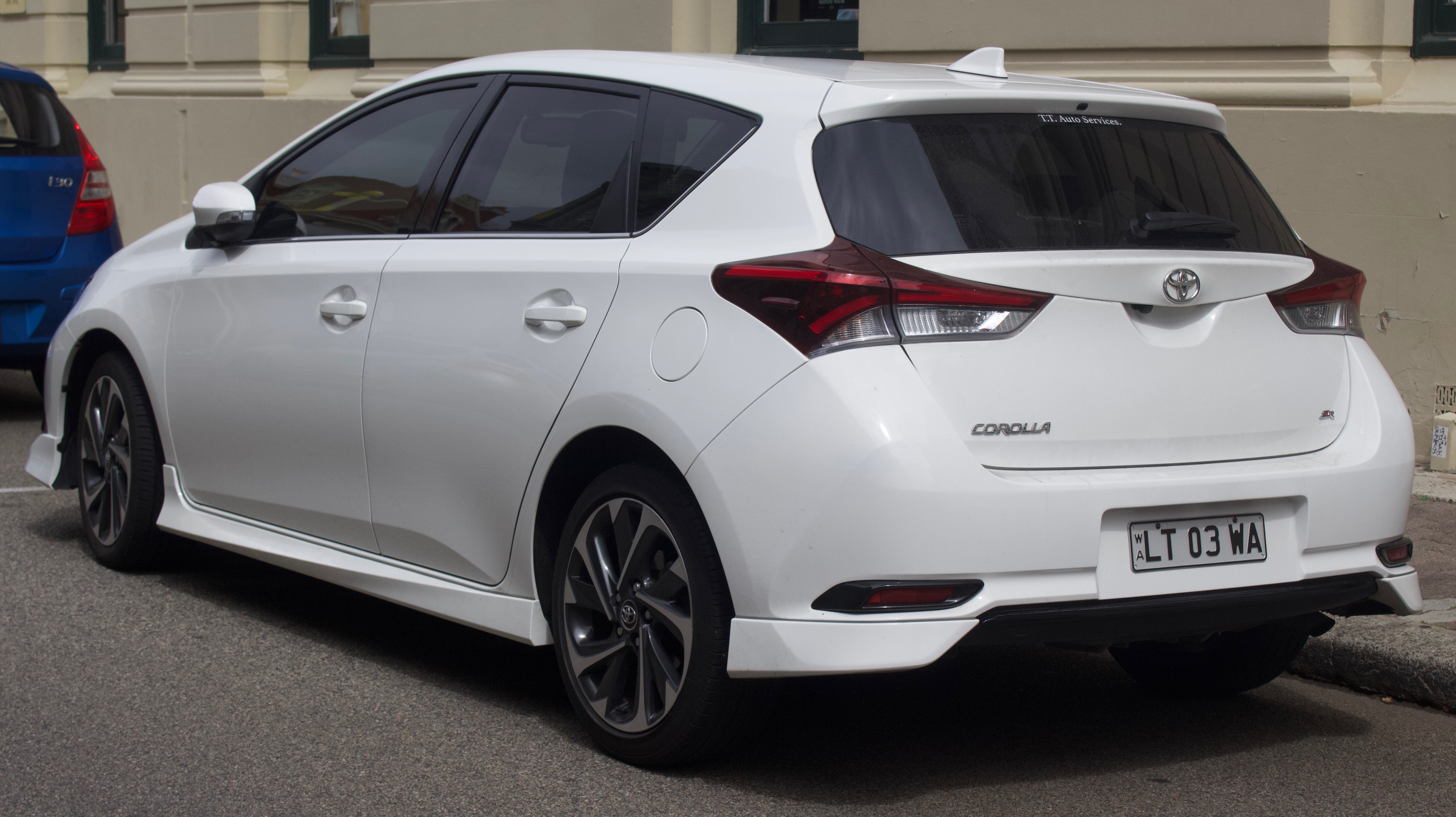
Facelift Corolla ZR hatchback (ZRE182, Australia)

==== Ireland ====
In Ireland, the Auris is available in a 5-door van form. This model is closely related to the 5-door hatchback. The main changes are a flat floor pan instead of the rear seat, black glass on the rear doors and a divider between the front seats and the load area. As of June 2019, this model is still in production.

==== North America ====
Toyota introduced the Scion iM concept car at the November 2014 Los Angeles Auto Show. It was based on the Auris five-door hatchback with aggressive body kits, lowered suspension, high performance brakes and 19-inch alloy wheels. The production version for the North American market debuted at the New York International Auto Show in April 2015.

While the 2016 iM partially filled the void left by the discontinued Scion xB, Toyota stated that it was not a direct replacement. The iM was only offered with a 1.8 L 2ZR-FAE Valvematic DOHC 16-valve inline-four engine that produces 102 kW (137 bhp) and 171 N⋅m (126 lbf⋅ft). The engine is mated to a six-speed manual transmission or a continuously variable transmission (CVTi-S).

In the United States, the Scion iM sold 5,097 units in 2015. Due to the discontinuation of the Scion marque in early 2016, the vehicle was re-branded as the Toyota Corolla iM for the 2017 model year. The Toyota Corolla iM therefore has the Toyota and iM emblem, but the Corolla emblem was never applied to the cars. Changes with the Corolla iM included a smaller under carriage shield that does not require removal for easier oil changes. The replaceable oil filter was changed to the spin-on type. The Corolla iM continued until it was replaced by the E210 series Corolla hatchback in March 2018, for the 2019 model year. All iM cars were manufactured in Japan.

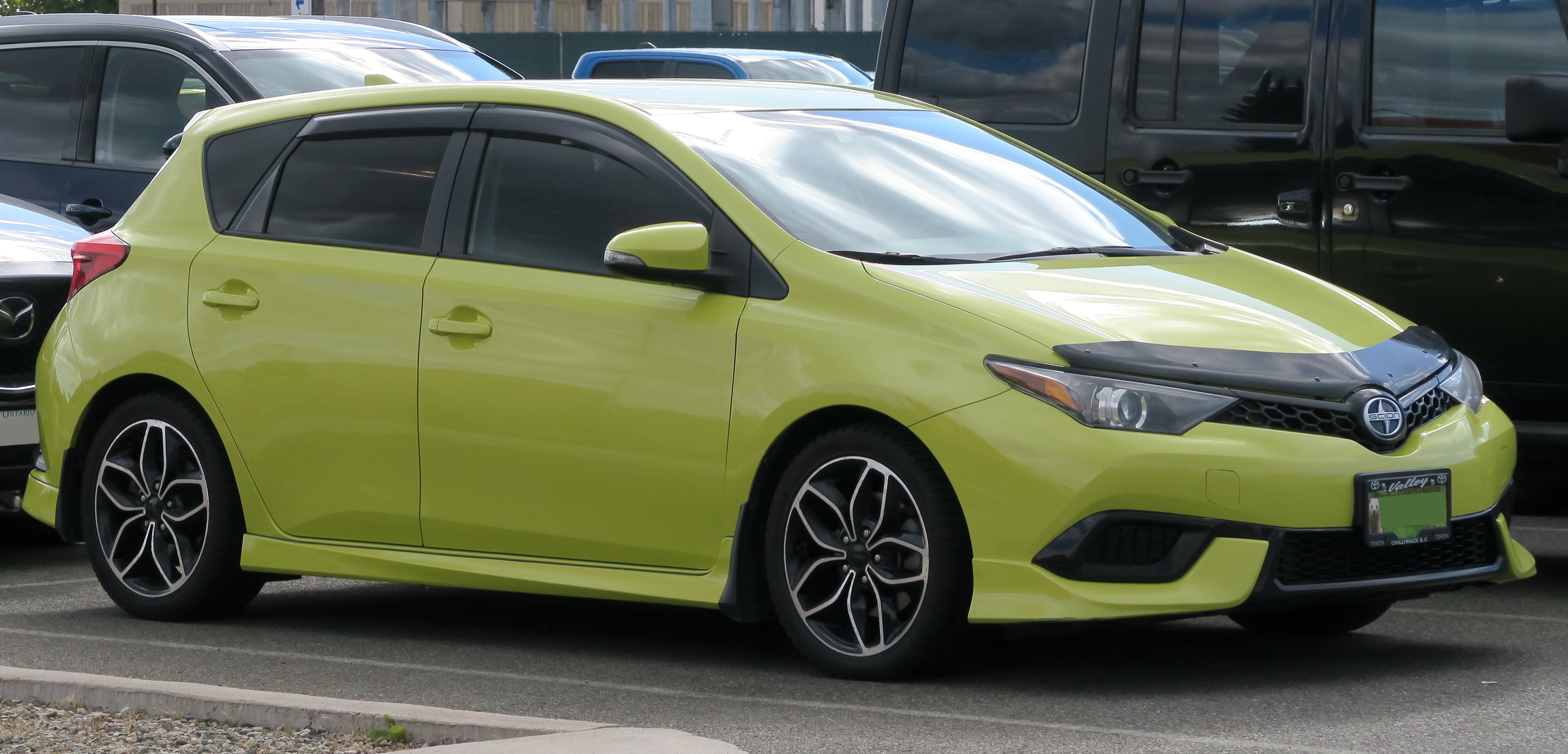
2016 Scion iM (ZRE186, Canada)

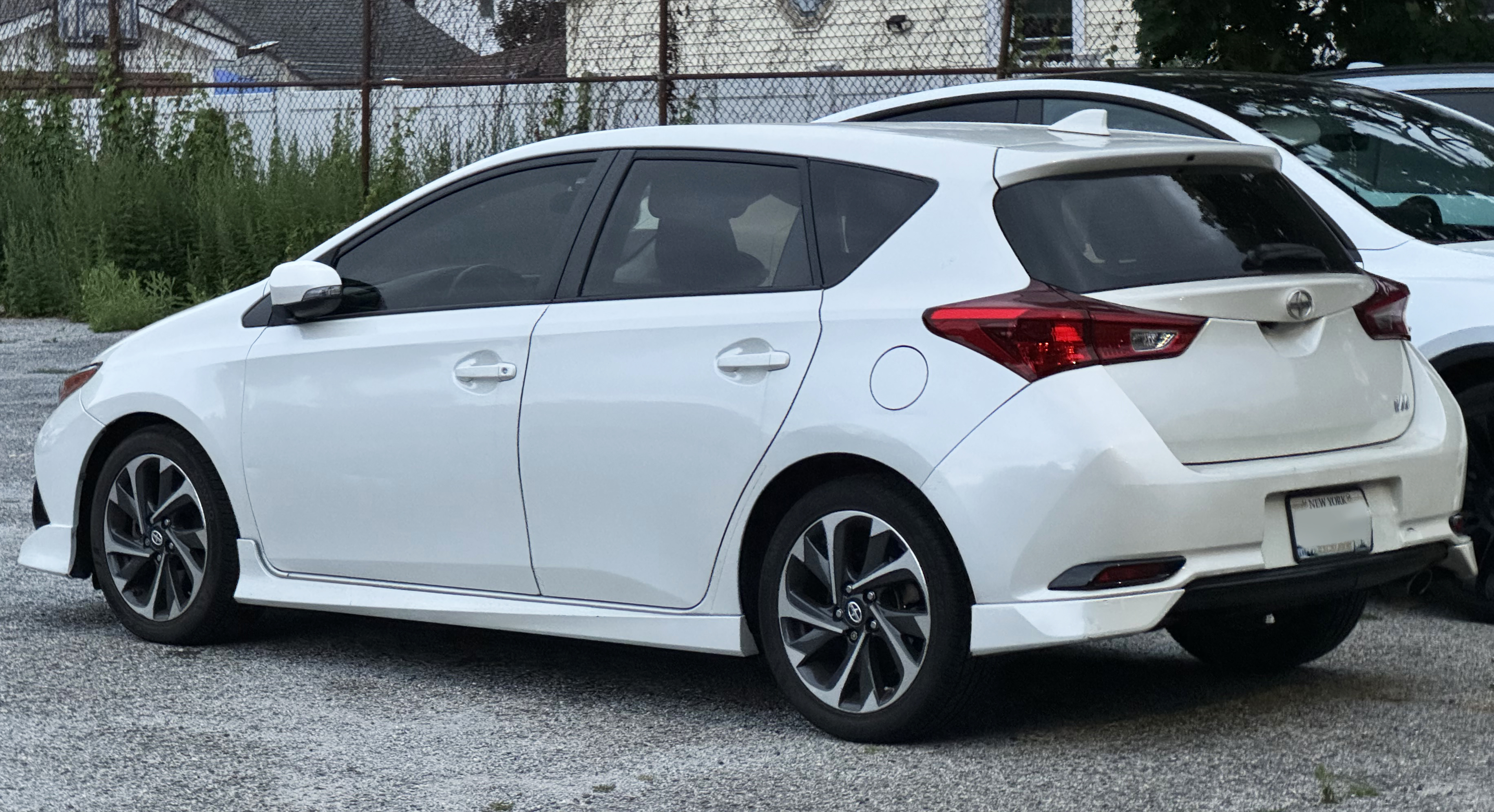
2016 Scion iM (ZRE186, US)

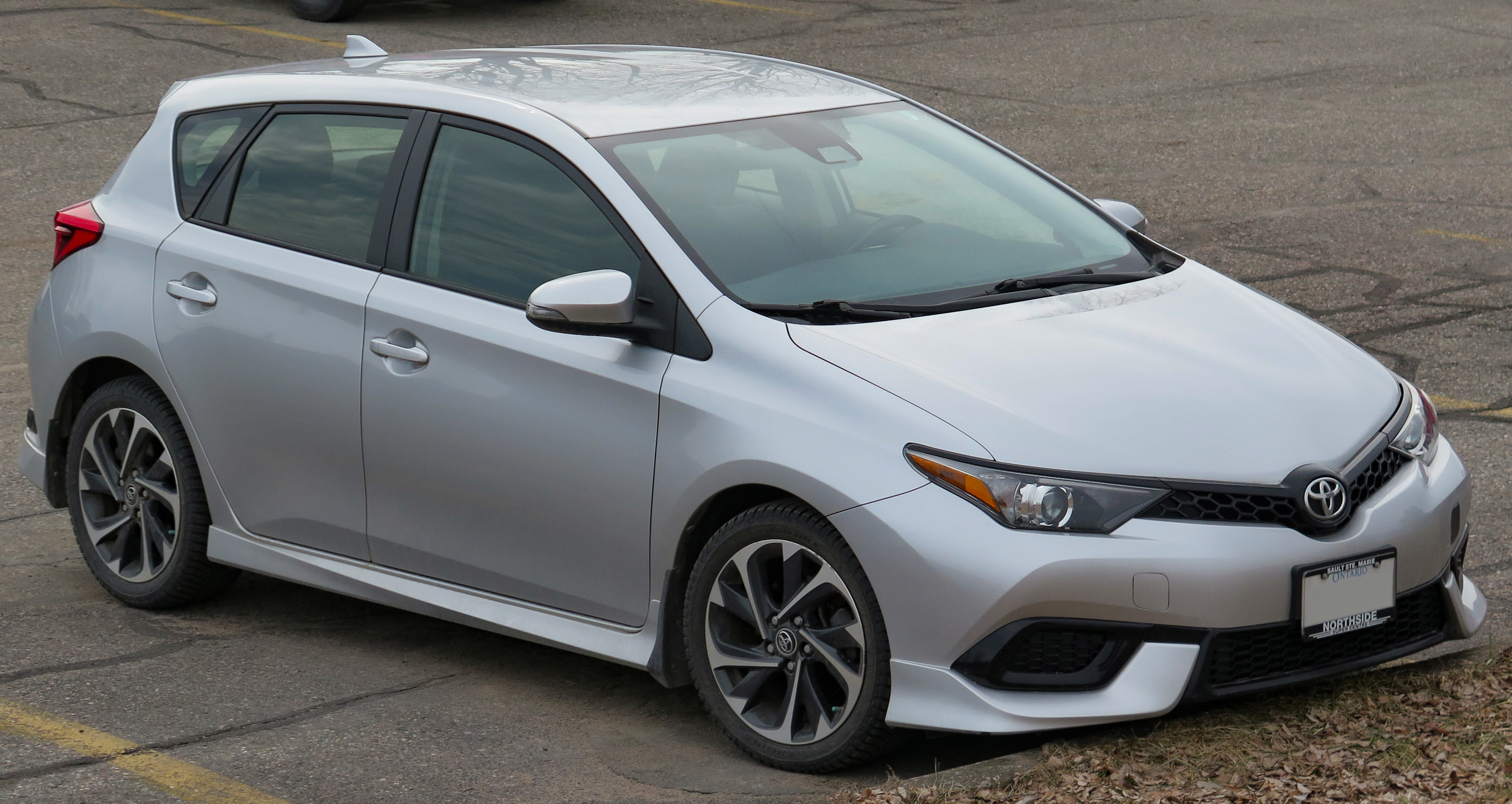
2017 Corolla iM (ZRE186, Canada)

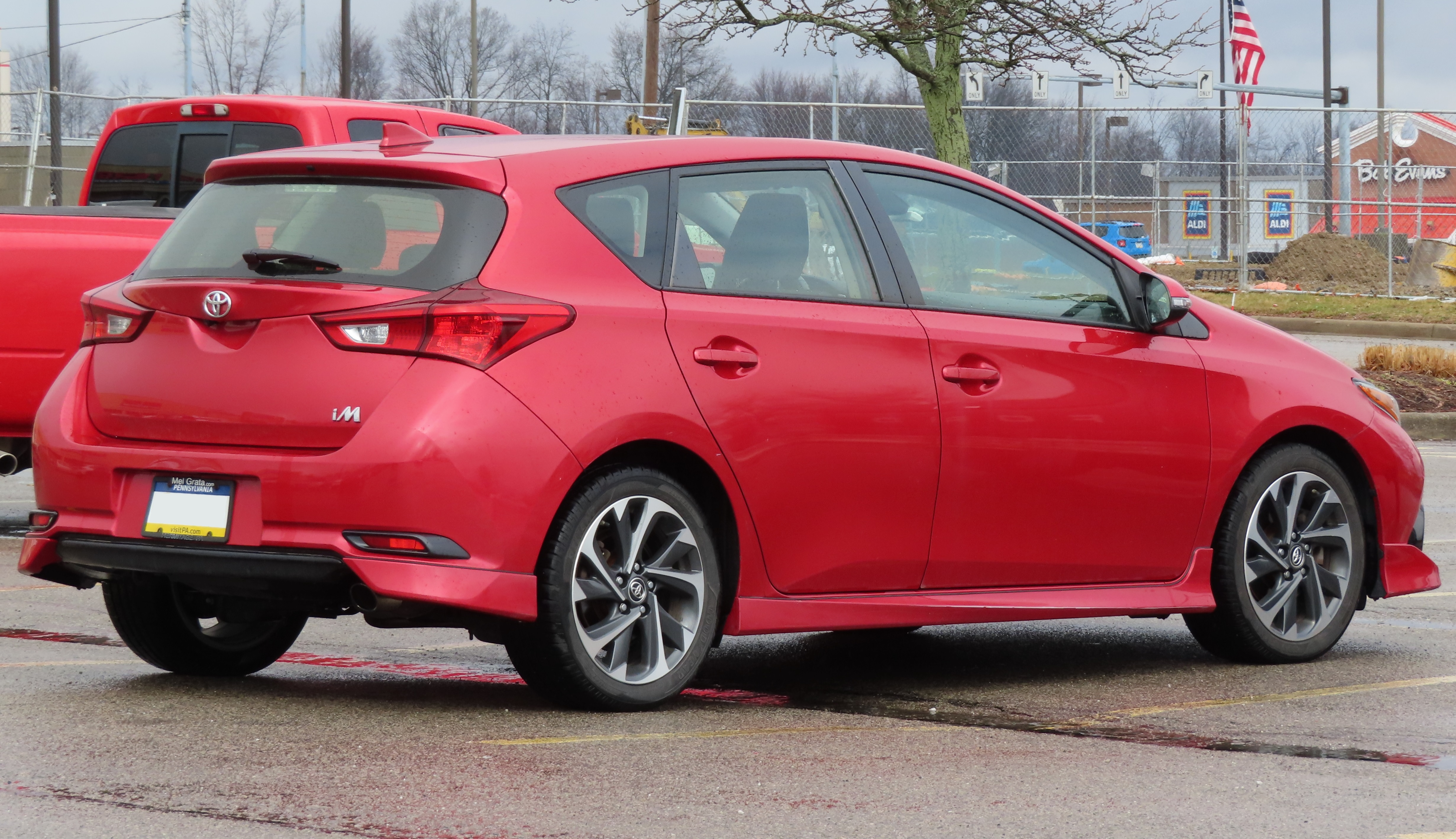
2017 Corolla iM (ZRE186, US)

=== Safety ===
ANCAP test results Toyota Corolla all hatch variants (2012)
Test	Score
Overall	5 /5 stars
Frontal offset	15.25/16
Side impact	15/16
Pole	2/2
Seat belt reminders	3/3
Whiplash protection	Adequate
Pedestrian protection	Adequate
Electronic stability control	Standard

ANCAP test results Toyota Corolla all hatch variants including Hybrid hatch (2014)
Test	Score
Overall	5 /5 stars
Frontal offset	15.25/16
Side impact	15/16
Pole	2/2
Seat belt reminders	3/3
Whiplash protection	Adequate
Pedestrian protection	Adequate
Electronic stability control	Standard

ANCAP test results Toyota Corolla all sedan variants (2014)
Test	Score
Overall	5 /5 stars
Frontal offset	14.88/16
Side impact	15/16
Pole	2/2
Seat belt reminders	2/3
Whiplash protection	Good
Pedestrian protection	Adequate
Electronic stability control	Standard

== Third generation (E210; 2018) ==
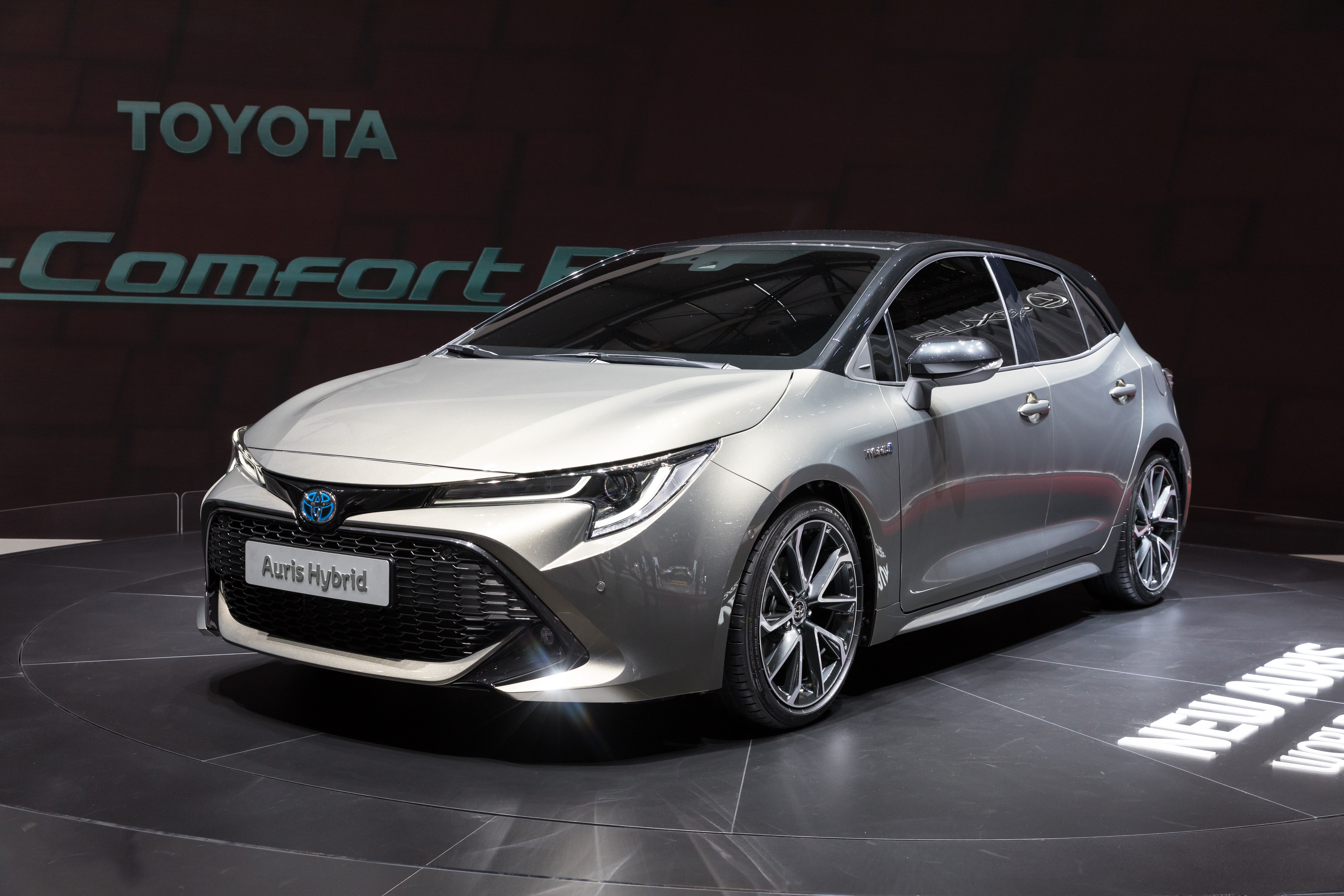
Toyota Auris Hybrid (front quarter view)

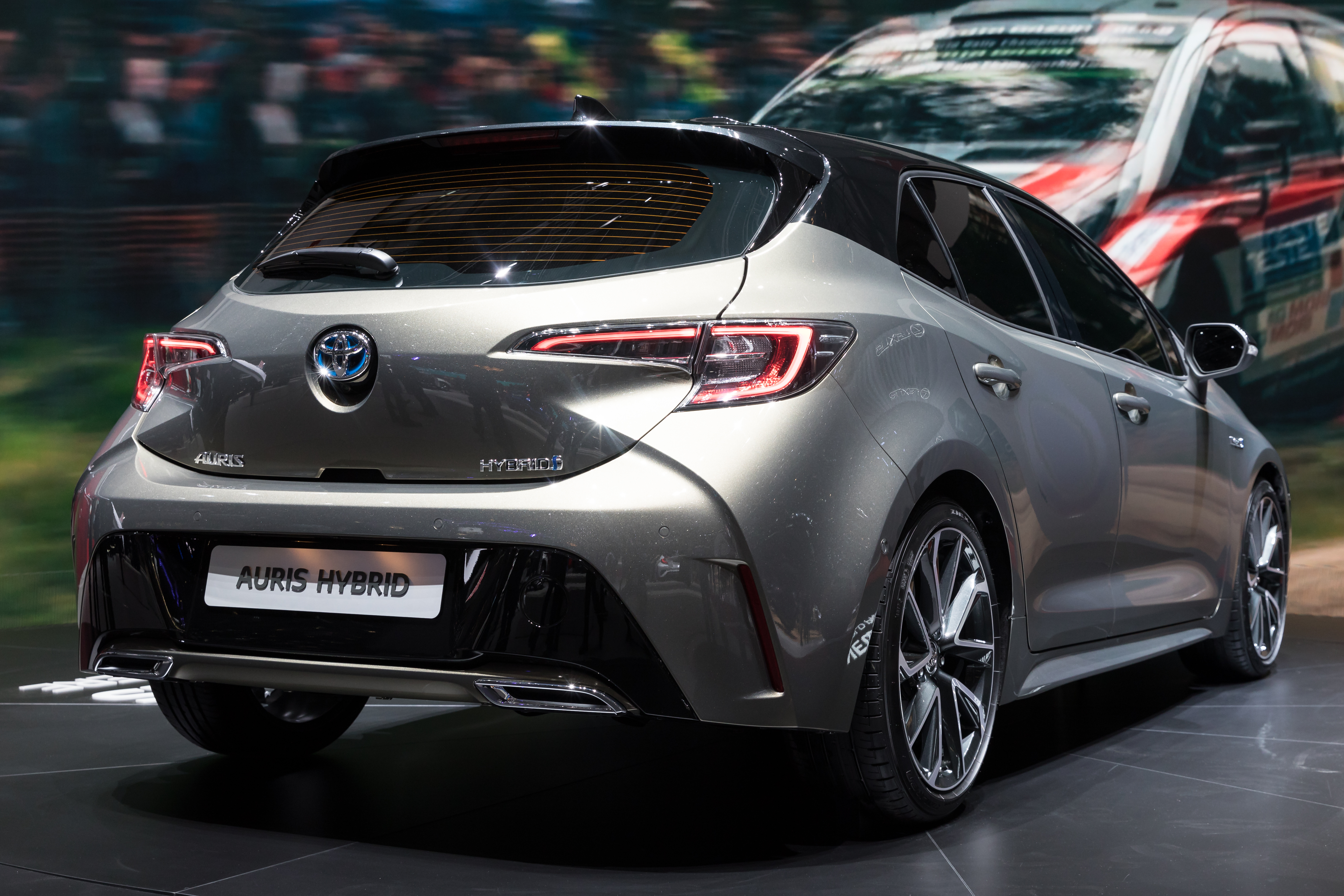
Toyota Auris Hybrid (rear quarter view)

The third generation Auris is based on the Toyota New Global Architecture (TNGA) platform. It was unveiled as a pre-production model in March 2018 at the Geneva Motor Show. The Auris nameplate was discontinued across Europe with the production version of the E210 series Corolla in January 2019, but it had been used in Taiwan from September 2018 to July 2020. The Taiwanese Auris is powered by a 2.0-litre M20A-FKS petrol engine mated to a simulated 10-speed Direct Shift K120 continuously variable transmission. It is equipped with TSS, VSC, TRC, HAC, Head-Up-Display, Push Start and Smart Entry.

On 15 July 2020, the Taiwanese Auris was renamed to Corolla Sport.

== Sales ==
Calendar year	Europe	Japan	United States	Canada
2007	12,490		N/A	
2008	132,605		N/A	
2009	98,373		N/A	
2010	15,237 hybrid		N/A	
2011	32,725 hybrid		N/A	
2013	39,348 hybrid 15,175 Touring hybrid		N/A	
2014	85,754 including 33,984 hybrid 56,351 Touring including 36,163 Touring Hybrid		N/A	
2015	142,369 including 78,515 hybrid		5,097	943
2016	144,052 including 85,838 hybrid		17,727	2,569
2017	121,725 including 82,388 hybrid	2,900 hybrid	20,501	
2018	116,129 including 89,761 hybrid		19,471	

== Motorsports ==
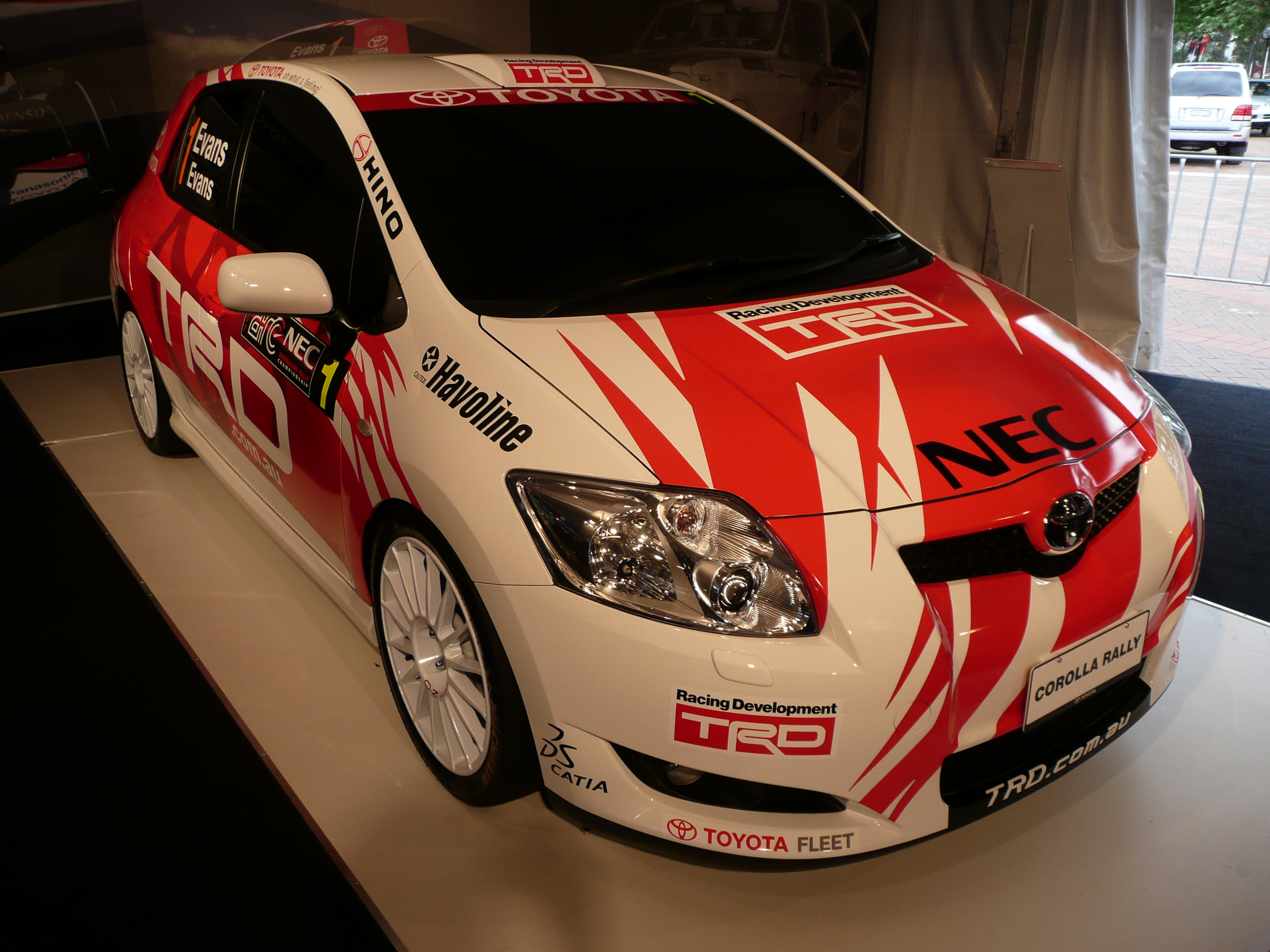
Toyota Corolla S2000 Rally Car (Australia)

The Auris-based Corolla hatchback was the winner of 2008 and 2009 Australian Rally Championship. This so-called Corolla S2000 has a modified 2.0-litre naturally aspirated 3S-GE engine as used by the Celica SS-III, all-wheel-drive system from the Celica GT-Four, and six-speed sequential gearbox. Neal Bates and co-driver Coral Taylor won the series of 2008, while Simon and Sue Evans were the winner in 2009.

== See also ==
- List of Toyota vehicles
