= Toyota SportsVan =

The Toyota SportsVan model name is used by:

- The second generation Toyota Corolla Verso, a compact MPV
- The Toyota Ipsum, a compact MPV
- The Toyota Verso, a compact MPV
