= Junpai D60 =

Chinese subcompact crossover

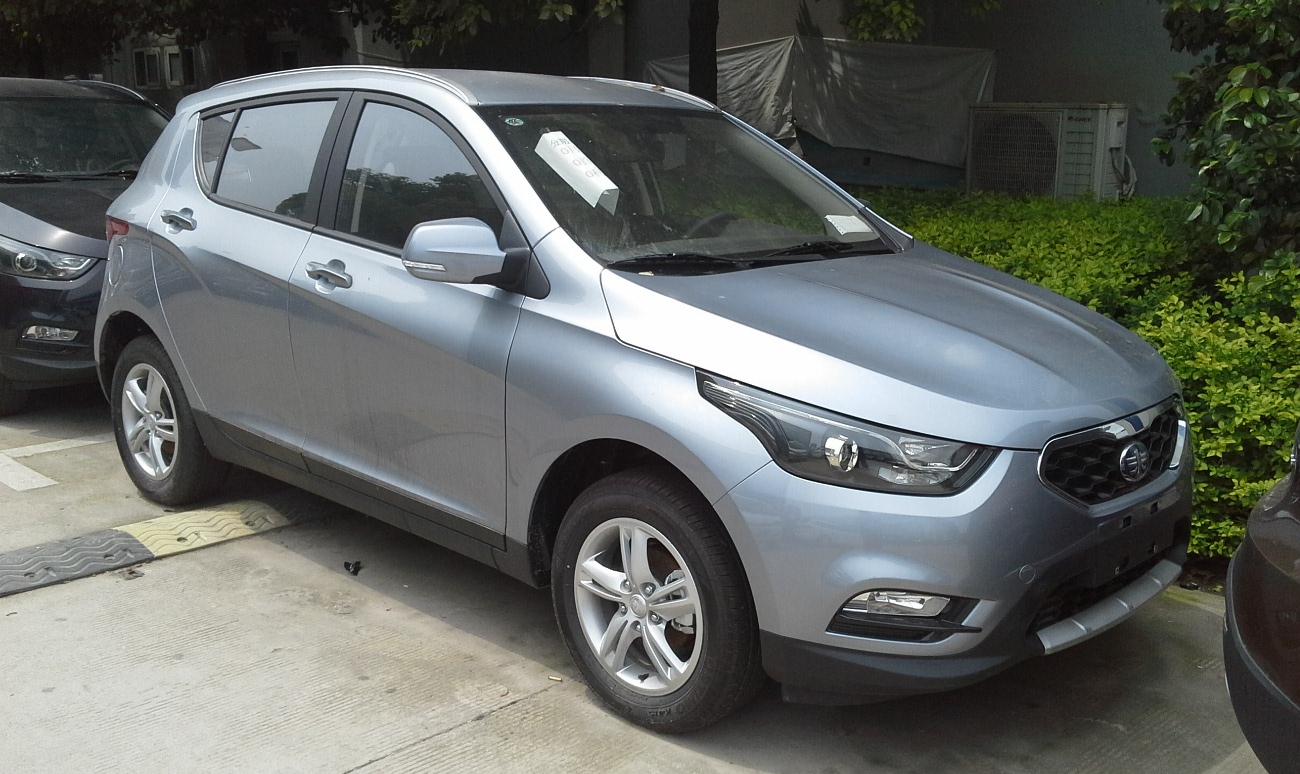
- FAW Junpai D60 (pre-facelift)

Overview
- Manufacturer: FAW Group
- Also called: FAW-Xiali T012
- Production: 2014–2019
- Model years: 2015–2019
- Assembly: Tianjin, China

Body and chassis
- Class: Subcompact crossover SUV
- Body style: 5-door hatchback
- Layout: FF

Powertrain
- Engine: 1.5 L FAW CA4GA5 I4 (petrol); 1.8 L Toyota 2ZR-FE I4 (petrol)
- Transmission: 5-speed manual 6-speed automatic

Dimensions
- Wheelbase: 2,557 mm (100.7 in)
- Length: 4,170 mm (164.2 in)
- Width: 1,765 mm (69.5 in)
- Height: 1,625 mm (64.0 in)
- Curb weight: 1,206–1,276 kg (2,659–2,813 lb)

The Junpai D60 is a subcompact crossover SUV produced by Junpai, a sub-brand of FAW Group.

== Overview ==
The Junpai (骏派) brand was launched in 2014, and it is a new brand of First Auto Works (FAW) with the Junpai D60 as their first car. Formerly known as the FAW Xiali T102, the Junpai D60 was originally planned to be a new product of the FAW Xiali brand, until the FAW Xiali brand was discontinued and replaced by the Junpai brand. The Junpai D60 received a facelift in 2017 for the 2018 model year featuring revised front and rear end designs.

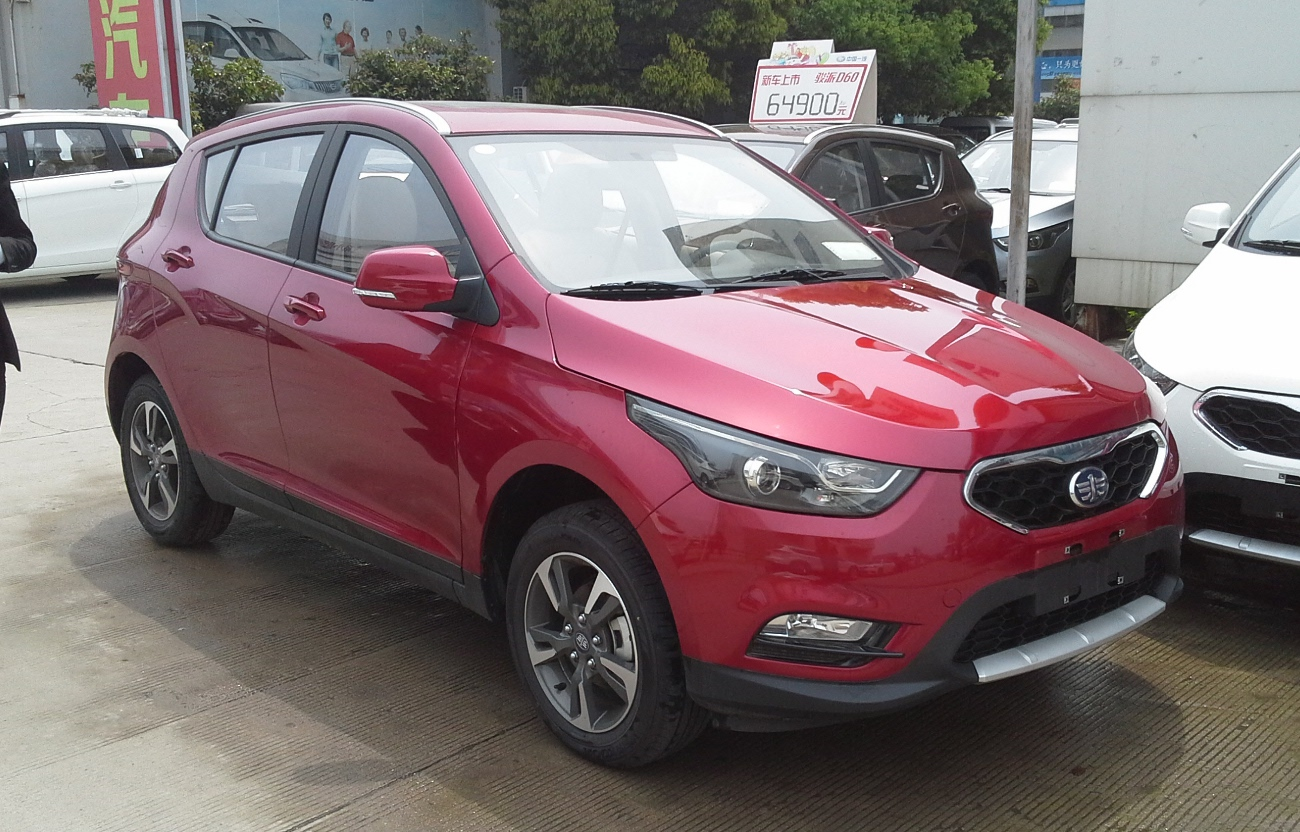
Junpai D60

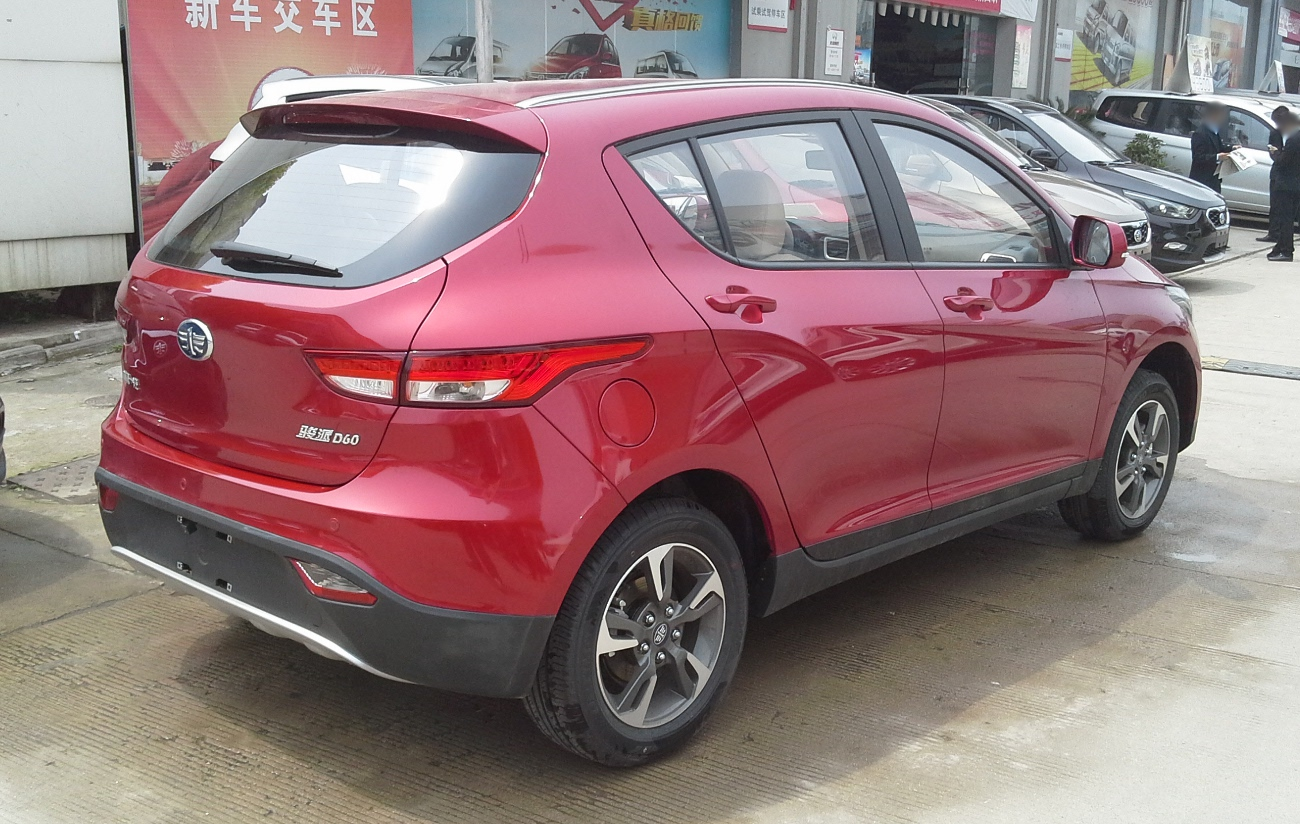
Rear
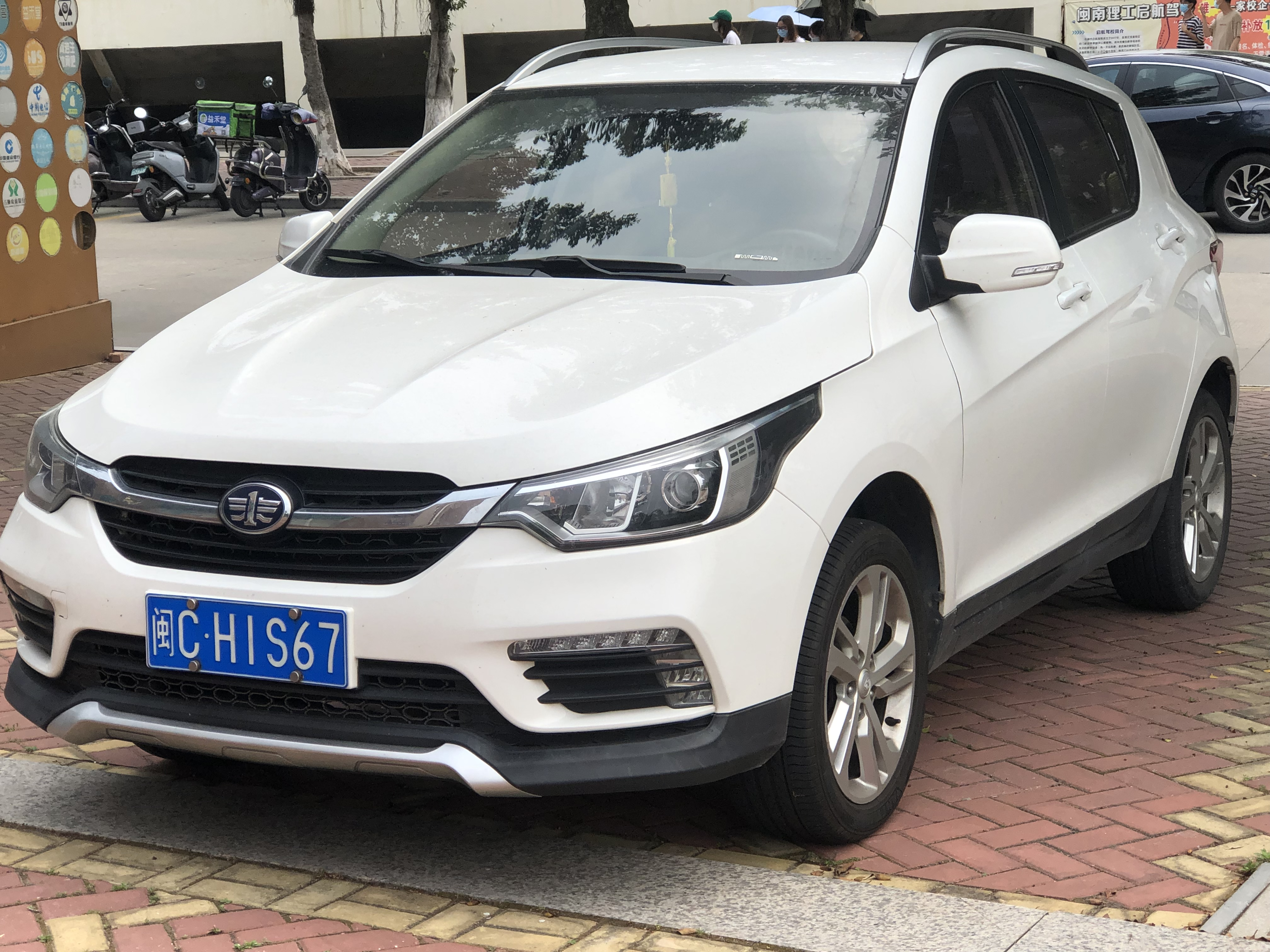
Junpai D60 MY2018

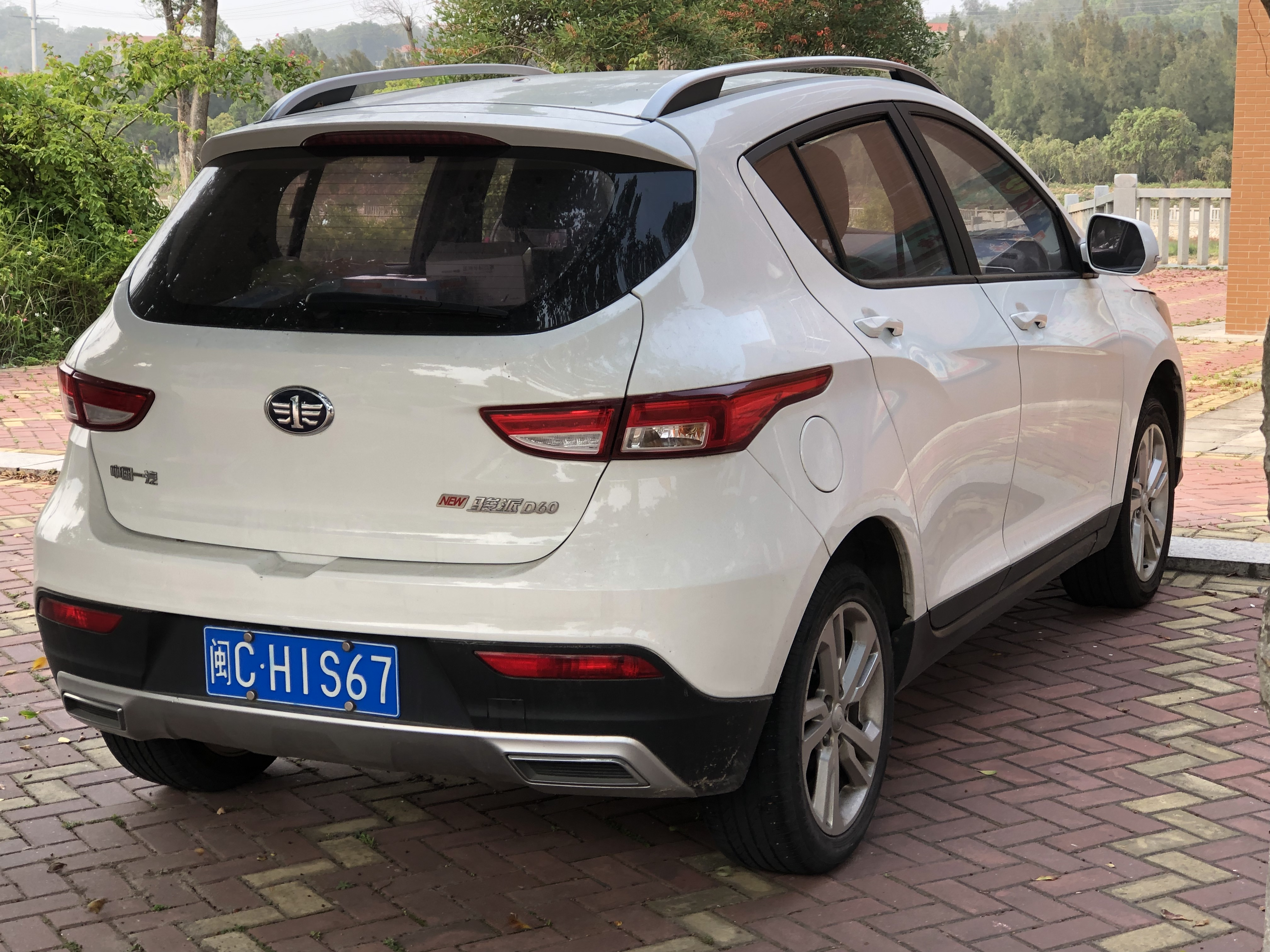
Rear

=== Powertrain ===
The Junpai D60 was available with two petrol-fueled four-cylinder engines including a 1.5 liter producing 100 hp and 135nm of torque, and a 1.8 liter producing 136hp and 170nm of torque, with two gearbox options available including a 5-speed manual gearbox and a 6-speed automatic gearbox. Prices of the Junpai D60 at launch ranges from 56,900 yuan to 89,900 yuan.
