= Toyota ZR engine =

Type of engine created by Toyota

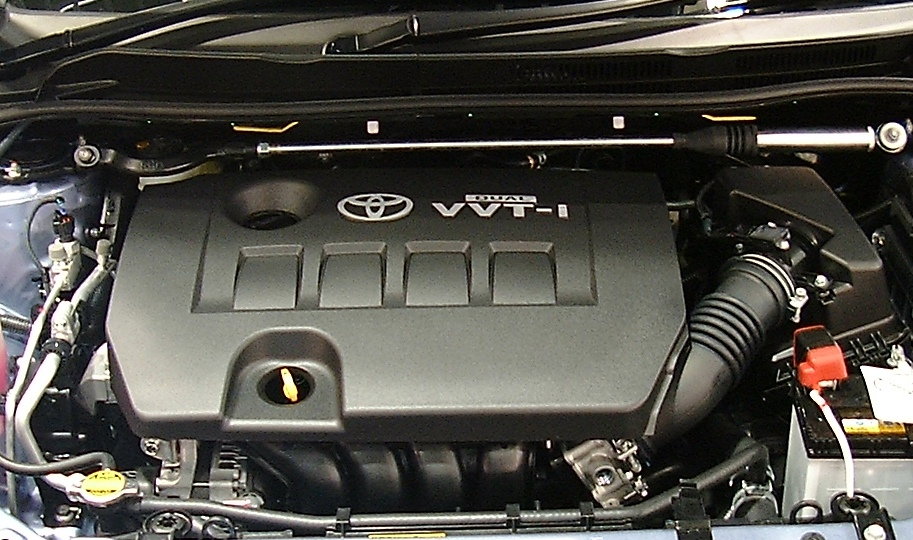
- 2ZR-FE engine

Overview
- Manufacturer: Toyota
- Production: 2007–present

Layout
- Configuration: Straight-four
- Cylinder block material: Aluminium
- Cylinder head material: Aluminium
- Valvetrain: DOHC 4 valves x cyl. with Dual VVT-i

Combustion
- Fuel system: Fuel injection
- Fuel type: Gasoline
- Cooling system: Water-cooled

Output
- Power output: 98–217 hp (73–162 kW; 99–220 PS)
- Torque output: 153–207 N⋅m (113–153 lb⋅ft; 16–21 kg⋅m)

Chronology
- Predecessor: ZZ engine
- Successor: Toyota M20A engine

The ZR engine is a family of straight-four 16-valve all-aluminum and water cooled gasoline engines with a die-cast aluminum block and variable valve timing developed by Toyota Motor Corporation, produced from 2007. Engines displace from 1.6 to 2.0 liters. Most engines in this family are equipped with Toyota's dual VVT-i technology that optimizes both intake and exhaust valve timing. This engine family is also the first to use Toyota's Valvematic system, first appearing on the Noah and Voxy in 2007 and then the European Avensis in 2009.

== 1ZR-FE ==
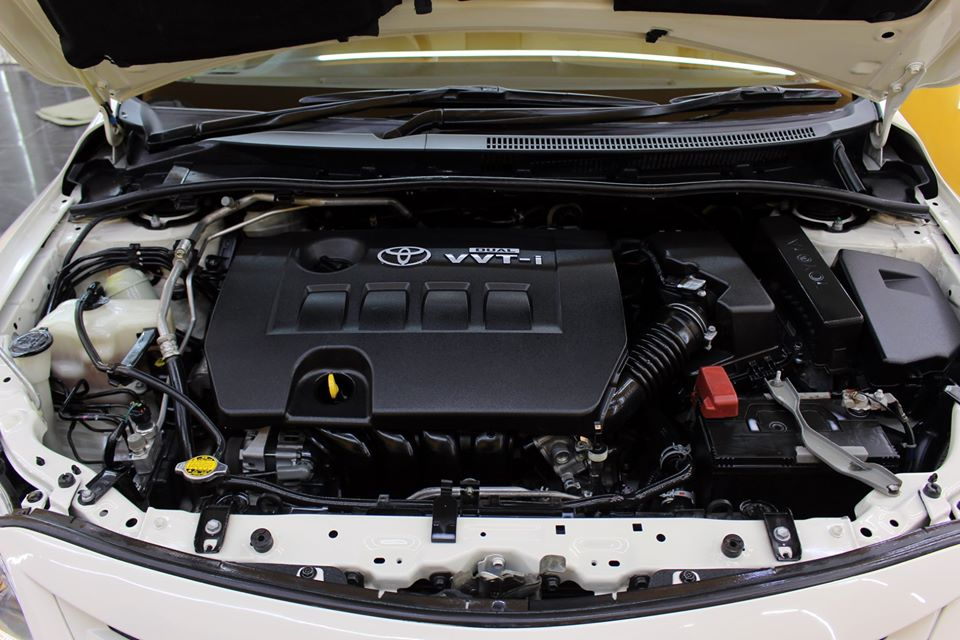
1ZR-FE in Toyota Corolla 1.6

The Toyota 1ZR-FE is a DOHC, 16-valve, 1.6 L (1,598 cc) engine equipped with dual VVT-i. This engine is available with either manual gearbox (5 or 6 Speed), a "multi-mode" manual transmission (MM-T 5 Speed) or an automatic gearbox (4 Speed). This new engine is now replacing the 3ZZ-FE engine in most applications. Output for this engine is rated at 122 hp (91 kW) at 6400 rpm and 113 lb⋅ft (153 N⋅m) of torque at 5200 rpm net.

Specifications

- Engine type : In-Line 4-cylinder DOHC 16-valve
- Bore x Stroke : 80.5 mm × 78.5 mm (3.17 in × 3.09 in)
- Compression Ratio : 10.2:1

Applications

- Toyota Auris (ZRE151) (Europe only)
- Toyota Corolla EX (ZRE120) (China only)
- Toyota Corolla (ZRE140, ZRE151) (Europe, Middle East)
- Toyota Corolla Altis (ZRE141) (Facelift; Asia only)
- Toyota Corolla Altis (ZRE170)

== 1ZR-FAE ==
The Toyota 1ZR-FAE is a DOHC, 16-valve, 1.6 L (1,598 cc) engine equipped with both Dual VVT-i and the Valvematic lift system. Output for this engine is rated at 132 hp (98 kW) at 6400 rpm and 118 lb⋅ft (160 N⋅m) of torque at 4400 rpm for most applications. Compression ratio has been increased to 10.7:1, red line is at 6600 rpm. VVT-i varies the intake valve lift between 1 and 11 mm (0.039 and 0.433 in) according to load and RPM.

Specifications

- Engine type : In-Line 4-cylinder DOHC 16-valve
- Bore x Stroke : 80.5 mm × 78.5 mm (3.17 in × 3.09 in)
- Compression Ratio : 10.7:1
- Weight : 123 kg (271,17 lb), without fuel
- 16.67 km/L (47.1 mpg_{‑imp}; 39.2 mpg_{‑US}) fuel consumption

Applications

- Toyota Auris (ZRE151) (Europe only)
- Toyota Corolla (ZRE181) (Europe only)
- Toyota Corolla Altis (ZRE171) (Asia only)
- Toyota Corolla Altis (E210) 2019–current
- Toyota Avensis (ZRT270)
- Toyota Verso (ZGR20)
- Lotus Elise (2010–2021)

== 1ZR-FBE ==
The Toyota 1ZR-FBE is a flex fuel version of the 1ZR-FE the DOHC, 16-valve, 1.6 L (1,598 cc) engine also equipped with Dual VVT-i and Valvematic. Output for this engine is rated at 125 hp (93 kW) at 6000 rpm and 116 lb⋅ft (157 N⋅m) of torque at 5200 rpm.

Applications

- Toyota Corolla (ZRE170) (Southeast Asia only)
- Toyota Corolla Altis (E210) 2019–current (Southeast Asia only)

== 2ZR-FE ==
The Toyota 2ZR-FE is a DOHC, 16-valve, 1.8 L (1,798 cc) engine also equipped with Dual VVT-i.

This new engine replaces the 1ZZ-FE engine in most applications. Output for this engine is rated at 98–103 kW (132–138 hp) at 6000 rpm and 173 N⋅m (127.5 lb⋅ft) of torque at 4400 rpm for the Corolla, Matrix, and Vibe and 95 kW (128 hp) and 171 N⋅m (126 lb⋅ft) of torque in the Scion xD.

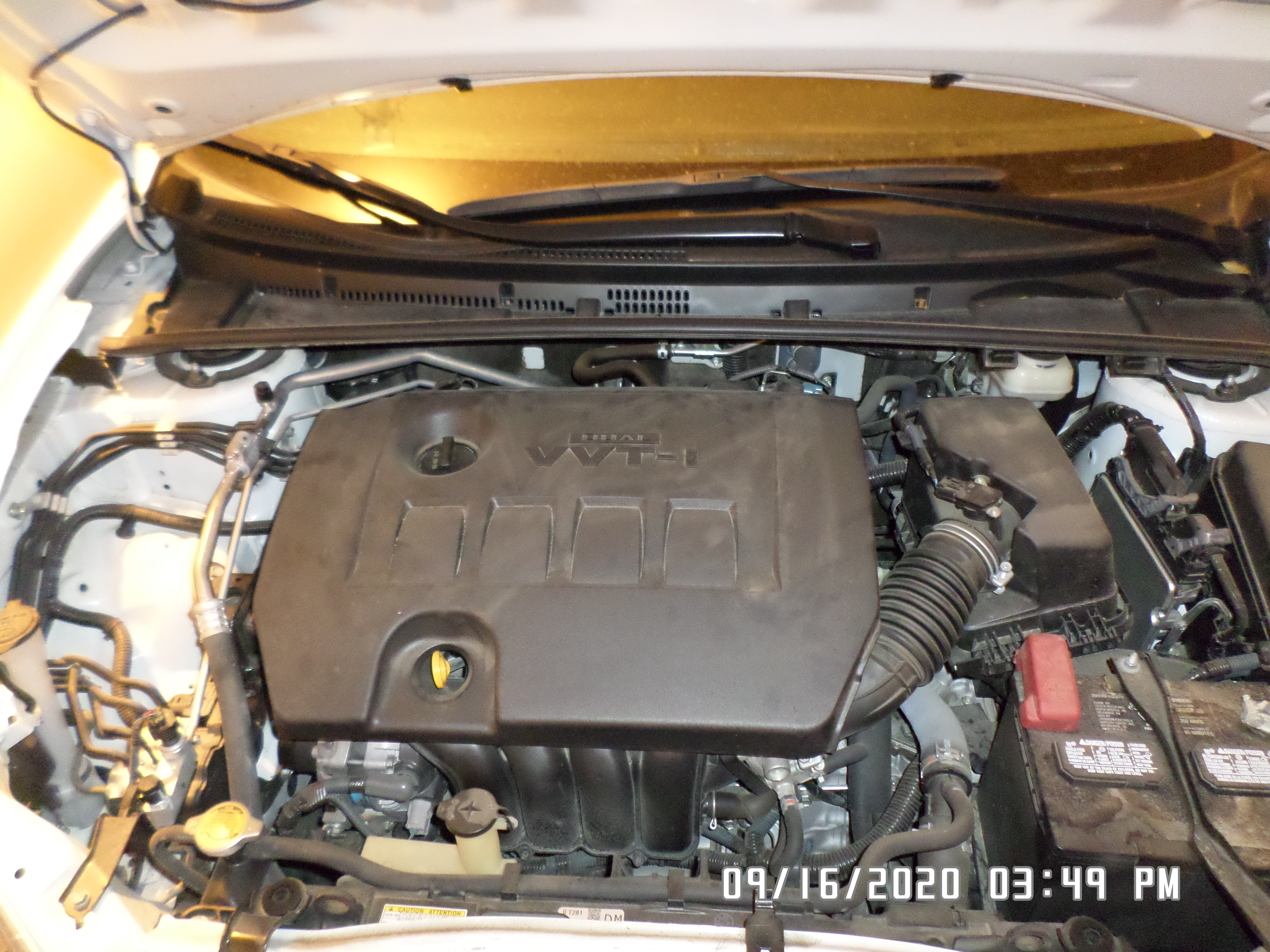
2ZR-FE with cover installed. (2016 Toyota Corolla LE)

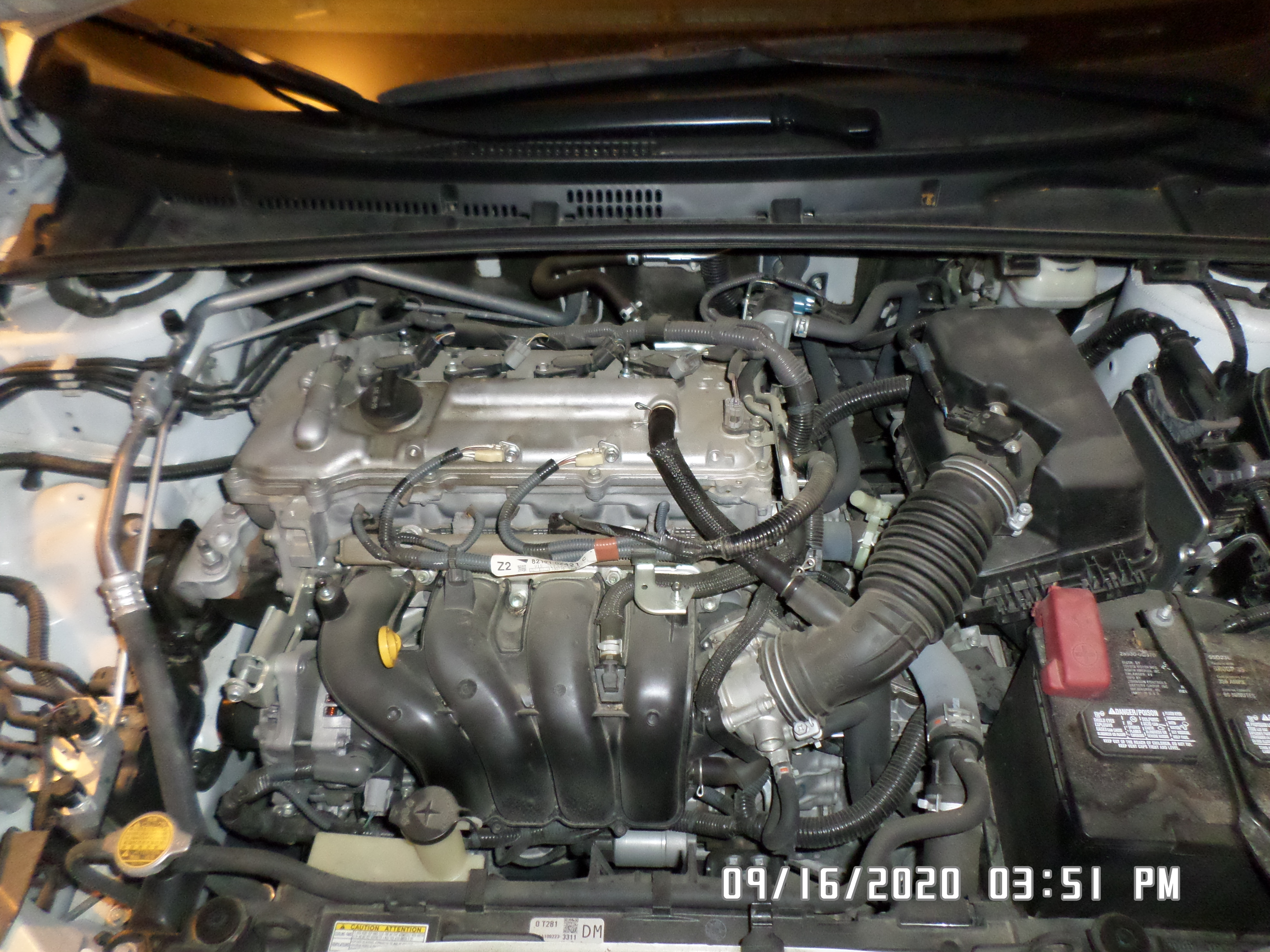
2ZR-FE with cover taken off. (2016 Toyota Corolla LE)

Specifications

- Engine Type : In-Line 4-cylinder DOHC 16-valve
- Bore × Stroke = 80.5 mm × 88.3 mm (3.17 in × 3.48 in)
- Compression Ratio : 10.0:1
- Weight : 97 kg (214 lb), without fuel
- 15.2 km/L (43 mpg_{‑imp}; 36 mpg_{‑US}) fuel consumption (10-15 Australia & New Zealand test cycle)

Applications

- Toyota Allion (ZRT260/265) 2007-2009
- Toyota Premio (ZRT260/265) 2007-2009
- Toyota Corolla (ZRE142/152)
- Toyota Corolla (ZRE172) (132 hp (98 kW) for all markets except 138 hp (103 kW) Corolla Altis for Asia-Pacific market)
- Toyota Corolla Axio/Fielder (NZE141) (Japan only)
- Toyota Corolla Axio/Fielder (NZE161) (Japan only)
- Toyota Corolla Hatchback (ZRE182)
- Toyota Corolla Cross (ZSG10)
- Toyota Auris (ZRE152/154)
- Toyota Yaris T Sport (ZSP90) (Europe only)
- Toyota Matrix/Pontiac Vibe (ZRE142) (North America only)
- Toyota Yaris GRMN with supercharger (205 hp (153 kW))
- Scion xD (ZSP110)
- Lotus Elise with supercharger (217 bhp (162 kW))
- Junpai D60

== 2ZR-FAE ==
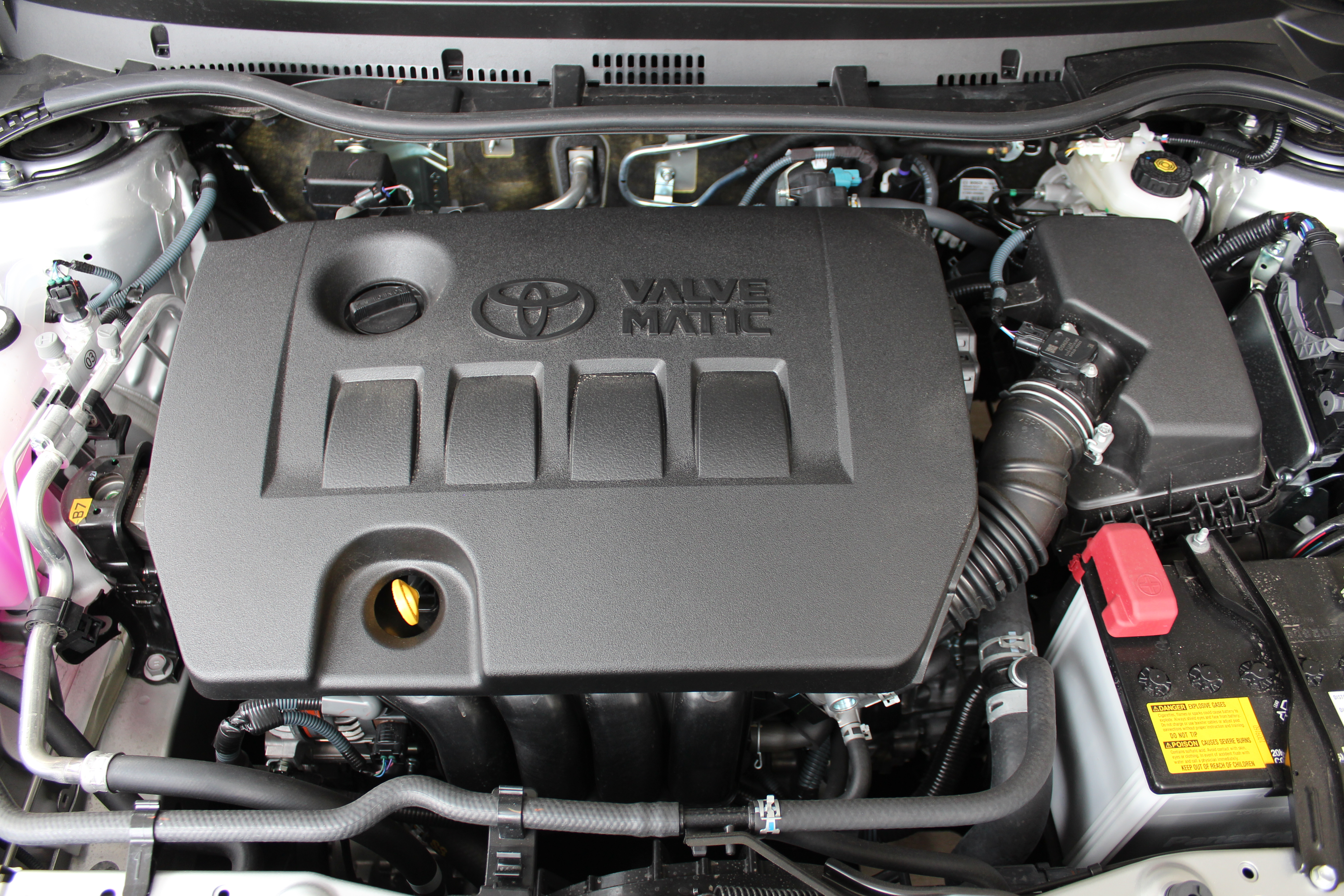
2ZR-FAE

The Toyota 2ZR-FAE is a DOHC, 16-valve, 1.8 L (1,798 cc) engine equipped with the Valvematic system. This all-new engine is progressively replacing the Japan-built 1ZZ-FE (often incorrectly referred to as "1ZZ-FED") and 2ZR-FE engine in most applications. Variants of this engine produce 104–110 kW (139–148 bhp) and 171–175 N⋅m (126–129 lbf⋅ft) of torque. Compression ratio is 10.5:1 and redline is at 6600 rpm. The engine consumes 5–10% less fuel than the 2ZR-FE depending on the application.

A special version of the 2ZR-FAE was introduced by Toyota in 2016 for the Taiwanese version of the Toyota Sienta. Unlike the original 2ZR-FAE, this version was created by simply adding the Valvematic system to the standard 2ZR-FE engine used in the Toyota Corolla Altis sold there, resulting in total power of 140 PS (103 kW; 138 hp) at 6200 rpm and a peak torque of 172 N⋅m; 127 lbf⋅ft (17.5 kg⋅m) at 4000 rpm.

Applications

- Toyota Auris (ZRE152) (Europe and Japan only)
- Toyota Avensis (ZRT271)
- Toyota Corolla LE Eco only (2014–2019) (ZRE172); L, LE, and XLE trims (2019–2022) (ZRE212)
- Toyota Corolla Sedan & Corolla Touring (Japan 2019–current) (ZRE212/212W)
- Toyota Corolla Rumion (ZRE152/154) (Japan only)
- Toyota Levin (ZRE172/212) (China only) 2014–current
- Toyota iSt (ZSP110) (Japan only)
- Toyota Wish (ZGE20/25)
- Toyota Verso (ZGR21)
- Toyota Allion (ZRT260/265) 2010–current
- Toyota Premio (ZRT260/265) 2010–current
- Scion iM 2016
- Toyota Corolla iM 2017-2018
- Toyota Sienta (ZSP170) October 2016–present (Taiwan only)
- Toyota Corolla Cross (ZSG10, Japan only)

== 2ZR-FBE ==
The Toyota 2ZR-FBE is a flex fuel version of the 2ZR-FE the DOHC, 16-valve, 1.8 L (1,798 cc) engine also equipped with Dual VVT-i and Valvematic. Output for this engine is rated at 141 hp (105 kW) at 6000 rpm and 131 lb⋅ft (178 N⋅m) of torque at 4000 rpm.

Applications

- Toyota Corolla Altis (E140) 2012–2013
- Toyota Corolla (ZRE170)
- Toyota C-HR (NGX10) 2018–present / 2018–2021 (Thailand)
- Toyota Corolla Altis (ZRE211) 2019–present
- Toyota Corolla Cross (ZSG10)

== 2ZR-FXE ==
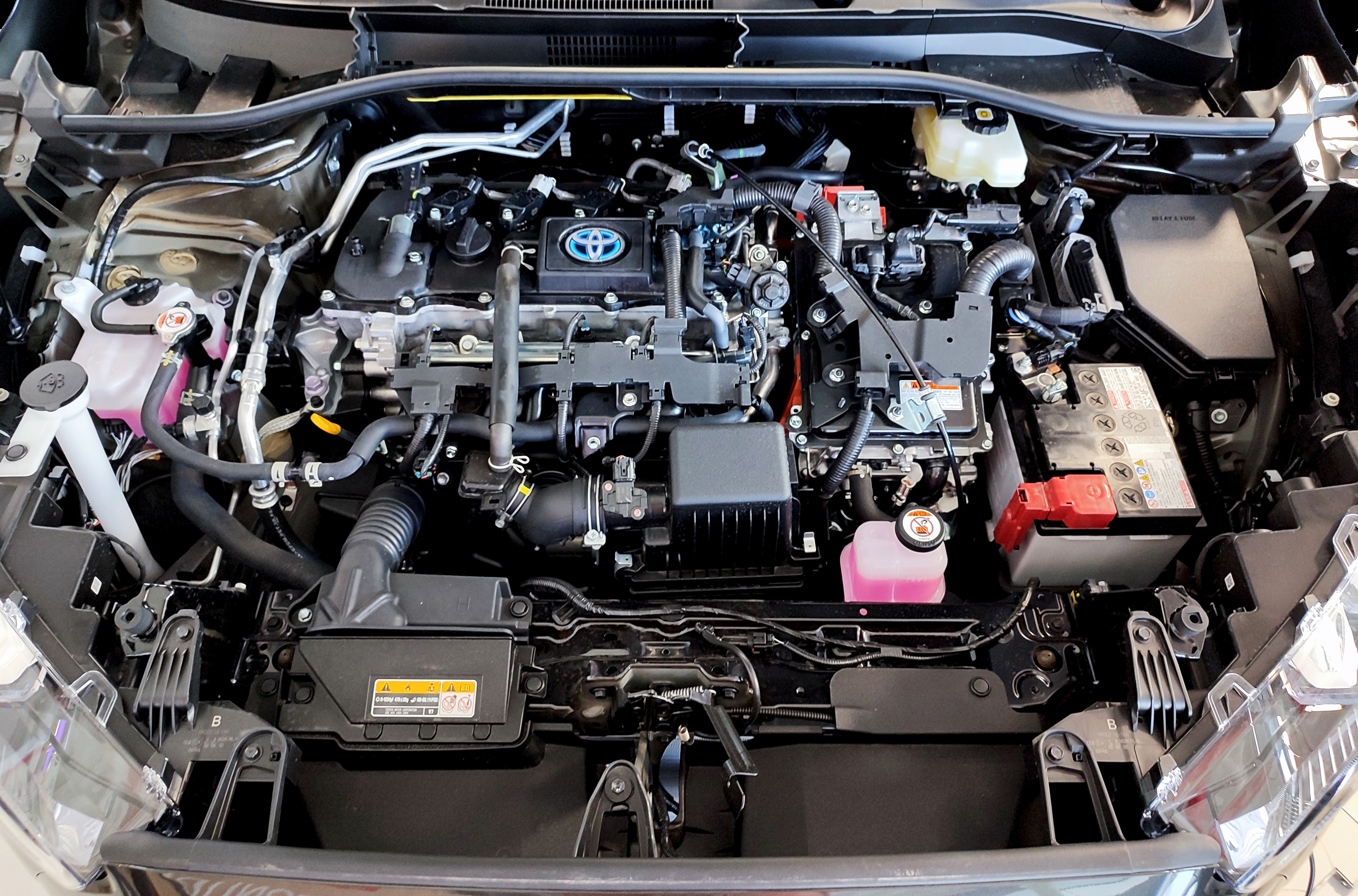
Toyota Corolla Cross 2ZR-FXE Hybrid engine (2023)

The Toyota 2ZR-FXE is a 1.8 L (1,797 cc) Atkinson cycle variant of the 2ZR-FE. It has the same bore and stroke, but the compression ratio is increased to 13.0:1, and the inlet valve closing is late-staged. The net result is that the engine has a greater effective expansion than compression. Output is 73 kW (98 hp; 99 PS) at 5200 rpm and 142 N⋅m (105 lb⋅ft) of torque at 4000 rpm for the ICE.

When paired with the more powerful electric motor/generator of the Hybrid Synergy Drive (Gen 5) system (2023-), the engine and electric motors produce up to 103 kW (138 hp; 140 PS) and 207 N⋅m (153 lb⋅ft). Maximum thermal efficiency is about 38.5%.

Whereas with the older Hybrid Synergy Drive (Gen 4), the engine and electric motors produce up to 88 kW (118 hp; 120 PS).

For the 2016 Toyota Prius, output is 95 hp (71 kW) at 5200 rpm and 105 lb⋅ft (142 N⋅m) of torque at 3600 rpm, or when paired with electric motor/generators 71 hp (53 kW) and 120 lb⋅ft (163 N⋅m) of torque in the hybrid drive system; together the engine and electric motors produce up to 121 hp (90 kW). Maximum thermal efficiency is about 40%.

Applications

- Toyota Auris — E180 (2011–2018)
- Toyota C-HR/IZOA — AX10/AX50 (2016–2023)
- Toyota Corolla — E210 (2018–present)
  - Toyota Auris — E210 (2018–2020)
  - Toyota Levin — E210 (2019–present)
  - Suzuki Swace — E210 (2020–present)
- Toyota Corolla Cross — XG10 (2020–present)
- Toyota Noah/Voxy — R80 (2014–2021), R90 (2022–present)
  - Toyota Esquire — R80 (2014–2021)
  - Suzuki Landy — R90 (2022–present)
- Toyota Prius
  - XW30 (Third generation) (2009–2015)
  - XW50 (Fourth generation) (2015–2022)
  - XW60 (Fifth generation) (2022–present)
- Toyota Prius Plug-in Hybrid/Prime
  - XW30 (First generation) (2012–2014)
  - XW50 (Second generation) (2015–2022)
- Toyota Prius v — ZVW40/41 (2012–2017)
- Lexus CT — ZWA10 (2011–2022)

== 3ZR-FE ==
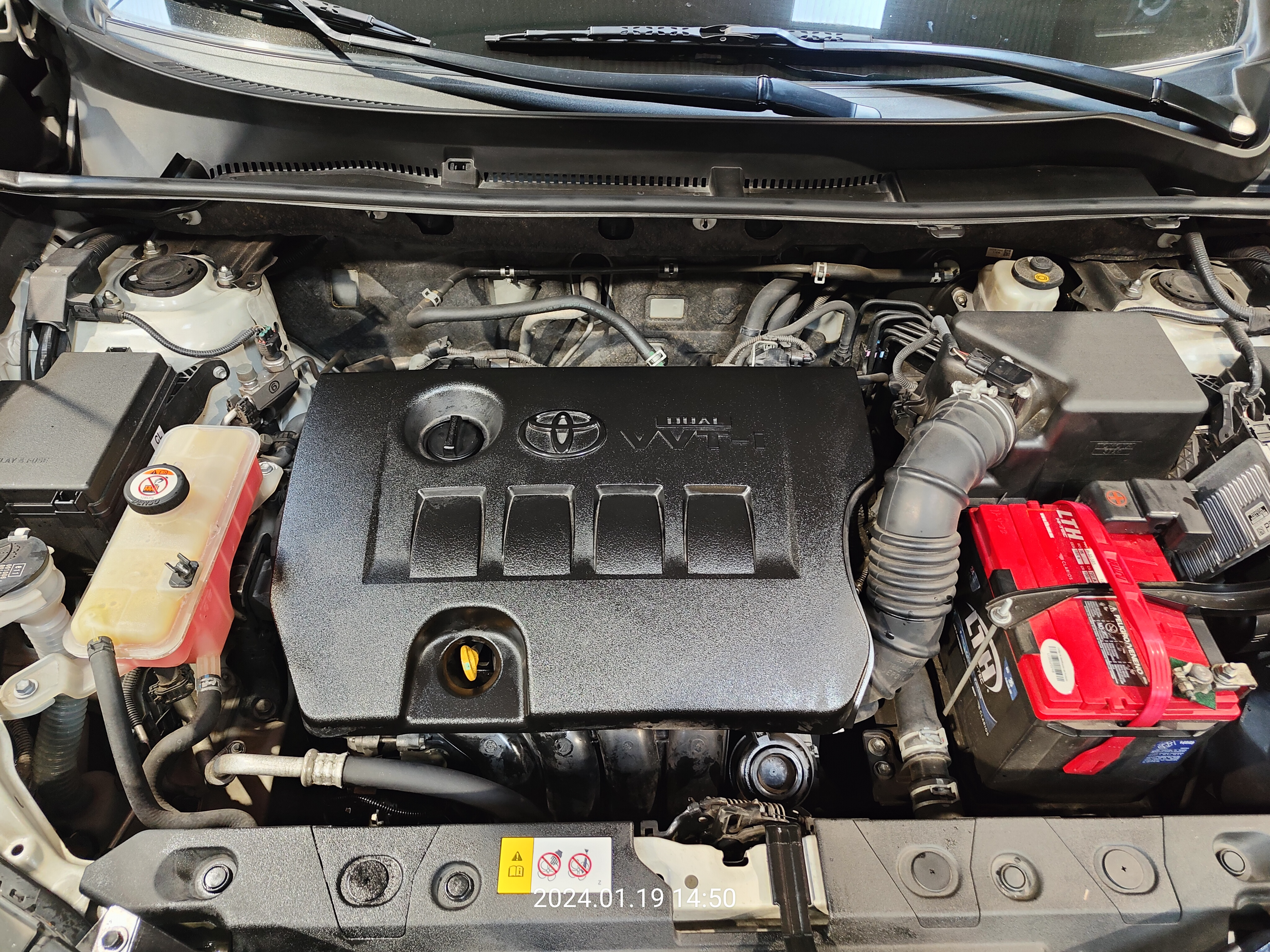
Toyota 3ZR-FE

The Toyota 3ZR-FE is a 2.0 L (1,986 cc) DOHC, 16-valve engine with Dual VVT-i.

Specifications

- Engine type : In-Line 4-cylinder DOHC 16-valve
- Bore x Stroke : 80.5 mm × 97.6 mm (3.17 in × 3.84 in)
- Compression Ratio : 10.0:1 (Japan)
- 143 PS (141 hp; 105 kW) at 5600 rpm (Japan)
- 142–153 PS (140–151 hp; 104–113 kW) at 5800 rpm (Brazil, Flex Fuel Version E22/E100 Fuel)
- 194 N⋅m (143.1 lb⋅ft; 19.8 kg⋅m) of torque at 3900 rpm (Japan)
- 194–203 N⋅m (143.1–149.7 lb⋅ft; 19.8–20.7 kg⋅m) @ 4000 rpm (Brazil, Flex Fuel Version E22/E100 Fuel)
- 13.4 km/L (37.9 mpg_{‑imp}; 31.5 mpg_{‑US}) fuel consumption (10-15 Japanese test cycle: Toyota Voxy; Toyota Noah)

Applications

- 2007 Toyota Voxy (ZRR70/75)
- 2007 Toyota Noah (ZRR70/75)
- Toyota Avensis (ZRT272) (ex. Europe)
- 2009 Toyota Corolla Altis (ZRE143) (Asia-Pacific ex. Japan)
- 2010 Toyota Corolla XEi (E150) (Brazil)
- 2013 Toyota RAV4 (ZSA42L/44L)
- 2013 Toyota Corolla (E170) (Middle East)

=== TOMS Toyota TZR42 ===
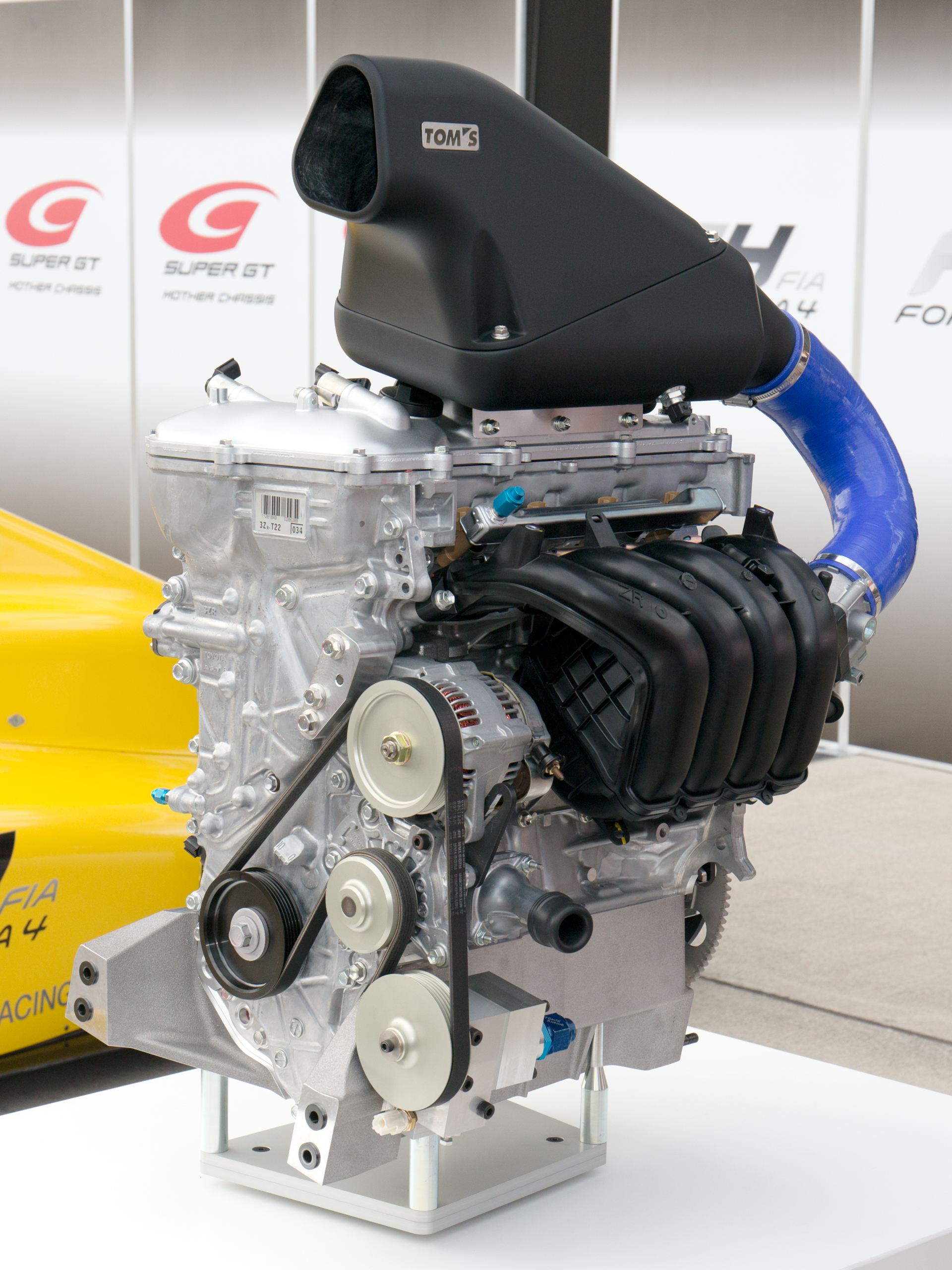
TOMS Toyota TZR42 on display at Suzuka

Used in the Formula 4 class, the TOMS Toyota TZR42 is the racing version of the production 3ZR-FE powering the Dome F110 Formula 4 car.

== 3ZR-FAE ==
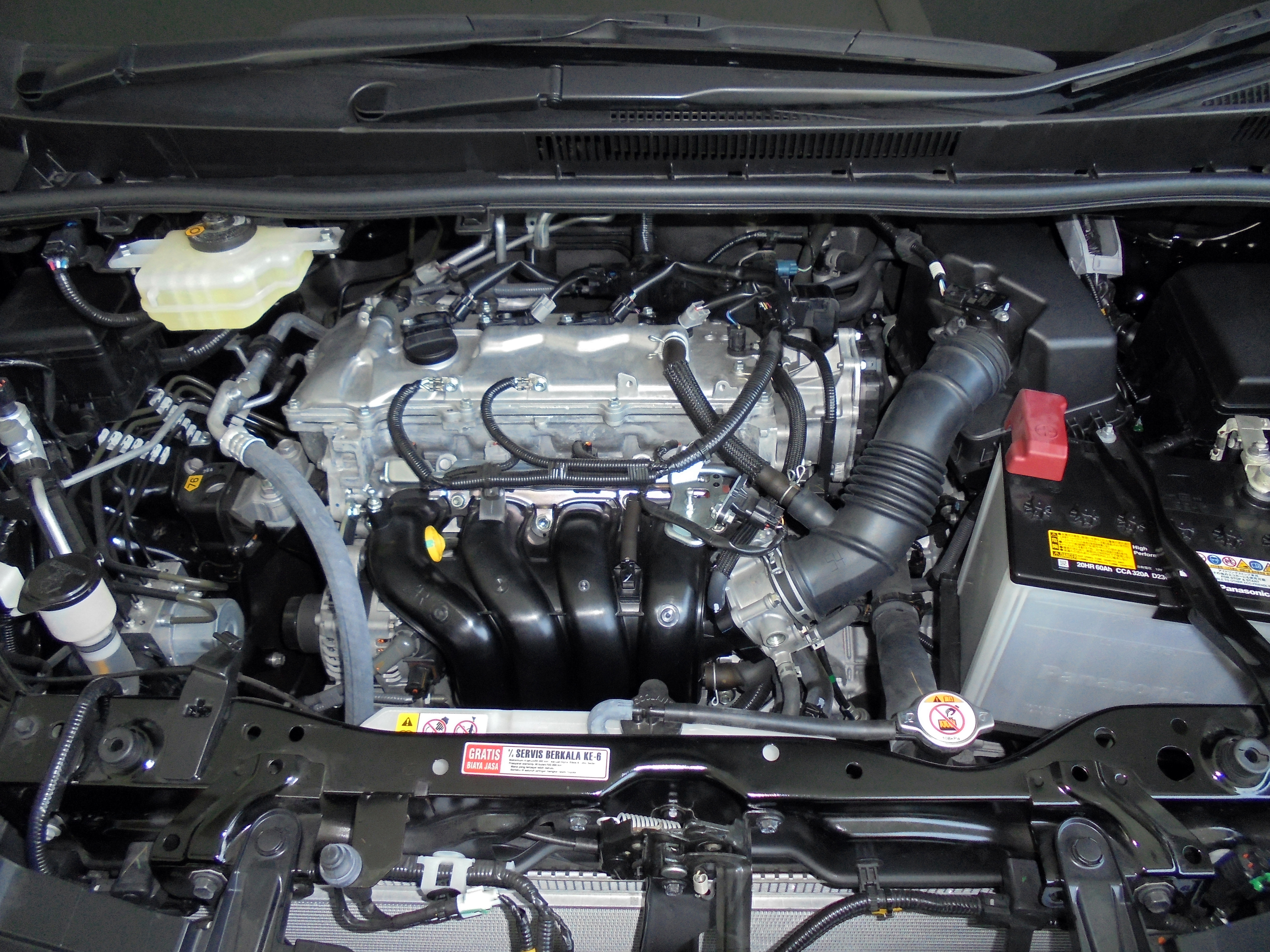
3ZR-FAE

The 3ZR-FAE is a 2.0 L (1,986 cc) DOHC, 16-valve engine that was first used in 2007. It is Toyota's first engine with the Valvematic variable lift intake system.

Specifications

- Engine type : In-Line 4-cylinder DOHC 16-valve
- Bore x Stroke : 80.5 mm × 97.6 mm (3.17 in × 3.84 in)
- Compression Ratio : 10.0:1
- 158 PS (116 kW; 156 hp) at 6200 rpm
- 144 lb⋅ft (195 N⋅m) of torque 4400 rpm

Applications

- Toyota Allion (ZRT261)
- Toyota Premio (ZRT261)
- Toyota RAV4 (ZSA30/35) (Europe and Central America)
- Toyota Avensis (ZRT272)
- Toyota Wish (ZGE21/22)
- Toyota Noah/Voxy (ZRR70/75)
- Toyota C-HR (ZGX10) (US and Canada only)
- Toyota Harrier (Japan)
- Lexus NX 200 (China, Taiwan & Russia)

== 3ZR-FBE ==
A flex fuel version of the 3ZR-FE was released in March 2010 in Brazil with 142 PS (104 kW; 140 bhp) when running on petrol, and 153 PS (113 kW; 151 bhp) on ethanol .

Applications

- Toyota Corolla (Brazil, 2010-2019)

== 4ZR-FE ==
The Toyota 4ZR-FE is a 1.6 L (1,598 cc) DOHC, 16-valve engine with Dual VVT-i. Output for this engine is rated at 117 hp (87 kW; 119 PS) at 6000 rpm and 150 N⋅m (111 lb⋅ft) of torque at 4400 rpm. It is an analogue of the 1ZR-FE for use in China only.

Applications

- Toyota Corolla EX (ZRE120) (China only)
- Toyota Yaris (ZSP91) (China only)
- Toyota Vios (ZSP92) (China only)

== 5ZR-FXE ==
The Toyota 5ZR-FXE is a 1.8 L (1,797 cc) Atkinson cycle engine paired with electric motor/generators in a hybrid drive system. This engine is an analogue of the 2ZR-FXE for use in China only.

Specifications

- Type: inline 4 cylinder DOHC 16 valve VVT-i Atkinson cycle
- Exhaust volume: 1.8 L (1,798 cc)
- Bore x stroke: 80.5 mm × 88.3 mm (3.17 in × 3.48 in)
- Compression ratio: 13.0:1
- Output: 73 kW (99 PS; 98 hp) at 5,200 rpm; torque: 142 N⋅m (14 kg⋅m; 105 lb⋅ft) at 4,000 rpm

Applications

- Prius (China variants)
- CT200h (China variants)

Specification is similar to 2ZR-FXE & a region-coded model due to various reasons.

== 6ZR-FE ==
The Toyota 6ZR-FE is a 2.0 L (1,986 cc) DOHC, 16-valve engine with Dual VVT-i. It is an analogue of the 3ZR-FE for use in China only.

Specifications

- Engine type : In-Line 4-cylinder DOHC 16-valve
- Bore x Stroke : 80.5 mm × 97.6 mm (3.17 in × 3.84 in)
- Compression Ratio : 10.0:1
- 143 PS (141 hp; 105 kW) at 5600 rpm
- 194 N⋅m (143.1 lb⋅ft; 19.8 kg⋅m) of torque at 3900 rpm

Applications

- RAV4 (China)

== 6ZR-FAE ==
The 6ZR-FAE is a 2.0 L (1,986 cc) DOHC, 16-valve engine. It has Toyota's Valvematic variable lift intake system. It is an analogue of the 3ZR-FAE for use in China only.

Specifications

- Engine type : In-Line 4-cylinder DOHC 16-valve
- Bore x Stroke : 80.5 mm × 97.6 mm (3.17 in × 3.84 in)
- Compression Ratio : 10.0:1
- 158 PS (116 kW; 156 hp) at 6200 rpm
- 144 lb⋅ft (195 N⋅m) of torque 4400 rpm

Applications

- RAV4 (China)

== 7ZR-FE ==
The Toyota 7ZR-FE is a DOHC, 16-valve, 1.8 L (1,798 cc) engine also equipped with Dual VVT-i. It is an analogue of the 2ZR-FE for China only.

Specifications

- Engine Type : In-Line 4-cylinder DOHC 16-valve
- Bore × Stroke = 80.5 mm × 88.3 mm (3.17 in × 3.48 in)
- Compression Ratio : 10.0:1

Applications

- Toyota Levin (E180)

== 8ZR-FXE ==
The Toyota 8ZR-FXE is a 1.8 L (1,797 cc) Atkinson cycle engine paired with electric motor/generators in a hybrid drive system. It is an analogue of the 2ZR-FXE for use in China only.

Specifications

- Type: inline 4 cylinder DOHC 16 valve VVT-i Atkinson cycle
- Exhaust volume: 1.8 L (1,798 cc)
- Bore x stroke: 80.5 mm × 88.3 mm (3.17 in × 3.48 in)
- Compression ratio: 13.0:1
- Output: 73 kW (99 PS; 98 hp) at 5,200 rpm; torque: 142 N⋅m (14 kg⋅m; 105 lb⋅ft) at 4,000 rpm

Applications

- Toyota Corolla (E180) hybrid (China variants)
- Toyota Levin (E180) hybrid (China variants)

== Production ==
The 1.6 L and 1.8 L ZR engines are built in Tianjin FAW Toyota Engine Co., Ltd. (TFTE) Plant No. 2, beginning in April 2007 and in the West Virginia Plant for Corolla's production in the United States and Canada. The 1.8L Hybrid FXE engines are built in Toyota's Deeside engine manufacturing plant in the UK and shipped to their Burnaston, UK plant to be fitted into the Corolla Hatch and Touring Sport versions. The plant also supplies these engine parts to Toyota's assembly lines in France, Turkey, South Africa and Japan.

== See also ==
- List of Toyota engines
- List of Toyota transmissions
