= Toyota Motor Manufacturing Türkiye =

Car Manufacturing Company

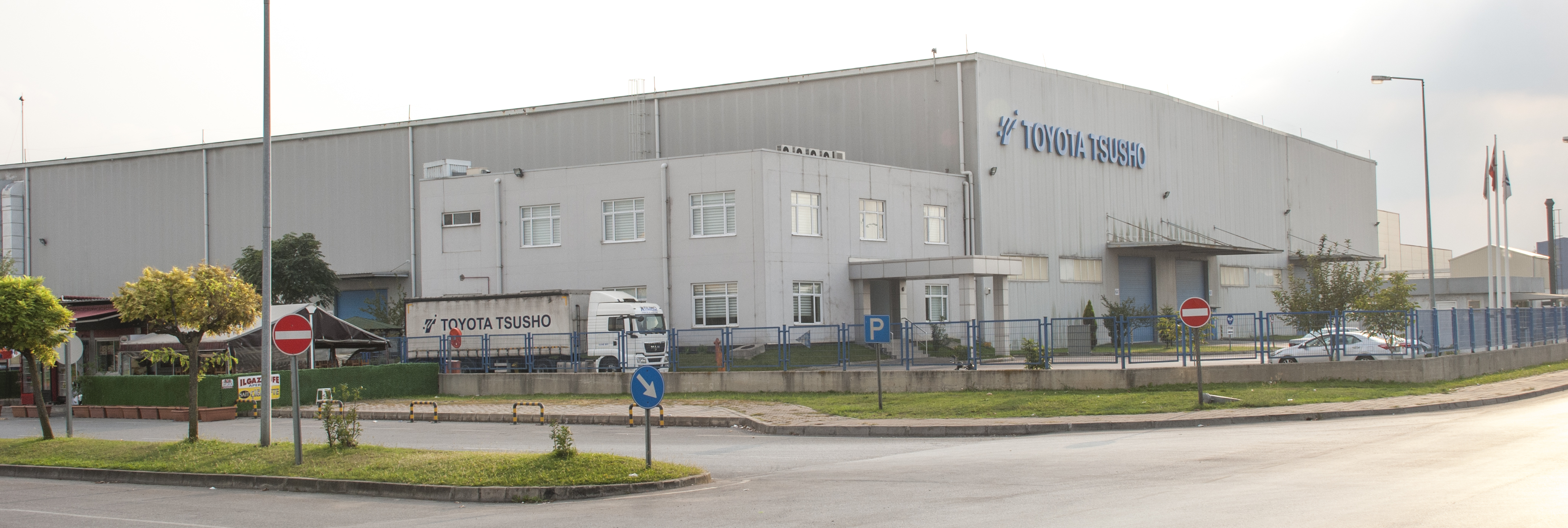
- TMMT plant
- Company type: Subsidiary
- Industry: Automotive
- Founded: 1998; 28 years ago
- Headquarters: Adapazarı, Sakarya
- Area served: Worldwide
- Key people: Toshihiko Kudo, CEO
- Products: Automobiles
- Production output: 215,645 Vehicles (2024)
- Revenue: US$5.20 billion (2023)
- Operating income: US$521 million (2023)
- Number of employees: 5,068 (2023)
- Parent: Toyota Europe
- Website: www.toyotatr.com

Toyota Motor Manufacturing Türkiye (TMMT) is one of Toyota's vehicle production bases in Europe. It is located in Adapazarı, Sakarya, Turkey, and has been manufacturing the Corolla (since 1994), the Corolla Verso, the Verso (2009–2018), the Auris (2007–2012), and the Toyota C-HR (2016–present). A majority of the production is exported to over 30 countries, most of which are in Europe.

TMMT, owned by Toyota Motor Europe NV/SA (90%), and Mitsui & Co., Ltd. (10%), has a total investment of €212 billion, and currently employs around 5,400 people.

Today, with an annual production capacity of 280,000 units, Toyota Motor Manufacturing Turkey (TMMT) is one of Toyota's biggest plants in Europe operations, and one of Turkey's biggest manufacturing companies.

== Current production ==
- Corolla (1994–present)
- C-HR (2016–present)

== Former production ==
- Auris (2007–2012)
- Verso (2009–2018)
