= Toyota Corolla Verso =

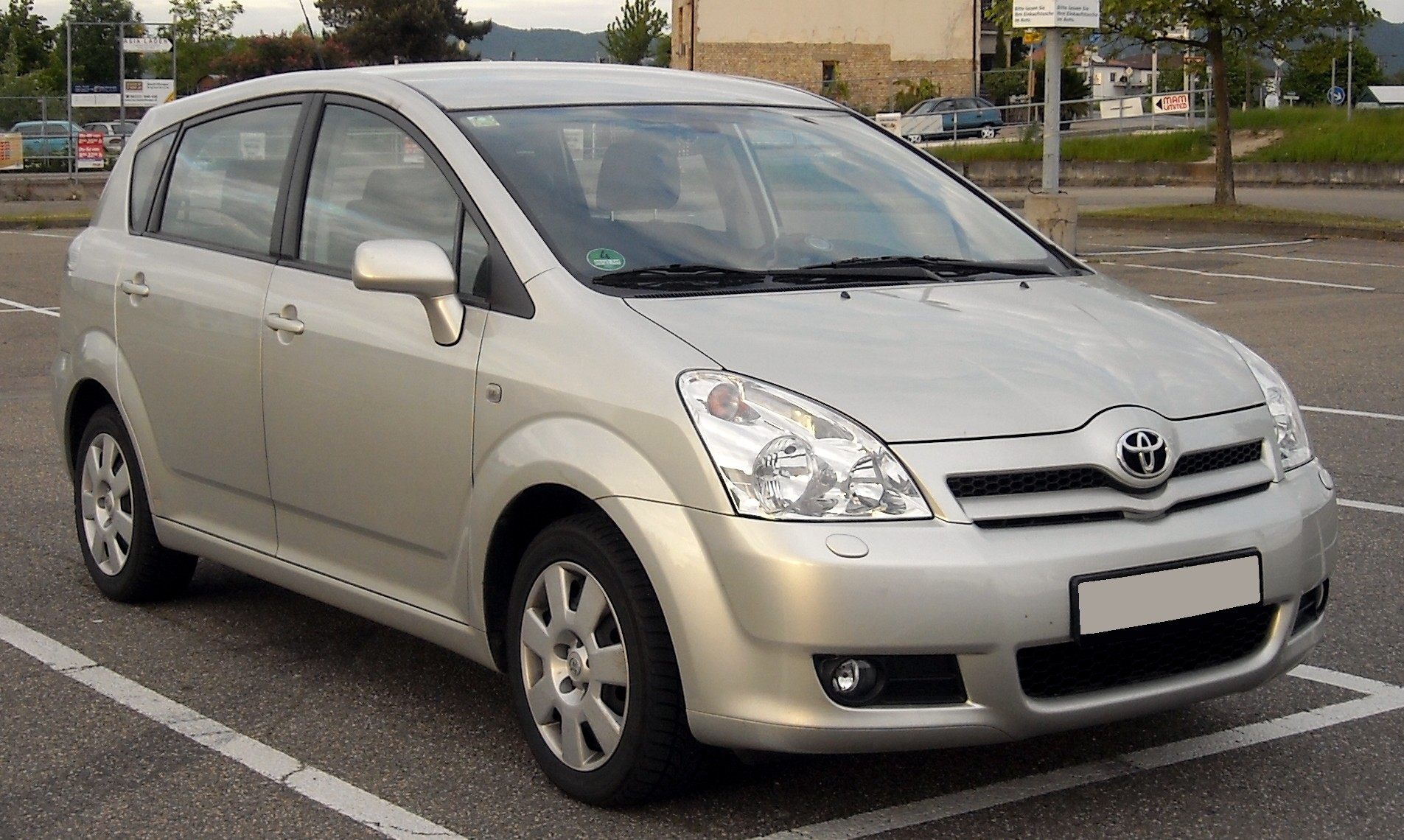
- Toyota Corolla Verso (AUR10, Germany)

Overview
- Manufacturer: Toyota
- Production: 2001-2009

Body and chassis
- Class: Compact MPV
- Body style: 5-door MPV

Chronology
- Predecessor: Toyota Corolla Spacio
- Successor: Toyota Verso

The Toyota Corolla Verso is a car produced by the Japanese carmaker Toyota between 2001 and 2010. A compact MPV, the first-generation Corolla Verso sold in Toyota Motor Europe was a rebadged Japanese domestic market second-generation Corolla Spacio (E120), which was first released in Japan in May 2001. The second-generation model became a separate model in March 2004, based on the second-generation Avensis (T250), until production ceased in February 2010, and production of its replacement, the Verso, began.

Although the design of the car is based on the Verso's namesake, the Corolla, the second-generation model does not share a platform with the Corolla, instead being built on a separate unique platform.

== First generation (E120; 2001) ==
First generation (E120)
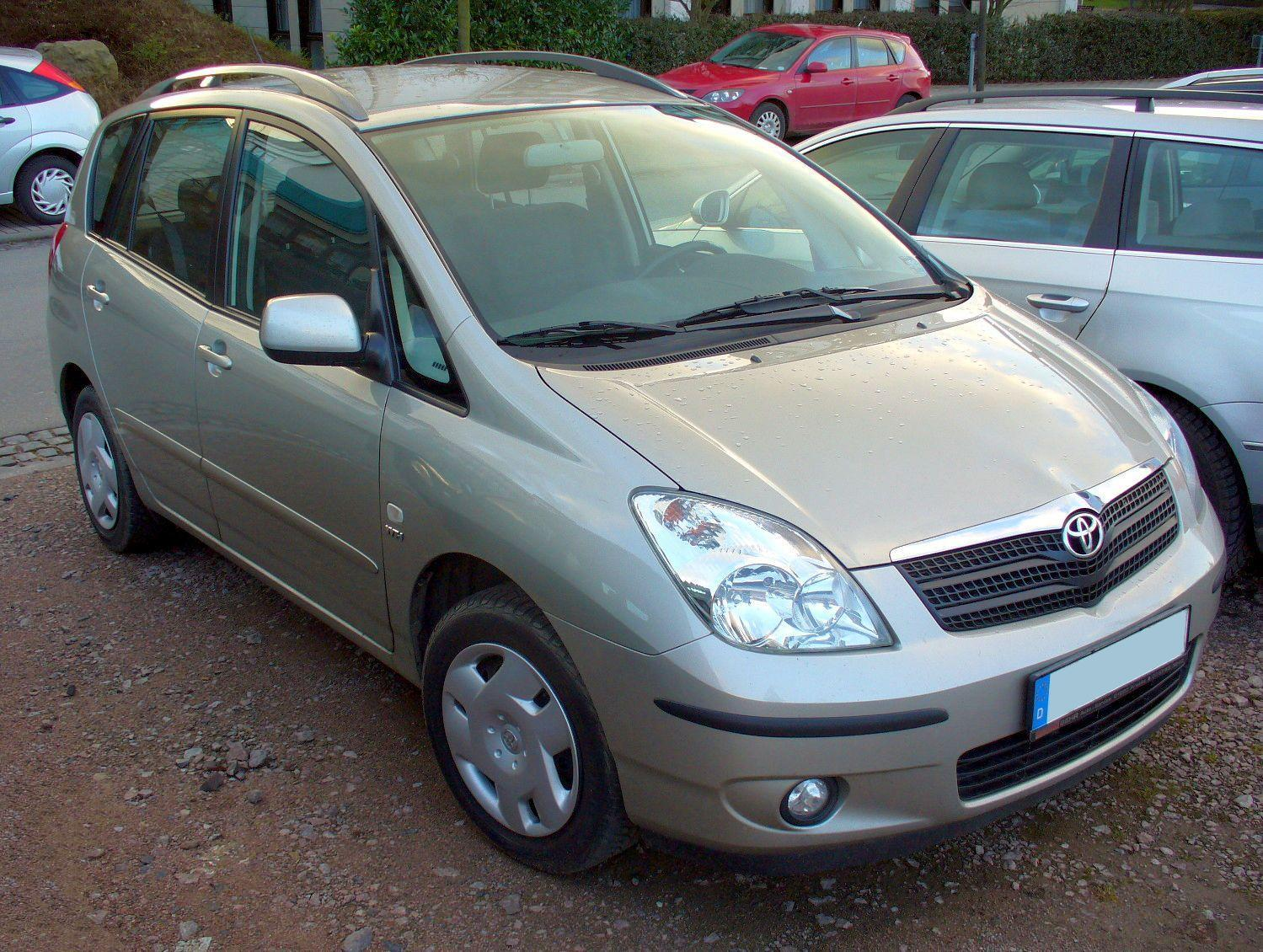
- Corolla Verso (Germany)

Overview
- Also called: Toyota Corolla Spacio (JDM)
- Production: 2001–2004
- Assembly: Japan: Susono, Shizuoka (Kanto Auto Works)

Body and chassis
- Platform: Toyota MC platform
- Related: Toyota Corolla (E120)

Powertrain
- Engine: Petrol: 1.6 L 3ZZ-FE VVT-i I4; 1.8 L 1ZZ-FE VVT-i I4; Diesel: 2.0 L 1CD-FTV Common rail turbo I4
- Transmission: 5-speed manual; 4-speed automatic

Dimensions
- Wheelbase: 2,600 mm (102.4 in)
- Length: 4,260–4,275 mm (167.7–168.3 in)
- Width: 1,695 mm (66.7 in)
- Height: 1,610–1,620 mm (63.4–63.8 in)
- Curb weight: 1,190–1,320 kg (2,624–2,910 lb)

The second generation Corolla Spacio entered the European market as the first generation Corolla Verso after being shown at the September 2001 Frankfurt Motor Show.

In the United Kingdom, the first generation Corolla Verso was launched on 2 January 2002, along with the E120 series Corolla. It was available in T2 grade with the 1.6-litre 3ZZ-FE petrol engine, as well as T3 and T Spirit grade levels with the 1.8-litre 1ZZ-FE petrol engine. 2.0-litre 1CD-FTV diesel engine was also available for all grades. A 5-speed manual transmission was standard fitment on all grades, with a 4-speed automatic option available only on the 1.8-litre petrol-powered T3 and T Spirit grades. The European market Corolla Verso was only available as a two-row, five-seater.

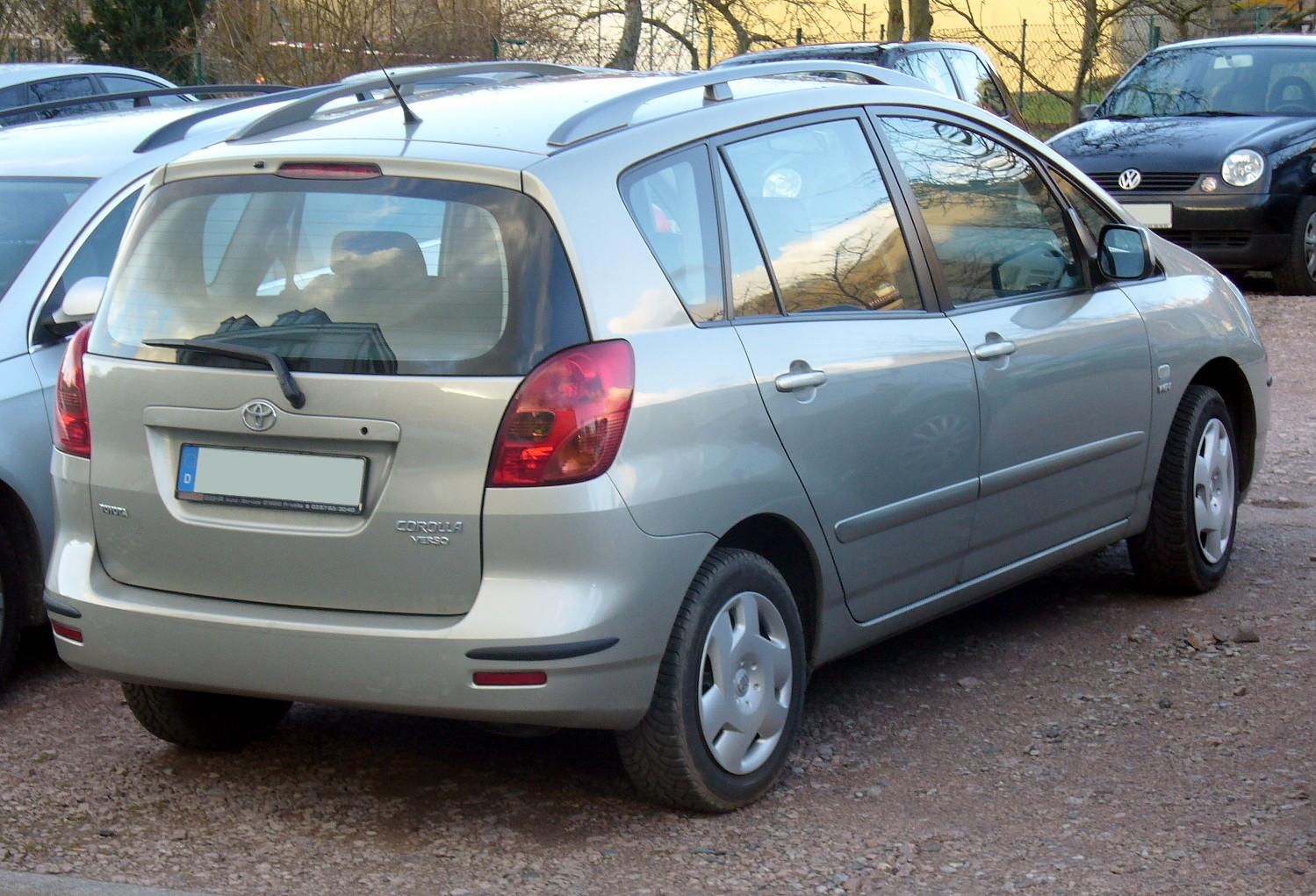
Corolla Verso (Germany; rear view)

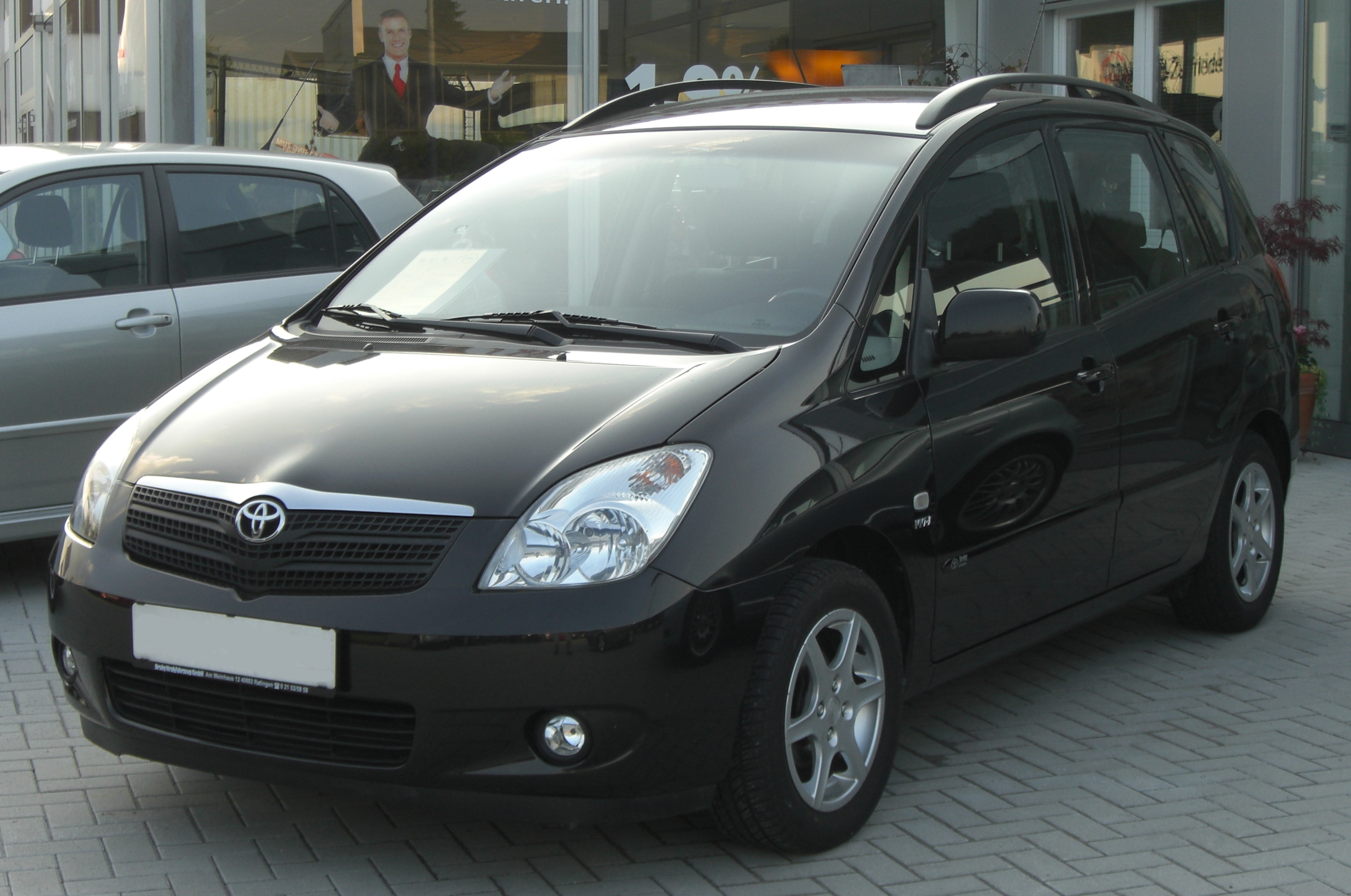
Corolla Verso (Germany; front view)

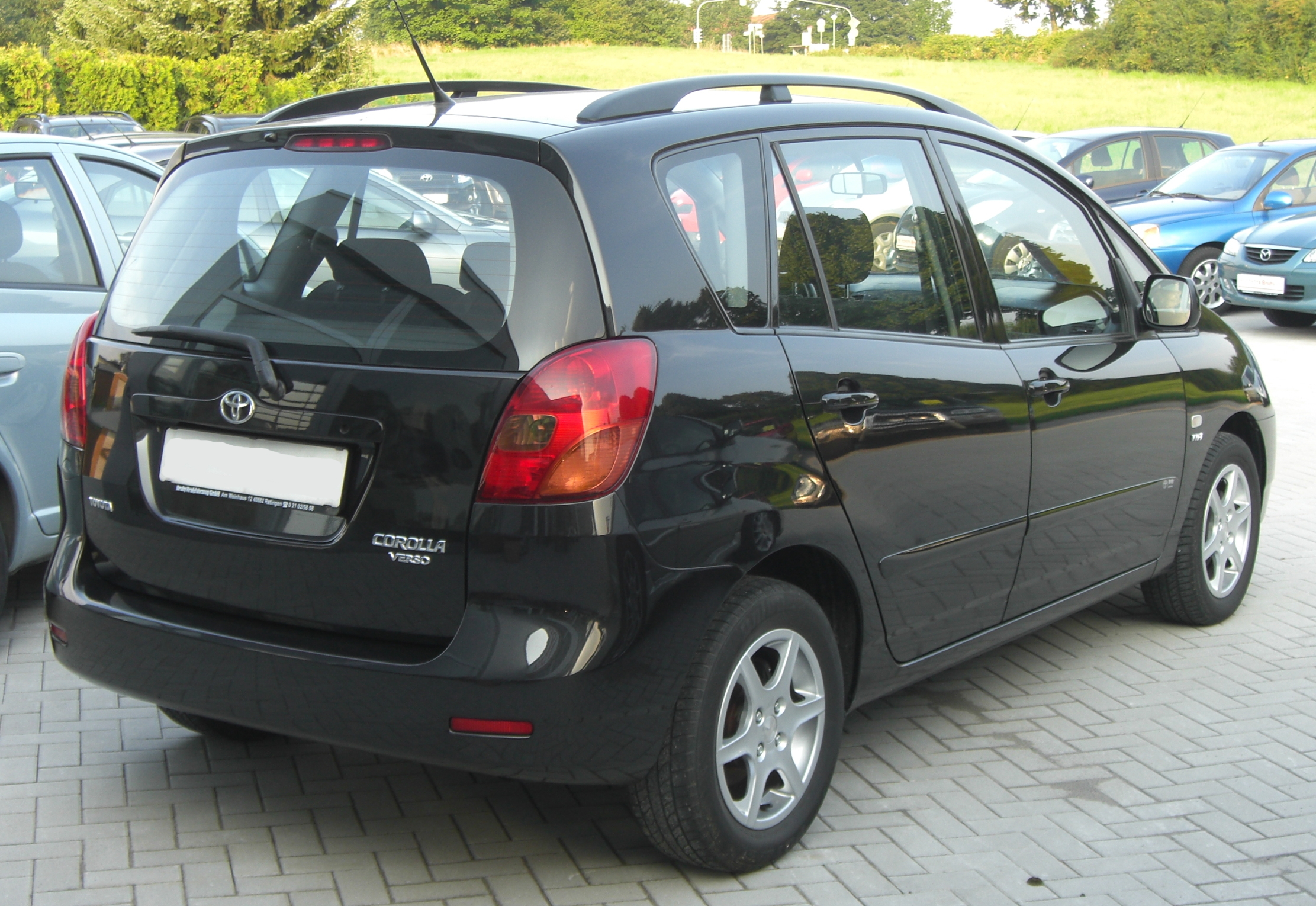
Corolla Verso (Germany; rear view)

== Second generation (AR10; 2004) ==
Second generation (AR10)
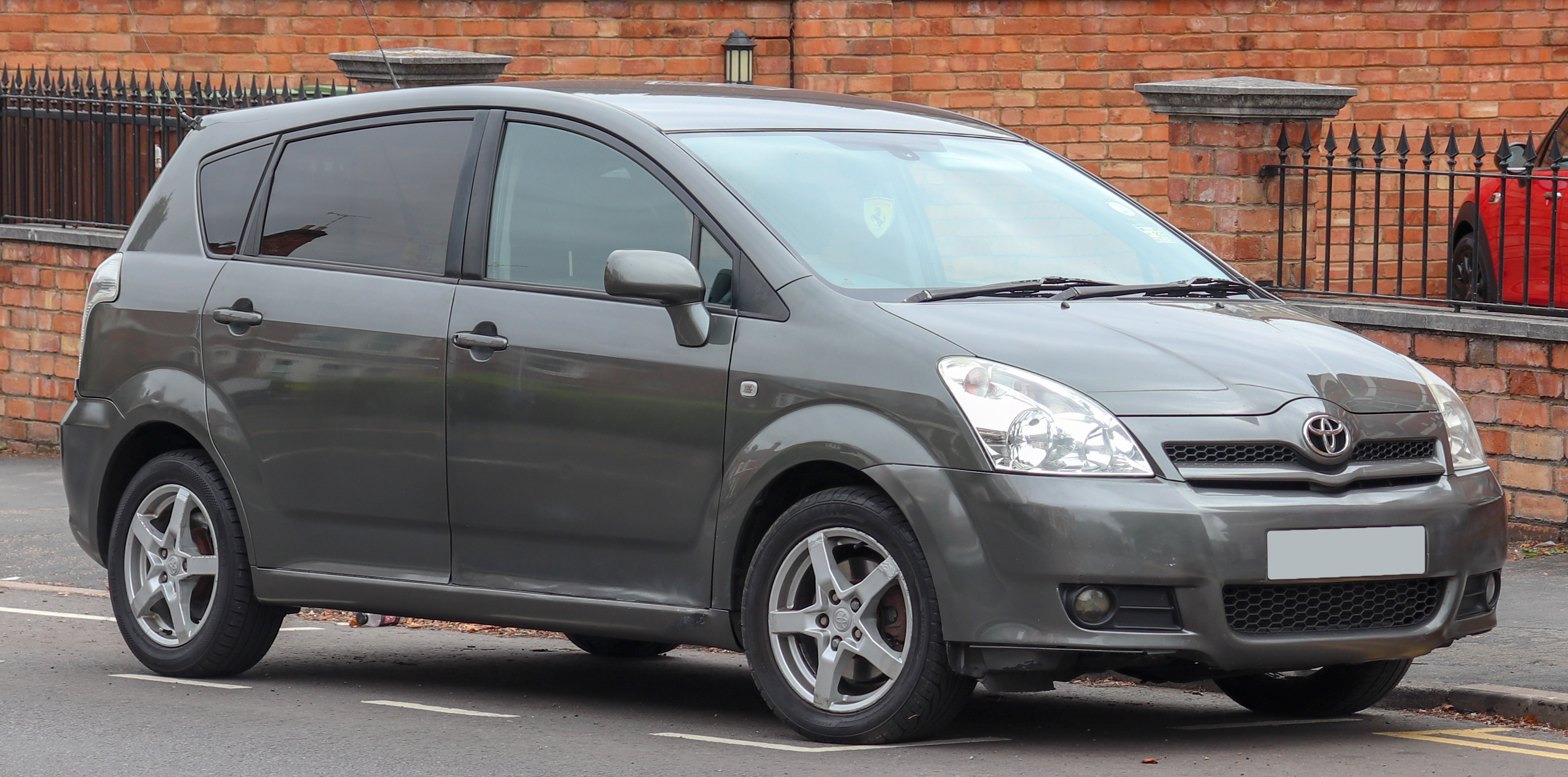
- Corolla Verso TR (UK; pre-facelift)

Overview
- Also called: Toyota SportsVan (Denmark); Toyota Verso (Netherlands)
- Production: 2004–2010
- Assembly: Turkey: Arifiye, Sakarya Province (TMMT)
- Designer: Elvio D'Aprile

Body and chassis
- Layout: Front-engine, front-wheel-drive
- Platform: Toyota MC platform
- Related: Toyota Avensis (T250)

Powertrain
- Engine: Petrol: 1.6 L 3ZZ-FE VVT-i I4 (ZNR10); 1.8 L 1ZZ-FE VVT-i I4 (ZNR11); Diesel: 2.0 L 1AD-FTV CR turbo I4 (AUR10); 2.2 L 2AD-FTV CR turbo I4 (AUR10)
- Transmission: 5/6-speed manual; MultiMode automated manual

Dimensions
- Wheelbase: 2,750 mm (108.3 in)
- Length: 4,360 mm (171.7 in)
- Width: 1,770 mm (69.7 in)
- Height: 1,620 mm (63.8 in)

The second generation Corolla Verso was unveiled at the 2004 Geneva Motor Show.

Being internally coded as the AR10 platform (AUR10 with AD engine, ZNR10 with 3ZZ engine, ZNR10 with 1ZZ engine), the second generation Corolla Verso was one of the first Toyota vehicles to be designed outside Japan assembled in Arifiye, Sakarya, Turkey, and designed at Toyota's European design centre in the south of France.

This generation was designed by Toyota Europe Design Development (Sophia Antipolis, France) and primarily aimed at the European market, where it became one of the best selling compact MPVs.

The second generation Corolla Verso was offered with four choices of engines; a 1.6- and a 1.8-litre petrol, a 2.0- or 2.2-litre diesel. The European specification Corolla Verso was available in Europe, Morocco, Kenya and South Africa. It was not sold in Japan at all.

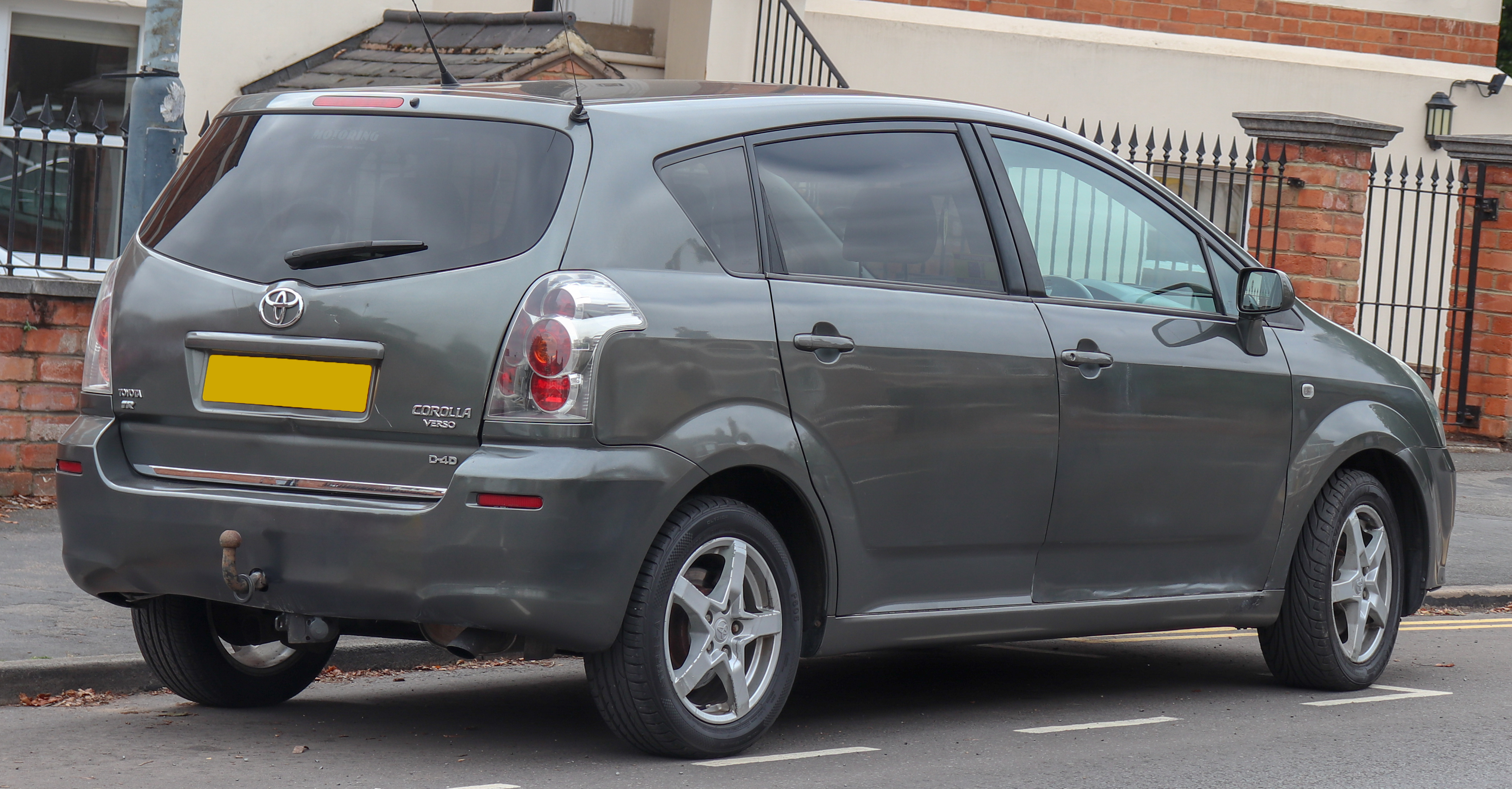
Corolla Verso TR (UK; pre-facelift)

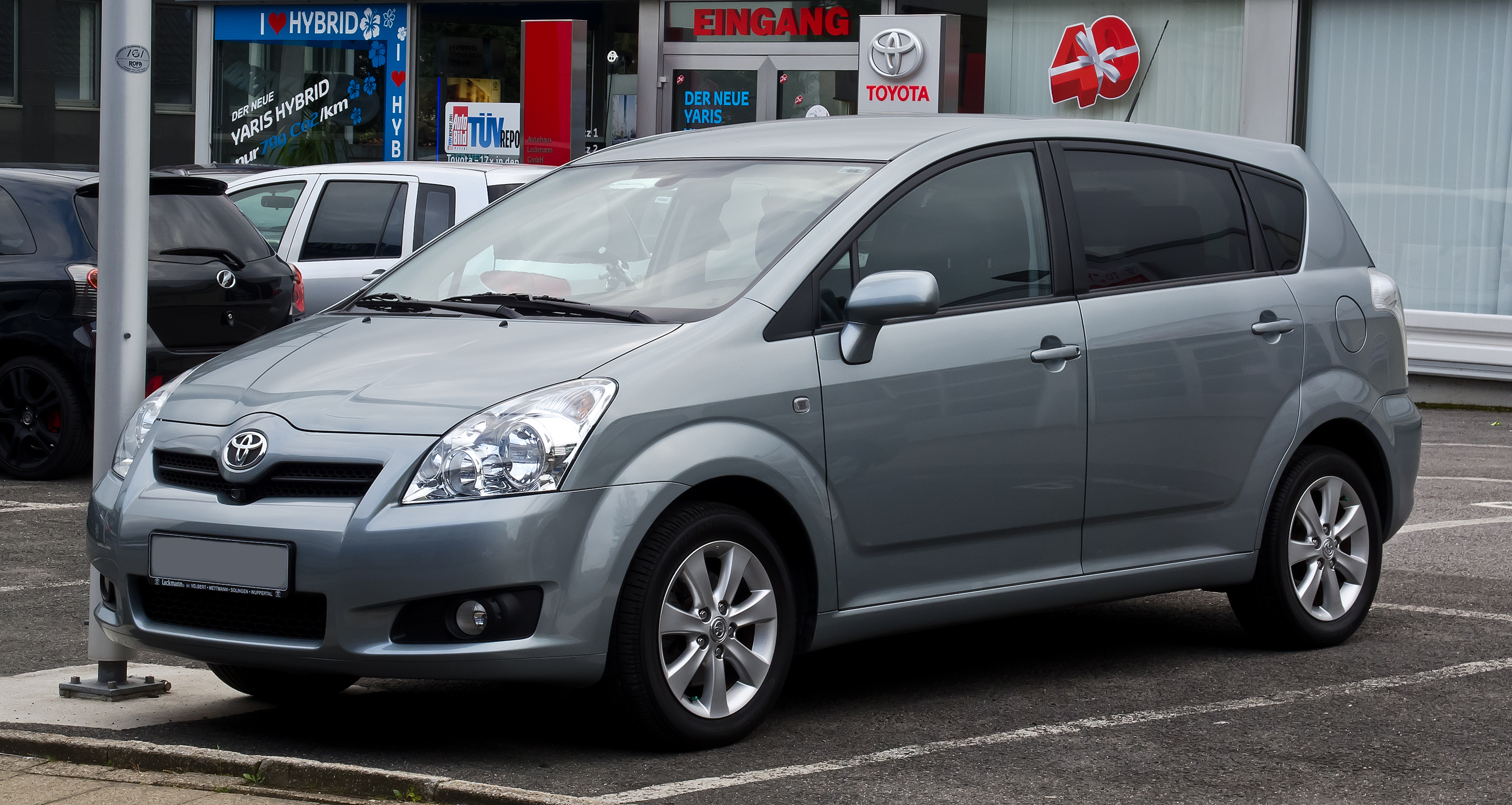
Corolla Verso (Germany; facelift)

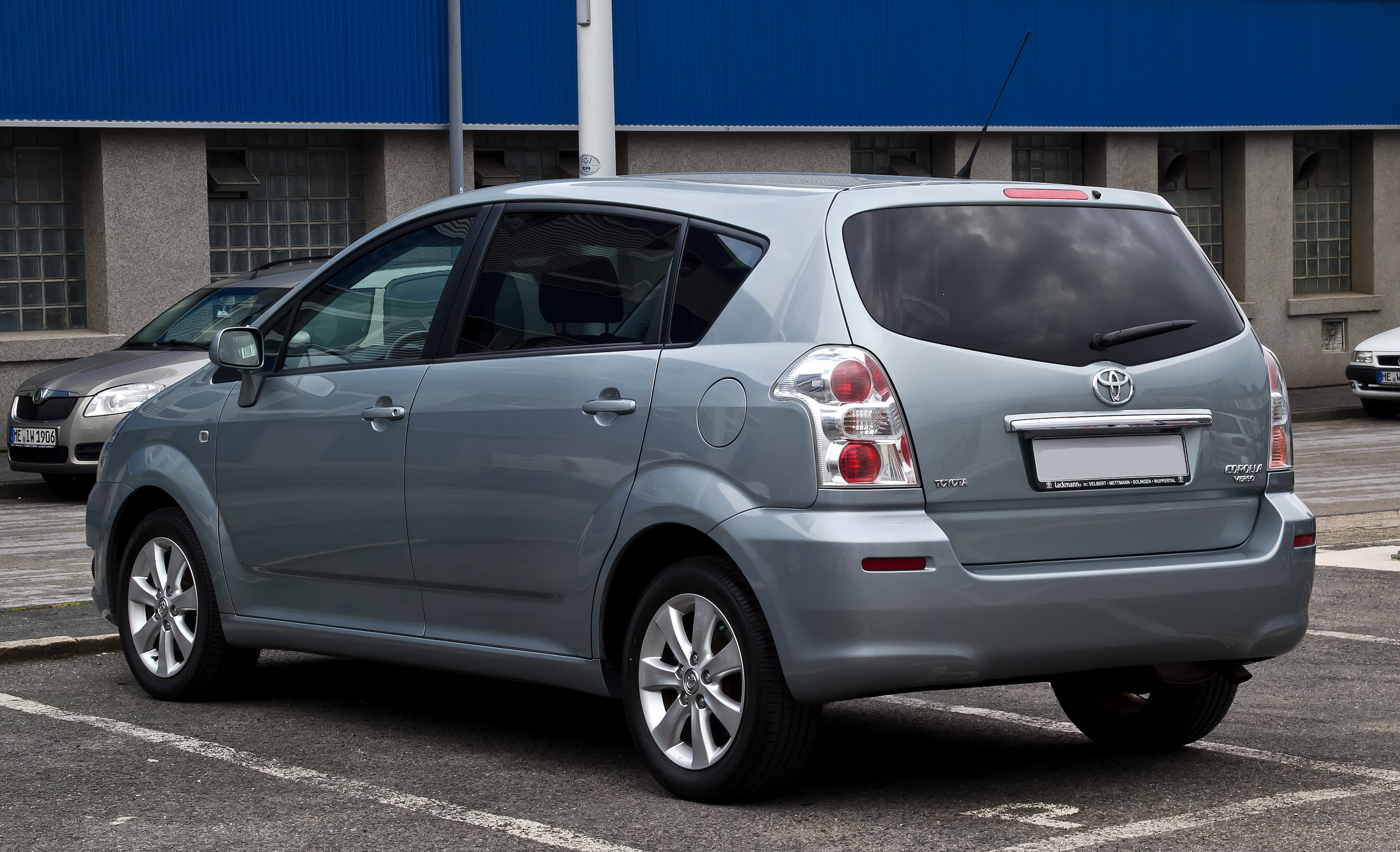
Corolla Verso (Germany; facelift)

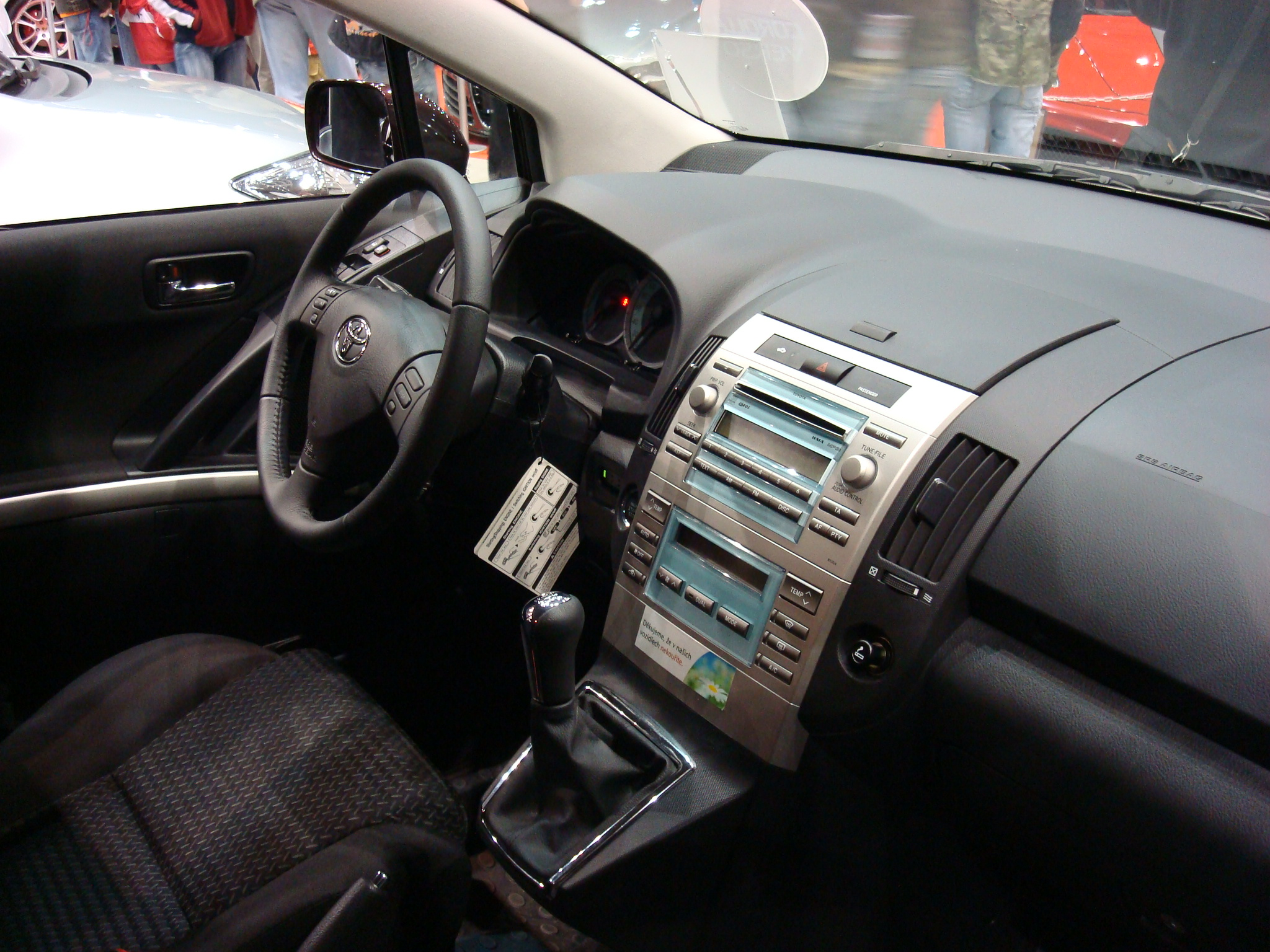
Interior

=== Safety ===
Euro NCAP test results LHD, five door estate (2004)
Test	Score	Rating
Adult occupant:	35	5 /5 stars
Child occupant:	37	4 /5 stars
Pedestrian:	11	2 /4 stars

The Euro NCAP test showed the Corolla Verso to have slightly higher side protection than the front in a crash.
