= Toyota Verso =

Toyota Verso (AR20)
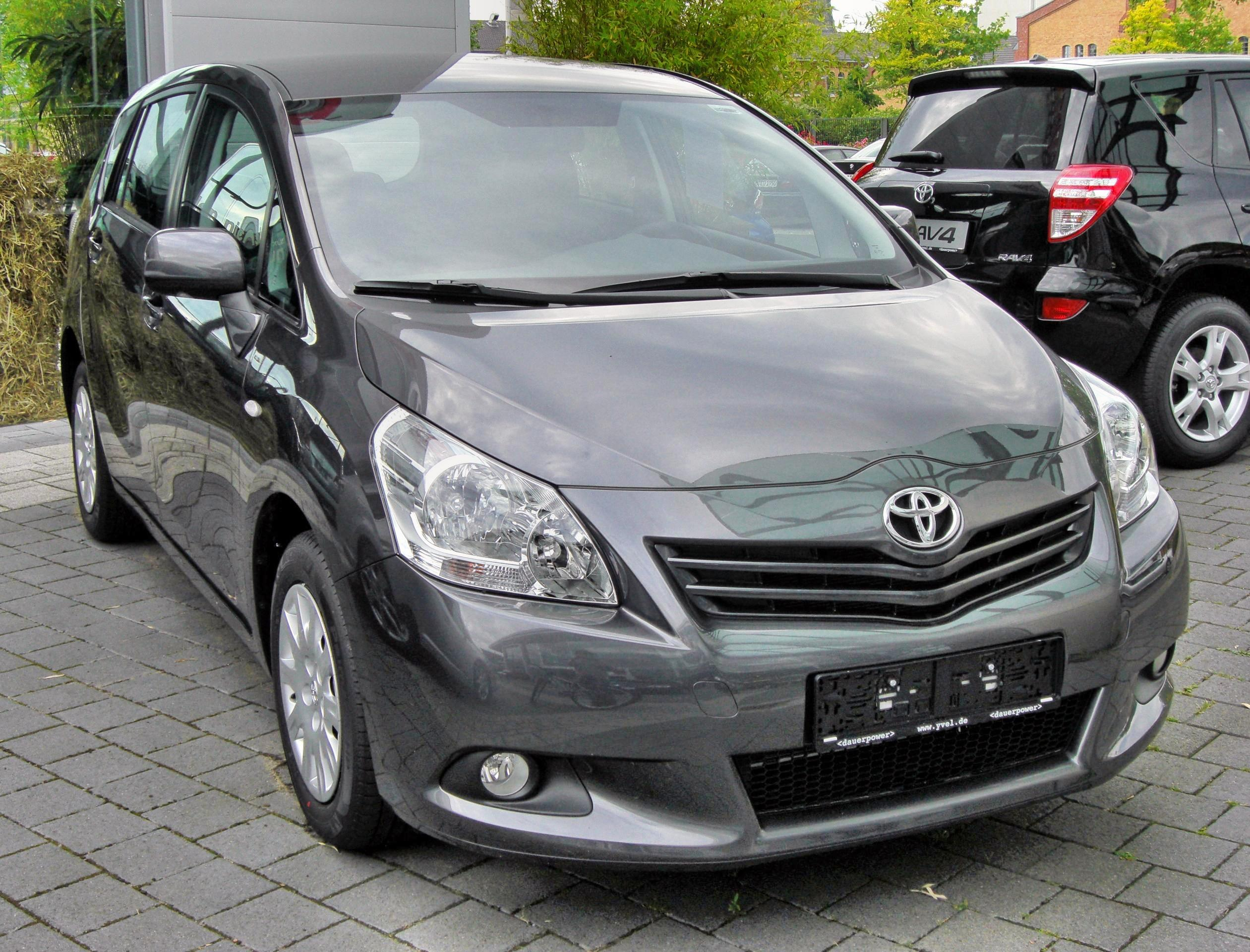
- Toyota Verso (Germany; pre-facelift)

Overview
- Manufacturer: Toyota
- Also called: Toyota E'Z (China); Toyota SportsVan (Denmark)
- Production: 2009–2018 (Toyota Motor Europe); 2011–2017 (China)
- Assembly: Turkey: Arifiye, Sakarya Province (TMMT); China: Guangzhou (GAC Toyota)

Body and chassis
- Class: Compact MPV
- Body style: 5-door MPV
- Layout: Front-engine, front-wheel-drive
- Platform: Toyota New MC platform
- Related: Toyota Corolla (E140); Toyota Corolla (E170); Toyota Auris

Powertrain
- Engine: Petrol: 1.6 L 1ZR-FE Valvematic I4; 1.8 L 2ZR-FE Valvematic I4; Diesel: 1.6 L 1WW D-4D turbo I4; 2.0 L 1AD-FTV D-4D turbo I4; 2.2 L 2AD-FTV D-4D turbo I4; 2.2 L 2AD-FHV D-CAT I4
- Transmission: 6-speed manual; Multidrive S

Dimensions
- Wheelbase: 2,780 mm (109.4 in)
- Length: 4,440–4,450 mm (174.8–175.2 in)
- Width: 1,790 mm (70.5 in)
- Height: 1,620–1,640 mm (63.8–64.6 in)

Chronology
- Predecessor: Toyota Corolla Verso; Toyota Avensis Verso/SportsVan
- Successor: Toyota ProAce City

The Toyota Verso is a compact MPV produced by the Japanese carmaker Toyota between 2009 and 2018 as the direct successor to the Corolla Verso and was available in five- or seven-seat configurations. It was positioned above the Verso-S/Space Verso in Toyota's European catalogue.

The "Verso" name is taken from the English word "versatility".

== Overview ==
The Verso was revealed at the 2009 Geneva Motor Show in March 2009. The Verso was marketed in Europe, Morocco, South Africa, China and Israel. It was not marketed in Japan, and not marketed in North America where the similar Matrix was offered instead. In South Africa, the only available diesel engine for the Verso range in South Africa is the 2.0L D-4D.

The facelifted Verso was revealed at the 2012 Paris Motor Show, alongside the E180 Auris. This facelift had the front fascia that is similar to the E180 Auris, and was designed by Mehmet Kiliç of Toyota ED2.

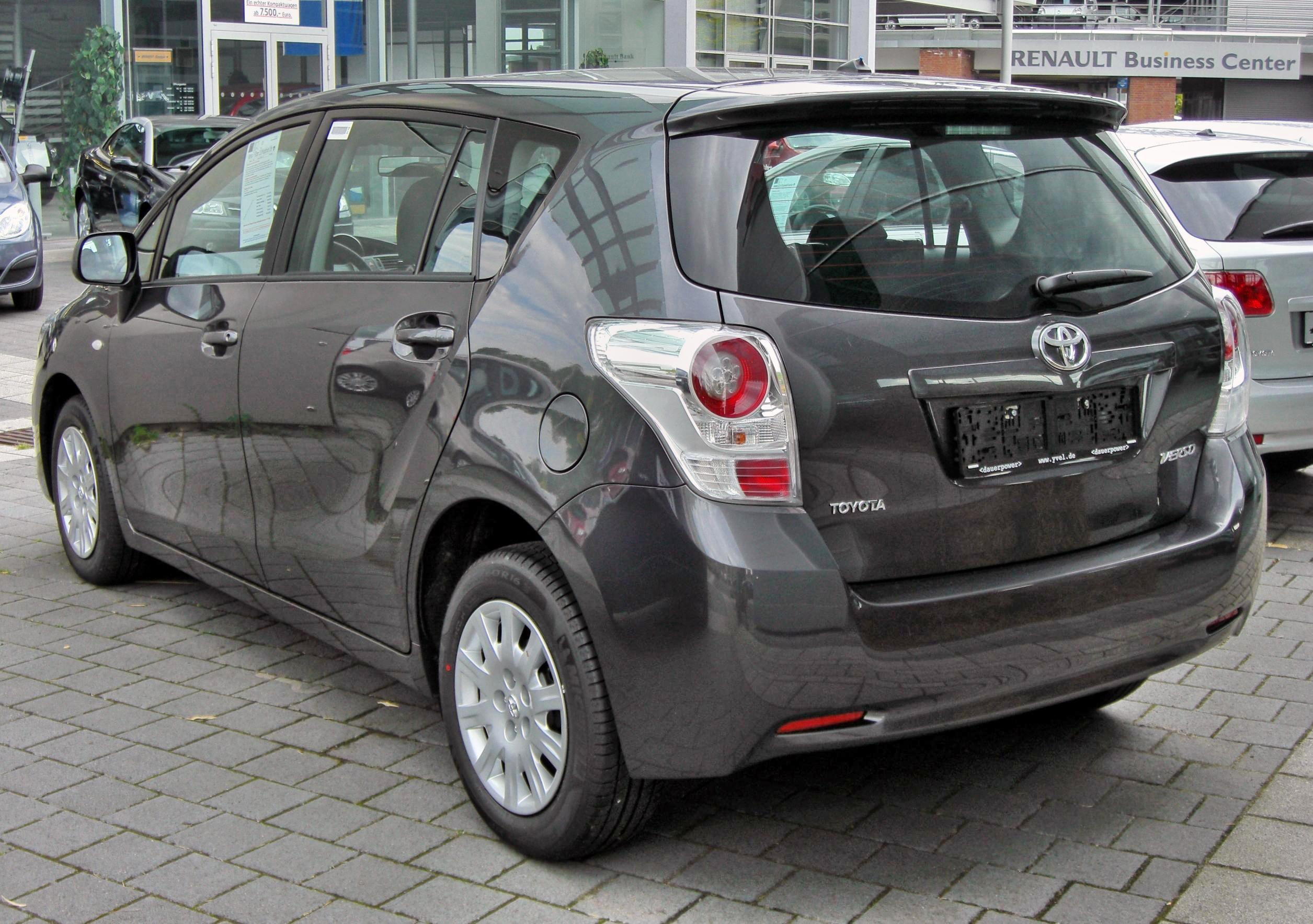
Toyota Verso (Germany; pre-facelift)

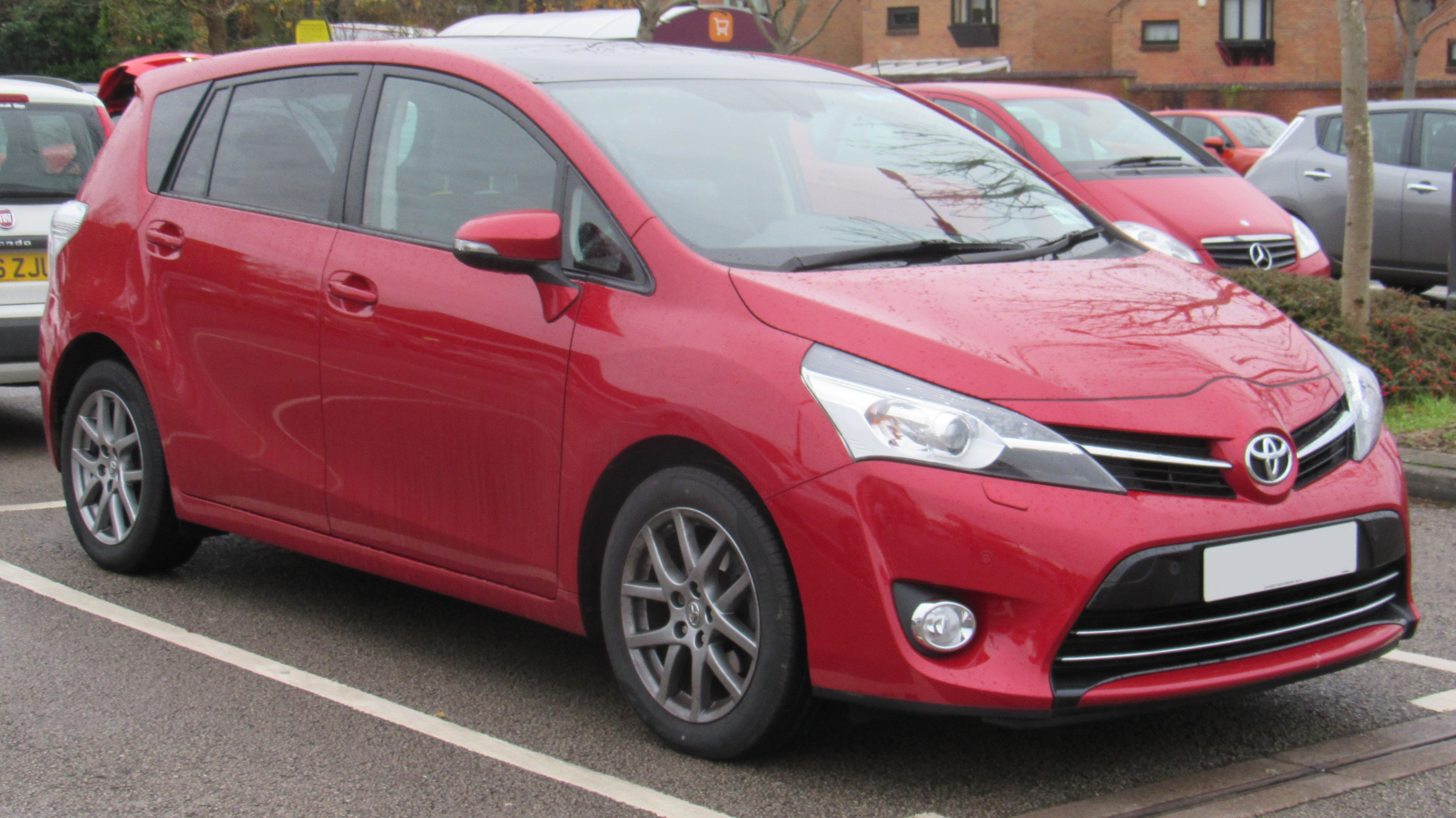
Toyota Verso Excel (UK; facelift)

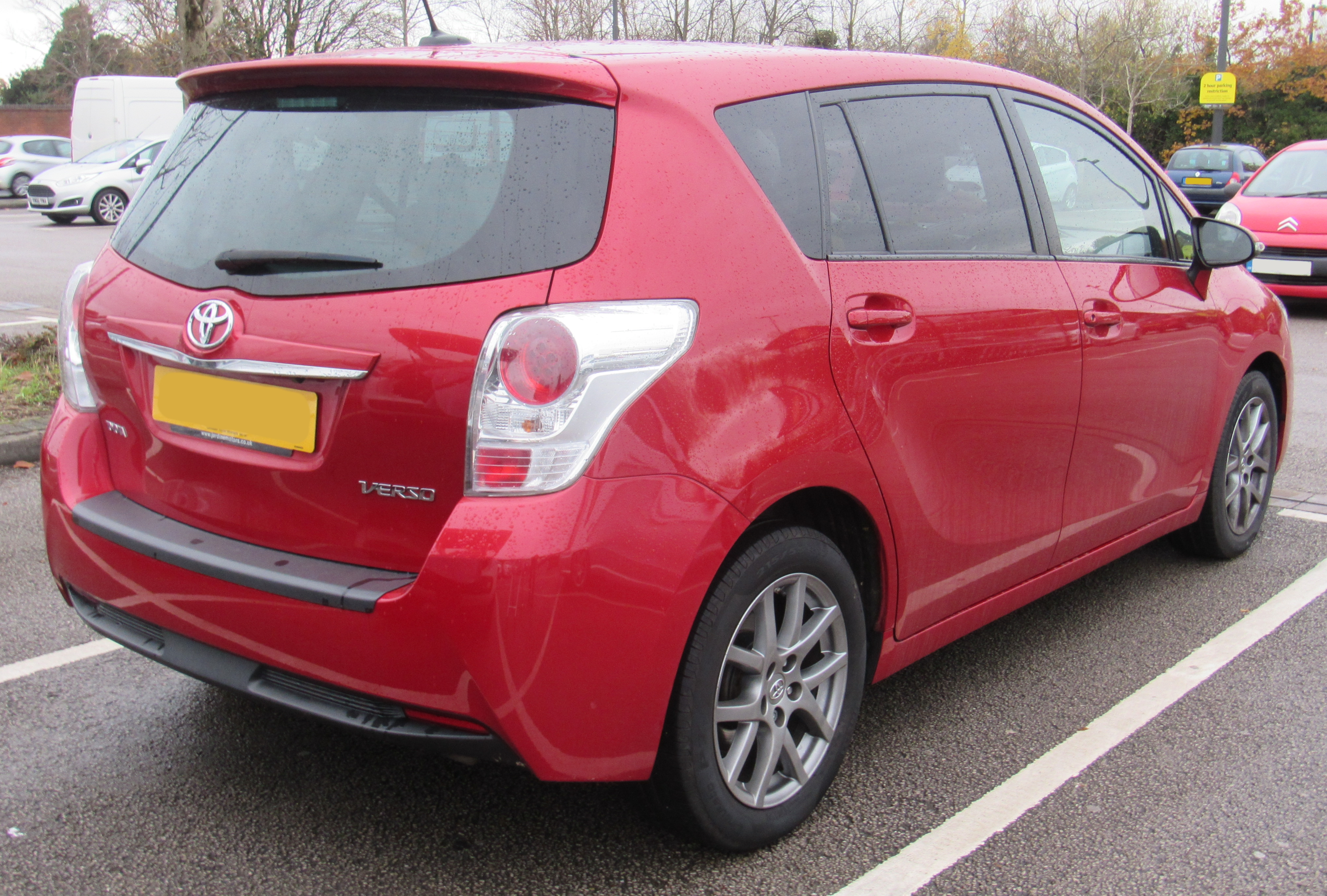
Toyota Verso Excel (UK; facelift)

== Safety ==
Euro NCAP test results for 2010 concluded that the Verso was the safest MPV.

Euro NCAP test results Toyota Verso LHD (2010)
Test	Points	%
Overall:	5 /5 stars	
Adult occupant:	32	89%
Child occupant:	37	75%
Pedestrian:	25	69%
Safety assist:	6	86%

== Toyota E'Z ==
The Toyota E'Z (Chinese: 逸致; pinyin: Yìzhì) is a Chinese built version of the Verso. Produced and marketed by GAC Toyota, it entered production in 2011 and discontinued in 2017.

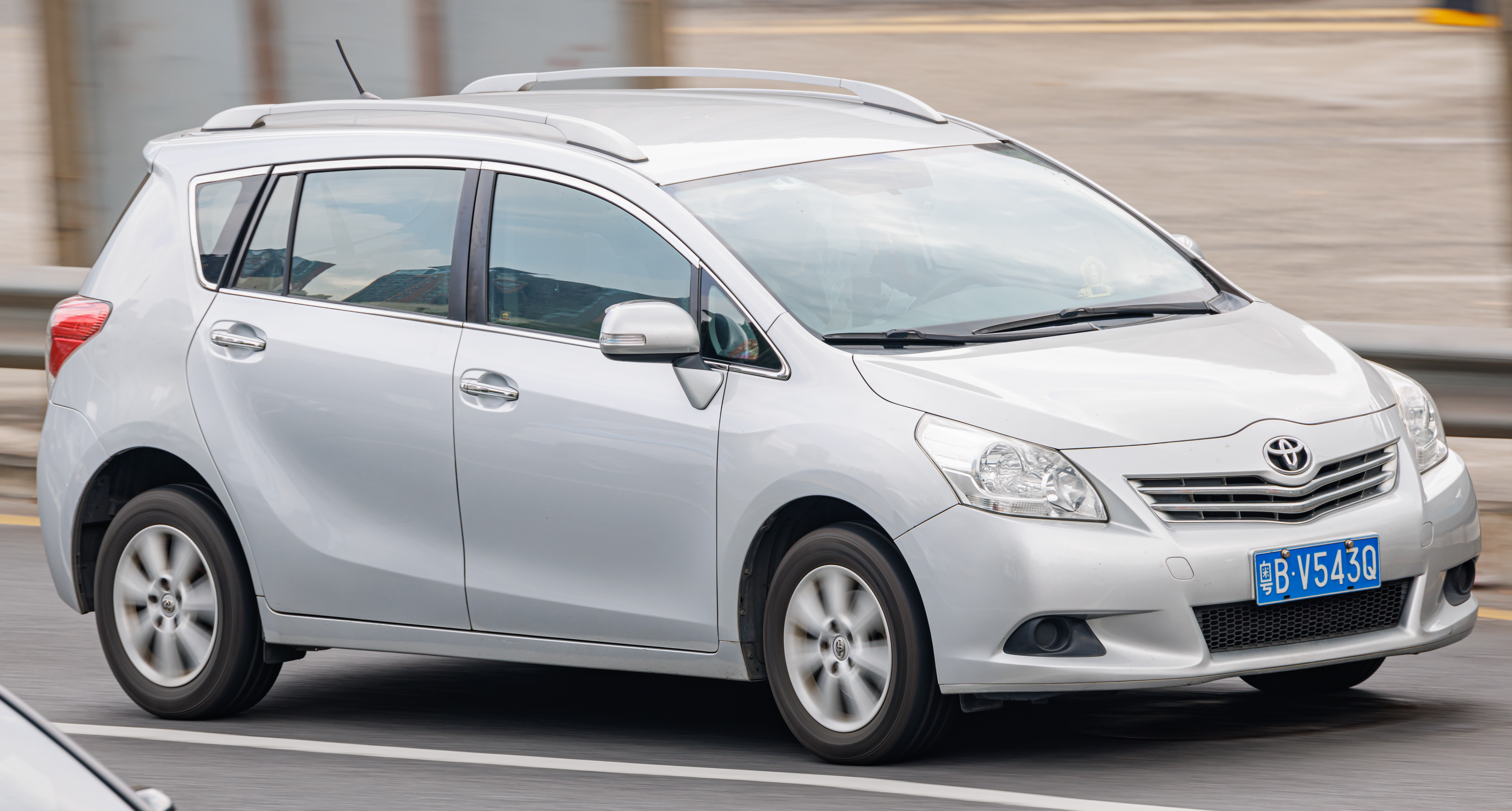
Toyota E'Z (China)

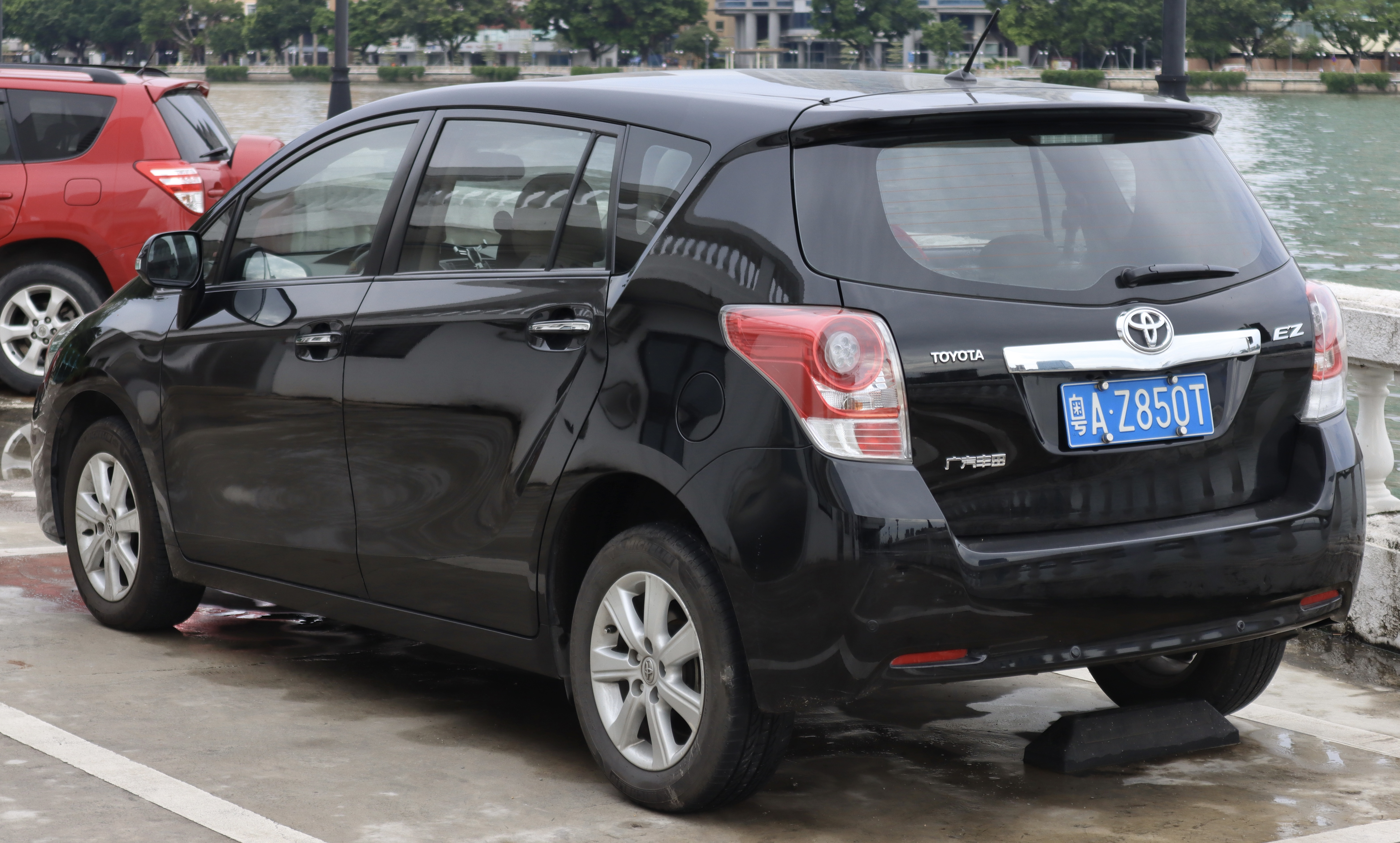
Toyota E'Z (China)

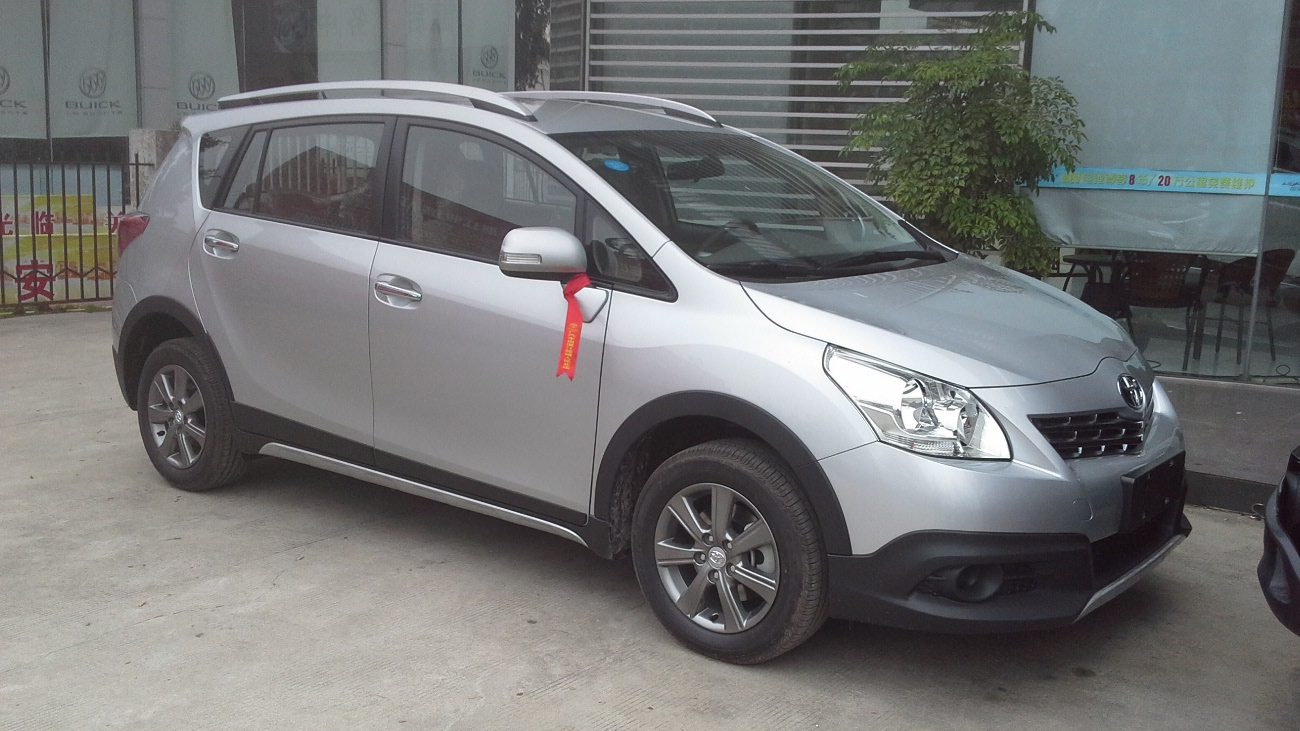
Toyota E'Z Cross (China)

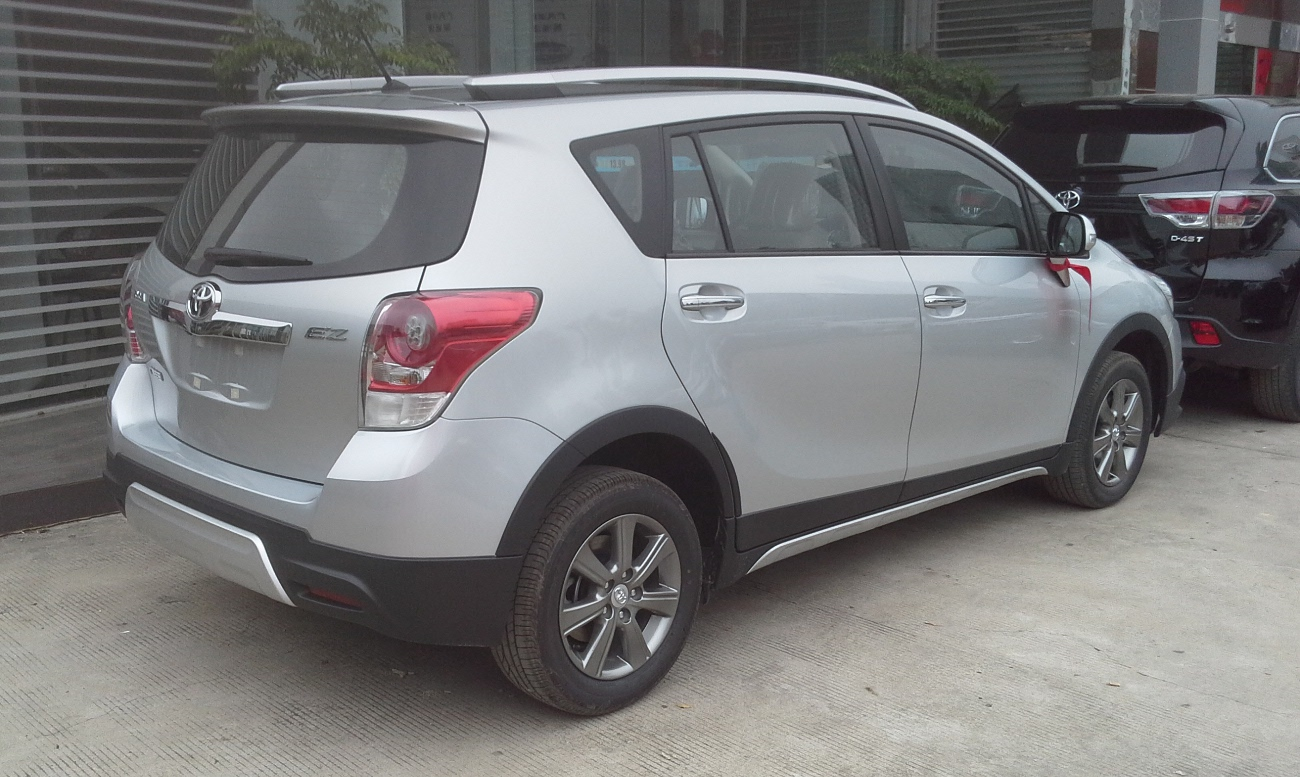
Toyota E'Z Cross (China)

== Sales ==
Year	Europe	China
2009	25,906^{†}	
2010	37,679	
2011	37,544	16,415
2012	32,695	17,286
2013	34,355	17,088
2014	32,875	16,896
2015	31,872	9,414
2016	31,323	6,675
2017	25,249	1,437
2018	6,633	
2019	45	

† including the outgoing Corolla Verso
