= Toyota AD engine =

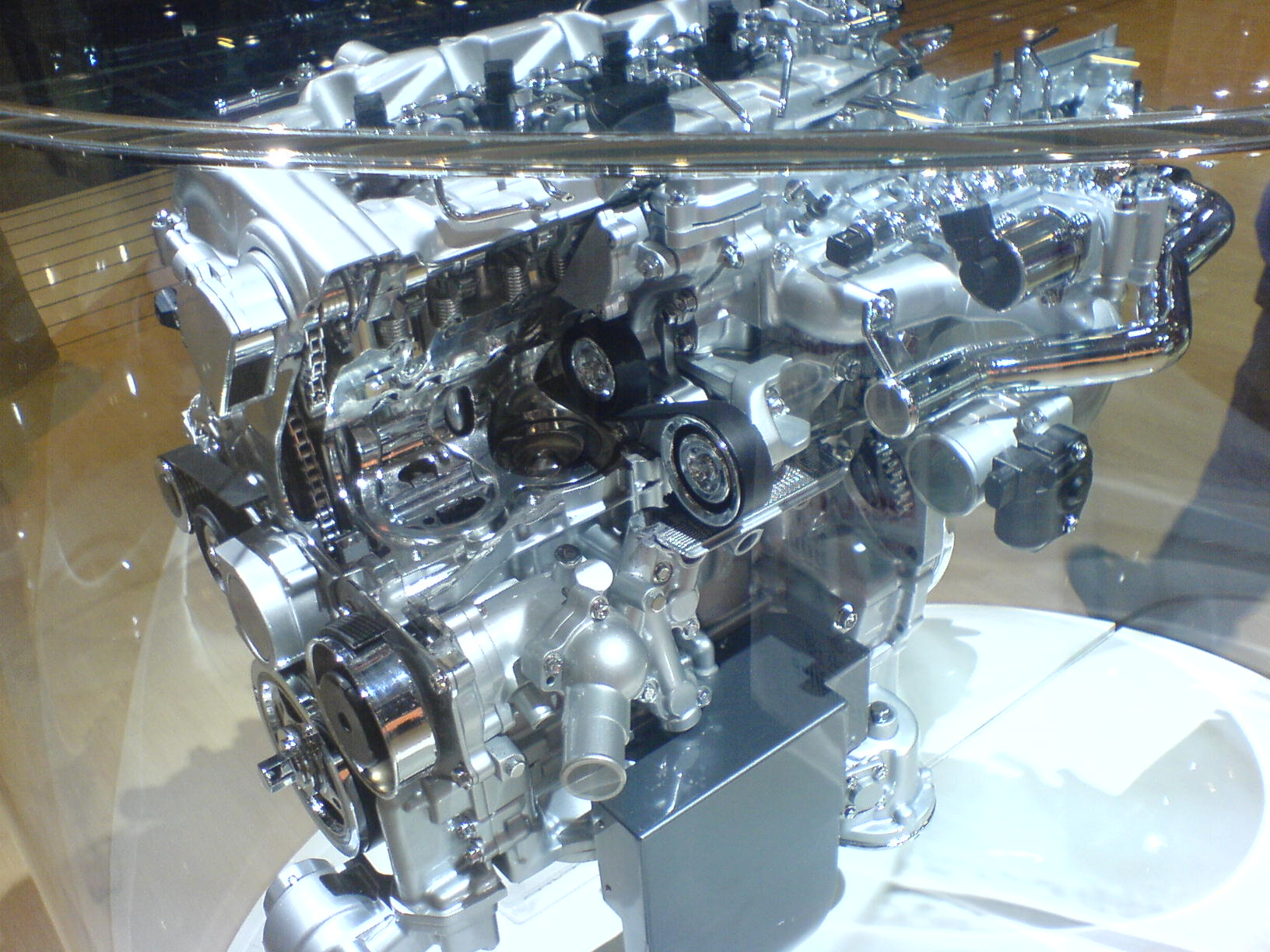

Overview
- Manufacturer: Toyota Motor Corporation
- Production: 2005–2019

Layout
- Configuration: Straight-4
- Cylinder block material: Aluminium
- Cylinder head material: Aluminium
- Valvetrain: DOHC 4 valves x cyl.

Combustion
- Fuel system: Common Rail
- Fuel type: Diesel

Chronology
- Predecessor: Toyota CD engine
- Successor: Toyota WW engine

The Toyota AD engine family is a series of 16 valve DOHC inline-4 turbo diesel diesel engines with electronic common rail direct injection using an aluminium cylinder head and an aluminium cylinder block with cast iron liners derived from the petrol Toyota AZ engine. The AD engine is offered in 2.0 and 2.2 liter versions. These engines are produced mainly for Europe, but few are exported to other areas such as India or New Zealand.

== 1AD-FTV ==
1AD-FTV
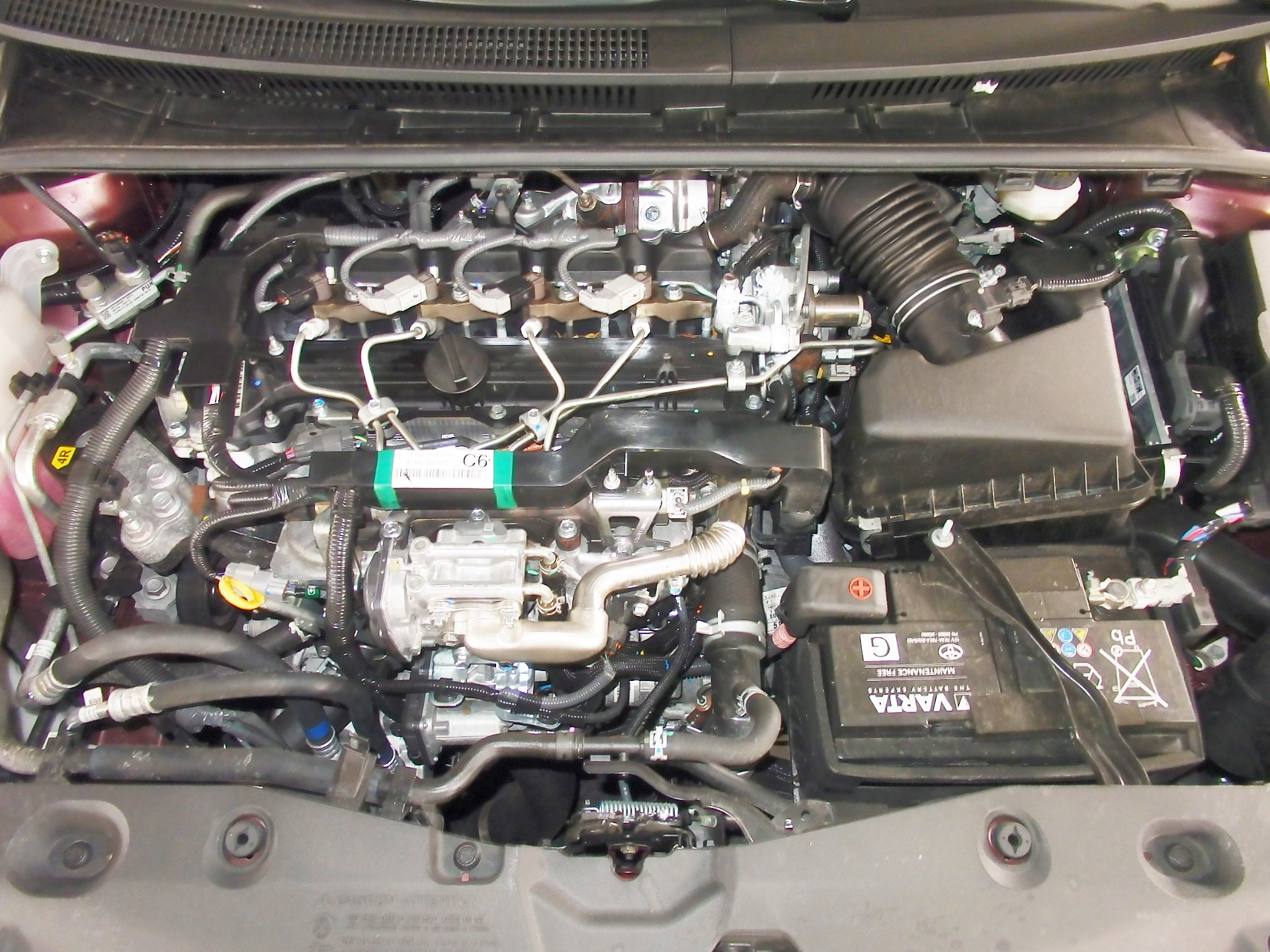

Overview
- Manufacturer: Toyota
- Production: 2005–2019

Layout
- Displacement: 1998 cc
- Cylinder bore: 86mm
- Piston stroke: 86mm
- Compression ratio: 16.8:1-15.8:1

Output
- Power output: 126 bhp (94 kW)
- Torque output: 310 N⋅m (229 lb⋅ft) at 1600 - 2200 rpm

Technical specifications:

- Fuel injection system: common rail 170 MPa (1,700 bar; 25,000 psi) 9 hole solenoid injectors with pilot injection;
- Camshaft drive:Timing Chain
- Exhaust gas treatment: EGR, equipped with cooler and oxidation catalyst;
- Emission standard: Euro IV
- Compression Ratio:16.8:1
- Fuel consumption combined: 49.6–51.4 mpg_{‑imp} (5.70–5.50 L/100 km; 41.3–42.8 mpg_{‑US})
- CO_{2} emission combined: 146 g (5.1 oz)/km

Applications:

Intercooled VGT

Applications:

126 PS (93 kW; 124 hp) at 3600 rpm, 30.6 kg⋅m (300 N⋅m; 221 lb⋅ft) at 2000-3200 rpm (Europe, DIN)

- 2006–2008 Second Generation Toyota Avensis 2.0 D4-D
- 2007–2009 First Generation Toyota Auris 2.0 D4-D
- 2007–2013 Toyota Corolla (E140) 2.0 D4-D
- 2006–2009 Third Generation Toyota Corolla Verso 2.0 D4-D (AUR10)

The AD series engines would get refreshed to meet Euro V emissions with an upgraded fuel injection system, lower compression and addition of a DPF system collectively called by Toyota as Toyota Optimal Drive .

Technical specifications:

- Fuel injection system: common rail 200 MPa (2,000 bar; 29,000 psi) 10-hole piezoelectric injectors with 5-stage pilot injection;
- Camshaft drive: Timing Chain
- Exhaust gas treatment: EGR, equipped with cooler and oxidation catalyst; DPF on some models
- Emission standard: Euro IV or Euro V with DPF
- Compression Ratio: 15.8:1
- Fuel consumption combined: 54.3–61.4 mpg_{‑imp} (5.20–4.60 L/100 km; 45.2–51.1 mpg_{‑US})
- CO_{2} emission combined: 119–138 g (4.2–4.9 oz)/km

Applications:

Intercooled VGT

126 PS (93 kW; 124 hp) at 3600 rpm, 31.6 kg⋅m (310 N⋅m; 229 lb⋅ft) at 1800-2400 rpm (Europe, DIN)

- 2008–2010 Third Generation Toyota Avensis 2.0 D4-D
- 2009-2010 First Generation Toyota Verso 2.0 D4-D
- 2010-2013 First Generation Toyota Auris 2.0 D4-D

Intercooled VGT with DPF

124 PS (91 kW; 122 hp) at 3600 rpm, 31.6 kg⋅m (310 N⋅m; 229 lb⋅ft) at 1600-2400 rpm (Europe, DIN)

- 2013–2016 Second Generation Toyota Auris 2.0 D4-D
- 08.2010–2015 Third Generation Toyota Avensis 2.0 D4-D
- 2013-2016 Toyota Corolla (E170) 2.0 D4-D
- 08.2010-2013 First Generation Toyota Verso 2.0 D4-D
- 2013–2015 Fourth Generation Toyota RAV4 2.0 D4-D

== 2AD-FTV ==
2AD-FTV

Overview
- Manufacturer: Toyota
- Production: 2006-2013

Layout
- Displacement: 2231 cc
- Cylinder bore: 86mm
- Piston stroke: 96mm
- Compression ratio: 16.8:1-15.7:1

Output
- Power output: 100 kW (136 PS), 110 kW (150 PS)
- Torque output: 310 N⋅m (229 lb⋅ft) at 1600 - 2400 rpm (136 bhp variant), 340 N⋅m (251 lb⋅ft) at 2000 - 2800 rpm (150 ps variant)

Technical specifications:

- Fuel injection system: common rail 170 MPa (1,700 bar; 25,000 psi) 9 hole solenoid injectors with pilot injection;
- Camshaft drive:Timing Chain
- Exhaust gas treatment: EGR, equipped with cooler and oxidation catalyst;
- Emission standard: Euro IV
- Compression Ratio:16.8:1
- Fuel consumption combined: 42.8–52.3 mpg_{‑imp} (6.60–5.40 L/100 km; 35.6–43.5 mpg_{‑US})
- CO_{2} emission combined: 156–173 g (5.5–6.1 oz)/km

Applications:

Intercooled VGT

136 PS (100 kW; 134 hp) at 3600 rpm, 31.6 kg⋅m (310 N⋅m; 229 lb⋅ft) at 2000-3200 rpm (Europe, DIN)

- 2006–2009 Third Generation Toyota RAV4 2.2 D4-D
- 2006–2009 Second Generation Toyota Avensis 2.2 D4-D
- 2006–2009 Third Generation Toyota Corolla Verso 2.2 D4-D

The AD series engines would get refreshed to meet Euro V emissions with an upgraded fuel injection system, lower compression and addition of a DPF system collectively called by Toyota as Toyota Optimal Drive .

Technical specifications:

- Fuel injection system: common rail 200 MPa (2,000 bar; 29,000 psi) 10 hole piezoelectric injectors with 5-stage pilot injection;
- Camshaft drive:Timing Chain
- Exhaust gas treatment: EGR, equipped with cooler and oxidation catalyst;
- Emission standard: Euro V
- Compression Ratio:15.7:1
- Fuel consumption combined: 49.6–51.4 mpg_{‑imp} (5.70–5.50 L/100 km; 41.3–42.8 mpg_{‑US})
- CO_{2} emission combined: 146 g (5.1 oz)/km

Applications:

Intercooled VGT

150 PS (110 kW; 148 hp) at 3600 rpm, 34.7 kg⋅m (340 N⋅m; 251 lb⋅ft) at 2000-2800 rpm (Europe, DIN)

- Transversal:
  - 2009–2013 Third Generation Toyota RAV4 2.2 D4-D
  - 2008–2015 Third Generation Toyota Avensis 2.2
  - 2013–2015(EU), 2019(AU/RU) Fourth Generation Toyota RAV4 2.2 D4-D (MT models)
- Longitudinal:
  - 2010–2013 First Generation Lexus IS200d

== 2AD-FHV ==
2AD-FHV

Overview
- Manufacturer: Toyota
- Production: 2005-2015

Layout
- Displacement: 2,231 cc
- Cylinder bore: 86mm
- Piston stroke: 96mm
- Compression ratio: 15.7:1 - 15.8:1

Output
- Power output: 110–130 kW (150–177 PS),
- Torque output: 340 N⋅m (251 lb⋅ft) at 2000 - 2800 rpm (variant 150ps), 400 N⋅m (295 lb⋅ft) at 2000 - 2800 rpm (variant 177ps)

Technical specifications:

- Fuel injection system: common rail 180 MPa (1,800 bar; 26,000 psi),10 hole piezoelectric injectors with 5-stage pilot injection;
- Camshaft drive: Timing Chain
- Exhaust gas treatment: EGR, equipped with cooler and 4-way DPNR Catalyst and Exhaust Port Injection
- Emission standard: Euro IV
- Compression Ratio:15.8:1
- Fuel consumption combined: 34.0–50.4 mpg_{‑imp} (8.31–5.60 L/100 km; 28.3–42.0 mpg_{‑US})
- CO_{2} emission combined: 148–185 g (5.2–6.5 oz)/km

Applications:

Intercooled e-VGT

177 PS (130 kW; 175 hp) at 4000 rpm, 40.8 kg⋅m (400 N⋅m; 295 lb⋅ft) at 2000-2600 rpm (Europe, DIN)

- Transversal:
  - 2005–2009 Second Generation Toyota Avensis 2.2 (D-4D)
  - 2006–2009 Third Generation Toyota RAV4 D-CAT 130 kW (177 PS; 174 hp)
  - 2007–2009 First Generation Toyota Auris 2.2 D-CAT 130 kW (177 PS; 174 hp)
  - 2005–2009 Third Generation Toyota Corolla Verso 2.2 D-CAT
  - 2007-2013 Toyota Corolla (E140) 2.2 D-CAT
- Longitudinal:
  - 2006–2010 Second Generation Lexus IS 220d

The AD series engines would get refreshed to meet Euro V emissions with an upgraded fuel injection system, lower compression and addition of a DPF system collectively called by Toyota as Toyota Optimal Drive .

Technical specifications:

- Fuel injection system: common rail 200 MPa (2,000 bar; 29,000 psi),10 hole piezoelectric injectors with 5-stage pilot injection;
- Camshaft drive: Timing Chain
- Exhaust gas treatment: EGR, equipped with cooler and 4-way DPNR Catalyst and Exhaust Port Injection
- Emission standard: Euro V
- Compression Ratio:15.7:1
- Fuel consumption combined: 41.5–48.7 mpg_{‑imp} (6.81–5.80 L/100 km; 34.6–40.6 mpg_{‑US})
- CO_{2} emission combined: 147–178 g (5.2–6.3 oz)/km

Applications:

Intercooled e-VGT

179 PS (132 kW; 177 hp) at 4000 rpm, 40.8 kg⋅m (400 N⋅m; 295 lb⋅ft) at 2000-2800 rpm (Europe, DIN)

- 2008–2011 Third Generation Toyota Avensis 2.2
- 2009–2011 First Generation Toyota Auris 2.2 D-CAT

150 PS (110 kW; 148 hp) at 3600 rpm, 34.7 kg⋅m (340 N⋅m; 251 lb⋅ft) at 2000-2800 rpm (Europe, DIN)

- 2008–2015 Third Generation Toyota Avensis 2.2
- 2009–2013 Third Generation Toyota RAV4 D-CAT
- 2009-2012 First Generation Toyota Verso 2.0 D4-D
- 2013–2015 (EU), 2019 (AU/RU) Fourth Generation Toyota RAV4 2.2 D-CAT (AT models)
