= Toyota CD engine =

Overview
- Manufacturer: Toyota

Layout
- Configuration: Straight-4
- Displacement: 2.0 L (1,995 cc)
- Cylinder bore: 82.2 mm (3.24 in)
- Piston stroke: 94 mm (3.7 in)
- Valvetrain: DOHC, 4 valves per cylinder
- Compression ratio: 17.8:1 - 18.6:1

Combustion
- Turbocharger: Variable-geometry with intercooler
- Fuel system: Common rail direct injection
- Fuel type: Diesel
- Cooling system: Water-cooled

Output
- Power output: 89–116 hp (66–87 kW)
- Specific power: 44.6 hp (33.3 kW)/L - 58.1 hp (43.3 kW)/L
- Torque output: 215–280 N⋅m (159–207 lb⋅ft)

The Toyota CD engine is a 2.0 L (1,995 cc) diesel engine used in the Toyota Corolla, RAV4, Avensis and other vehicles. It is a DOHC engine with a bore and stroke of 82.2 mm × 94 mm (3.24 in × 3.70 in) with 116 hp (87 kW). The higher-output CD Series engines have now largely been replaced by the AD engine while low output applications were replaced by the ND engine.

== 1CD-FTV ==
The 1CD-FTV (2.0 D-4D) is a compact inline-four turbocharged diesel engine initially in the first generation Avensis on November 22, 1999

=== 1st generation ===
Technical specifications:

- Fuel injection system: common rail 135 MPa (1,350 bar; 19,600 psi),6 hole solenoid injectors with pilot injection
- Camshaft drive: timing belt
- Exhaust gas treatment: EGR equipped with catalyst; (EGR cooler on RAV4)
- Emission standard: Euro III
- Compression Ratio: 18.6:1
- Fuel consumption combined: 39.2–47.9 mpg_{‑imp} (7.21–5.90 L/100 km; 32.6–39.9 mpg_{‑US})
- CO_{2} emission combined: 158–191 g (5.6–6.7 oz)/km

==== Applications ====
===== Non-Intercooled Non VGT =====
90 PS (66 kW; 89 hp) at 4000 rpm, 21.9 kg⋅m (215 N⋅m; 158 lb⋅ft) at 2400 rpm (Europe, Net DIN)

- August 2000 – September 2001 Eighth generation Toyota Corolla (CDE110)
- October 2000 – 2004 Ninth generation Toyota Corolla (CDE120)
- First Generation Corolla Verso

===== Intercooled Non VGT =====
111 PS (82 kW; 109 hp) at 4000 rpm, 25.5 kg⋅m (250 N⋅m; 184 lb⋅ft) at 2000-2400 rpm (Europe, Net DIN)

- 1999-2003 First generation Toyota Avensis
- Ninth generation Toyota Corolla T-Spirit 5dr hatchback

===== Intercooled VGT =====
116 PS (85 kW; 114 hp) at 4000 rpm, 25.5 kg⋅m (250 N⋅m; 184 lb⋅ft) at 1800-3000 rpm (Europe, Net DIN)

- August 2001-?First generation Toyota Avensis Verso
- Second Generation Previa
- Second Generation RAV4

=== 2nd Generation ===
The 1CD-FTV was revised with a lower compression ratio and a second generation common rail system in preparation of then upcoming Euro IV emission standards. It was first introduced in the second generation Avensis in February 2003 where PM and NOX reducing D-CAT was also first implemented.

Technical specifications:

- Fuel injection system: common rail 160 MPa (1,600 bar; 23,000 psi)/175–180 MPa (1,750–1,800 bar; 25,400–26,100 psi) on D-CAT Variants,6 hole solenoid injectors with pilot injection
- Camshaft drive: timing belt
- Exhaust gas treatment: EGR, equipped with cooler and catalyst; 4-way DPNR Catalyst and Exhaust Port Injection on D-CAT Variants
- Emission standard: Euro IV (Euro III: Corolla Verso)
- Compression Ratio: 17.8:1
- Fuel consumption combined: 45.6–48.7 mpg_{‑imp} (6.19–5.80 L/100 km; 38.0–40.6 mpg_{‑US})
- CO_{2} emission combined: 149–165 g (5.3–5.8 oz)/km

==== Applications ====
===== Intercooled VGT with D-CAT =====
118 PS (87 kW; 116 hp) at 4000 rpm, 28.6 kg⋅m (280 N⋅m; 207 lb⋅ft) at 2000-2200 rpm (Europe)

- February 2003 – June 2006 Second generation Toyota Avensis

===== Intercooled VGT =====
116 PS (85 kW; 114 hp) at 3600 rpm, 28.6 kg⋅m (280 N⋅m; 207 lb⋅ft) at 2000-2200 rpm (Europe)

- Ninth generation Toyota Corolla
- Second Generation Corolla Verso
