= Toyota Avensis =

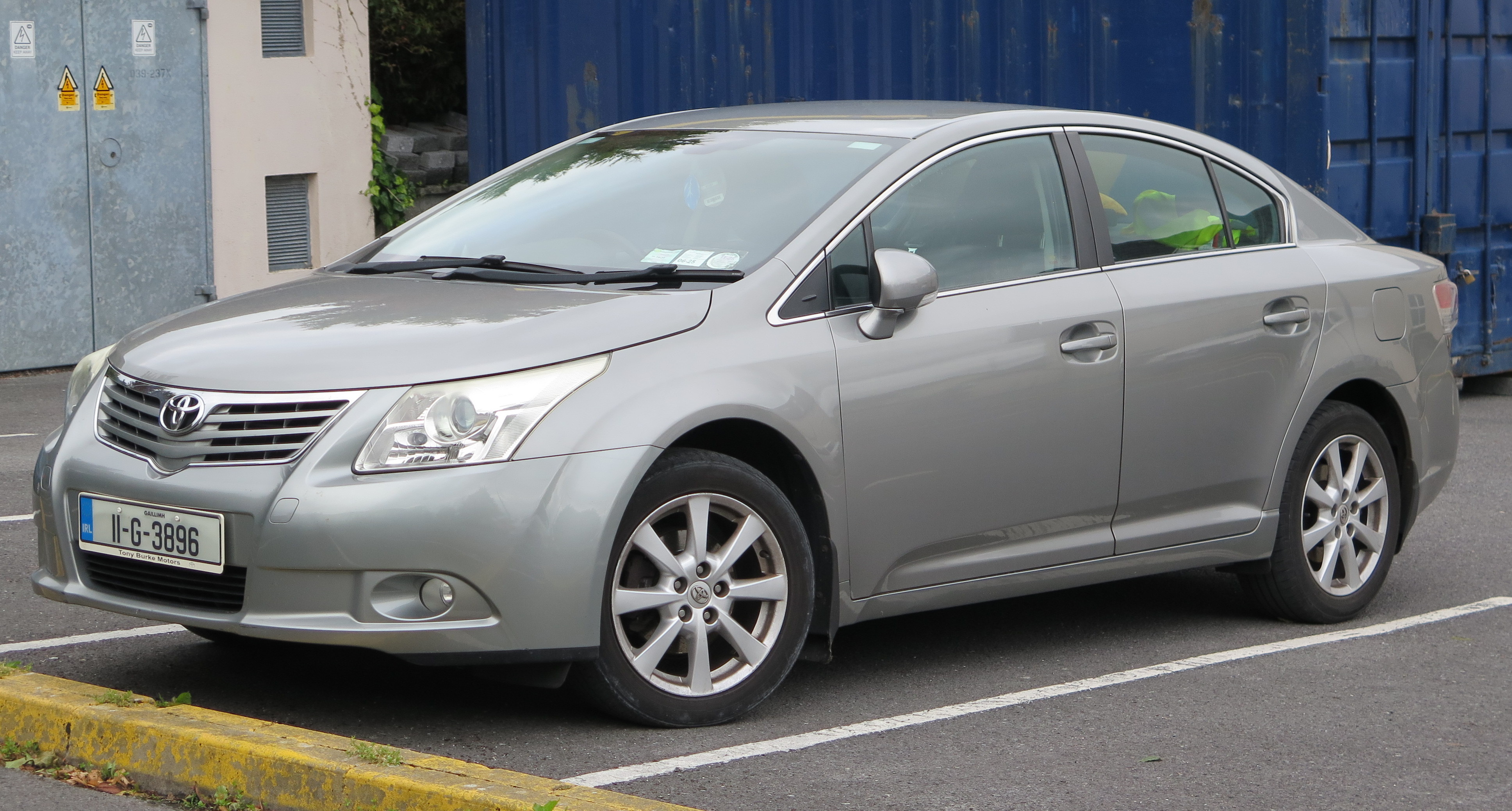
- 2011 Toyota Avensis saloon (T270, Ireland)

Overview
- Manufacturer: Toyota
- Production: October 1997 – August 2018
- Assembly: United Kingdom: Burnaston, Derbyshire (Toyota Manufacturing UK)

Body and chassis
- Class: Mid-size/large family car (D)
- Layout: Front-engine, front-wheel-drive; Front-engine, four-wheel-drive

Chronology
- Predecessor: Toyota Corona/Carina E (Europe); Toyota Vista (V50) (Japan, for T250 model); Toyota Camry (XV30) (Europe, for T250 model)
- Successor: Toyota Camry (XV70)

The Toyota Avensis (Japanese: トヨタ・アベンシス, Hepburn: Toyota Abenshisu) is a mid-size/large family car built in Derbyshire, United Kingdom by the Japanese automaker Toyota from October 1997 to August 2018. It was the direct successor to the European Carina E and was available as a four-door saloon, five-door liftback and estate.

The Avensis was introduced in 1997, to create a more modern name when compared with the Carina E. The "Avensis" name is derived from the French term avancer, meaning "to advance" or "move forward". The Avensis was not sold in North America, and it is related to the Scion tC coupé. It also shared a platform with the Allion and Premio and was available at Japanese dealership network Toyota Netz Store.

An MPV called the Avensis Verso (Ipsum in Japan and previously the Picnic in other markets) was built in Japan on a separate platform.

== First generation (T220; 1997) ==
First generation
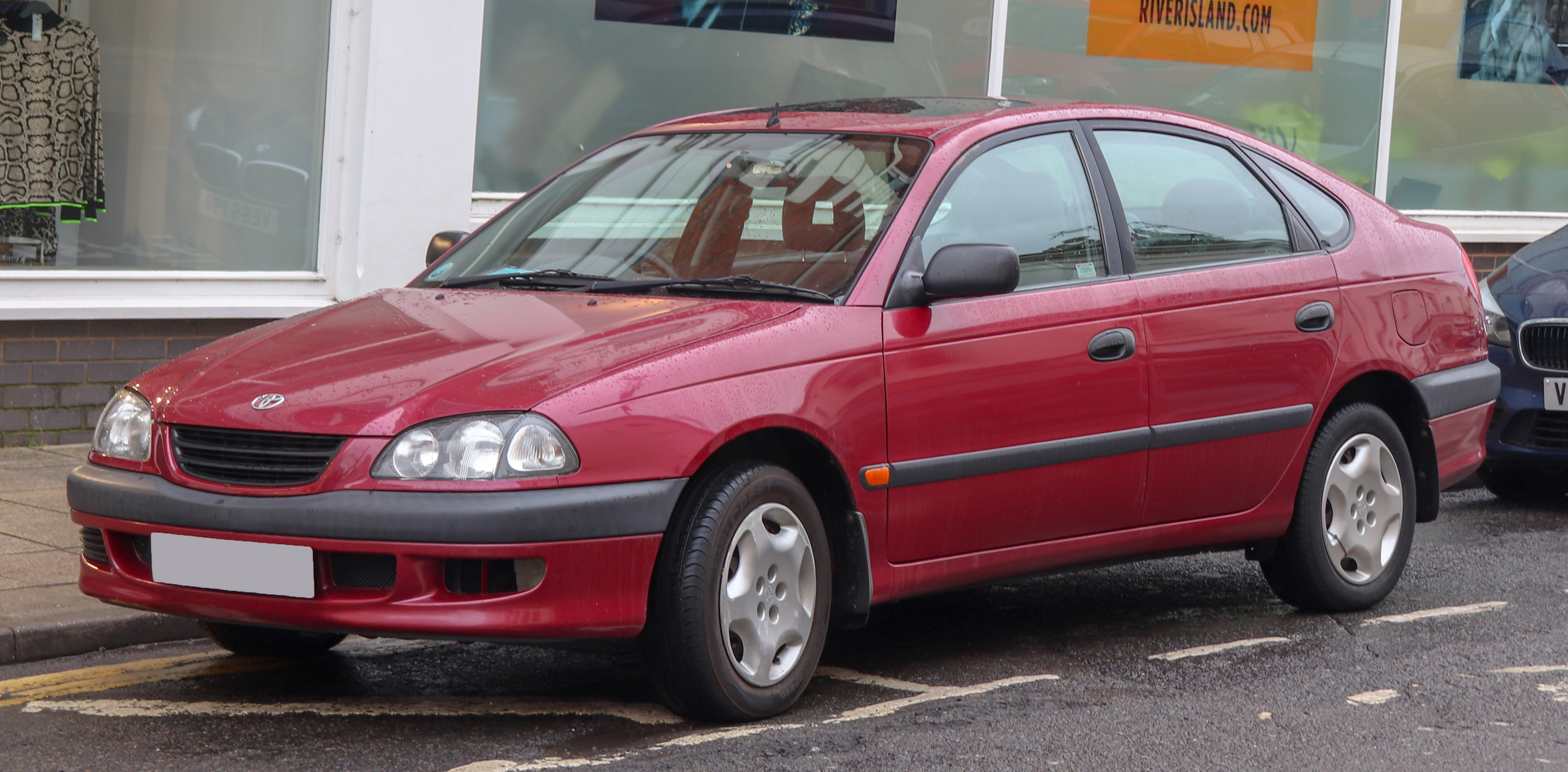
- Toyota Avensis GS (UK)

Overview
- Model code: T220
- Also called: Toyota Corona (Latin America, Greece); Toyota Corona Avensis (Peru, Chile); Toyota Caldina (Japan)
- Production: 1997–2003

Body and chassis
- Body style: 4-door saloon; 5-door liftback; 5-door estate
- Related: Toyota Avensis Picnic/Ipsum/Picnic/SportsVan (XM10); Toyota Carina (T210); Toyota Celica (T200); Toyota Corona (T210)

Powertrain
- Engine: Petrol: 1.6 L 4A-FE I4; 1.6 L 3ZZ-FE VVT-i I4; 1.8 L 7A-FE I4; 1.8 L 1ZZ-FE VVT-i I4; 2.0 L 3S-FE I4; 2.0 L 1AZ-FSE VVT-i D-4 I4; Diesel: 2.0 L 2C-TE TD I4; 2.0 L 1CD-FTV D-4D direct injection turbo diesel I4
- Transmission: 5-speed manual; 4-speed A246E automatic

Dimensions
- Wheelbase: 2,630 mm (103.5 in)
- Length: Estate: 4,600 mm (181.1 in); Others: 4,520 mm (178.0 in)
- Width: 1,710 mm (67.3 in)
- Height: Estate: 1,500 mm (59.1 in); Others: 1,425 mm (56.1 in)

Toyota introduced the Avensis nameplate on its new model, which was launched at the end of 1997. The car was largely based on its predecessor Carina E, with the platform and engines carried over. The car was built at the Burnaston factory in Derby. At the same time, production of the five-door Toyota Corolla also started at the British plant.

The first-generation Avensis had the option of four engines (1.6–, 1.8– and 2.0–litre petrol and a 2.0–litre turbo-diesel) and three body styles (saloon, hatchback and estate). The station wagon was essentially the Japanese-market second generation Toyota Caldina. All of the range gave solid build quality and reliability, a spacious interior, generous equipment, smooth ride quality and good refinement, but driving dynamics as conservative.

The model received a facelift in August 2000. The engines were fitted with variable valve timing, satellite navigation was included as a standard feature along the range and the sporty Avensis 2.0 L SR (with body kit and tuned suspension) was added but overall sales remained low.

The Avensis was also sold in South America. In Argentina and Brazil, it was sold as the Toyota Corona (as seen on brochures), but in Chile and Peru, it was sold as the Corona Avensis. In Greece, the Toyota Corona model name had long been synonymous with "taxi", so Avensis models sold for taxi use received "Toyota Corona" badging until the 2000 facelift. Models for private use and post-facelift taxis were named Avensis, just like in the rest of Europe.

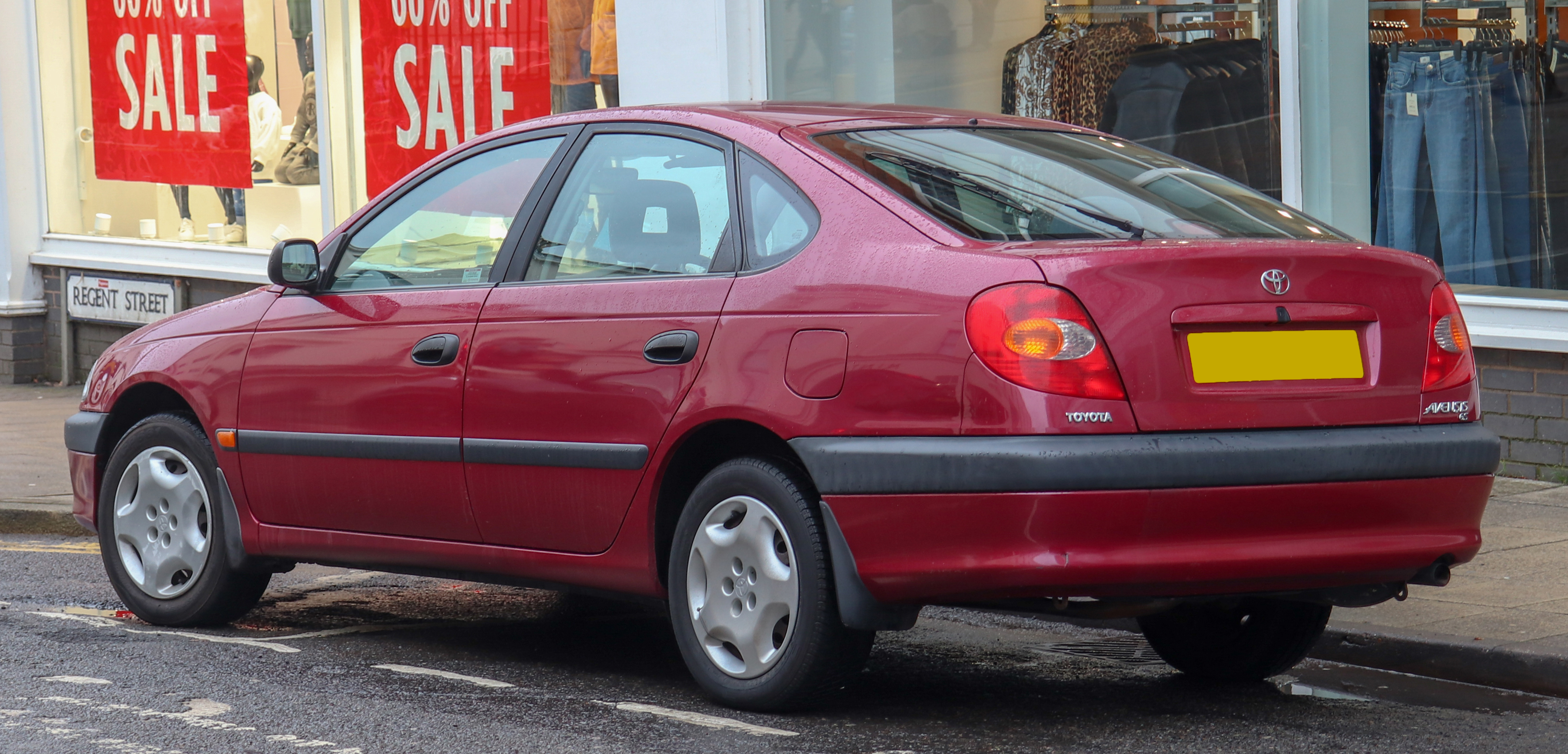
Liftback (pre-facelift)

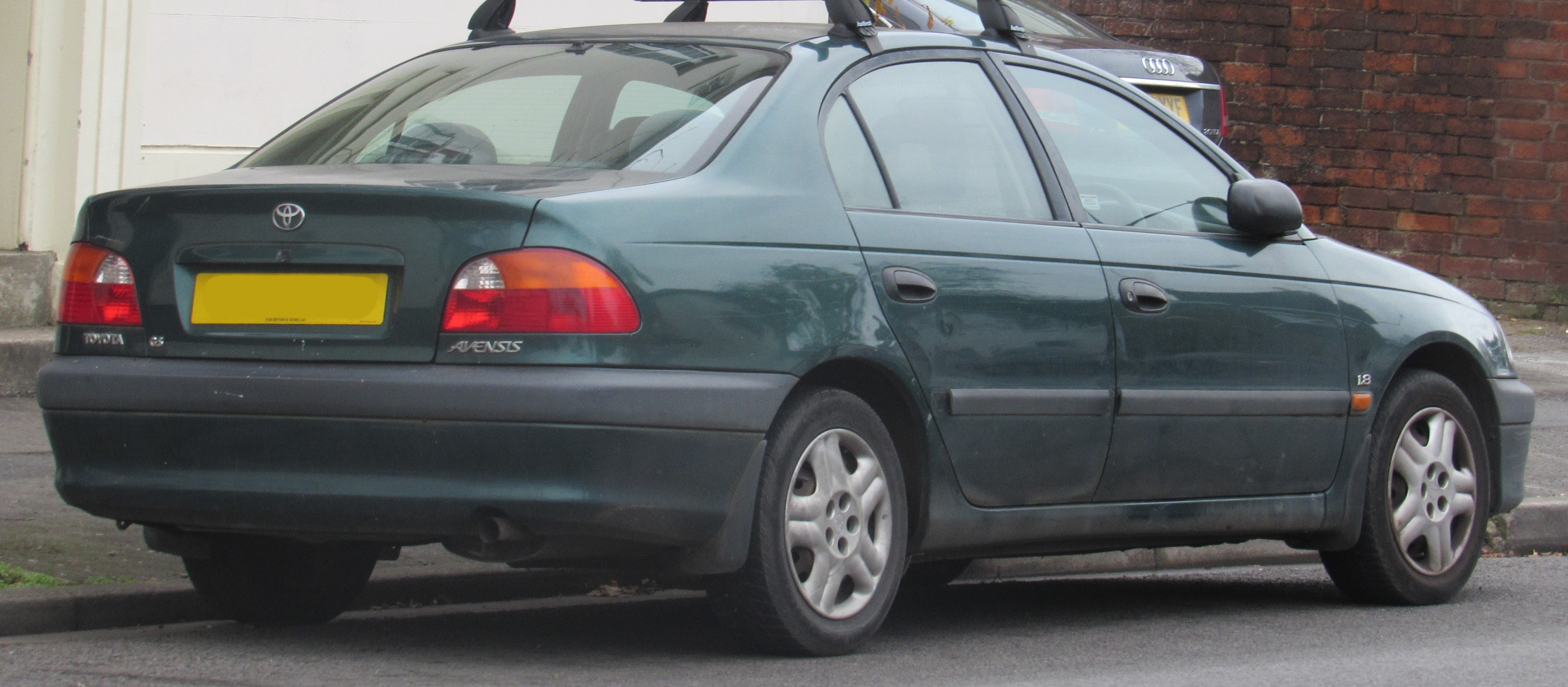
Saloon (pre-facelift)

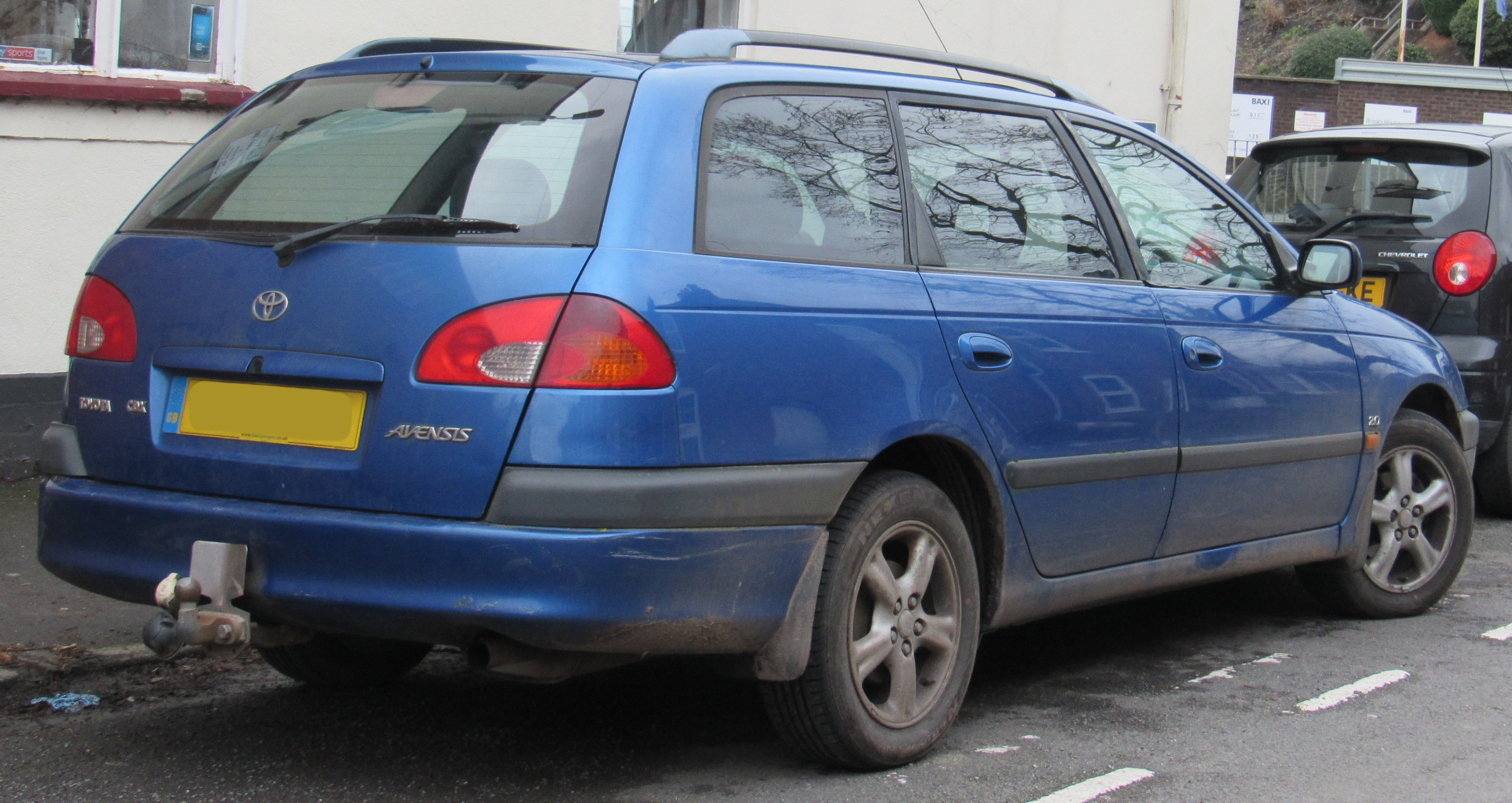
Estate (pre-facelift)

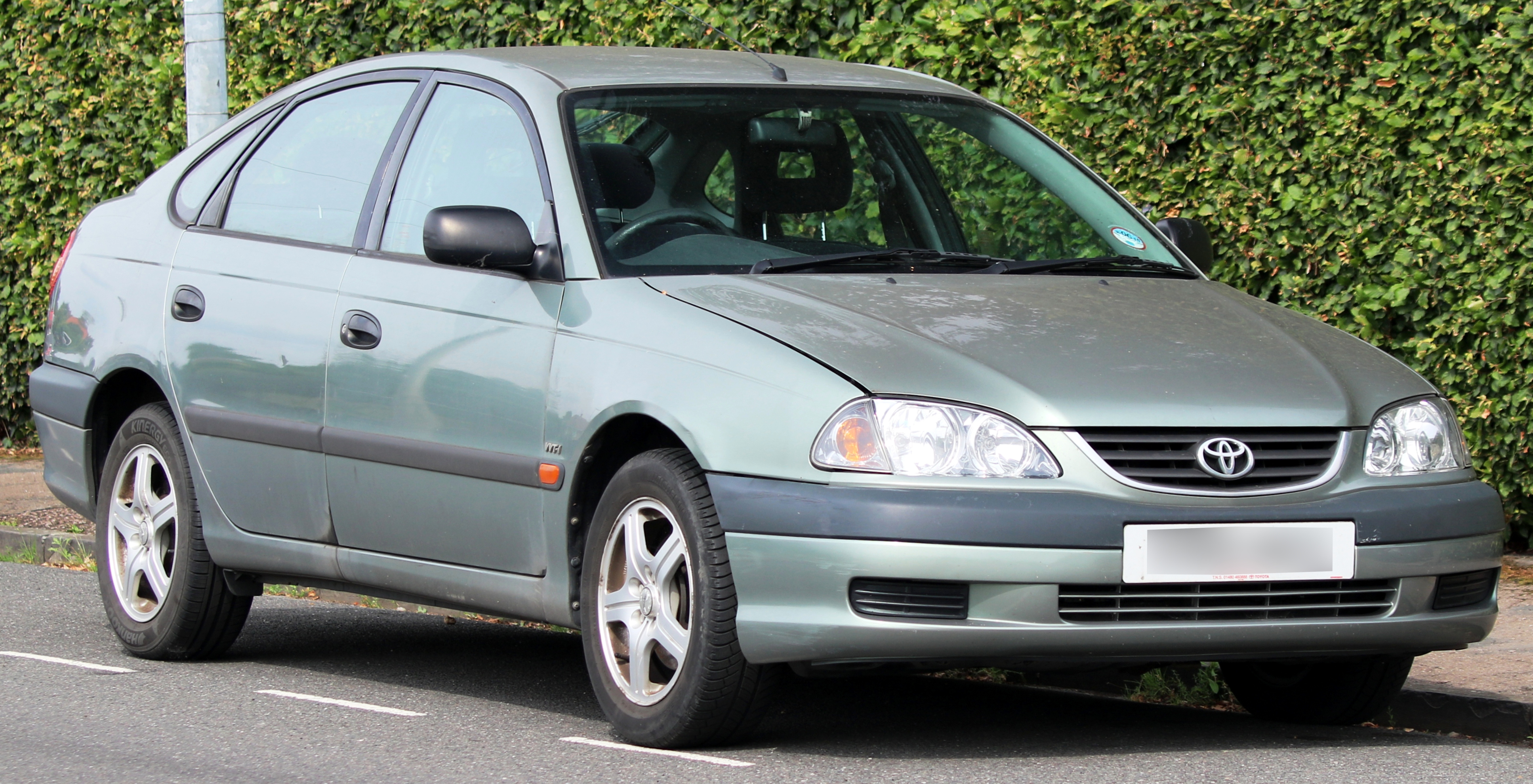
Liftback (facelift)

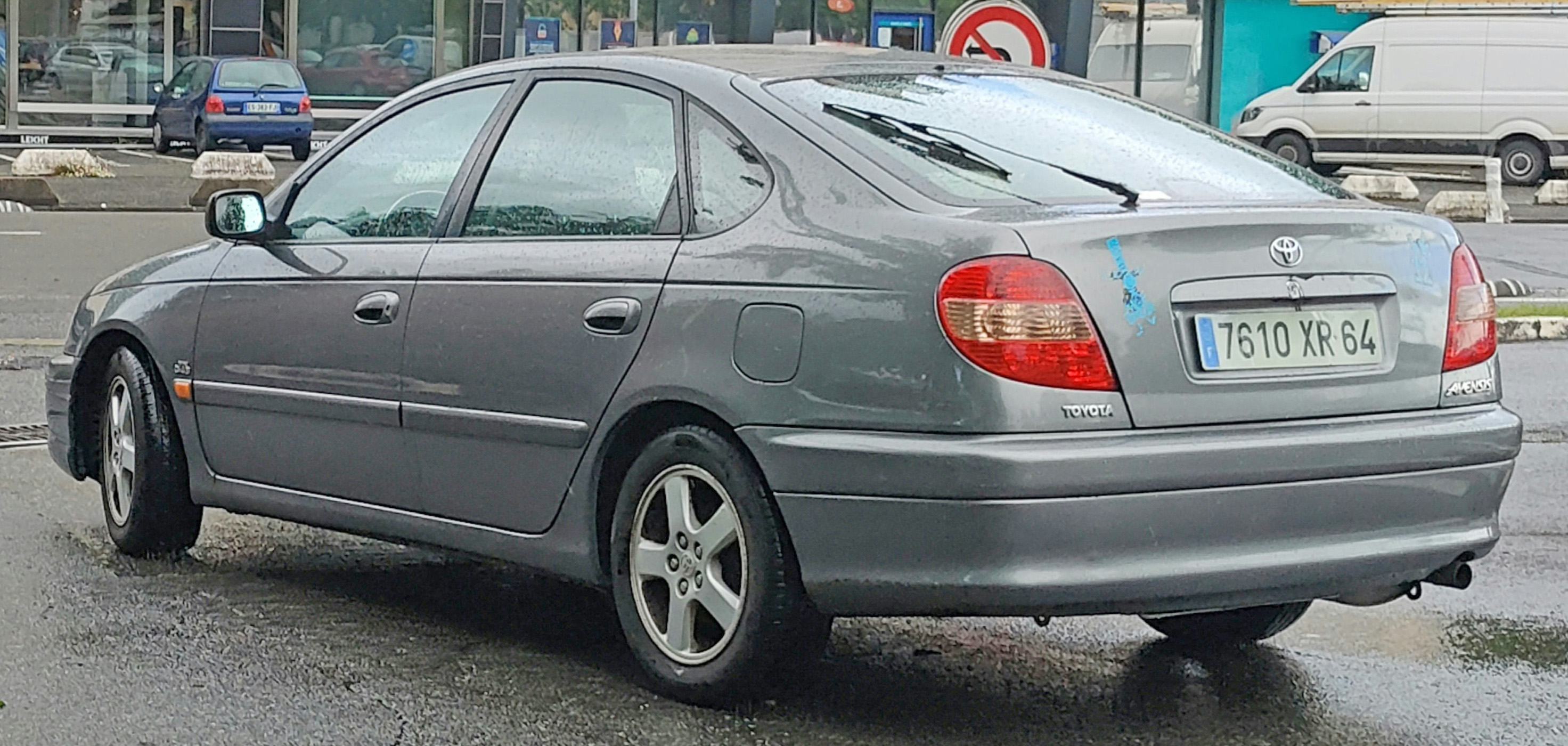
Liftback (facelift)

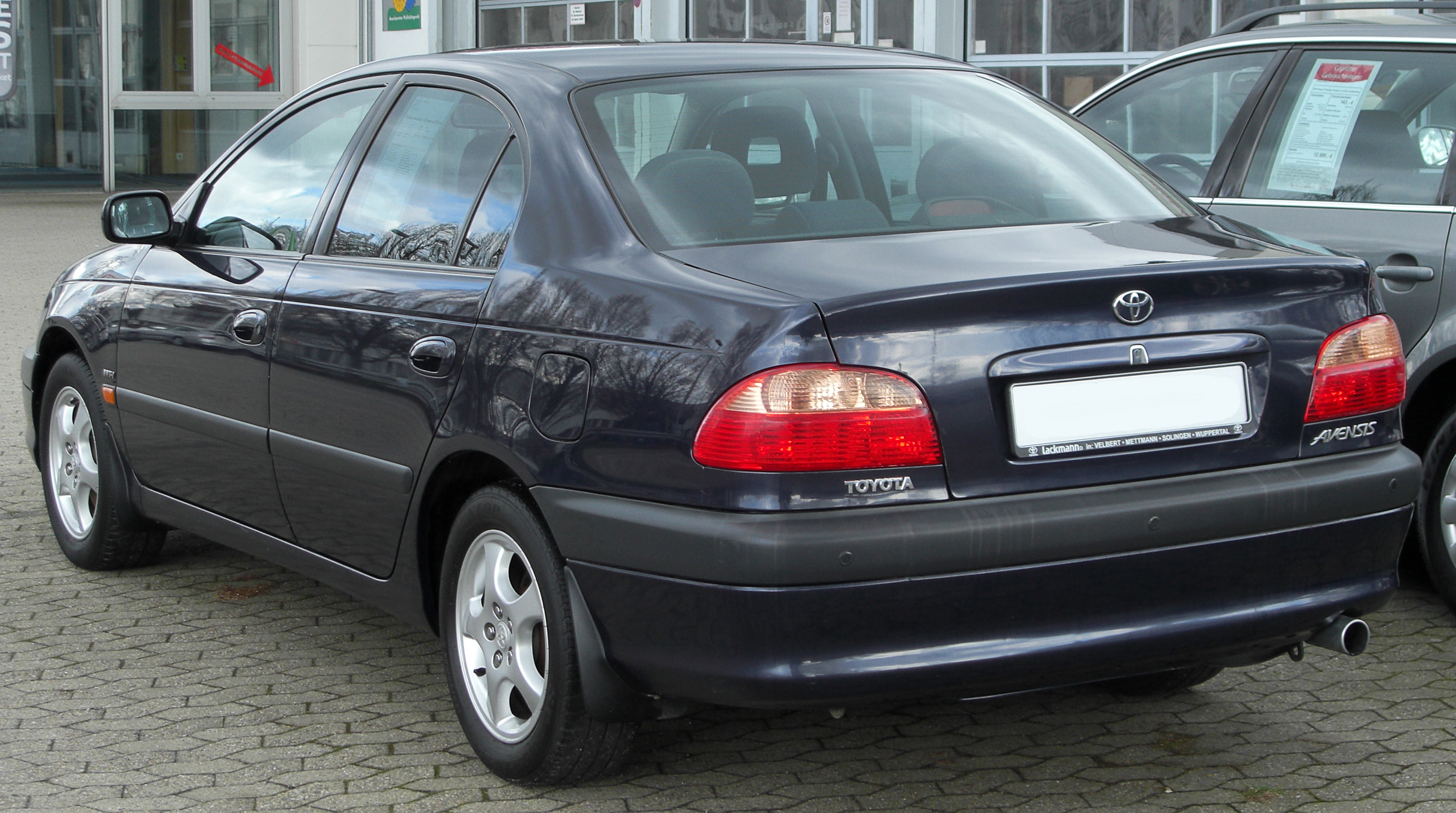
Saloon (facelift)

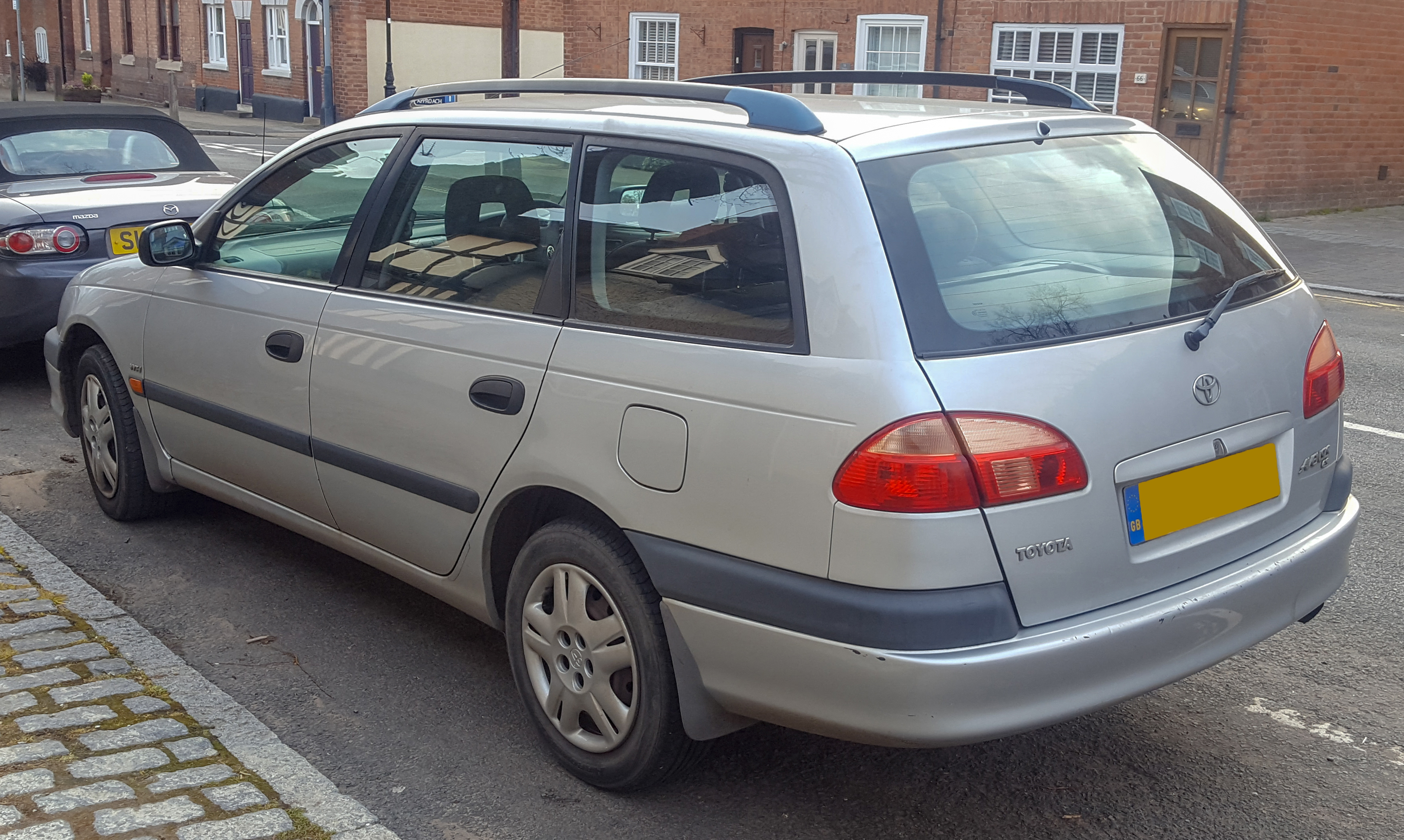
Estate (facelift)

=== Engines ===
==== Petrol ====
- 1.6-litre 4A-FE 81 kW (110 hp)
- 1.6-litre VVT-i 3ZZ-FE 81 kW (110 hp)
- 1.8-litre 7A-FE 81 kW (110 hp)
- 1.8-litre VVT-i 1ZZ-FE 95 kW (129 hp)
- 2.0-litre 3S-FE 94 kW (128 hp)
- 2.0-litre D4 VVT-i 1AZ-FSE 110 kW (150 hp)

==== Diesel ====
- 2.0-litre TD 2C-TE 66 kW (90 hp)
- 2.0-litre D-4D 1CD-FTV 81 kW (110 hp)

== Second generation (T250; 2003) ==
Second generation
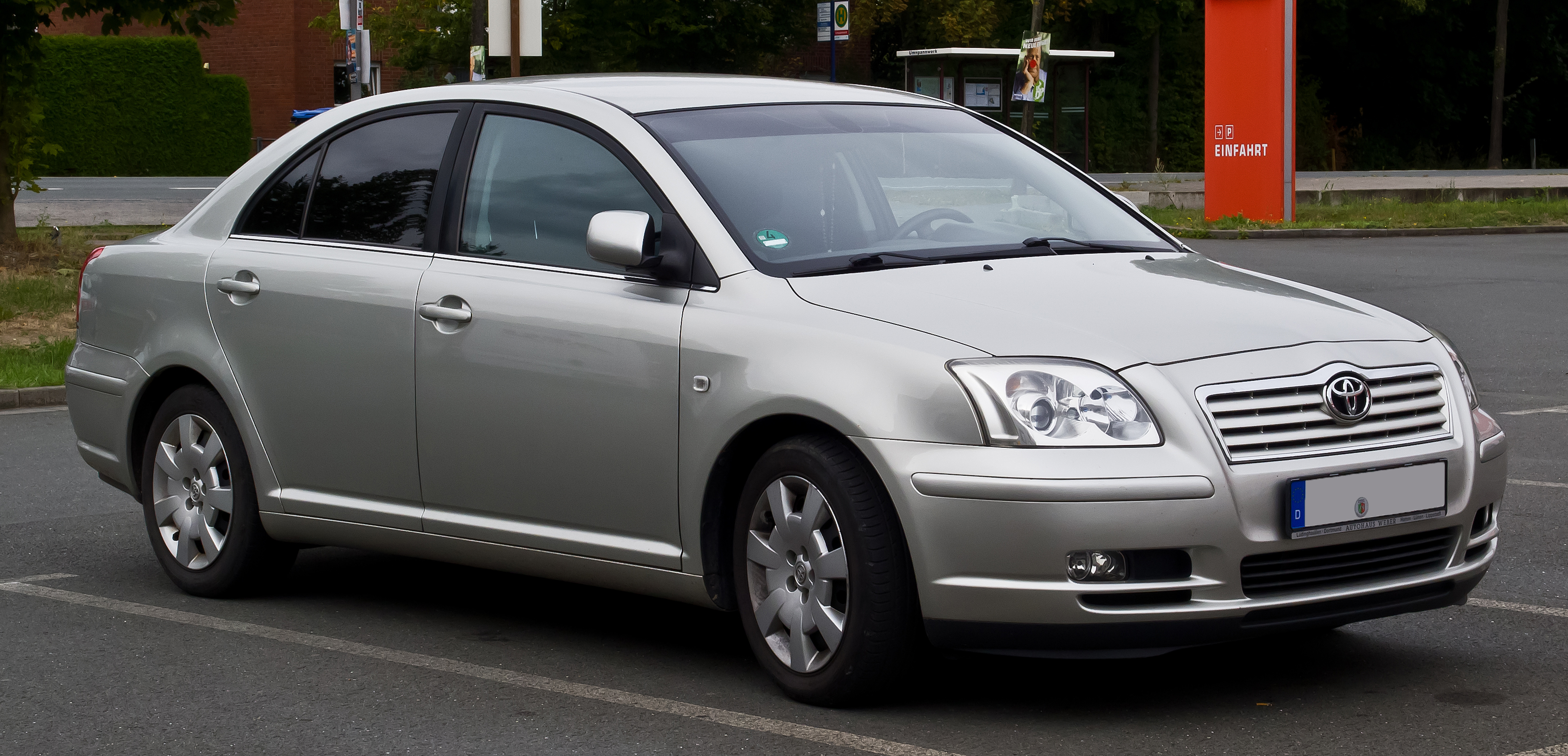
- Toyota Avensis (Germany)

Overview
- Model code: T250
- Production: January 2003 – 2009

Body and chassis
- Body style: 4-door saloon; 5-door liftback; 5-door estate
- Platform: Toyota MC platform
- Related: Toyota Allion (T240); Toyota Avensis Verso/Ipsum/Picnic/SportsVan (XM20); Toyota Caldina (T240); Toyota Corolla Verso (AR10); Toyota Premio (T240); Scion tC (AT10)

Powertrain
- Engine: Petrol: 1.6 L 3ZZ-FE VVT-i I4; 1.8 L 1ZZ-FE VVT-i I4; 2.0 L 1AZ-FSE VVT-i D4 I4; 2.4 L 2AZ-FSE VVT-i D4 I4; Diesel: 2.0 L 1CD-FTV D-4D Direct injection turbo I4; 2.0 L 1AD-FTV D-4D direct turbo I4; 2.2 L 2AD-FTV D-4D direct turbo I4; 2.2 L 2AD-FHV D-CAT direct turbo I4
- Transmission: 5-speed manual; 6-speed manual; 4-speed U341E automatic; 5-speed Automatic

Dimensions
- Wheelbase: 2,700 mm (106.3 in)
- Length: Estate: 4,715 mm (185.6 in); Others: 4,645 mm (182.9 in)
- Width: 1,760 mm (69.3 in)
- Height: Estate: 1,525 mm (60.0 in); Others: 1,480 mm (58.3 in)

Chronology
- Predecessor: Toyota Vista (V50) (Japan); Toyota Camry (XV30) (Europe)

The second generation Avensis was launched in February 2003, in an all new format; this time it offered more in the way of driver involvement and visual appeal. It was launched in Japan in saloon and estate form in October 2003, replacing the V50 series Vista and Vista Ardeo. Like the Echo/Yaris and Corolla, it was penned by the company's design studio in France. Production officially began on 6 January 2003. Following the withdrawal of the Camry in 2004 (2005 in Switzerland), the Avensis became the largest Toyota saloon sold in Western Europe.

Trim levels in the United Kingdom were T2, T3-S, T3-X, T4, T Spirit, T180 and TR. There is also a special edition, based on the T2 called the Colour Collection. In Ireland, there were five trim levels – Terra, Aura, Strata, Luna and Sol. In Japan, the Avensis is sold as 2.0 Xi, 2.0 Li (later replaced by 2.4 Li) and 2.4 Qi. Only the base model 2.0 Xi is offered with four-wheel drive.

This is first and only generation of Avensis sold in Egypt and Morocco, not in Persian Gulf countries. In South Africa, the Avensis arrived in late 2006 to replace the Australian-sourced Camry, and was the last large saloon sold by Toyota South Africa.

In the 2004 European Car of the Year contest, the Avensis came in fourth place behind the Fiat Panda (winner), Mazda3 (second) and the Volkswagen Golf (third). However, it won the 2004 Semperit Irish Car of the Year. What Car? also awarded the Avensis as the "Best Family Car" for 2004 and 2005.

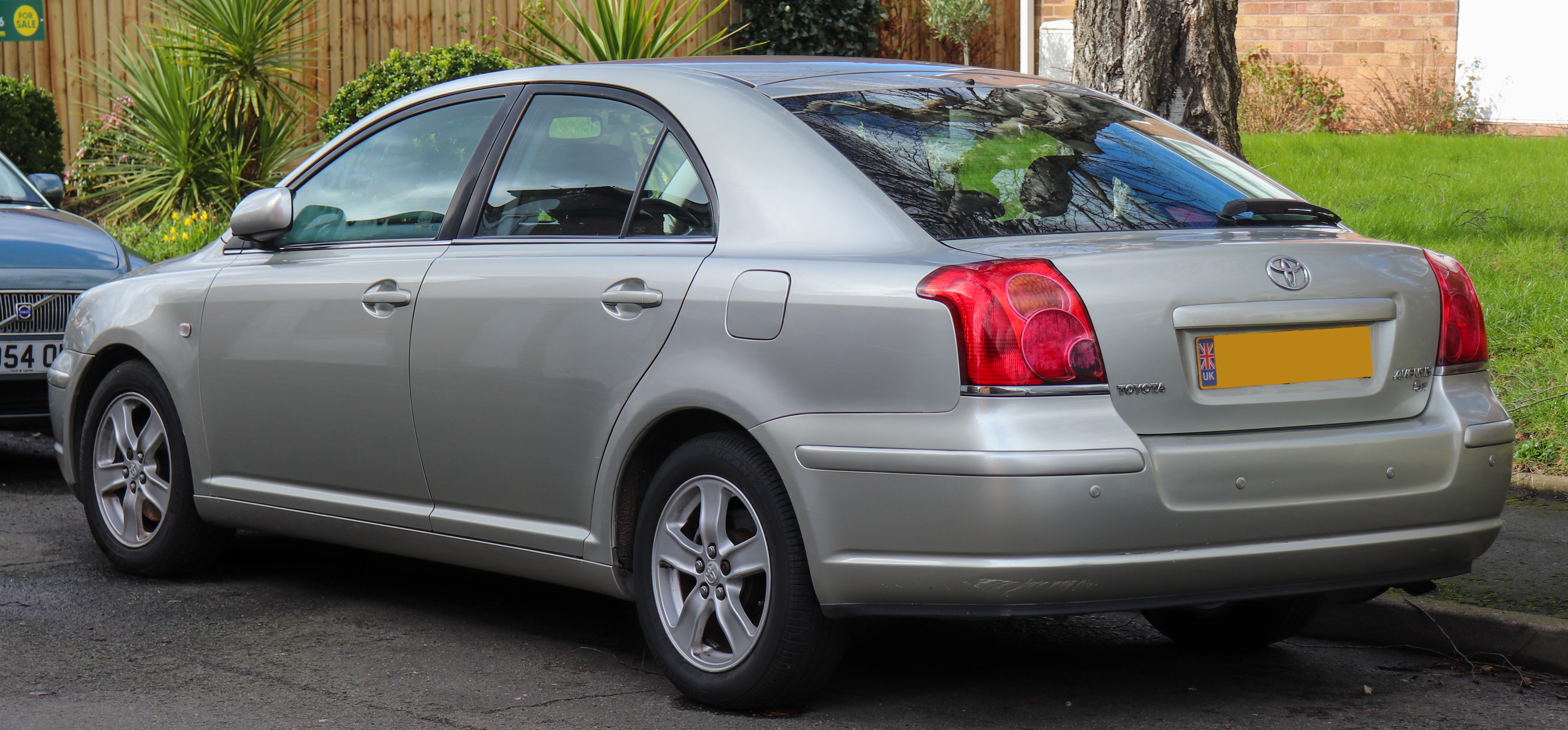
Liftback (pre-facelift)

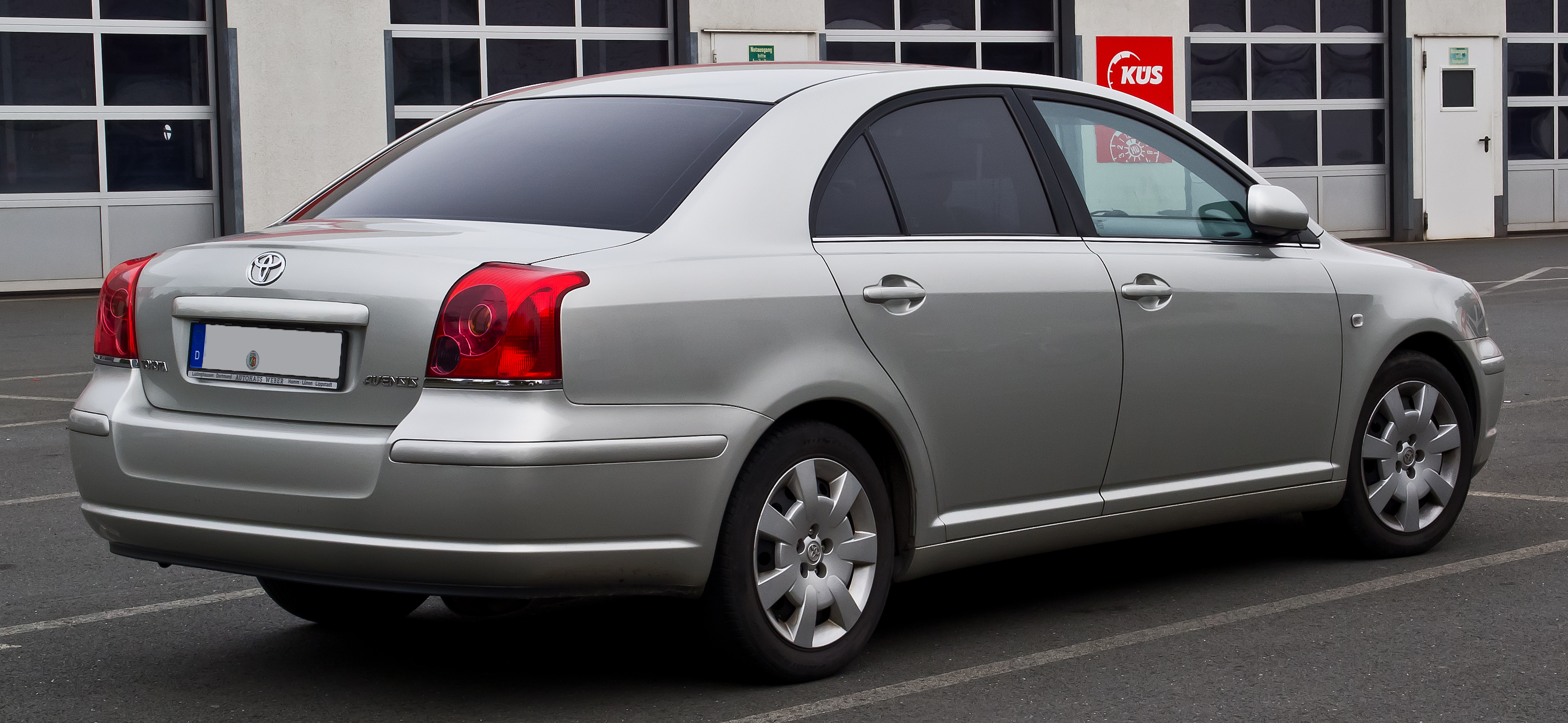
Saloon (pre-facelift)

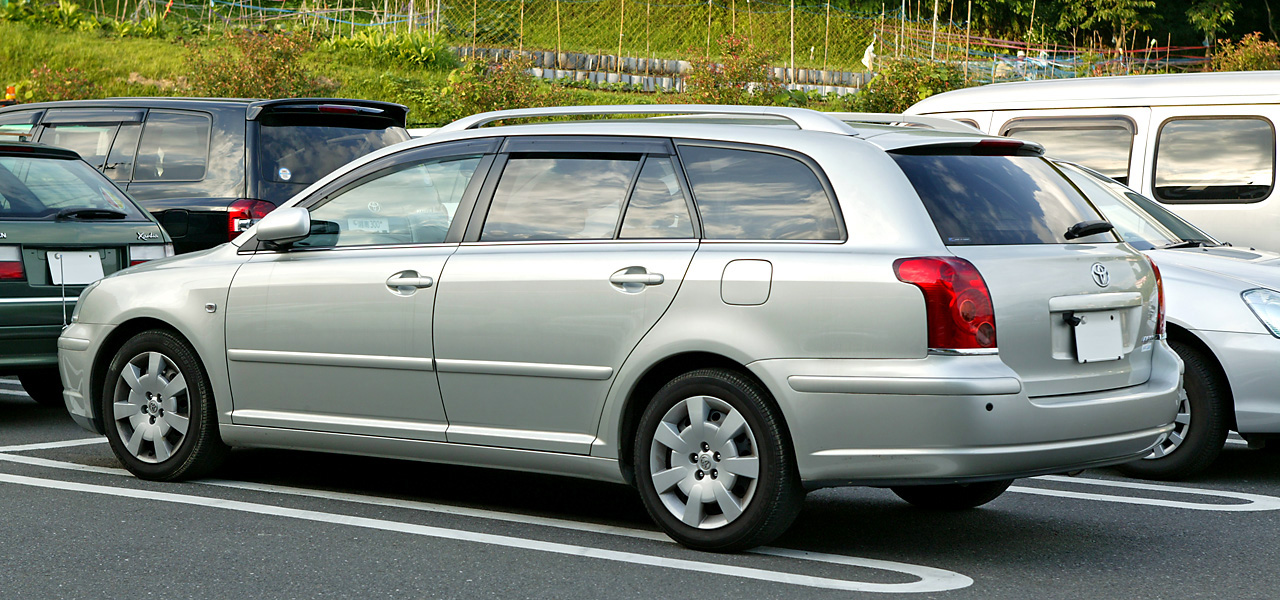
Estate (pre-facelift)

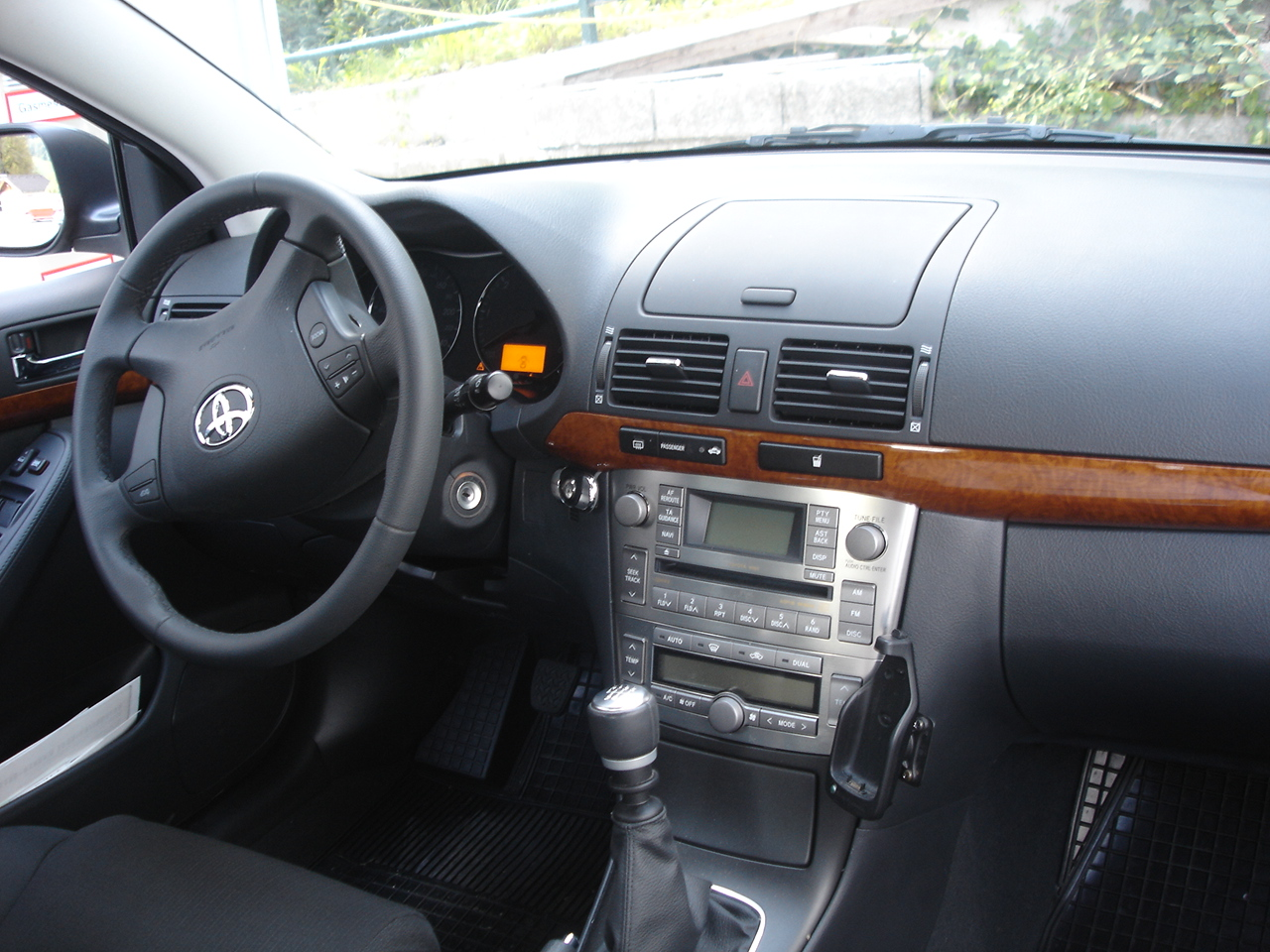
Interior

=== Facelift ===
In 2006, the Avensis received a mid-career facelift. Exterior cosmetic changes include a slightly redesigned logo, a new front grille with double concave lines (including a new darker grille treatment on higher trim levels), new headlamps and rear combination lamps, revised front bumpers and front fog lights, door mirror with turn signals adoption, new tyres, a new wheel design (in two colours) and a new wheel cap design, and five changed body colours. Toyota describes the cosmetic changes as strengthening the family connection with the Corolla and Yaris, and allowing the Avensis to maintain a premium look while giving it a sportier appearance.

Inside, the dashboard materials are revised, the beige interior is replaced by a new grege interior, the instrumentation is revised, the design of the switches is changed, the passenger seat is now height adjustable, alcantara seats are available, and the seats become 60:40 split folding. The Hi-Fi, which previously had a CD and tape player, now only accepts CDs but also plays MP3s. The central screen containing the information of the on-board computer has been removed in favour of a compartment (as on the previous entry-level) and is now integrated into the meters facing the driver.

From a structural point of view, the underbody is reinforced. Finally, the 2.0L D4D 85 kW (115 hp) diesel engine is replaced by the 2.0L D4D 93 kW (126 hp) engine. This, coupled to a six-speed manual gearbox, has lowered fuel consumption, emissions, and gives a quoted 0–97 km/h (0–60 mph) time of 10.5 seconds.

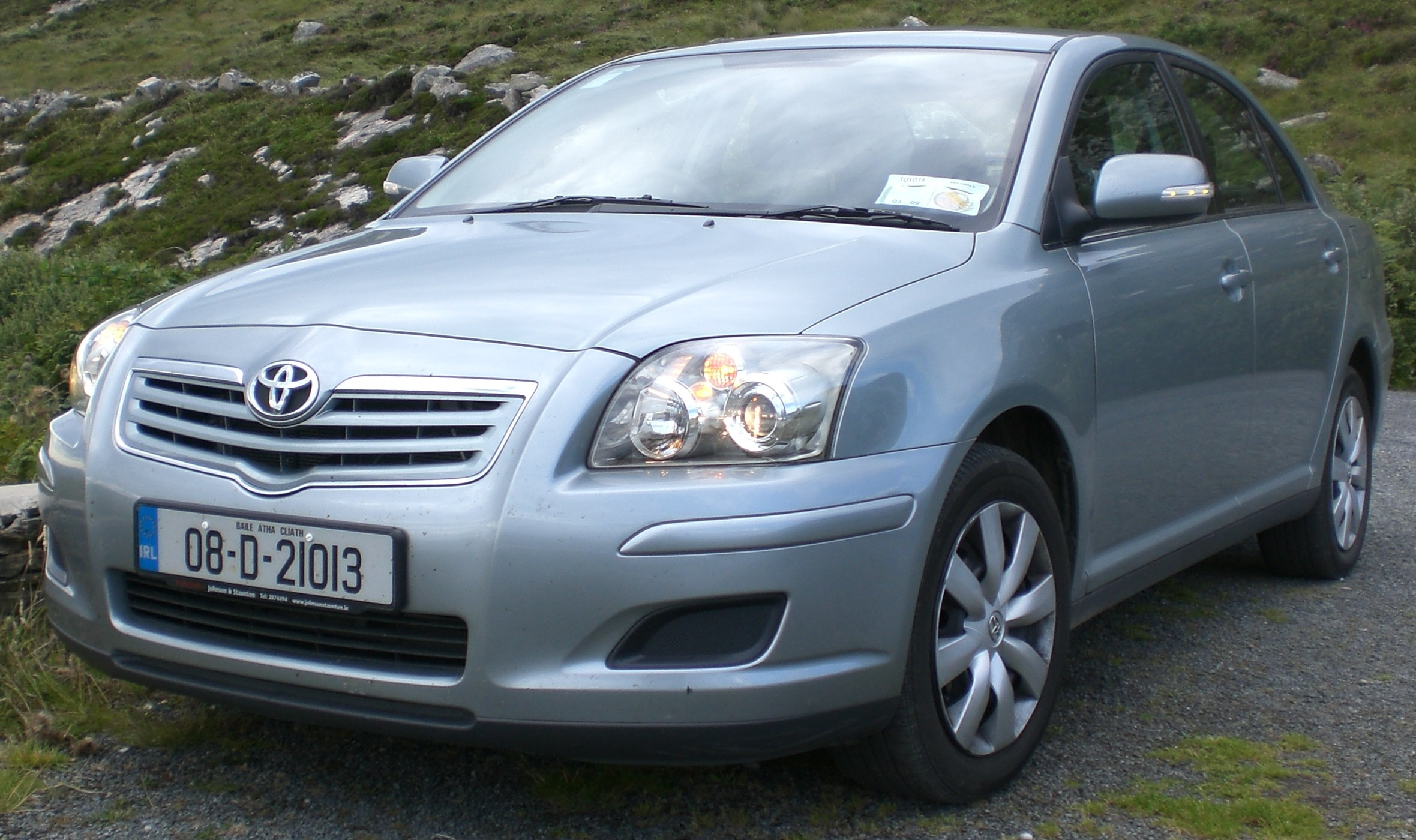
Saloon (facelift)

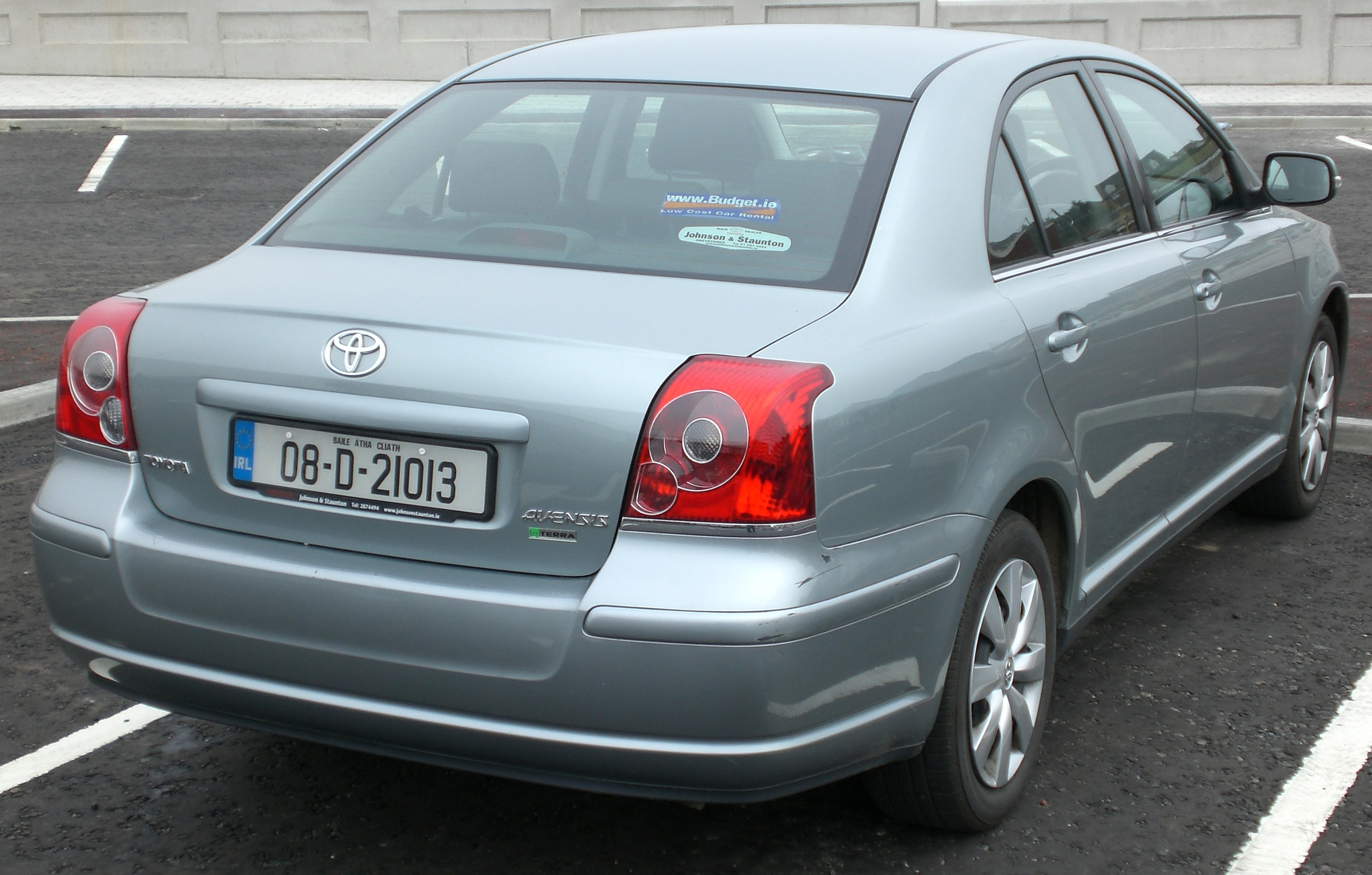
Saloon (facelift)

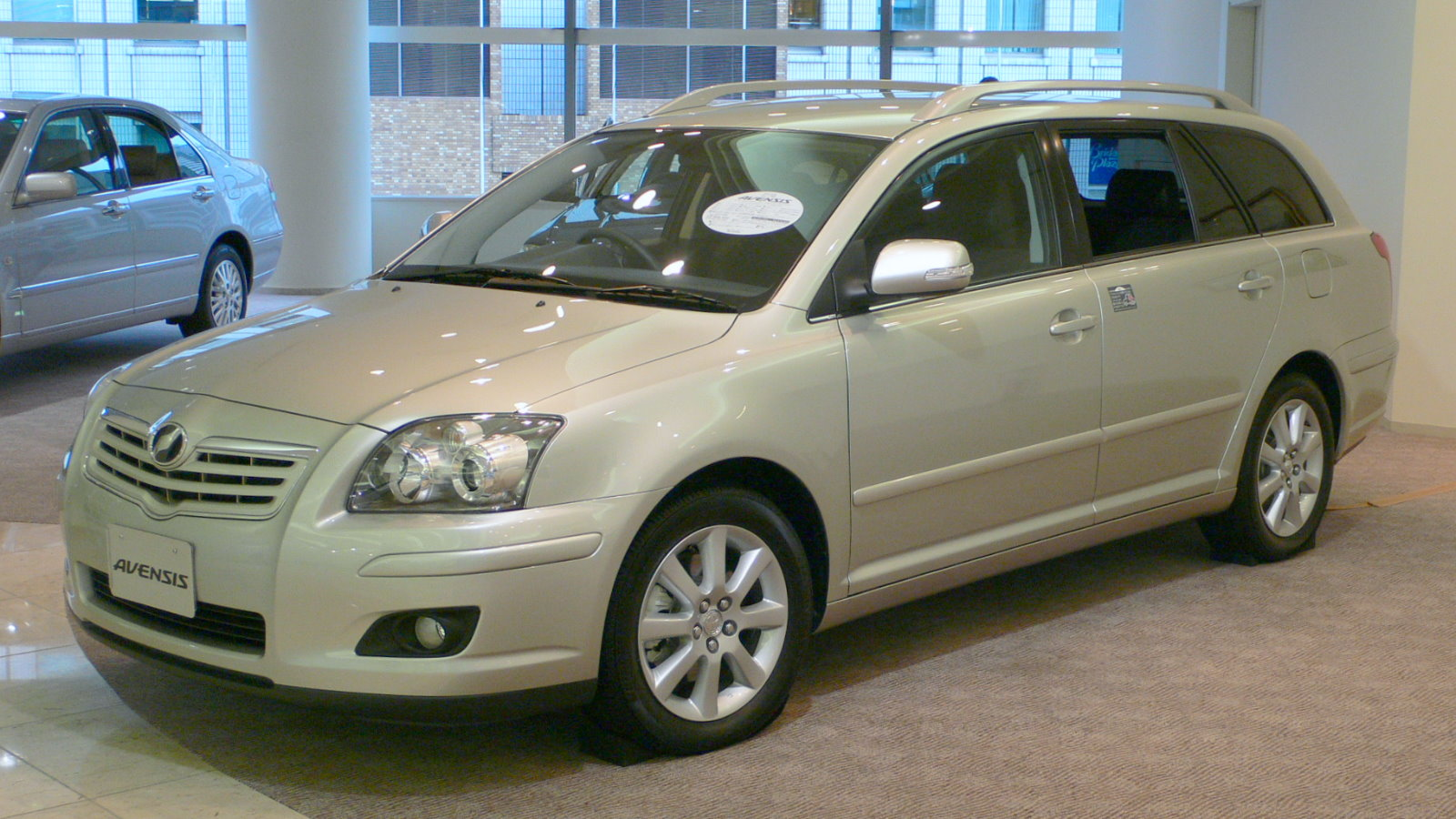
Estate (Japan; facelift)

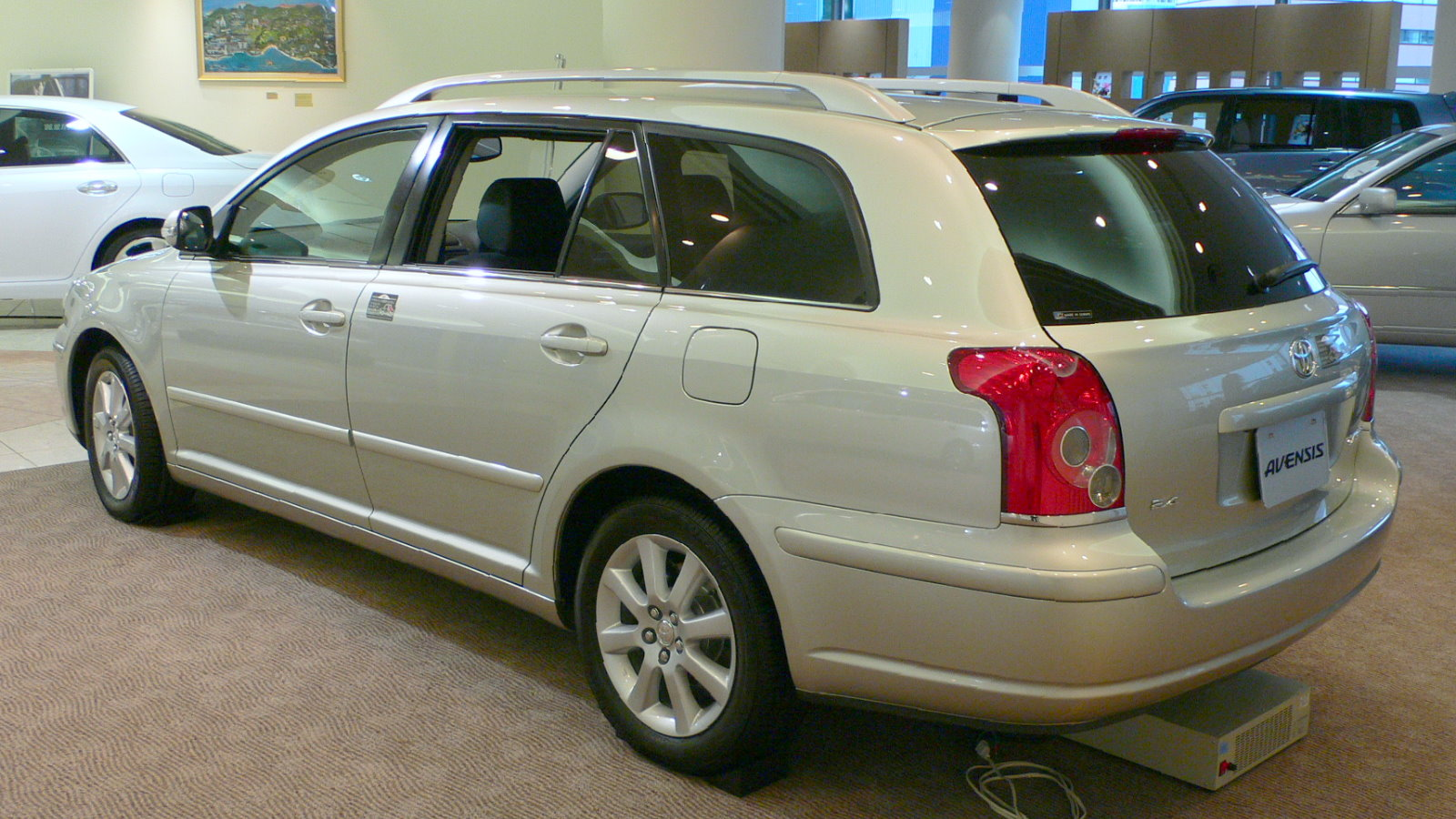
Estate (Japan; facelift)

=== Safety ===
In 2003, the Avensis became the first Japanese vehicle to receive a five-star rating under the Euro NCAP's redone testing, with 34 total points it also became the highest rated vehicle they had tested. In 2003, the Avensis also became the first vehicle sold in Europe with a knee airbag.

=== Engines ===
The 1.6-, 1.8- and 2.0-litre petrol and 2.0-litre turbo-diesel engines were carried over from the previous Avensis, and the 2.4-litre four-cylinder from the Camry was also added to the range. This was the first Avensis to be exported to Japan. Due to the Camry Wagon ending production, the Avensis Wagon is exported to New Zealand, in both 1.8- and 2.0-litre forms. In the United Kingdom, there were no 1.6-litre versions available.

The original 115 PS (85 kW) D-4D diesel engine has been complemented with a 2.2 L D-4D in 136 PS (2AD-FTV) and 177 PS (2AD-FHV) versions. Newer versions have dropped the "D-4D" and "2.0" badging from the front wings and tailgate respectively.

From 2005, the 2.4 L version was fitted with a 5-speed automatic transmission.

==== Petrol ====
- 1.6-litre VVT-i 3ZZ-FE 81 kW (110 hp)
- 1.8-litre VVT-i 1ZZ-FE 95 kW (129 hp)
- 2.0-litre VVT-i 1AZ-FSE 108 kW (147 hp)
- 2.4-litre VVT-i 2AZ-FSE 120 kW (163 hp)

==== Diesel ====
- 2.0-litre D-4D 1CD-FTV 85 kW (115 hp) (Pre-Facelift Only)
- 2.0-litre D-4D 1AD-FTV 93 kW (126 hp) (Post-Facelift Only)
- 2.2-litre D-4D 2AD-FTV 110 kW (150 hp)
- 2.2-litre D-Cat 2AD-FHV 130 kW (177 hp)

== Third generation (T270; 2009) ==
Third generation
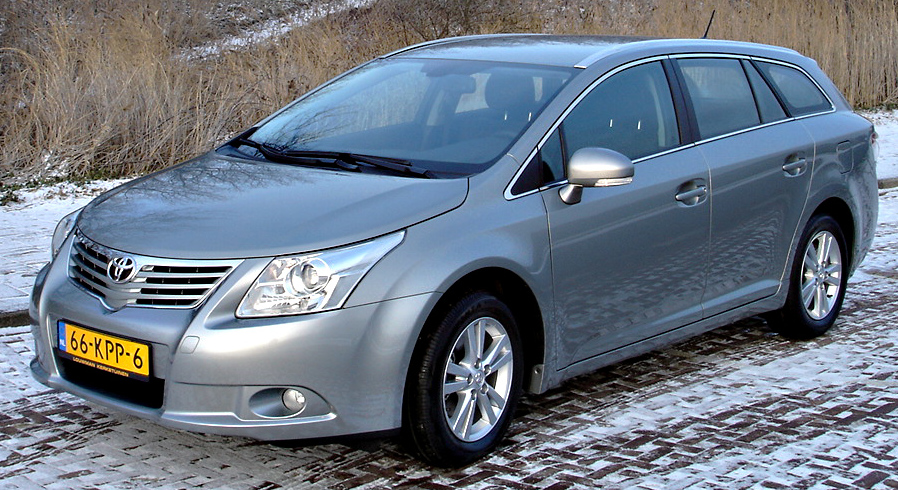
- Pre-facelift Toyota Avensis wagon (Netherlands)

Overview
- Model code: T270
- Production: January 2009 – August 2018

Body and chassis
- Body style: 4-door saloon; 5-door estate
- Platform: Toyota New MC platform
- Related: Toyota Premio (T260); Toyota Allion (T260); Toyota Sai; Toyota Verso (AR20); Lexus HS; Scion tC (AT20)

Powertrain
- Engine: Petrol: 1.6 L 1ZR-FAE Valvematic I4; 1.8 L 2ZR-FAE Valvematic I4; 2.0 L 3ZR-FAE Valvematic I4; Diesel: 1.6 L 1WW D-4D I4-T; 2.0 L 2WW D-4D I4-T; 2.0 L D-4D 1AD-FTV I4-T; 2.2 L D-4D 2AD-FTV I4-T; 2.2 L D-CAT 2AD-FHV I4-T
- Transmission: 6-speed manual; MultiDrive S CVT; 6-speed U660E automatic (diesel)

Dimensions
- Wheelbase: 2,700 mm (106.3 in)
- Length: Saloon: 4,695 mm (184.8 in); Estate: 4,780 mm (188.2 in)
- Width: 1,810 mm (71.3 in)
- Height: 1,480 mm (58.3 in)

Chronology
- Predecessor: Toyota Caldina (T240) (Japan, for wagon/estate models)
- Successor: Toyota Camry (XV70)

The third generation Avensis was revealed at the 2008 Paris Motor Show. It went on sale in January 2009. Like the previous model, it is built at Toyota's Burnaston plant in Derbyshire, England. This generation is available in saloon or estate styles only. The third generation Avensis full-year sales goal was of 115,000 vehicles.

Toyota ED^{2} initially designed the Avensis giving it a more sleek and athletic stance. It has a drag coefficient of Cd=0.28 for the saloon and Cd=0.29 for the wagon body. Other design goals were to create the most comfortable suspension in its class while still offering sporty handling. The Avensis continued to use front MacPherson struts and rear double wishbones. Unlike the previous generation Avensis models, there is no five door hatchback body style in this lineup, in favour of saloon and estate body styles.

Major options include bi-xenon HID headlamps, Adaptive Front-lighting System (AFS), and adaptive cruise control.

The Avensis wagon began being imported again to Japan in mid-2011, with 2.0-litre 4-cylinder engine and CVT transmission in Li and Xi variants. The Avensis wagon was discontinued in Japan on 27 April 2018.

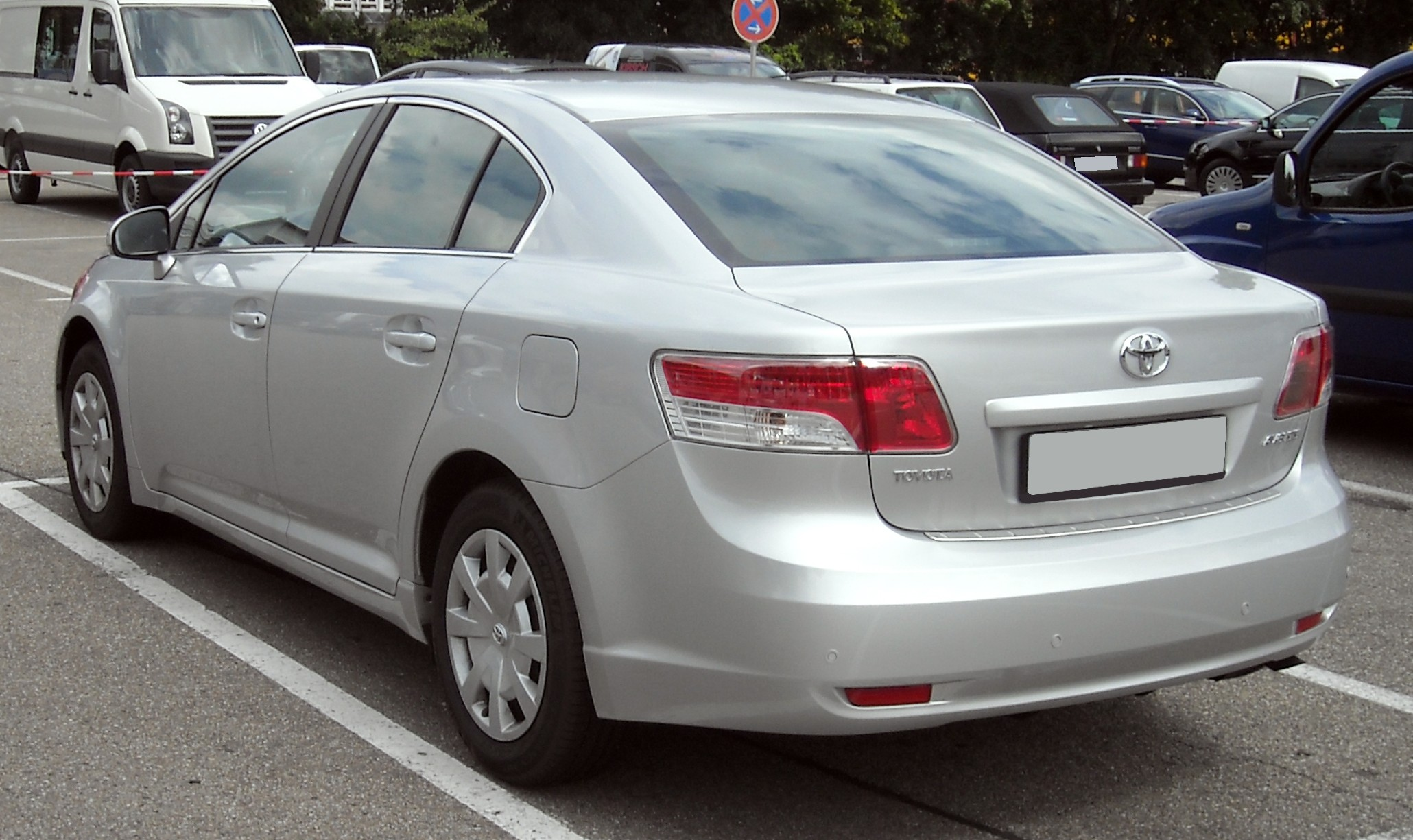
Saloon (pre-facelift)

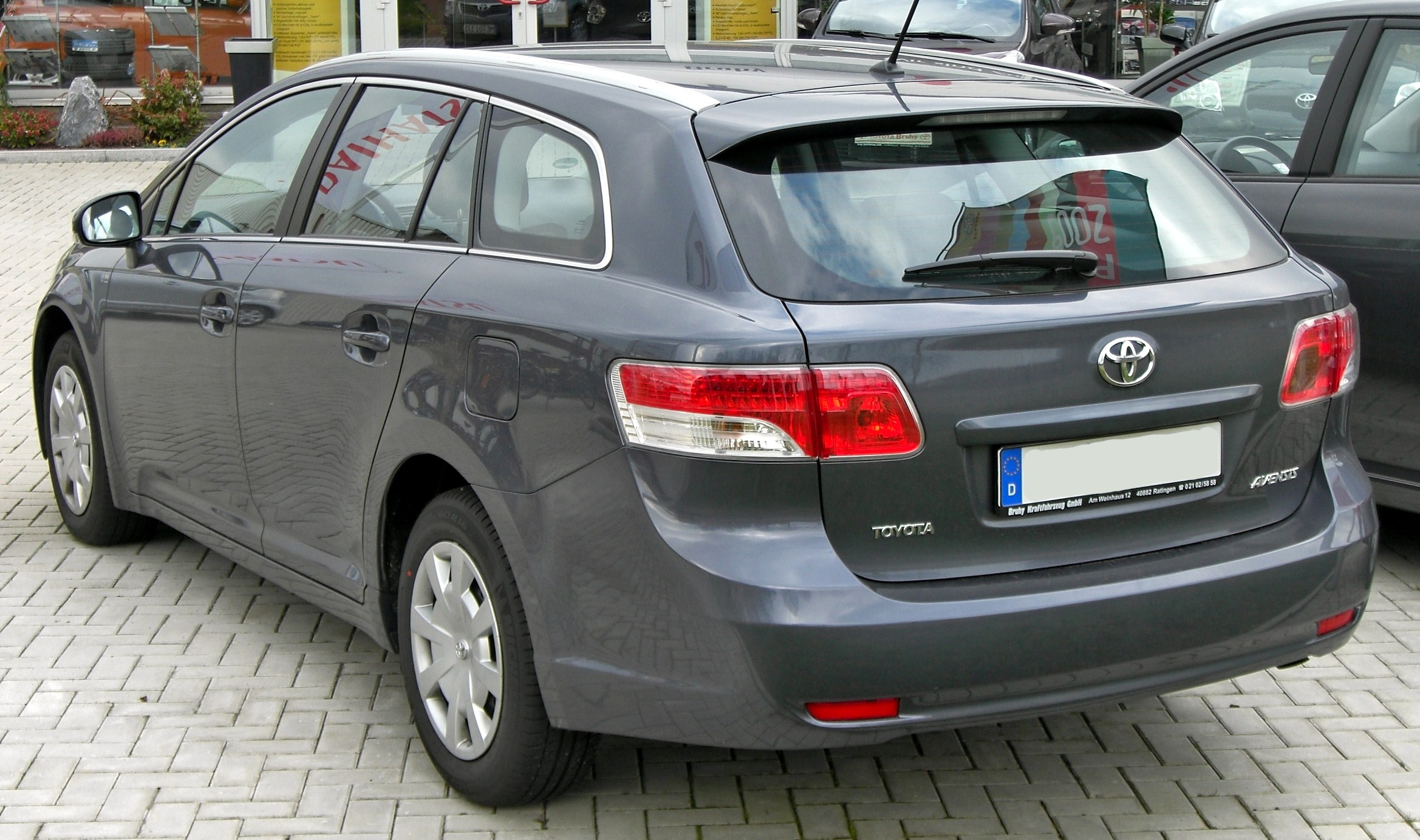
Estate (pre-facelift)

=== First facelift (2012–2015) ===
The Avensis underwent a facelift in January 2012. This included a revised front grille and modified tail lamps. The changes were first shown in September 2011 at the Frankfurt Motor Show before sales started in January 2012.

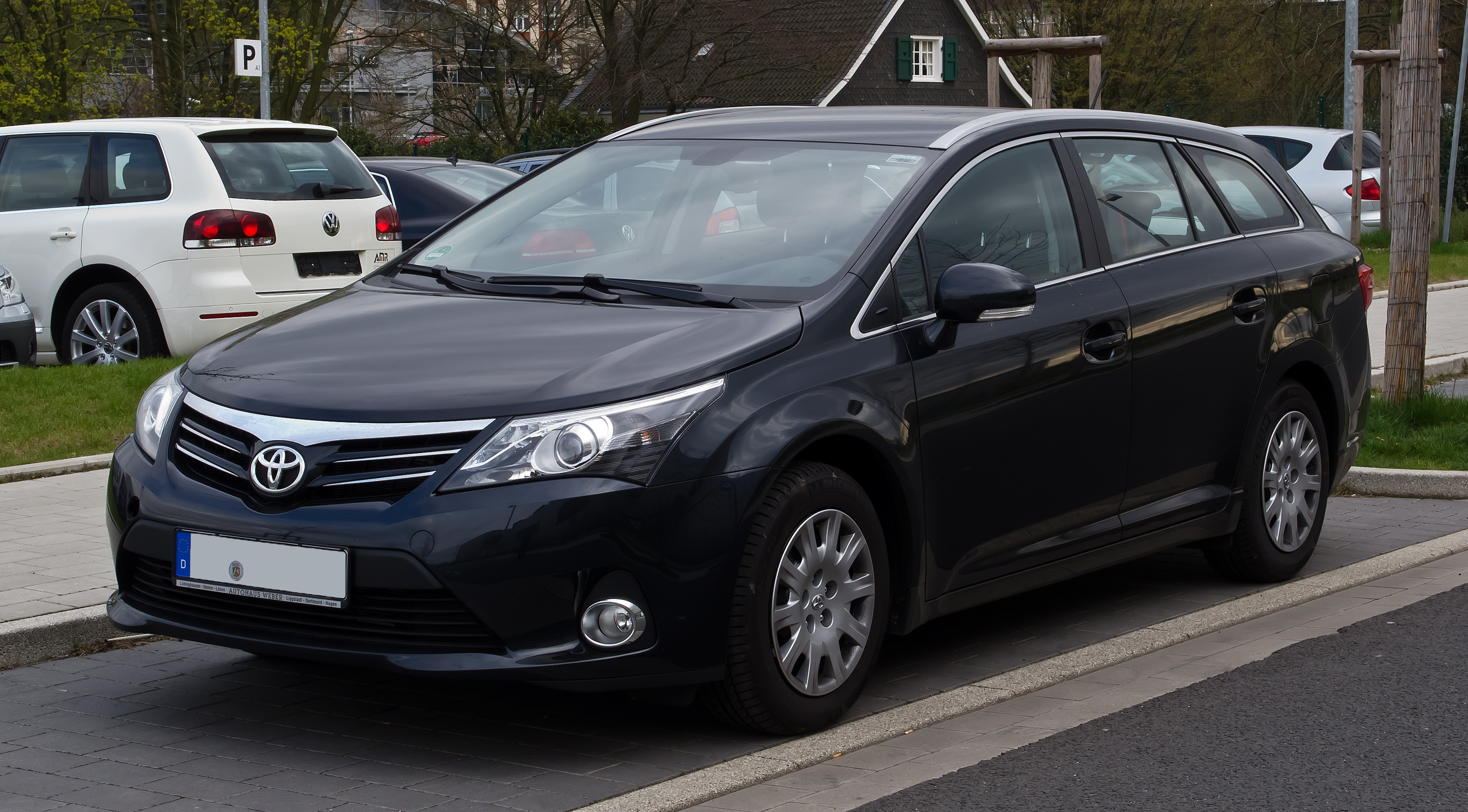
Estate (first facelift)

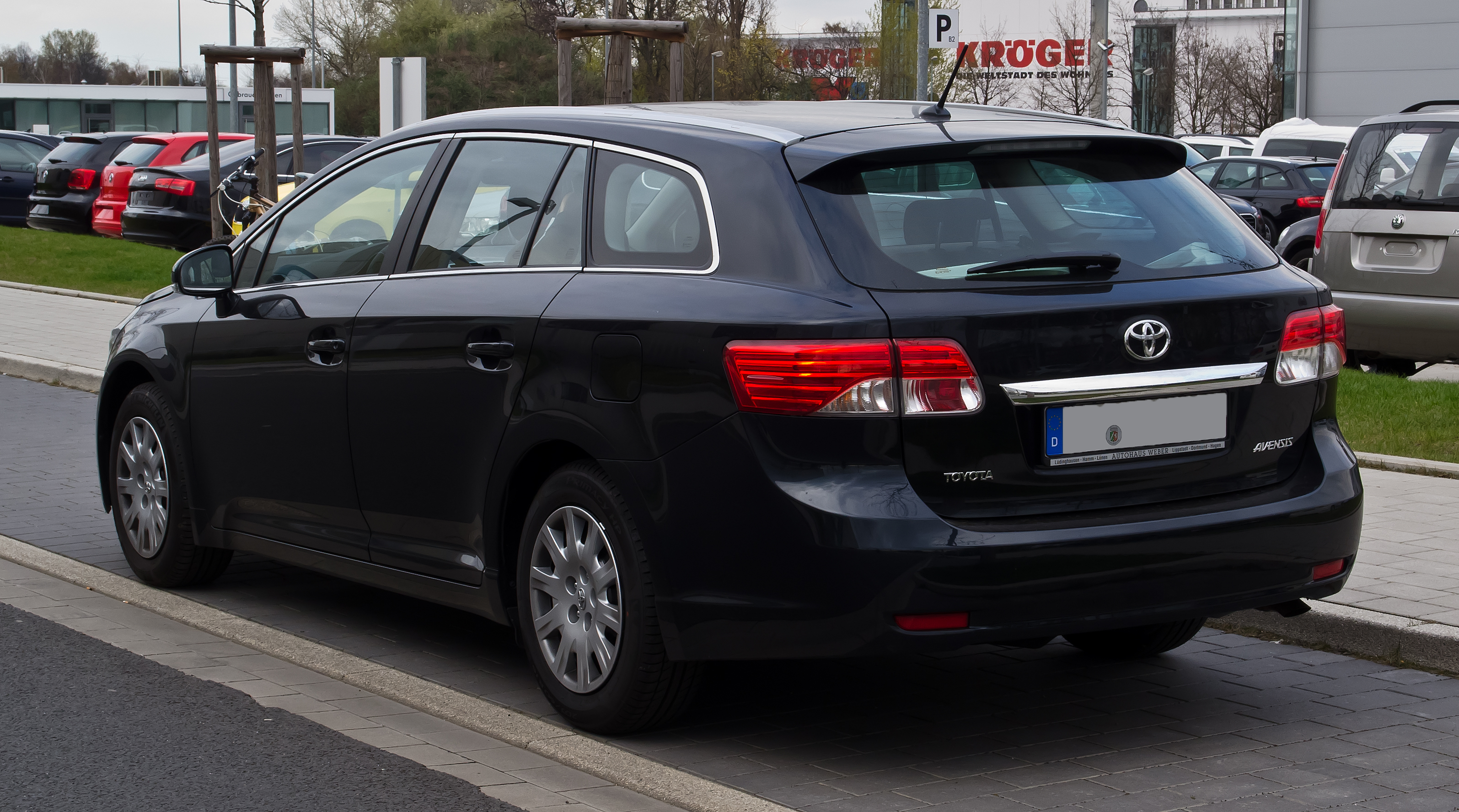
Estate (first facelift)

=== Second facelift (2015–2018) ===
A further facelift was shown in March 2015 at the Geneva Motor Show. The facelifted vehicle was officially launched in June 2015. This included a revised front grille, rear view, headlamps and taillamps and a new interior. In addition to the new "Toyota Safety Sense", new engines were also shown. The 1.6-litre diesel replaces the previous 2.0-litre engine.

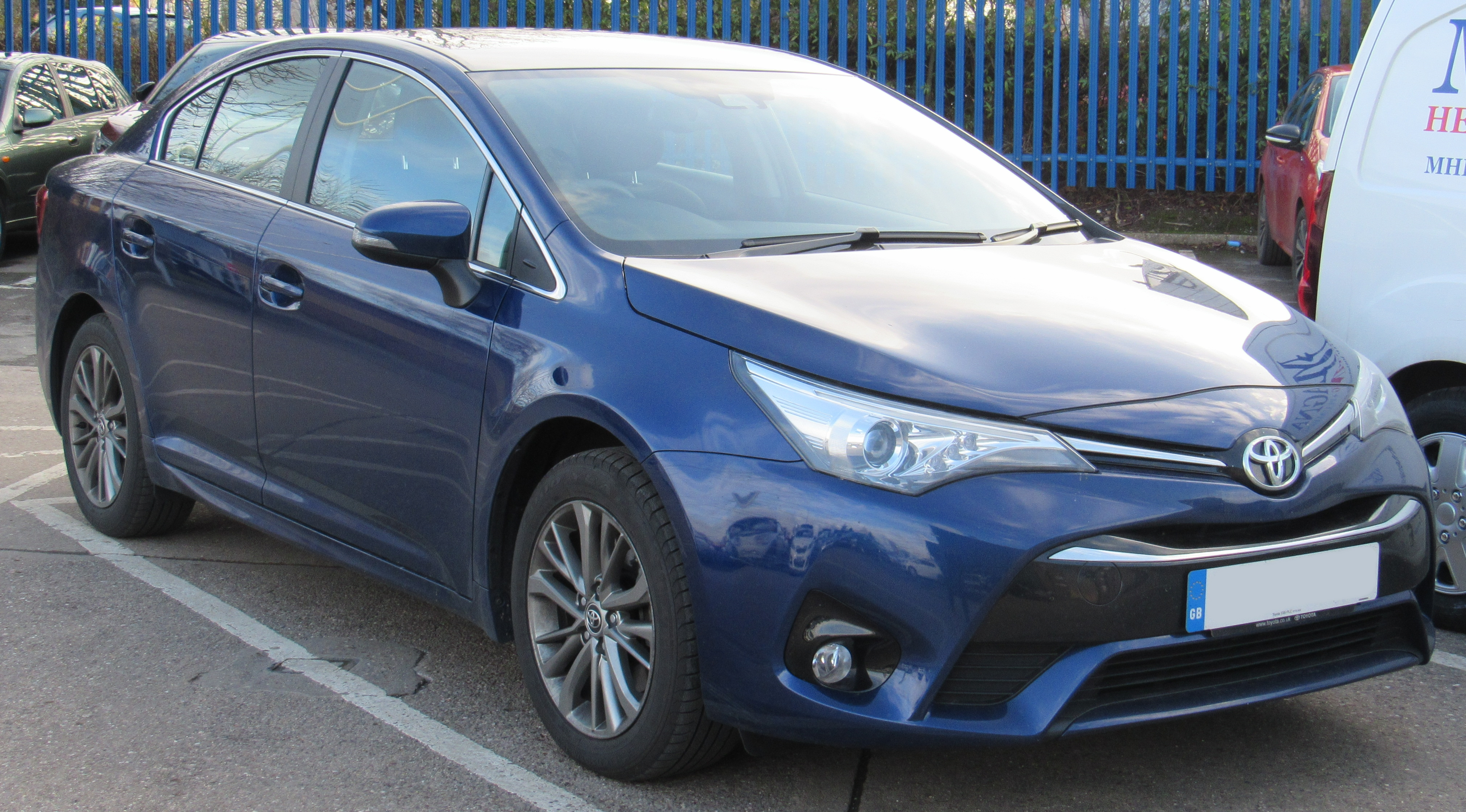
Saloon (second facelift)

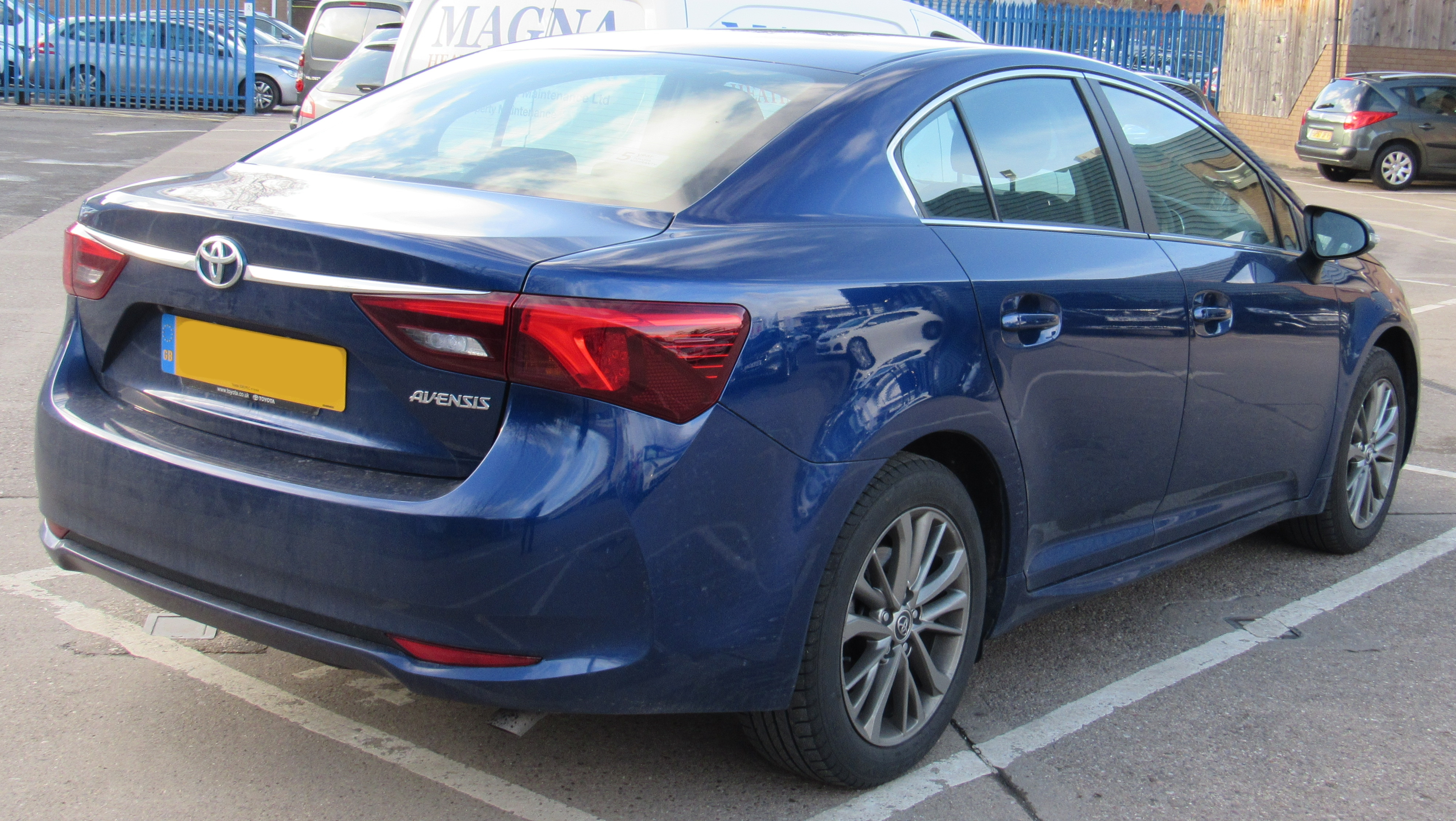
Saloon (second facelift)

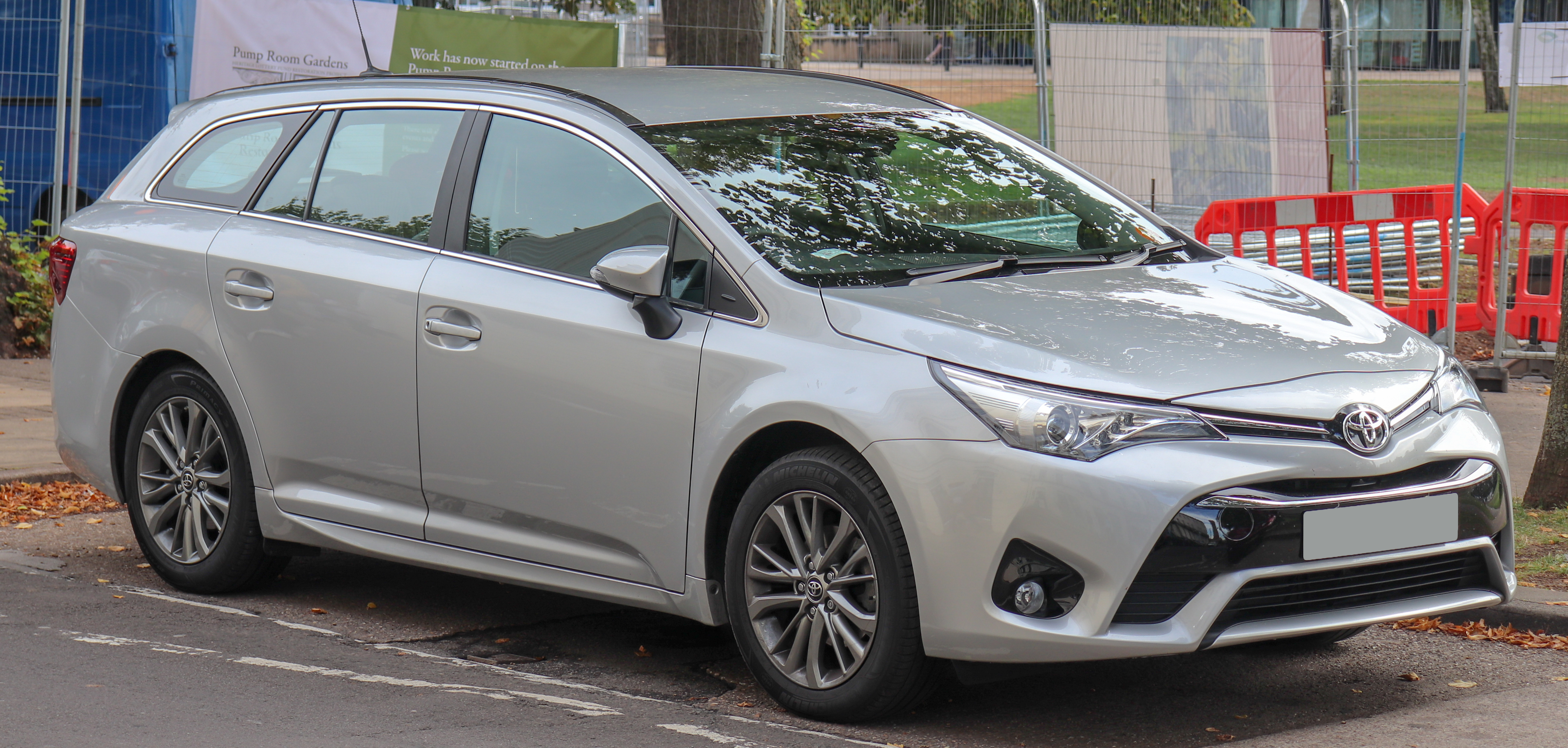
Estate (second facelift)

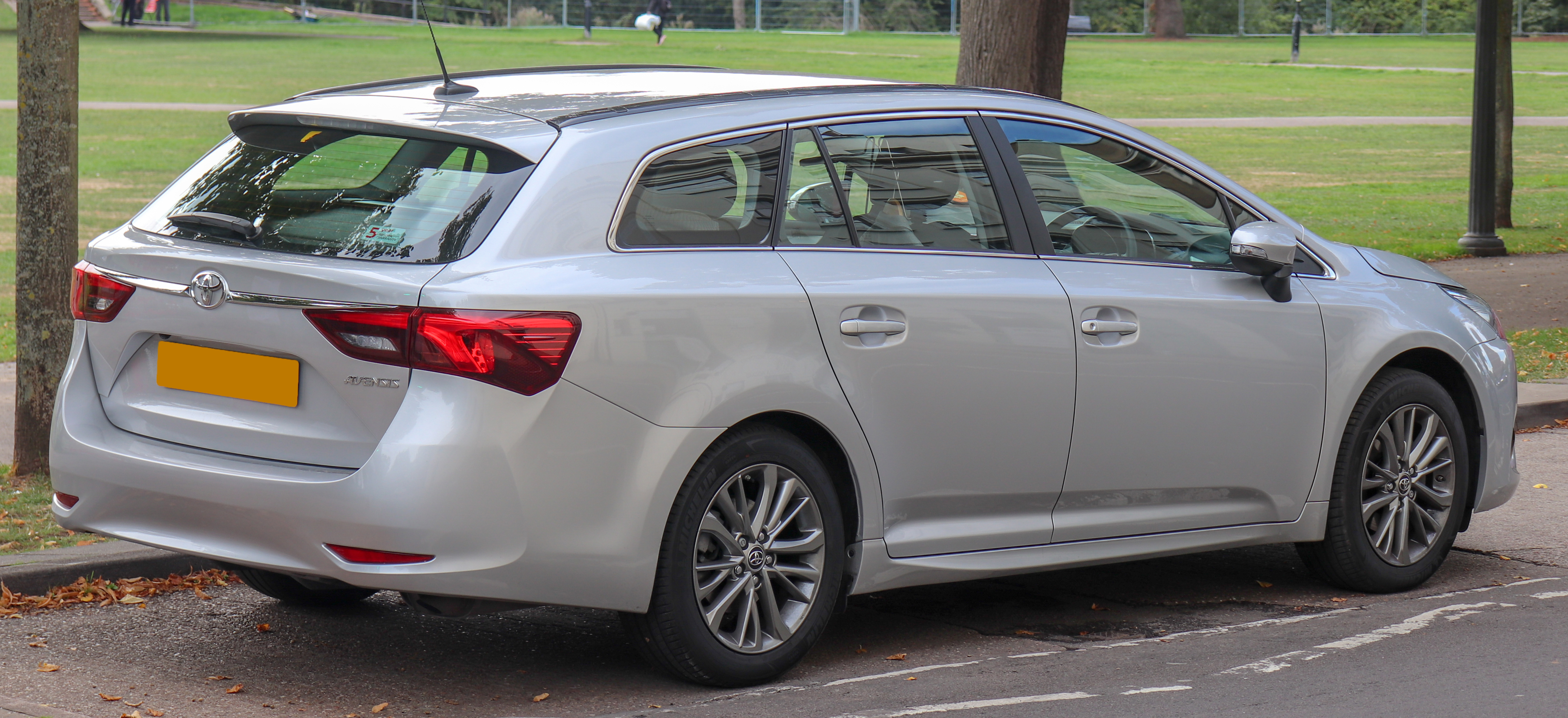
Estate (second facelift)

=== Safety ===
For safety, seven airbags are standard, including two front row side torso airbags, two side curtain airbags for both rows, and a driver's knee airbag. For rear collisions, active front headrests designed to help reduce whiplash are standard as well as brake lamps that flash under emergency braking. Vehicle Stability Control+ (VSC+) applies torque to the steering wheel to aid the driver in steering. A Pre-Collision System (PCS) becomes optional which includes Lane Departure Warning (LDW) and Lane Keeping Assist (LKA).

The Avensis received a five-star rating under the latest Euro NCAP ratings scheme with an 81% overall score and a 90% score for adult occupant safety.

ANCAP test results Toyota Avensis all New Zealand variants (2015, aligned with Euro NCAP)
Test	Points	%
Overall:	5 /5 stars	
Adult occupant:	35.3	93%
Child occupant:	42	85%
Pedestrian:	28.2	78%
Safety assist:	10.6	81%

=== Engines ===
The Avensis offers three petrol and four diesel engine options. Petrol engines are sourced from Toyota's Deeside Engine Plant. The new engines feature more power and lower CO_{2} emissions. The new ZR engines became the first to introduce Toyota's Valvematic technology.

==== Petrol ====
- 1.6-litre 1ZR-FAE 97 kW (130 hp) 2008–2018
- 1.8-litre 2ZR-FAE 108 kW (145 hp) 2008–2018
- 2.0-litre 3ZR-FAE 112 kW (150 hp) 2008–2018, 2008–2011 (Germany)

==== Diesel ====
- 1.6-litre D-4D 1WW 82 kW (110 hp) 2015–2017
- 2.0-litre D-4D 1AD-FTV 91 kW (122 hp) 2011–2015
- 2.0-litre D-4D 1AD-FTV 93 kW (125 hp) 2008–2011
- 2.0-litre D-4D 2WW 105 kW (141 hp) 2015–2018
- 2.2-litre D-4D 2AD-FTV 110 kW (148 hp) 2008–2015
- 2.2-litre D-4D 2AD-FHV 130 kW (174 hp) 2008–2015

All engines are mated to a six-speed manual transmission while the 1.8 L and 2.0 L petrol engines are available with a Multidrive S CVT transmission. The 2.2-litre D-4D 150 hp engine is available with a six-speed automatic transmission.

=== Motorsports ===
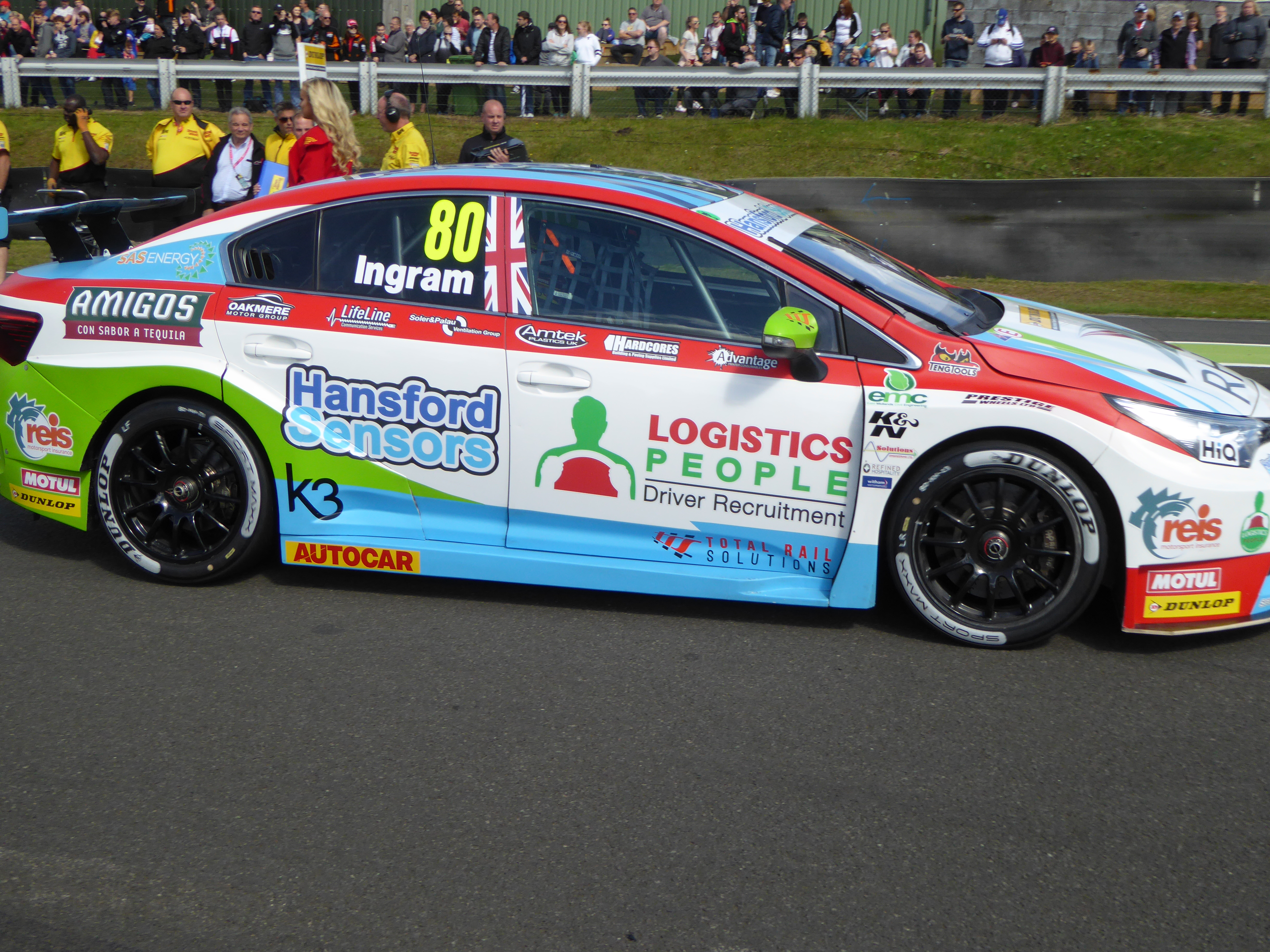
Tom Ingram, at the Knockhill round of the 2017 British Touring Car Championship.

On 2 August 2010, it was announced the British Touring Car Championship's NGTC prototype car would be built around the Toyota Avensis.

Series organiser TOCA, which would fully introduce the new low-cost NGTC technical regulations in 2011, said that the Japanese manufacturer would supply a donor car and a new body shell to the programme. The Avensis was used by Speedworks Motorsport, driven by Tom Ingram, until the end of the 2018 season.

== Discontinuation ==
The Avensis was discontinued in the United Kingdom in August 2018 and across Europe in late 2018. It was partially replaced by the slightly larger XV70 series Camry, which is based on the TNGA-K platform.

== Nameplate usage for other models ==
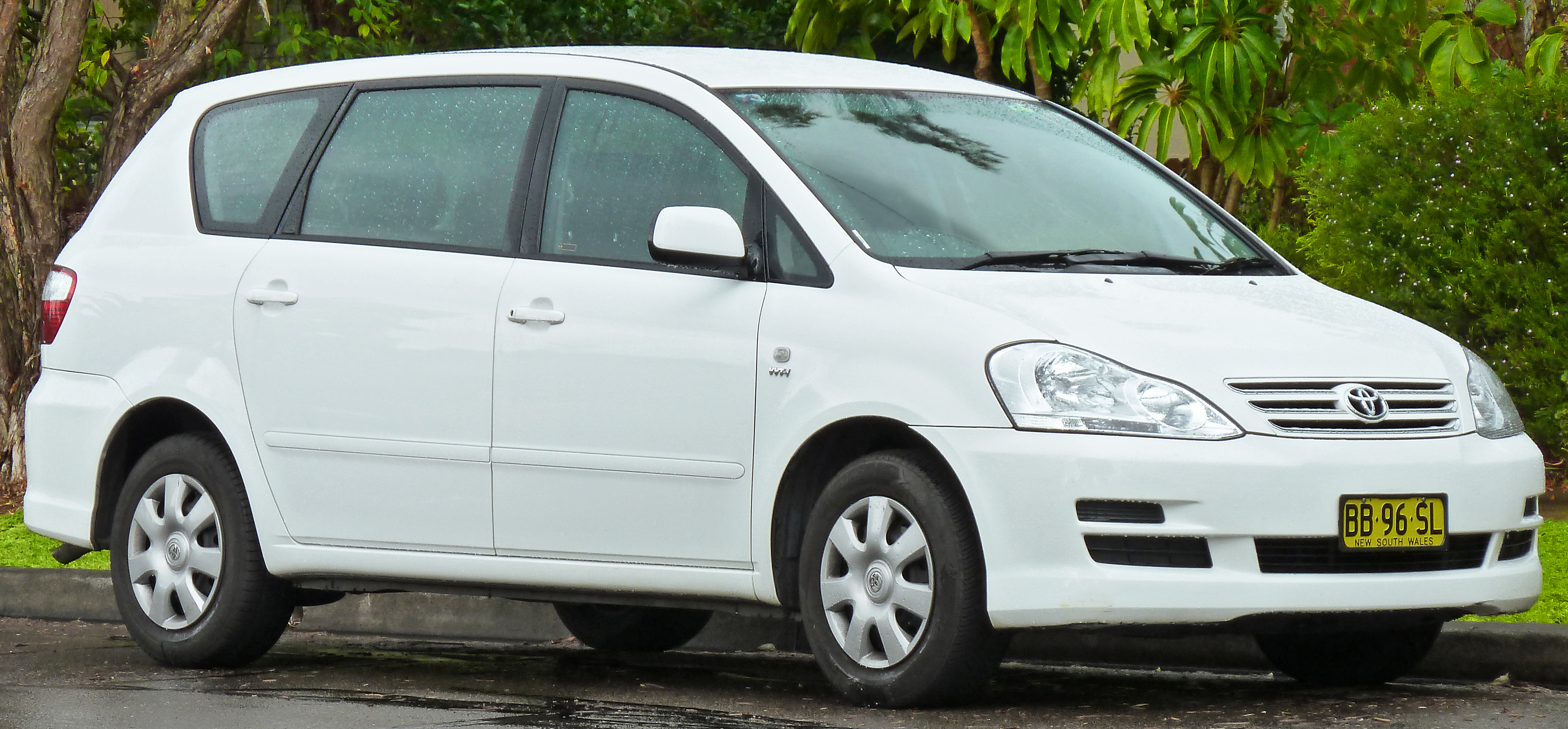
Avensis Verso

=== Avensis Verso ===
The Avensis Verso was a large MPV introduced in 2001 using the Avensis nameplate, with room for seven occupants and only initially available with 2.0-litre engines. The Avensis Verso's platform preceded the second generation model. The Avensis Verso was the back-to-back winner of Australia's Best People Mover award in 2002 and 2003. The Avensis Verso continued to be available alongside the second-generation Avensis until 2006.

== See also ==
- List of Toyota vehicles
