= Toyota WW engine =

Overview
- Manufacturer: Toyota & BMW
- Production: 2011–2018

Layout
- Configuration: Straight-4
- Cylinder block material: Aluminium
- Cylinder head material: Aluminium
- Valvetrain: DOHC, 4 valves per cylinder

Combustion
- Fuel system: Common rail
- Fuel type: Turbo diesel

Chronology
- Predecessor: Toyota AD engine

The Toyota WW engine family is a series of 16-valve DOHC inline-4 common rail direct injection turbo diesel engines produced by Toyota from 2011 through 2018. These engines are based on the BMW N47, modified for use in Toyota vehicles, starting with the Verso in 2014. This involved the development of a number of new components, including engine mounts, a dual-mass flywheel, a new gearbox housing and gearing and a stop/start system to further improve efficiency and reduce emissions. The WW engine is offered in 1.6-liter (112 PS, 270 Nm) and 2.0-liter (143 PS, 320 Nm) versions.

== 1WW-FTV ==
1WW-FTV

Overview
- Manufacturer: Toyota & BMW

Layout
- Displacement: 1.6 L (1,598 cc)
- Cylinder bore: 78.0 mm (3.07 in)
- Piston stroke: 83.6 mm (3.29 in)
- Compression ratio: 16.5:1

Combustion
- Fuel type: Diesel

Output
- Power output: 82 kW (111 PS)
- Torque output: 270 N⋅m (199 lb⋅ft)

The 1WW-FTV is a 1.6 L (1,598 cc) turbo-diesel engine that produces 112 PS (110 hp) and 270 N⋅m (199 lb⋅ft) of torque. This engine is derived from the 1.6 L version of the BMW N47.

Applications:

- Toyota Verso 1.6 D-4D
- Toyota Auris 1.6 D-4D
- Toyota Avensis 1.6 D-4D

== 2WW-FTV ==
2WW-FTV

Overview
- Manufacturer: Toyota & BMW

Layout
- Displacement: 2.0 L (1,995 cc)
- Cylinder bore: 84.0 mm (3.31 in)
- Piston stroke: 90.0 mm (3.54 in)
- Compression ratio: 16.5:1

Combustion
- Fuel type: Diesel

Output
- Power output: 107 kW (143 hp)
- Torque output: 320 N⋅m (236 lb⋅ft)

The 2WW-FTV is a 2.0 L (1,995 cc) turbo-diesel engine that produces 143 PS (141 hp; 105 kW) of peak power and 320 N⋅m (240 lb⋅ft) of peak torque. It is based on the 2.0 L version of the BMW N47.

Applications:

- Toyota Avensis 2.0 D-4D
- Toyota RAV4 2.0 D-4D

== See also ==
- List of Toyota engines
